= List of radio stations in Louisiana =

The following is a list of Federal Communications Commission–licensed radio stations in the American state of Louisiana, which can be sorted by their call signs, frequencies, cities of license, licensees, and programming formats.

== List of radio stations ==
Call sign	Frequency	City of license	Licensee	Format
KAGY	1510 AM	Port Sulphur	Spotlight Broadcasting of New Orleans, LLC	Swamp pop
KAJD-LP	96.5 FM	Baton Rouge	City of Joy, Inc.	Urban Gospel
KAJN-FM	102.9 FM	Crowley	Agape Broadcasters, Inc.	Contemporary Christian
KANE	1240 AM	New Iberia	Coastal Broadcasting of Lafourche, L.L.C.	Oldies
KAOK	1400 AM	Lake Charles	Cumulus Licensing LLC	News/Talk
KAPB-FM	97.7 FM	Marksville	Bontemps Media Services LLC	Classic country
KAPI	88.3 FM	Ruston	American Family Association	Inspirational (AFR)
KAPM	91.7 FM	Alexandria	American Family Association	Inspirational (AFR)
KASO	1240 AM	Minden	Minden Broadcasting, LLC	Classic hits
KAVK	89.3 FM	Many	American Family Association	Inspirational (AFR)
KAXV	91.9 FM	Bastrop	American Family Association	Inspirational (AFR)
KAYT	88.1 FM	Jena	Black Media Works, Inc.	Urban contemporary
KBAN	91.5 FM	DeRidder	American Family Association	Religious Talk (AFR)
KBCE	102.3 FM	Boyce	JWBP Broadcasting, LLC	Urban contemporary
KBCL	1070 AM	Bossier City	Barnabas Center Ministries	Christian talk
KBDV	92.7 FM	Leesville	Baldridge-Dumas Communications, Inc.	Adult contemporary
KBEF	104.5 FM	Gibsland	Minden Broadcasting, LLC	Classic country
KBFA-LP	95.7 FM	West Monroe	West Monroe Adventist Educational Broadcasting Corporation	Religious (Radio 74 Internationale)
KBIO	89.7 FM	Natchitoches	Radio Maria, Inc.	Christian radio
KBIU	103.3 FM	Lake Charles	Cumulus Licensing LLC	CHR
KBKK	105.5 FM	Ball	SMG-Alexandria, LLC	Classic country
KBLK-LP	106.3 FM	Shreveport	Blacks United For Lasting Leadership, Inc.	Urban Gospel
KBMQ	88.7 FM	Monroe	Media Ministries, Inc.	Christian adult contemporary
KBNF-LP	101.3 FM	Ruston	Lincoln Parish Schools aka Ruston High School	’80s classic hits
KBON	101.1 FM	Mamou	Rose Ann Marx	Americana
KBRH	1260 AM	Baton Rouge	East Baton Rouge Parish Public Schools Board	Urban oldies
KBRS	106.9 FM	Belle Rose	Alex Media, Inc.	Gospel
KBTT	103.7 FM	Haughton	Alpha Media Licensee LLC	Mainstream urban
KBYO-FM	92.7 FM	Farmerville	Media Ministries, Inc.	Contemporary worship
KBYS	88.3 FM	Lake Charles	McNeese State University	Variety
KBZE	105.9 FM	Berwick	Hubcast Broadcasting, Inc.	Urban adult contemporary
KCIL	96.7 FM	Gray	JLE, Incorporated	Country
KCKR	91.9 FM	Church Point	Family Worship Center Church, Inc.	Religious
KCLF	1500 AM	New Roads	New World Broadcasting Company, Inc.	Urban contemporary
KCXB-LP	102.5 FM	West Monroe	Bawcomville Church of Christ	Religious Teaching
KDAQ	89.9 FM	Shreveport	Bd Supervisors,	Public radio
KDBH-FM	97.5 FM	Natchitoches	Baldridge-Dumas Communications, Inc.	Country
KDBS	1410 AM	Alexandria	Cenla Broadcasting Licensing Company, LLC	Sports (ESPN)
KDDK	105.5 FM	Addis	Radio & Investments, Inc.	Spanish tropical
KDKS-FM	102.1 FM	Blanchard	Alpha Media Licensee LLC	Urban adult contemporary
KDLA	98.3 FM	New Llano	James M Lout	
KDLC	97.7 FM	Dulac	Coast Radio Group, Inc.	Classic rock
KEBL-LP	105.5 FM	Sulphur	Parkview Baptist Church	Religious Teaching
KECS-LP	94.9 FM	Lafayette	Proyecto Hispano de Ayuda a la Comunidad	Spanish Religious
KEDG	106.9 FM	Alexandria	Flinn Broadcasting Corporation	Adult contemporary
KEDM	90.3 FM	Monroe	University of Louisiana at Monroe	Public radio, NPR
KEEL	710 AM	Shreveport	Townsquare License, LLC	News/Talk
KELB-LP	100.5 FM	Lake Charles	Five Point Radio, Inc.	Southern gospel
KEPP-LP	95.1 FM	Epps	Gourd Farming Educational Society, Inc.	Variety
KEUN	1490 AM	Eunice	Cajun Prairie Broadcasting, LLC	News/Talk
KEUN-FM	105.5 FM	Eunice	Cajun Prairie Broadcasting, LLC	Country and Cajun music, Swamp Pop and Cajun music
KEWZ-LP	95.3 FM	West Monroe	West Monroe Community Radio	Easy listening
KEZP	104.3 FM	Bunkie	SMG-Alexandria, LLC	News/Talk
KFLO-FM	90.9 FM	Minden	Family Life Educational Foundation	Contemporary Christian
KFNV-FM	107.1 FM	Ferriday	Miss Lou Media, LLC	Classic hits
KFRA	1390 AM	Franklin	Castay Media, Inc.	Urban adult contemporary
KFTE	105.1 FM	Abbeville	The Fort Collins/Lafayette Divestiture Trust	Classic rock
KFXZ	1520 AM	Lafayette	Delta Media Corporation	News/Talk
KFXZ-FM	105.9 FM	Opelousas	Delta Media Corporation	Urban adult contemporary
KGGM	93.9 FM	Delhi	Kenneth W. Diebel	Soft oldies
KGLA	830 AM	Norco	Crocodile Broadcasting Corporation, Inc.	Spanish contemporary
KGRM	91.5 FM	Grambling	Grambling College of Louisiana	Variety
KHCL	92.5 FM	Arcadia	Houston Christian Broadcasters, Inc.	Christian radio
KHLA	92.9 FM	Jennings	Townsquare License, LLC	Classic hits
KHLL	100.9 FM	Richwood	Gilliland, Inc.	Christian rock
KHMD	104.7 FM	Mansfield	Houston Christian Broadcasters, Inc.	Religious
KHPP-LP	106.9 FM	Sterlington	Glory2Glory Educational Foundation, Inc.	Religious Teaching
KHXT	107.9 FM	Erath	Townsquare Media of Lafayette, LLC	Rhythmic contemporary
KIEE	88.3 FM	St. Martinville	Southern Consumers Education Foundation	Variety
KIEZ-LP	106.7 FM	Monroe	Business Exchange Network, Inc.	Variety
KIKL	90.9 FM	Lafayette	Educational Media Foundation	Contemporary Christian (K-Love)
KIMW	105.5 FM	Heflin	CSN International	Religious (CSN International)
KIOU	1480 AM	Shreveport	Capital City Radio Corporation	Christian radio
KITA	89.5 FM	Iota	Educational Media Foundation	Worship music (Air1)
KIVD-LP	107.9 FM	Bossier City	Ministerio Evangelico Vision de Dios	Spanish Religious
KJAE	93.5 FM	Leesville	Pene Broadcasting Company, Inc.	Country
KJGM	88.3 FM	Bastrop	Family Worship Center, Inc.	Religious Teaching
KJIN	1490 AM	Houma	JLE, Incorporated	Urban adult contemporary
KJLO-FM	104.1 FM	Monroe	Holladay Broadcasting of Louisiana, LLC	Country
KJMG	97.3 FM	Bastrop	Skyline Media, LLC	Hot adult contemporary
KJMH	107.5 FM	Lake Arthur	Townsquare License, LLC	Urban contemporary
KJMJ	580 AM	Alexandria	Radio Maria, Inc.	Christian radio
KJNA-FM	102.7 FM	Jena	Cloessner News & Broadcasting LLC.	Classic country
KJVC	92.7 FM	Mansfield	Sputnik Media, LLC	Country
KKAY	1590 AM	White Castle	Liberty in Christ Jesus Ministry	Christian, gospel, state, and local sports.
KKGB	101.3 FM	Sulphur	Cumulus Licensing LLC	Classic rock
KKND	106.7 FM	Port Sulphur	Radio License Holding CBC, LLC	Sports
KKNO	750 AM	Gretna	Robert C. Blakes Enterprises, Inc.	Gospel
KKST	98.7 FM	Oakdale	Cenla Broadcasting Licensing Company, LLC	Urban contemporary
KLAA-FM	103.5 FM	Tioga	SMG-Alexandria, LLC	Country
KLCJ	104.1 FM	Oak Grove	Delta Media Corporation	Sports (ESPN)
KLCL	1470 AM	Lake Charles	Townsquare License, LLC	Silent
KLEB	1600 AM	Golden Meadow	Coastal Broadcasting of Larose, Inc.	Cajun music/Swamp pop/zydeco music
KLFT	90.5 FM	Kaplan	Talents Ministry, Inc.	Catholic
KLHV	88.5 FM	Cotton Valley	Educational Media Foundation	Contemporary Christian (K-Love)
KLIL	92.1 FM	Moreauville	Cajun Broadcasting, Inc.	Classic hits
KLIP	105.3 FM	Monroe	Holladay Broadcasting of Louisiana, LLC	Classic hits
KLKL	95.7 FM	Minden	Alpha Media Licensee LLC	Classic hits
KLLA	1570 AM	Leesville	Pene Broadcasting Company, Inc.	Oldies
KLNQ	106.5 FM	Atlanta	Educational Media Foundation	Contemporary Christian (K-Love)
KLPI	89.1 FM	Ruston	Louisiana Tech University	Alternative rock
KLPM-LP	102.5 FM	Lake Providence	Lake Providence School of Broadcasting, Inc.	Variety
KLRZ	100.3 FM	Larose	Coastal Broadcasting of Larose, Inc.	Urban contemporary
KLSA	90.7 FM	Alexandria	Bd Supervisors,	Public radio, NPR, PRI
KLSM	104.5 FM	Tallulah	Holladay Broadcasting of Louisiana, LLC	Hot adult contemporary
KLSP	91.7 FM	Angola	Louisiana State Penitentiary	Christian radio
KLSU	91.1 FM	Baton Rouge	Louisiana State University	Alternative music
KLWB-FM	103.7 FM	Carencro	Delta Media Corporation	Sports (ESPN)
KLXA	89.9 FM	Alexandria	Educational Media Foundation	Contemporary Christian (K-Love)
KLXE	93.5 FM	Calhoun	Educational Media Foundation	Contemporary Christian (K-Love)
KLXH	106.3 FM	Thibodaux	Educational Media Foundation	Contemporary Christian (K-Love)
KLXN	104.1 FM	Rosepine	Educational Media Foundation	Contemporary Christian (K-Love)
KMAR-FM	95.9 FM	Winnsboro	Bird Broadcasting Network, LLC	Country
KMDL	97.3 FM	Kaplan	Townsquare Media of Lafayette, LLC	Country
KMEZ	102.9 FM	Belle Chasse	Radio License Holding CBC, LLC	Urban adult contemporary
KMJJ-FM	99.7 FM	Shreveport	Cumulus Licensing LLC	Urban contemporary
KMLB	540 AM	Monroe	Holladay Broadcasting of Louisiana, LLC	Talk radio
KMRC	1430 AM	Morgan City	Spotlight Broadcasting of New Orleans, LLC	Ethnic Cajun
KMRL	91.9 FM	Buras-Triumph	American Family Association	Religious Talk (AFR)
KMSL	91.7 FM	Mansfield	American Family Association	Religious Talk (AFR)
KMVX	101.9 FM	Monroe	Holladay Broadcasting of Louisiana, LLC	Urban adult contemporary
KMXH	93.9 FM	Alexandria	JWBP Broadcasting, LLC	Urban adult contemporary
KMYY	92.3 FM	Rayville	SMG-Monroe, LLC	Country
KNBB	97.7 FM	Dubach	Red Peach LLC	Sports (FSR)
KNCB	1320 AM	Vivian	MLS Broadcasting Inc.	Classic rock
KNCB-FM	105.3 FM	Vivian	MLS Broadcasting Inc.	Classic country
KNEK-FM	104.7 FM	Washington	Radio License Holding CBC, LLC	Urban adult contemporary
KNGT	99.5 FM	Lake Charles	Townsquare License, LLC	Country
KNHS-LP	93.1 FM	Lafayette	Lafayette Parish School System	Variety
KNIR	1360 AM	New Iberia	Radio Maria, Inc.	Christian radio
KNNW	103.1 FM	Columbia	SMG-Monroe, LLC	Top 40 (CHR)
KNOL	107.5 FM	Jean Lafitte	Educational Media Foundation	Contemporary Christian (K-Love)
KNSU	91.5 FM	Thibodaux	Nicholls State University	Alternative rock with some other formats depending on the program.
KNWD	91.7 FM	Natchitoches	Northwestern State University	Alternative
KNXX	104.9 FM	Donaldsonville	Guaranty Broadcasting Company of Baton Rouge, LLC	Sports (ESPN)
KOCZ-LP	94.9 FM	Opelousas	Southern Development Foundation Field Office	Urban/Variety
KOGM	107.1 FM	Opelousas	Delta Media Corporation	Classic country
KOGQ-LP	98.9 FM	Oak Grove	Academy for Art, Crafts, Talent and Song, Inc.	Variety
KOJO	91.1 FM	Lake Charles	Radio Maria, Inc.	Christian radio
KOKA	980 AM	Shreveport	Alpha Media Licensee LLC	Black Gospel
KOUS-LP	96.3 FM	Monroe	Mahogony's Incubation System, Inc	Urban oldies
KPAE	91.5 FM	Erwinville	Port Allen Educational Broadcasting Foundation	Christian radio
KPAQ	88.1 FM	Plaquemine	American Family Association	Religious Talk (AFR)
KPCH	99.3 FM	Ruston	Red Peach LLC	Classic hits
KPCY-LP	89.9 FM	Lake Providence	Providence Church	Religious Teaching
KPEL	1420 AM	Lafayette	Townsquare Media of Lafayette, LLC	Sports (ESPN)
KPEL-FM	96.5 FM	Breaux Bridge	Townsquare Media of Lafayette, LLC	News/Talk
KPPM-LP	93.5 FM	Lake Charles	CCW Enterprises of Lake Charles	Gospel
KQFA-LP	104.1 FM	Lafayette	Lafayette Jesucristo es Mi Refugio	
KQID-FM	93.1 FM	Alexandria	Cenla Broadcasting Licensing Company, LLC	Top 40 (CHR)
KQJO	99.3 FM	St. Joseph	Black Media Works	Urban Gospel/Blues
KQKI-FM	95.3 FM	Bayou Vista	Teche Broadcasting Corporation	Country
KQLK	97.9 FM	DeRidder	Cumulus Licensing LLC	Country
KQWJ-LP	95.5 FM	Jonesboro	Grace Community Church of Jonesboro, Inc.	Religious Teaching
KQXL-FM	106.5 FM	New Roads	Radio License Holding CBC, LLC	Urban adult contemporary
KRGL	98.5 FM	Ringgold	Houston Christian Broadcasters, Inc.	Religious Teaching
KRJO	1680 AM	Monroe	Holladay Broadcasting of Louisiana, LLC	Classic country
KRLQ	94.1 FM	Hodge	North Louisiana Broadcasting, Inc.	Classic country
KRLR	89.1 FM	Sulphur	Educational Media Foundation	Contemporary Christian (K-Love)
KRMD-FM	101.1 FM	Oil City	Cumulus Licensing LLC	Country
KROF	960 AM	Abbeville	Townsquare Media of Lafayette, LLC	Talk
KROK	95.7 FM	Fort Johnson South	West Central Broadcasting Co., Inc.	Adult album alternative
KRRP	950 AM	Coushatta	Maria Hobbs, Administratrix of Estate of Frank Van Dyke Hobb	Gospel
KRRQ	95.5 FM	Lafayette	Radio License Holding CBC, LLC	Rhythmic contemporary
KRRV-FM	100.3 FM	Alexandria	Cenla Broadcasting Licensing Company, LLC	Country
KRUF	94.5 FM	Shreveport	Townsquare License, LLC	Top 40 (CHR)
KRUS	1490 AM	Ruston	Red Peach LLC	Black Gospel
KRVE	96.1 FM	Brusly	iHM Licenses, LLC	Adult contemporary
KRVS	88.7 FM	Lafayette	University of Louisiana at Lafayette	Public radio
KRVV	100.1 FM	Bastrop	Holladay Broadcasting of Louisiana, LLC	Urban contemporary
KSBU	92.7 FM	Delta	Holladay Broadcasting of Louisiana, LLC	Urban adult contemporary
KSCL	91.3 FM	Shreveport	Centenary College of Louisiana	College radio
KSIG	1450 AM	Crowley	Acadia Broadcast Partners, Inc.	Soft adult contemporary
KSJY	89.9 FM	St. Martinville	American Family Association	Religious Talk (AFR)
KSLO	1230 AM	Opelousas	Delta Media Corporation	Regional Mexican
KSLO-FM	105.3 FM	Simmesport	Delta Media Corporation	Zydeco
KSLU	90.9 FM	Hammond	Southeastern Louisiana University	Adult album alternative/Public radio/PRI
KSMB	94.5 FM	Lafayette	Radio License Holding CBC, LLC	Top 40 (CHR)
KSPH	92.9 FM	Springhill	Houston Christian Broadcasters, Inc.	Christian radio
KSYB	1300 AM	Shreveport	Amistad Communications, Inc.	Religious/Black Gospel
KSYL	970 AM	Alexandria	Cenla Broadcasting Licensing Company, LLC	News/Talk
KTDY	99.9 FM	Lafayette	Townsquare Media of Lafayette, LLC	Adult contemporary
KTEZ	99.9 FM	Zwolle	Baldridge-Dumas Communications, Inc.	Adult contemporary
KTIB	640 AM	Thibodaux	Gap Broadcasting, LLC	Spanish CHR
KTJZ	97.5 FM	Tallulah	Mid South Communications Company, Inc.	Urban contemporary
KTKC	1460 AM	Springhill	Houston Christian Broadcasters, Inc.	Spanish Christian
KTLN	90.5 FM	Thibodaux	University of New Orleans	Classical music
KTOC-FM	104.9 FM	Jonesboro	Family Worship Center Church, Inc.	Religious
KTSR	92.1 FM	DeQuincy	Townsquare License, LLC	Contemporary Christian
KTTP	1110 AM	Pineville	Radio Two, LLC	Gospel
KUHN	88.9 FM	Golden Meadow	United Houma Nation, Inc.	Variety
KUMX	106.7 FM	Fort Johnson North	West Central Broadcasting Co., Inc	Adult contemporary
KURC-LP	95.7 FM	Bastrop	The Upper Room Church Ministries	Religious Teaching
KVCL-FM	92.1 FM	Winnfield	Baldridge-Dumas Communications, Inc.	Country
KVDP	89.1 FM	Dry Prong	Dry Prong Educational Broadcasting Foundation Inc.	Religious
KVDU	104.1 FM	Gonzales	iHM Licenses, LLC	Urban adult contemporary
KVFZ	92.1 FM	Benton	6102 Seawall, LLC	Contemporary Latino
KVKI-FM	96.5 FM	Shreveport	Townsquare License, LLC	Adult contemporary
KVMA-FM	102.9 FM	Shreveport	Cumulus Licensing LLC	Soul/R&B Oldies-leaning urban adult contemporary
KVOL	1330 AM	Lafayette	Delta Media Corporation	Soft oldies
KVPI	1050 AM	Ville Platte	Ville Platte Broadcasting Co., Inc.	Classic country
KVPI-FM	92.5 FM	Ville Platte	Ville Platte Broadcasting Co., Inc.	Classic hits
KVSE	89.1 FM	Blanchard	Educational Radio Foundation of East Texas, Inc.	Contemporary Christian
KVVP	105.7 FM	Leesville	Stannard Broadcasting Co., Inc.	Country
KWCL-FM	96.7 FM	Oak Grove	Holland Broadcasting, LLC	Hot adult contemporary
KWDF	840 AM	Ball	Capital City Radio Corporation	Contemporary Christian
KWKH	1130 AM	Shreveport	Townsquare License, LLC	Classic country
KWLA	103.1 FM	Anacoco	Baldridge-Dumas Communications, Inc.	News/Talk
KWLL-FM	106.7 FM	Rayne	Broadcast Partners, Inc.	Soft oldies
KWLV	107.1 FM	Many	Baldridge-Dumas Communications, Inc.	Country
KWMZ-FM	104.5 FM	Empire	M.A.C. Broadcasting, LLC	1980s' hits
KWRJ-LP	106.3 FM	Elton	Coushatta Tribe of Louisiana	Variety
KWTG	104.7 FM	Vidalia	Miss Lou Media, LLC	Classic country
KWXM	102.3 FM	Simsboro	North Louisiana Broadcasting, Inc.	Urban oldies
KXKC	99.1 FM	New Iberia	Radio License Holding CBC, LLC	Classic country
KXKS-FM	93.7 FM	Shreveport	Townsquare License, LLC	Country
KXKZ	107.5 FM	Ruston	Red Peach LLC	Country
KXRR	106.1 FM	Monroe	SMG-Monroe, LLC	Mainstream rock
KXUL	91.1 FM	Monroe	University of Louisiana	Alternative rock
KYBG	102.1 FM	Basile	Third Partner Broadcasting, Inc.	Classic hits
KYFJ	93.7 FM	New Iberia	Bible Broadcasting Network, Incorporated	Conservative religious (Bible Broadcasting Network)
KYFL	89.5 FM	Monroe	Bible Broadcasting Network, Inc.	Conservative religious (Bible Broadcasting Network)
KYKZ	96.1 FM	Lake Charles	Cumulus Licensing LLC	Country
KYLC	90.3 FM	Lake Charles	American Family Association	Inspirational (AFR)
KYMK-FM	106.3 FM	Maurice	Delta Media Corporation	Adult album alternative
KYSW-LP	92.7 FM	Slidell	Spokesman Among Women Educational Organization, Inc.	Christian radio
KYXA	106.7 FM	Homer	Educational Media Foundation	Worship music (Air1)
KZBL	100.7 FM	Natchitoches	Baldridge-Dumas Communications, Inc.	Oldies
KZJM-LP	92.7 FM	Lafayette	M&M Community Development (Lafayette Branch)	Urban
KZKR	105.1 FM	Jonesville	First Natchez Radio Group Inc	Classic rock
KZLC-LP	95.5 FM	Pineville	Louisiana College	Contemporary Christian
KZLG	95.9 FM	Mansura	Cajun Broadcasting, Inc.	Adult contemporary
KZMZ	96.9 FM	Alexandria	Cenla Broadcasting Licensing Company, LLC	Classic rock
KZRZ	98.3 FM	West Monroe	SMG-Monroe, LLC	Adult contemporary
KZWA	104.9 FM	Moss Bluff	B & C Broadcasting Ltd	Urban contemporary
WABL	1570 AM	Amite City	Ericka Taylor	Classic hits
WAMF-LP	90.3 FM	New Orleans	Affiliated Media Foundation Movement, Inc.	Variety
WBKL	92.7 FM	Clinton	Educational Media Foundation	Contemporary Christian (K-Love)
WBOK	1230 AM	New Orleans	Equity Media LLC	Gospel
WBOX	920 AM	Bogalusa	Best Country Broadcasting, LLC	Country
WBOX-FM	92.9 FM	Varnado	Best Country Broadcasting, LLC	Country
WBRH	90.3 FM	Baton Rouge	East Baton Rouge Parish Public Schools Board	Jazz/NPR
WBRJ-LP	97.3 FM	Baton Rouge	Jefferson Baptist Church, Inc.	Christian contemporary
WBRP	107.3 FM	Baker	Guaranty Broadcasting Company of Baton Rouge, LLC	Talk
WBSN-FM	89.1 FM	New Orleans	Providence Educational Foundation	Contemporary Christian
WCKW	1010 AM	Garyville	Covenant Network	Catholic
WDGL	98.1 FM	Baton Rouge	Guaranty Broadcasting Company of Baton Rouge, LLC	Classic rock
WEMX	94.1 FM	Kentwood	Radio License Holding CBC, LLC	Urban contemporary
WETH	94.3 FM	Harrisonburg	Eternity Records Company, LLC	
WEZB	97.1 FM	New Orleans	Audacy License, LLC	Top 40 (CHR)
WFFX	103.7 FM	Marrero	iHM Licenses, LLC	Hot adult contemporary
WFMF	102.5 FM	Baton Rouge	iHM Licenses, LLC	Top 40 (CHR)
WFNO	1540 AM	Gretna	Crocodile Broadcasting Corp., Inc.	Spanish tropical
WFPR	1400 AM	Hammond	North Shore Broadcasting Co., Inc.	Classic country
WGON-LP	103.7 FM	Slidell	First Pentecostal Church of Slidell	Christian radio
WGSO	990 AM	New Orleans	Northshore Radio, LLC	News/Talk, Sports
WGUO	94.9 FM	Reserve	Southeastern Broadcasting, Inc.	Classic country
WGUP-LP	107.9 FM	LaPlace	Fr Double E Outreach Ministry	Urban Gospel
WHFF-LP	100.1 FM	Hammond	Northshore Community Broadcasters, Inc.	Contemporary Christian
WHFG	91.3 FM	Broussard	Mary V. Harris Foundation	Religious
WHIV-LP	102.3 FM	New Orleans	New Orleans Society for Infectious Diseases Awareness	Variety
WHMD	107.1 FM	Hammond	North Shore Broadcasting Co., Inc.	Country
WHYR-LP	96.9 FM	Baton Rouge	The Baton Rouge Progressive Network	Variety
WJBO	1150 AM	Baton Rouge	iHM Licenses, LLC	News/Talk
WJFM	88.5 FM	Baton Rouge	Family Worship Center Church, Inc.	Christian radio
WJSH	104.7 FM	Folsom	North Shore Broadcasting Co., Inc.	Classic country
WKBU	95.7 FM	New Orleans	Audacy License, LLC	Classic rock
WKSH-LP	97.7 FM	Shreveport	Amore Entertainment Radio	Urban
WLMG	101.9 FM	New Orleans	Audacy License, LLC	Adult contemporary
WMIY-LP	93.1 FM	Baton Rouge	Molding Inner Youth	Urban Gospel
WNLS	91.3 FM	Slidell	Providence Educational Foundation	Contemporary Christian
WNOE-FM	101.1 FM	New Orleans	iHM Licenses, LLC	Country
WNOZ-LP	95.3 FM	New Orleans	M&M Community Development Inc New Orleans Branch	Smooth jazz
WNXX	104.5 FM	Jackson	Guaranty Broadcasting Company of Baton Rouge, LLC	Sports (ESPN)
WODT	1280 AM	New Orleans	iHM Licenses, LLC	Black-oriented news
WOMN	1110 AM	Franklinton	Pittman Broadcasting Services, LLC	Country
WOTB	88.7 FM	Pearl River	New Horizon Christian Fellowship	Contemporary Christian
WPFC	1550 AM	Baton Rouge	Victory & Power Ministries	Urban gospel, Talk
WPYR	1380 AM	Baton Rouge	Catholic Community Radio, Inc.	Catholic
WPYR-LP	105.9 FM	Baton Rouge	The Sister Dulce Foundation, Inc.	Religious Teaching
WQNO	690 AM	New Orleans	Catholic Community Radio, Inc.	Catholic
WQUE-FM	93.3 FM	New Orleans	iHM Licenses, LLC	Mainstream urban
WRBH	88.3 FM	New Orleans	Radio for the Blind and Handicapped, Inc.	Services and programs for the blind and disabled.
WRKF	89.3 FM	Baton Rouge	Public radio Inc.	Public radio, NPR, PRI
WRNO-FM	99.5 FM	New Orleans	iHM Licenses, LLC	Talk
WRNV	91.1 FM	Norco	Educational Media Foundation	Spanish language Christian
WRQQ	103.3 FM	Hammond	Radio License Holding CBC, LLC	Classic hits
WSGX-LP	95.1 FM	East Baton Rouge	Chamber of Commerce of East Baton Rouge	Classic hits
WSHO	800 AM	New Orleans	Shadowlands Communications, L.L.C.	Christian radio
WSLA	1560 AM	Slidell	Mapa Broadcasting, L.L.C.	News/Talk, Sports
WTGE	100.7 FM	Baton Rouge	Guaranty Broadcasting Company of Baton Rouge, LLC	Country
WTGG	96.5 FM	Amite City	North Shore Broadcasting Co., Inc.	Oldies
WTIX-FM	94.3 FM	Galliano	Fleur De Lis Broadcasting, Inc.	Oldies
WTQT-LP	106.1 FM	Baton Rouge	Louisiana Community Development Capital Fund, Inc.	Urban Gospel
WTUL	91.5 FM	New Orleans	Tulane Educational Fund	Progressive music
WUBR	910 AM	Baton Rouge	Power 102.1 FM LLC	Regional Mexican
WUUU	98.9 FM	Franklinton	Pittman Broadcasting Services, LLC	Country
WVDL-LP	95.1 FM	New Orleans	Vietnamese American Young Leaders Association of New Orleans	Variety
WVOG	600 AM	New Orleans	F.W. Robert Broadcasting Co., Inc.	Christian radio
WWL	870 AM	New Orleans	Audacy License, LLC	News/Talk, Sports
WWL-FM	105.3 FM	Kenner	Audacy License, LLC	News/Talk, Sports
WWNO	89.9 FM	New Orleans	University of New Orleans	Public radio - Talk/NPR/PRI/American Public Media
WWOZ	90.7 FM	New Orleans	Friends of WWOZ, Inc.	Jazz, Blues, and New Orleans Community Music.
WWRA	91.9 FM	Clinton	Victory Harvest Church	Spanish language Christian
WWWL	1350 AM	New Orleans	Audacy License, LLC	Sports gambling
WXDR-LP	99.1 FM	New Orleans	Delgado Community College	Variety
WXNO-LP	93.7 FM	New Orleans	New Orleans Community Radio	
WXOK	1460 AM	Port Allen	Radio License Holding CBC, LLC	Gospel
WYLD	940 AM	New Orleans	iHM Licenses, LLC	Urban contemporary gospel
WYLD-FM	98.5 FM	New Orleans	iHM Licenses, LLC	Urban adult contemporary
WYLK	94.7 FM	Lacombe	North Shore Broadcasting Co., Inc.	Hot adult contemporary
WYNK-FM	101.5 FM	Baton Rouge	iHM Licenses, LLC	Country
WZEN-LP	107.9 FM	Hammond	Parentcorp Foundation	Variety
WZRH	92.3 FM	LaPlace	Radio License Holding CBC, LLC	Alternative rock

== Defunct ==
- KANB
- KBYO
- KCJM-LP
- KCRJ-LP
- KDLA
- KEPZ
- KEZM
- KJCB
- KJEF
- KLIC
- KMBS
- KMCZ
- KMLB (1440 AM)
- KNEK
- KNOC
- KPCP
- KPEF
- KRMD
- KSBH
- KWHN-FM
- KXZZ
- WBYU
- WIBR
- WJVI
- WLNO
- WLRO
- WPEF

== See also ==
- Louisiana media
  - List of newspapers in Louisiana
  - List of television stations in Louisiana
  - Media of locales in Louisiana: Baton Rouge, Lafayette, Monroe, New Orleans, Shreveport, Terrebonne Parish

== Bibliography ==
- Jack Alicoate, ed. (1939), "Louisiana", Radio Annual, New York: Radio Daily, OCLC 2459636 – via Internet Archive
- "AM Stations in the U.S.: Louisiana", Radio Annual Television Year Book, New York: Radio Television Daily, 1963, OCLC 10512375 – via Internet Archive
- Beth Norwood (1964). "French Radio Broadcasting in Louisiana". Southern Speech Journal. 30. Southern Association of Teachers of Speech. ISSN 0038-4585.

== Images ==
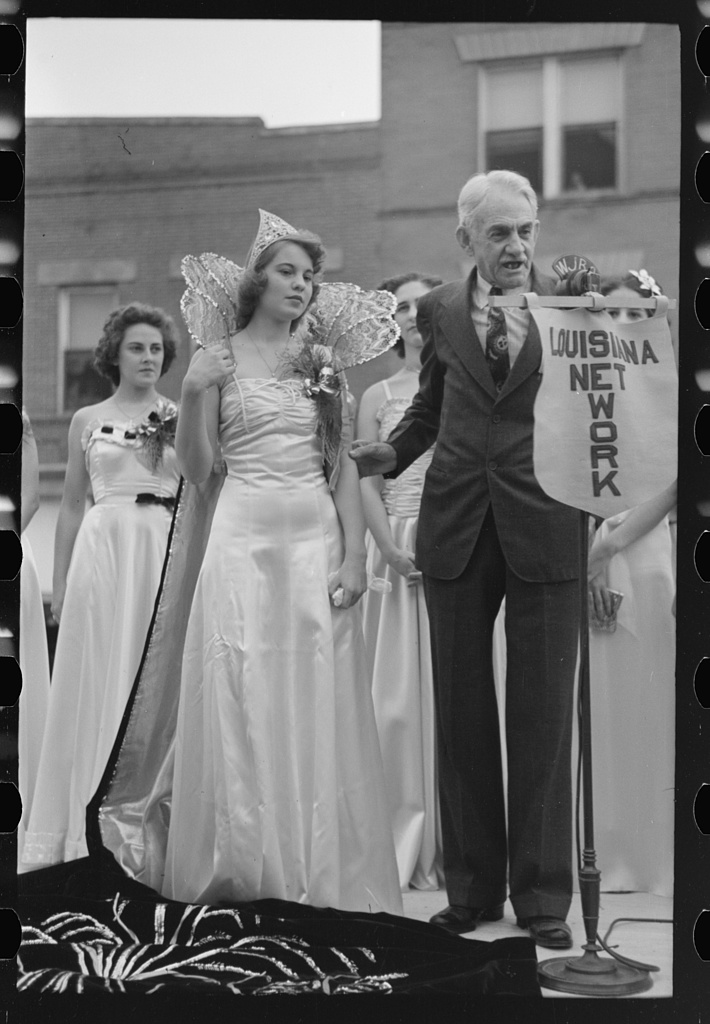
WJBO radio event in Crowley, Louisiana, 1938

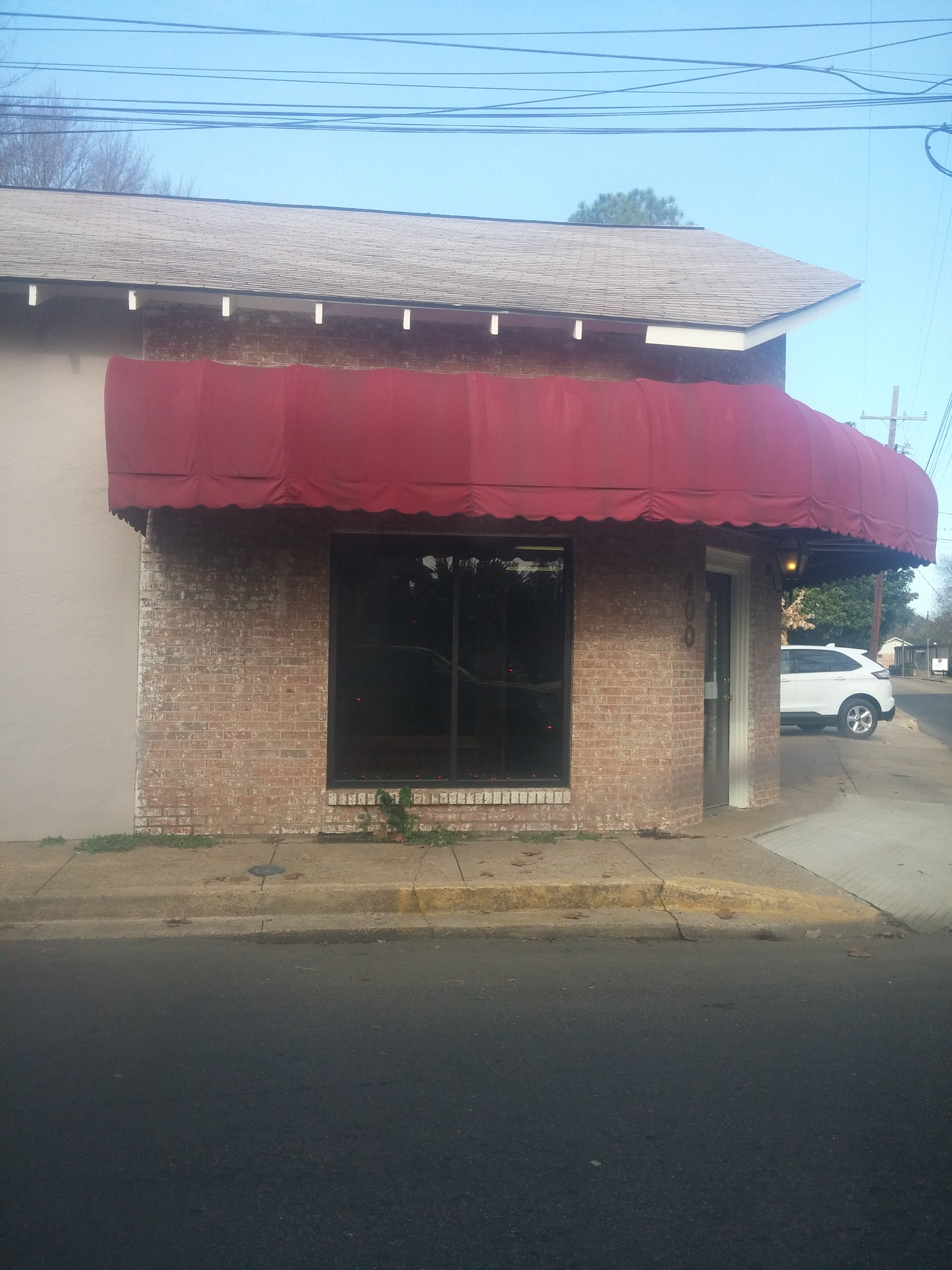
Building of KZBL and KDBH radio stations in Natchitoches, Louisiana, 2016

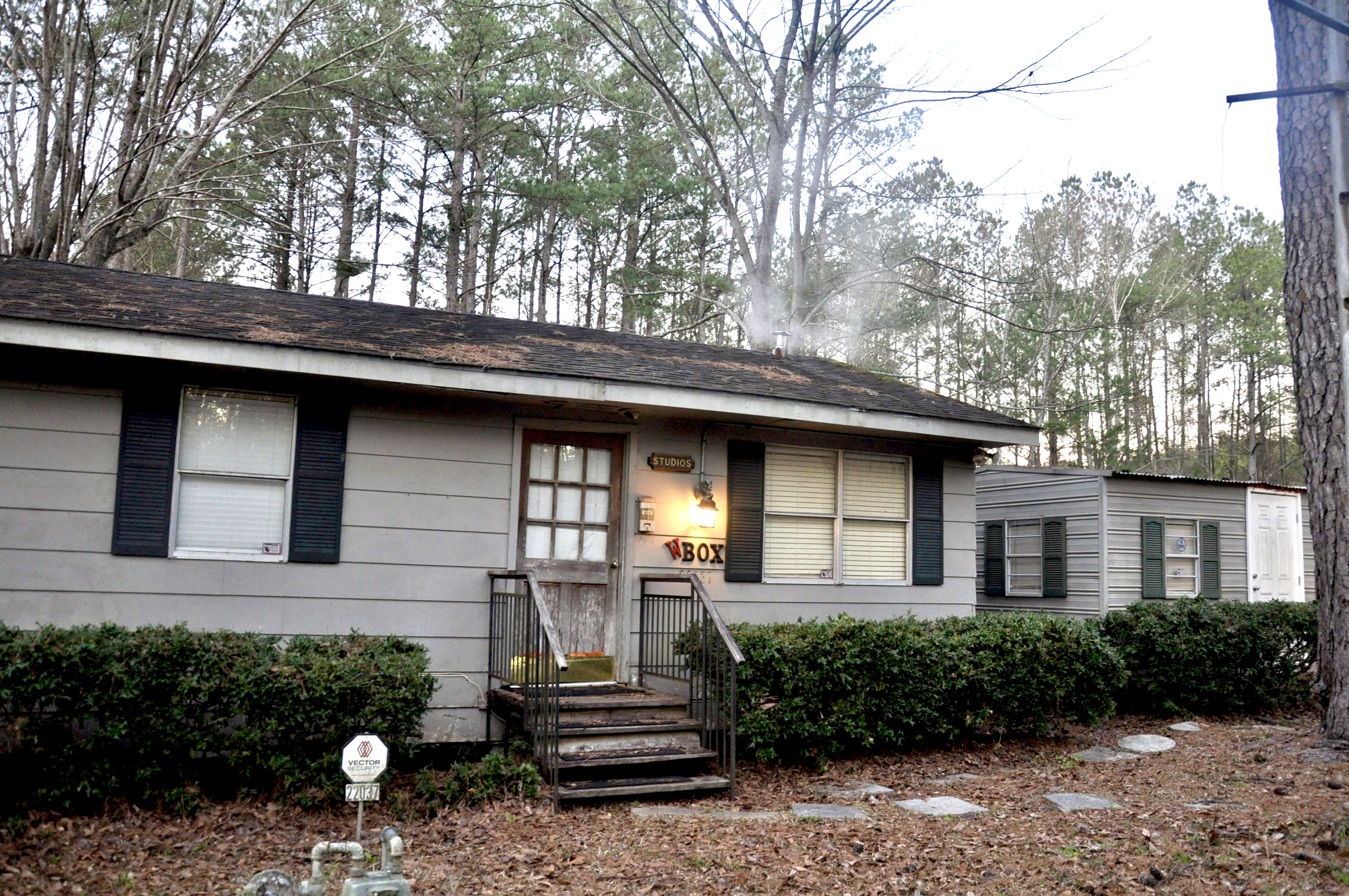
Building of WBOX in Bogalusa, Louisiana, 2024
