= Mass media in New Orleans =

Mass media in New Orleans serve a large population in the New Orleans area as well as southeastern Louisiana and coastal Mississippi.

== Newspapers ==
Historically, the major newspaper in the area has been The Times-Picayune; it is published daily. The "Times-Pic" made headlines of its own in 2012 when owner Advance Publications cut back from daily publication, instead focusing its efforts on its website, nola.com. That action briefly made New Orleans the largest city in the country without a daily newspaper, until the Baton Rouge newspaper The Advocate began a New Orleans edition in 2013. Later in 2013 the New Orleans edition became The New Orleans Advocate. In 2019, the papers merged to form The Times-Picayune | The New Orleans Advocate.

The New Orleans Tribune and The Louisiana Weekly serve the city with an African American focus. The Clarion Herald is the official newspaper of the Roman Catholic Archdiocese of New Orleans. OffBeat is a monthly music magazine. Gambit is a free alternative weekly newspaper; Where Y'at? is a free monthly. Healthcare Journal of New Orleans covers the city's healthcare issues. The Tulane Hullabaloo is the weekly student-run newspaper of Tulane University. New Orleans CityBusiness is published in Metairie, but covers the weekly business news of the New Orleans metropolitan area. The Neutral Ground News is an Onion-like, online satirical news publication focusing on the people, places and things of the greater New Orleans area.

== Television ==
=== Full-power ===
- 4 WWL-TV New Orleans (CBS)
- 6 WDSU New Orleans (NBC)
- 8 WVUE-DT New Orleans (Fox)
- 12 WYES-TV New Orleans (PBS)
- 20 WHNO New Orleans (CTN)
- 26 WGNO New Orleans (ABC)
- 32 WLAE-TV New Orleans (Public independent)
- 38 WNOL-TV New Orleans (The CW)**
- 42 KGLA-DT Hammond (Telemundo)
- 49 WPXL-TV New Orleans (Ion Television)**
- 54 WUPL Slidell (Independent with MyNetworkTV)

=== Low-power ===
- 22 WTNO-CD New Orleans
- 28 KNLD-LD New Orleans (Daystar)**
- 30 KFOL-CD Houma (Independent)
- 33 WQDT-LD New Orleans
- 41 KNOV-CD New Orleans (Tourist Info)
- 47 K20MM-D New Orleans (HSN)

== Radio ==
=== AM ===
- 600 WVOG New Orleans (Christian radio/southern gospel)
- 690 WQNO New Orleans (Catholic radio)
- 750 KKNO Gretna (Gospel/brokered-WBOK simulcast)
- 800 WSHO New Orleans (Christian radio/music)
- 830 KGLA Norco (Tropical music)
- 870 WWL New Orleans (Talk/sports)
- 940 WYLD New Orleans (Urban gospel)
- 990 WGSO New Orleans (Brokered/talk)
- 1010 WCKW Garyville (Catholic/Covenant Network)
- 1230 WBOK New Orleans (Gospel/brokered)
- 1280 WODT New Orleans (Black Information Network)
- 1320 WRJW Picayune, MS (Country)
- 1350 WWWL New Orleans (Sports/talk)
- 1540 WFNO Gretna (Spanish Tropical)
- 1560 WSLA Slidell (Talk/sports)

=== FM ===
- 88.3 WRBH New Orleans (Radio reading service)
- 89.1 WBSN-FM New Orleans (Contemporary Christian music)
- 89.9 WWNO New Orleans (Public radio/NPR/talk)
- 90.7 WWOZ New Orleans (Jazz/blues/community)
- 91.1 WRNV Norco (Radio Nueva Vida)
- 91.5 WTUL New Orleans (College/progressive/Tulane University)
- 92.3 WZRH LaPlace (Alternative)
- 93.3 WQUE-FM New Orleans (Mainstream urban)
- 94.3 WTIX-FM Galliano (Oldies)
- 94.9 WGUO Reserve (Classic country)
- 95.7 WKBU New Orleans (Classic rock)
- 97.1 WEZB New Orleans (Contemporary hit radio)
- 98.5 WYLD-FM New Orleans (Urban adult contemporary)
- 98.9 WUUU Franklinton (Contemporary hit radio)
- 99.5 WRNO-FM New Orleans (Talk radio)
- 100.3 KLRZ Larose (Sports)
- 100.7 WTGE Baton Rouge (Country)
- 101.1 WNOE-FM New Orleans (Country)
- 101.9 WLMG New Orleans (Adult contemporary)
- 102.3 WHIV-LP New Orleans (Community radio)
- 102.9 KMEZ Belle Chasse (Urban AC)
- 104.1 KVDU Gonzales (Hot adult contemporary)
- 104.5 KWMZ-FM Empire (1980s hits)
- 105.3 WWL-FM Kenner (Talk/sports-WWL simulcast)
- 106.1 WRKN Picayune, MS (Country)
- 106.7 KKND Port Sulphur (Urban adult contemporary)
- 107.5 KNOL Jean Lafitte (Spanish Top 40)

=== Internet ===
- Crescent City Radio (Loyola University New Orleans)

== See also ==
- New Orleans in fiction
- Louisiana media
  - List of newspapers in Louisiana
  - List of radio stations in Louisiana
  - List of television stations in Louisiana
  - Media of locales in Louisiana: Baton Rouge, Lafayette, Monroe, Shreveport, Terrebonne Parish

== Bibliography ==
- Stuart Babington (2010). "Shell-Shocked in New Orleans: A Competitive Press During a Bloody Season, January 1973". American Journalism. 27: 63–85.
- Bala Baptiste (2013). "How Disc Jockey Vernon Winslow, aka Dr. Daddy-O, Racially Integrated Radio in New Orleans and Changed the Culture of the Medium". Louisiana History. 54.
