= Mass media in Monroe, Louisiana =

This is a list of mass media in Monroe, Louisiana, United States.

== Television ==
Call Letters	Signal Type	Channel	Network	Owner
KNOE-TV	Digital	8	CBS	Gray Television
KNOE-DT2	Digital	8.2 (12)	ABC	Gray Television
KNOE-DT3	Digital	8.3 (12)	The CW	Gray Television
KTVE-TV	Digital	10	NBC	Mission Broadcasting
KARD-TV	Digital	14 (9)	Fox	Nexstar Broadcasting Group, Inc.
KMLU	Digital	11	Me-TV	Legacy Broadcasting
KLTM-TV	Digital	13	PBS	Louisiana Public Broadcasting
KMCT-TV	Digital	22	MyNetworkTV	Lamb Broadcasting, Inc

- KEJB did not receive a companion channel for a digital television station. Instead, on or before June 12, 2009, which is the end of the digital TV conversion period for full-service stations, KEJB was required to turn off its analog signal and turn on its digital signal (called a "flash-cut"). While a digital signal did go on the air (though it shut down on June 4, 2010, due to equipment failure, the station never filed for either a license to cover or an extension of the construction permit, and it was deleted by the FCC on December 22, 2010.

== Radio ==
=== AM stations ===
Frequency	Callsign	Nickname	Format	Owner
540	KMLB	Talk 540	News/Talk	Holladay Broadcasting, LLC
1310	KMBS	Redden Radio 1310	Talk	Red Bear Broadcasting Corporation
1680	KRJO	99.7 The Legend	Classic country	Holladay Broadcasting of Louisiana, LLC

=== FM stations ===
Frequency	Callsign	Branding	Format	Owner
88.7	KBMQ	88.7 The Cross	Contemporary Christian	Media Ministries
90.3	KEDM	90.3 KEDM	NPR/News	University of Louisiana at Monroe
91.1	KXUL	91X New Rock	Alternative rock	University of Louisiana at Monroe
92.3	KMYY	Anything Country	Country	Opus Broadcasting Monroe, LLC
92.7	KBYO	Power 92.7	Christian contemporary	Union Broadcasting Co.
93.9	KGGM		Gospel Music	Kenneth W. Diebel
95.3	KEWZ		Easy Listening	West Monroe Community Radio
95.7	KBFA	Radio 74 International	Religious	West Monroe Adventist Educational Broadcasting Corporation
95.9	KMAR	True Country	Country	Bird Broadcasting Network, LLC, Winnsboro
96.3	KOUS		Urban oldies	Mahogony's Incubation System, Inc
97.3	KJMG	Magic 97	Urban Contemporary	Skyline Media, LLC
97.7	KNBB	ESPN Radio 97.7	Sports/Sports Talk	Red Peach LLC, Ruston
98.3	KZRZ	Sunny 98.3	Adult contemporary	Opus Broadcasting Monroe, LLC
98.9	K255BT	The Heart and Soul of Cenla	Gospel Music	
99.7	K259CU	99.7 The Legend	Classic country	Holladay Broadcasting of Louisiana, LLC
100.1	KRVV	100.1 The Beat	Hip-Hop	Holladay Broadcasting of Louisiana, LLC
100.9	KHLL	The Hill 100.9	Christian Contemporary	Gilliland, Inc.
101.9	KMVX	Mix 101.9	Urban Contemporary	Holladay Broadcasting of Louisiana, LLC
103.1	KNNW	103.1 Now FM	Top-40	Opus Broadcasting Monroe, LLC
104.1	KJLO	K-104	Country	Holladay Broadcasting of Louisiana, LLC
105.3	KLIP	LA 105.3	Classic Hits	Holladay Broadcasting of Louisiana, LLC
106.1	KXRR	Rock 106	Rock	Opus Broadcasting Monroe, LLC
107.5	KXKZ	Z 107.5	Country	Red Peach LLC, Ruston

== Newspapers ==
=== Daily ===
The major daily newspaper serving the Monroe-West Monroe and Ark-La-Miss area is Monroe News-Star. Its headquarters are located in midtown Monroe.

Ouachita Parish is served by the daily The Ouachita Citizen.

=== Non-daily ===
Name
Monroe Free Press
The Monroe Dispatch

The Delta Style (part of Monroe News Star) and Money Saver serve Northeast Louisiana, Southeast Arkansas, and Western Mississippi.

== See also ==
- Louisiana media
  - List of newspapers in Louisiana
  - List of radio stations in Louisiana
  - List of television stations in Louisiana
  - Media of locales in Louisiana: Baton Rouge, Lafayette, New Orleans, Shreveport, Terrebonne Parish
