= New Orleans metropolitan area =

Metropolitan area

New Orleans metropolitan area New Orleans–Metairie MSA
- Metropolitan statistical area
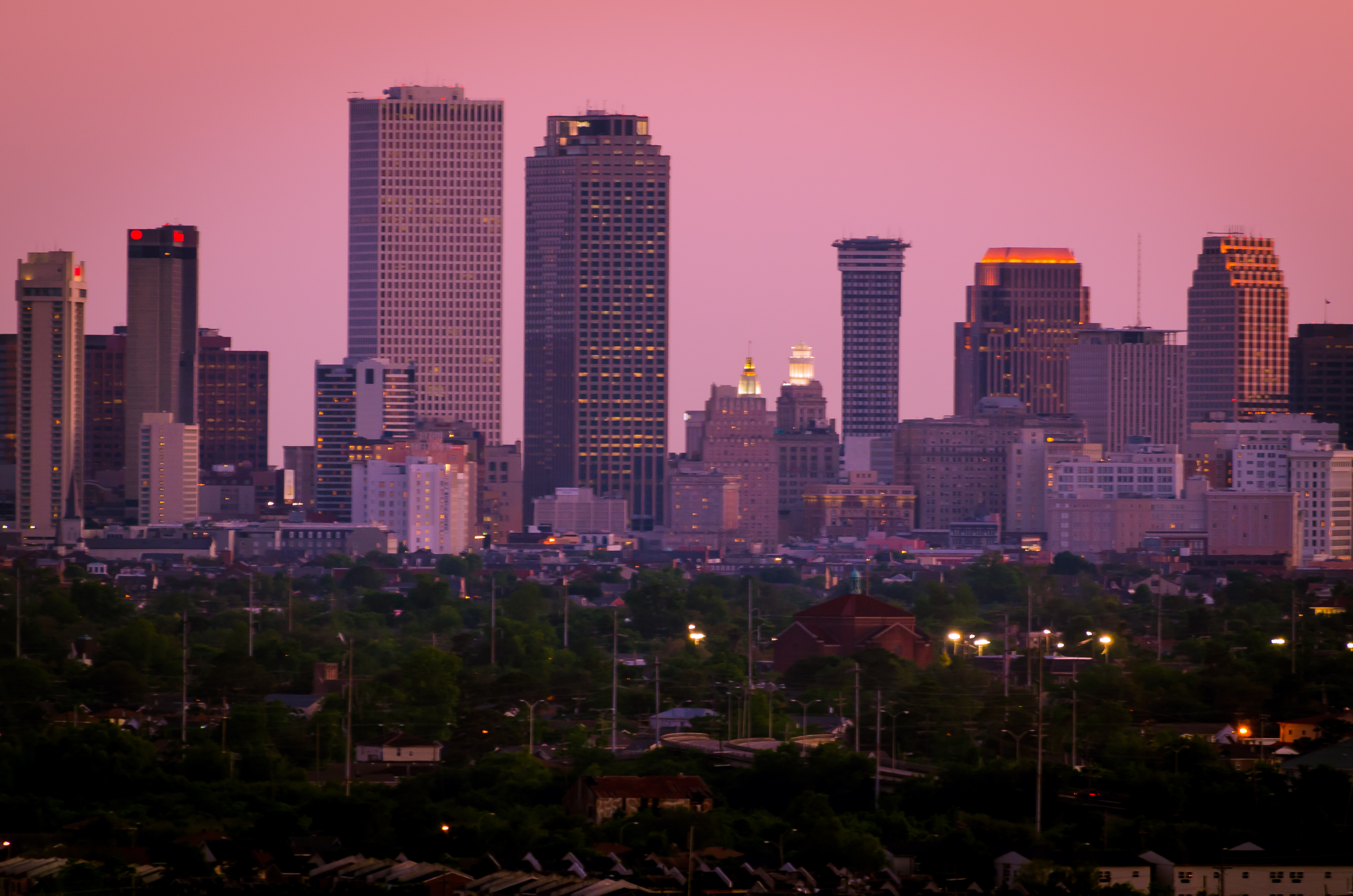
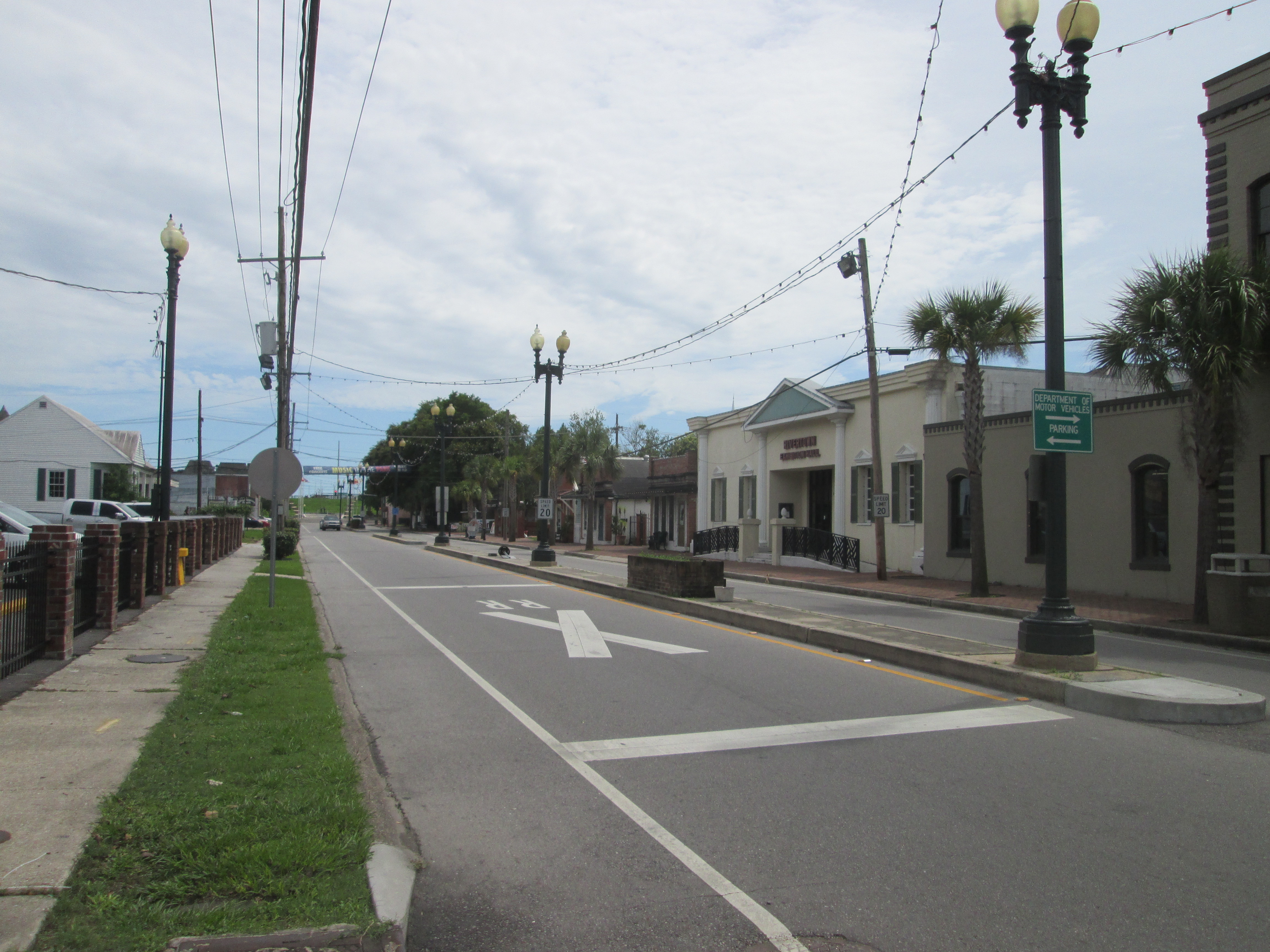
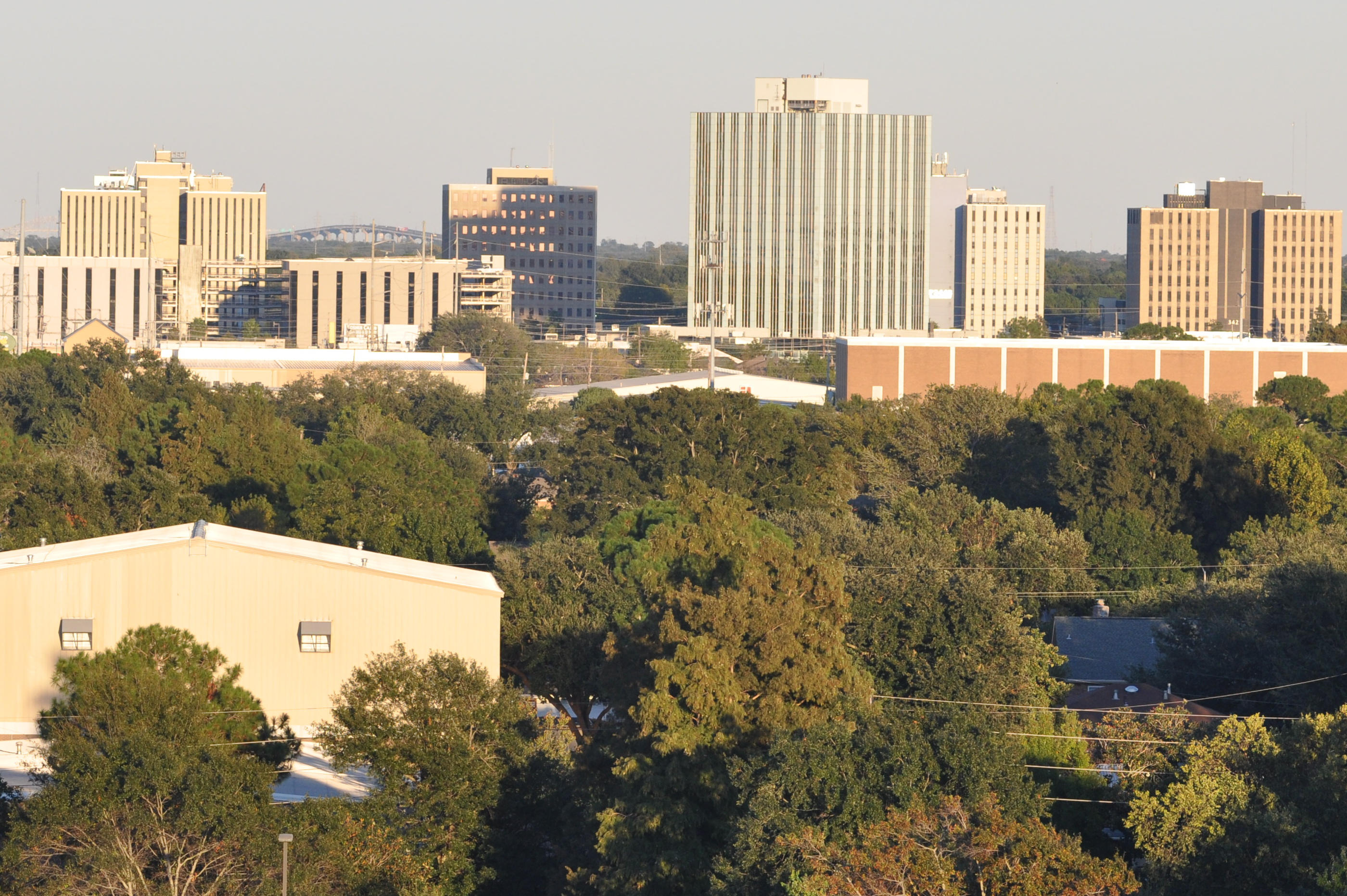
- From top: New Orleans, Kenner, Metairie, showcasing Downtown New Orleans, Kenner Old Rivertown, and Metairie Central Business District

- Location of the New Orleans–Metairie–Slidell CSA and its components: New Orleans–Metairie MSA Slidell–Mandeville–Covington, MSA Bogalusa μSA Picayune μSA Louisiana Mississippi
- Coordinates: 29°43′N 90°22′W
- Country: United States
- State(s): Louisiana; Mississippi
- Largest city: New Orleans
- Other cities: • Kenner • Gretna

Area
  - Total: 3,755.2 sq mi (9,726 km^{2})
- Highest elevation: 371 ft (113 m)
- Lowest elevation: −6.6 ft (−2 m)

Population (2020)
  - Total: 1,007,275
  - Rank: 59th
  - Density: 310/sq mi (120/km^{2})

GDP
  - Total: $102.437 billion (2023)
- Time zone: UTC-6 (CST)
  - Summer (DST): UTC-5 (CDT)
- Area codes: 504, 985

The New Orleans metropolitan area, designated the New Orleans–Metairie metropolitan statistical area by the U.S. Office of Management and Budget, or simply Greater New Orleans, is a metropolitan statistical area designated by the United States Census Bureau encompassing seven Louisiana parishes—the equivalent of counties in other U.S. states—centered on the city of New Orleans. The population of Greater New Orleans was 1,007,275 in 2020. Greater New Orleans is the most populous metropolitan area in Louisiana, and the 59th most populous in the United States. The broader New Orleans–Metairie–Slidell combined statistical area had a population of 1,354,257 in 2025.

The New Orleans metropolitan area was devastated by Hurricane Katrina—once a category 5 hurricane, but a category 3 storm at landfall—on August 29, 2005. Within the city of New Orleans proper, multiple breaches and structural failures occurred in the system of levees and flood walls designed under federal government auspices. The city of New Orleans experienced a steep population decline after the hurricane, though by the 2020 census, it had regained a good portion of that loss.

The post-August 2005 decline in the city's population negatively impacted population numbers for the entire metropolitan area, which had a population of 1,337,726 as recorded in the 2000 United States census. Most of the decline in population was accounted for by the decline experienced in the city of New Orleans proper (coterminous with Orleans Parish); the U.S. Census Bureau estimates that the city's population dropped from 453,728 prior to the storm (July 1, 2005) to 389,476, the estimate for 2020.

Greater New Orleans is the largest regional economy in Louisiana and borders the second largest economically-important area, Greater Baton Rouge. One Fortune 500 company is headquartered in the region, Entergy. The largest companies operating in the New Orleans metropolitan area are Globalstar, AT&T, GE Capital, and the Port of New Orleans. Home to some of Louisiana's most-visited tourist destinations, tourists have spent over $10.05 billion in 2019.

== Geography ==
For U.S. census purposes, the New Orleans–Metairie metropolitan statistical area includes seven parishes: Jefferson, Orleans (coterminous with the city of New Orleans), Plaquemines, St. Bernard, St. Charles, St. James, and St. John the Baptist.

St. Tammany, Tangipahoa, and Washington parishes all lie across Lake Ponchartrain from New Orleans, and are oftentimes included as part of the region.

According to the New Orleans region's chamber of commerce, GNO, Inc. (formerly Metrovision), the region boasts a civilian labor force of over 650,000 and there are over 65,000 students enrolled in the region's nine universities and eight community/technical colleges.

The Louisiana State Legislature created a commission (the Regional Planning Commission) to be responsible for the planning and development of the New Orleans metropolitan area. The eight parishes covered by the commission are: Jefferson, Orleans, Plaquemines, St. Bernard, St. Charles, St. John the Baptist, St. Tammany and Tangipahoa.

Each parish within the New Orleans metropolitan area and New Orleans–Metairie–Slidell combined statistical areas lie on a very low sea level elevation, though further inland near the Mississippi border its area above sea level increases to 371 feet.

== Principal communities ==
=== Principal city ===
- New Orleans

=== Satellite cities (places with over 50,000 inhabitants) ===
- Kenner
- Metairie (unincorporated)

=== Places between 10,000 and 50,000 inhabitants ===
- Belle Chasse (unincorporated)
- Chalmette (unincorporated)
- Destrehan (unincorporated)
- Estelle (unincorporated)
- Gretna
- Hammond
- Harvey (unincorporated)
- Jefferson (unincorporated)
- LaPlace (unincorporated)
- Luling (unincorporated)
- Marrero (unincorporated)
- Meraux (unincorporated)
- River Ridge (unincorporated)
- Terrytown (unincorporated)
- Timberlane (unincorporated)
- Woodmere (unincorporated)

=== Places with fewer than 10,000 inhabitants ===
- Ama (unincorporated)
- Arabi (unincorporated)
- Avondale (unincorporated)
- Barataria (unincorporated)
- Boutte (unincorporated)
- Bridge City (unincorporated)
- Convent (unincorporated)
- Edgard (unincorporated)
- Elmwood (unincorporated)
- Garyville (unincorporated)
- Gramercy
- Grand Isle
- Hahnville (unincorporated)
- Harahan
- Jean Lafitte
- Lafitte (unincorporated)
- Lutcher
- Montz (unincorporated)
- New Sarpy (unincorporated)
- Norco (unincorporated)
- Paradis (unincorporated)
- Poydras (unincorporated)
- Reserve (unincorporated)
- St. James (unincorporated)
- Saint Rose (unincorporated)
- Vacherie (unincorporated)
- Violet (unincorporated)
- Waggaman (unincorporated)
- Westwego

== Demographics ==
Historical populations - Greater New Orleans
Census	Pop.	Note	%±
1950	685,405		—
1960	868,480		26.7%
1970	1,045,809		20.4%
1980	1,187,073		13.5%
1990	1,238,816		4.4%
2000	1,337,726		8.0%
2010	1,189,166		−11.1%
2020	1,007,275		−15.3%
2025 (est.)	970,849		−3.6%
U.S. Decennial Census

The New Orleans metropolitan area was first defined in 1950. Then known as the New Orleans standard metropolitan area (New Orleans SMA), it consisted of three parishes—Orleans, Jefferson, and St. Bernard—and had a population of 685,405. Following a term change by the Bureau of the Budget (present-day U.S. Office of Management and Budget), the New Orleans SMA was called the New Orleans standard metropolitan statistical area (New Orleans SMSA). By the census of 1960, the population had grown to 868,480, a 27% increase over the previous census.

St. Tammany Parish was added to the New Orleans SMSA in 1963. The four-parish area had a combined population of 899,123 in 1960 and 1,045,809 in 1970. By the 1980 census, the population had increased by 14% to 1,187,073.

In 1983, the official name was changed to the New Orleans metropolitan statistical area (New Orleans MSA). Two more parishes, St. Charles and St. John the Baptist, were added to the metropolitan area the same year, making a six-parish MSA. The newly defined area had a total of 1,256,256 residents in 1980, but that number had declined to 1,238,816 in 1990.

The New Orleans MSA expanded to eight parishes in 1993 with the inclusion of Plaquemines and St. James. The eight-parish area had a combined population of 1,285,270 at the 1990 census and 1,337,726 in 2000.

The MSA was renamed the New Orleans–Metairie–Kenner metropolitan statistical area in 2003, and St. James Parish was removed. At the 2010 U.S. census, the metropolitan statistical area's population grew to 1,189,166. The overall racial composition of the New Orleans metropolitan area was as follows: White 58.2% (non-Hispanic white 52.4%), Black or African American 32.5%, American Indian 0.8%, Asian 3.5%, some other race 2.8%, two or more races 2.0%, and Hispanic or Latino (of any race) 8.6%. For those under 18, the majority are minority, with only 45.2% being non-Hispanic whites.

In 2013, St. James was once again included in the MSA, which at the same time was renamed to "New Orleans–Metairie". The 2019 U.S. census estimates determined the New Orleans metropolitan area's population stood at 1,270,530. In 2020, its population increased to 1,271,845. Of the metropolitan population, 485,267 households made up the area with an average of 2.6 persons per household. An estimated 50% of households were married couples, 7% had a male householder with no female present, 23% female with no male householder present, and 19% non-family households. Roughly 43% of the metropolitan population was married and 57% were unmarried. The Greater New Orleans unmarried population included 40% males and 36% females never married.

In 2019, there were 561,747 housing units and 63% were owner-occupied. Nearly 70% of the households were single unit households, 28% were multi-units and approximately 3% were mobile homes. The median value of owner-occupied housing units was $211,900, about 25% higher than the amount in Louisiana at the time ($172,100). At the 2019 estimates 47% of housing units were from under $100,000 to $100,000 to $200,000. The New Orleans metropolitan area gained 12.5% of move-ins since 2018.

As of 2020, Greater New Orleans had a racial makeup of 51% White Americans, 35% Blacks or African Americans, 3% Asians, 2% from two or more races, and 9% Hispanic or Latinos of any race. The area's median age was 39 and the population made up 52% females and 48% males. Almost 8% of the population were foreign-born with the majority of origins from Latin America and Asia. The predominant language spoken among the racial and ethnic makeup is English only, followed by Spanish. Greater New Orleans residents had an estimated per capita income of $31,889 and median household income of $55,710. Roughly 16.4% of the metropolis lived at or below the poverty line.

In 2023, St. Tammany was split off into its own metropolitan area, leaving the New Orleans MSA with seven parishes and tabulating an adjusted 2020 census population of 1,007,275.

Parish	Seat	2025 estimate	2020 census	Change	Land Area	Density
Jefferson	Gretna	431,398	440,781	−2.13%	296 sq mi (770 km^{2})	1,457/sq mi (563/km^{2})
Orleans	New Orleans	362,184	383,997	−5.68%	169 sq mi (440 km^{2})	2,143/sq mi (827/km^{2})
St. Charles	Hahnville	50,586	52,549	−3.74%	279 sq mi (720 km^{2})	181/sq mi (70/km^{2})
St. Bernard	Chalmette	45,642	43,764	+4.29%	378 sq mi (980 km^{2})	121/sq mi (47/km^{2})
St. John the Baptist	Edgard	39,875	42,477	−6.13%	213 sq mi (550 km^{2})	187/sq mi (72/km^{2})
Plaquemines	Pointe à la Hache	22,256	23,515	−5.35%	780 sq mi (2,000 km^{2})	29/sq mi (11/km^{2})
St. James	Convent	18,938	20,192	−6.21%	242 sq mi (630 km^{2})	78/sq mi (30/km^{2})
Total		970,849	1,007,275	−3.62%	2,357 sq mi (6,100 km^{2})	412/sq mi (159/km^{2})

== Combined statistical area ==
Location of the New Orleans–Metairie–Slidell CSA and its components: New Orleans–Metairie MSA Slidell–Mandeville–Covington MSA Bogalusa μSA Picayune μSA Louisiana Mississippi

The New Orleans–Metairie–Slidell combined statistical area (CSA) is made up of nine Louisiana parishes and one Mississippi county. The CSA includes two metropolitan areas and two micropolitan areas.

=== Components ===
- Metropolitan statistical areas (MSAs)
  - New Orleans–Metairie MSA: (Jefferson, Orleans, Plaquemines, St. Bernard, St. Charles, St. James, St. John the Baptist parishes).
  - Slidell–Mandeville–Covington MSA: (St. Tammany Parish)
- Micropolitan statistical areas (μSAs)
  - Bogalusa (Washington Parish)
  - Picayune (Pearl River County, Mississippi)

=== Demographics ===
At the 2019 American Community Survey, the combined statistical area had a population of 1,507,017. In 2022 following a redrawing of the former New Orleans–Metairie–Hammond combined statistical area, and the addition of a Slidell metropolitan area, it had a census-estimated population of 1,485,510.

In 2019, the racial and ethnic makeup of the combined statistical area was 54% White, 33% Black or African American, 3% Asian, 2% from two or more races, and 8% Hispanic or Latino of any race. As of 2022, its racial and ethnic composition was 52% White, 31% Black or African American, 2% Asian, 1% other race or ethnicity, 5% two or more races, and 9% Hispanic or Latino of any race.

In 2019, it had a median household income of $53,766 and per capita income of $30,533. There were 572,520 households and 667,185 housing units. The median value of an owner-occupied housing unit was $202,000 and 6.7% of CSA's population were foreign-born. Over 60% of the former New Orleans–Metairie–Hammond combined statistical area's foreign-born population were from Latin America as of 2019. In 2019, 17.3% of the CSA lived at or below the poverty line.

== Economy ==
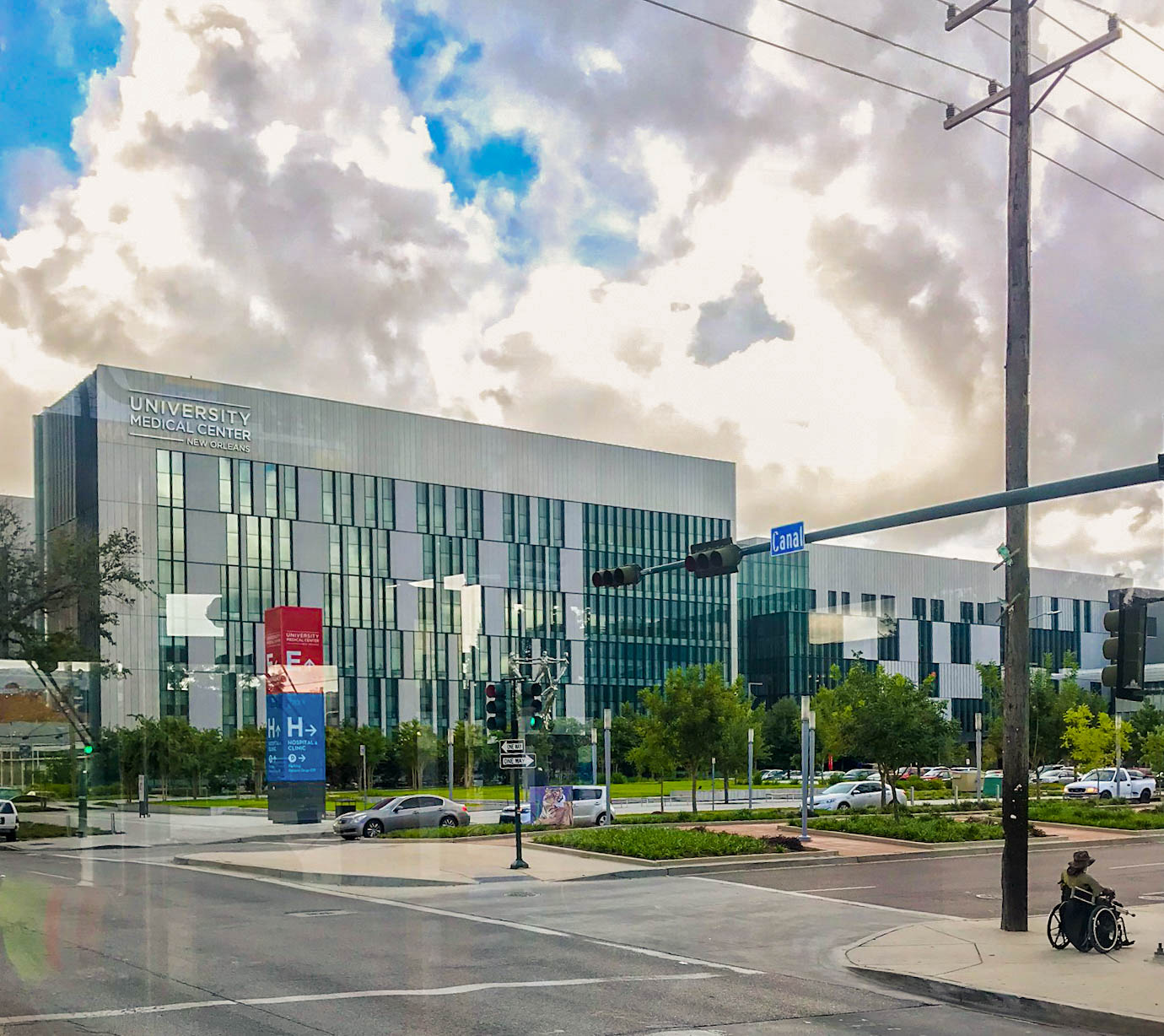
University Medical Center New Orleans

Greater New Orleans is home to one of the busiest ports in the world. Greater New Orleans' single Fortune 500 company is Entergy.

Other companies headquartered in the area include, Globalstar, Textron, Receivables Exchange, Tidewater Marine, and Intralox. Other companies with large operations in the New Orleans MSA include DXC Technology, Folgers, AT&T, and GE Capital to name a few.

The New Orleans area has 88% of the nation's oil rigs off its coast, and is in the top three in the country in oil and gas production. The metropolis boasts a civilian labor force of over 650,000 and there are over 65,000 students enrolled in the region's nine universities and eight community/technical colleges as well as thriving film, technology and healthcare industries. In 2018, New Orleans was documented for its growing technology sector.

Louis Armstrong New Orleans International Airport hosts 15 airlines, 54 nonstop flights, and connects to all U.S. hubs; a new, ground-up terminal opened November 6, 2019. The Port of New Orleans and the Mississippi River operates in the area with more than $296 million capital infrastructure investment for quick container turnaround and increased capacity.

Industrial projects, especially in St. James Parish, were estimated to help the New Orleans metro area add 4,600 jobs in 2018 and 7,600 in 2019, according to an annual economic forecast. The Greater New Orleans economy also benefits from expansions in the health care sector and the National World War II Museum, as well as airport construction. Formosa Petrochemicals' $9.4 billion complex in St. James Parish and Venture Global's $8.5 billion liquefied natural gas export facility at the Port of Plaquemines were planned yet Formosa's construction delayed due to the COVID-19 pandemic. A long-delayed $1.1 billion University Medical Center and the $1 billion Veterans Affairs Medical Center were constructed for the Greater New Orleans metropolitan region.

== Sports ==
Club	Sport	League	Venue (capacity)	Founded	Titles	Record attendance
New Orleans Saints	American football	NFL	Caesars Superdome (73,208)	1967	1	73,373
New Orleans Pelicans	Basketball	NBA	Smoothie King Center (16,867)	2002	0	18,444
New Orleans Jesters	Soccer	NPSL	Pan American Stadium (5,000)	2003	0	5,000
New Orleans Gold	Rugby union	MLR	Gold Mine (10,000)	2017	0	1,900

== Media ==
=== Television ===
HDTV channels are in green.

PSIP Channel	Call Sign	Network	Digital subchannels	Owner
4.1	WWL	CBS	4.2 True Crime Network, 4.3 Catchy Comedy, 4.4 Twist, 4.5 getTV, 4.7 QVC2, 4.8 Shop LC	Tegna, Inc.
6.1	WDSU	NBC	6.2 MeTV, 6.4 Story Television, 6.5 theGrio, 6.6 QVC	Hearst Television
8.1	WVUE	Fox	8.2 Bounce TV, 8.3 Circle, 8.4 Ion Mystery, 8.5 Oxygen, 8.6 Start TV	Gray Television
12.1	WYES	PBS	12.2 World, 12.3 Create, 12.4 PBS Kids	Greater New Orleans Educational Television Foundation
20.1	WHNO	CTN	20.2 CTN Lifestyle, 20.3 CTNi	Christian Television Network
22	WTNO-CD†	Azteca América	N/A	HC2 Holdings
26.1	WGNO	ABC	26.2 Antenna TV, 26.3 Rewind TV, 26.4 TBD	Nexstar Media Group
28.1	KNLD	Daystar		Daystar Television Network
30.1	KFOL-CD	Independent		Folse Communications, LLC
32.1	WLAE	Public Independent	32.2 MHz Worldview, 32.3 CatholicTV, 32.4 V-me	Educational Broadcasting Foundation
38.1	WNOL	CW	38.2 Court TV, 38.3 Comet, 38.4 Charge!	Nexstar Media Group
41.1	KNOV	Independent		Beach TV Properties, Inc
42.1	KGLA	Telemundo	42.2 Laff, 42.3 Cozi, 42.4 WLFT Live Festival TV	Mayavision, Inc
47.1	K20MM-D	HSN	47.2 QVC, 47.3 HSN2, 47.4 QVC2, 47.5 QVC3, 47.6 Dabl, 47.7 QVC Kitchen	Home Shopping Network
49.1	WPXL	Ion	49.2 Grit, 49.3 Laff, 49.4 Jewelry, 49.5 Scripps News, 49.6 HSN, 49.7 QVC, 49.8 HSN2	ION Media Networks, Inc.
54.1	WUPL	My Network TV	54.2 Quest, 54.3 Heroes & Icons, 54.4 Defy TV, 54.5 This TV	Tegna, Inc.

†Indicates analog low power station

=== Radio ===
==== AM radio ====
Frequency (kHz)	Call Sign	Format	Affiliations	Owner
600	WVOG	Gospel music		F.W. Robbert Broadcasting
690	WQNO	News/Sports talk	Fox Sports Radio	WTIX Inc.
750	KKNO	Gospel music		Robert C. Blakes Enterprises, Inc.
800	WSHO	Christian radio and Music	Salem Communications	Shadowlands Communications, LLC
830	KGLA	Spanish Contemporary	AP and CNN	Sunburst Media
870	WWL	News/Talk/Sports	CBS and New Orleans Saints Radio Network	Audacy, Inc.
940	WYLD	Urban gospel		Clear Channel Communications
990	WGSO	News/Talk/Sports		North Shore Radio, LLC
1010	WCKW	Gospel and Christian radio		Covenant Network
1060	WLNO	Christian Radio		Communicom Company of Louisiana, LP
1230	WBOK	Gospel Music	ABC 26 News	Bakewell Media of Louisiana, LLC
1280	WODT	All News	Black Information Network	iHeart Radio
1320	WRJW	Country/Christian/Gospel	Citadel Media and Jones Radio Networks	Pearl River Communications, Inc.
1350	WWWL	Sports/Talk	ESPN Radio	Audacy, Inc.
1540	WFNO	Spanish Tropical	Telemundo and KGLA TV	Crocodile Broadcasting
1560	WSLA	Sports Talk		Mapa Broadcasting

==== FM radio ====
Frequency (MHz)	Call Sign	Format	Affiliations	Owner
88.3	WRBH	Radio for the blind and handicapped		Radio For The Blind & Handicapped, Inc.
89.1	WBSN	Contemporary Christian music		Providence Educational Foundation
89.9	WWNO	Public/Classical, Fine Arts, Jazz, & Talk	NPR	University of New Orleans
90.7	WWOZ	Jazz, Blues, New Orleans community music		New Orleans Jazz & Heritage Foundation
91.1	WRNV	Spanish Christian radio	Radio Nueva Vida	Educational Media Foundation
91.5	WTUL	Progressive Radio		Tulane University
92.3	WZRH	Alternative		Cumulus Media
93.3	WQUE	Mainstream Urban		iHeartMedia
94.3	WTIX	Oldies		Fleur de Lis Broadcasting
94.9	WGUO	Classic Country		Dowdy Broadcasting
95.7	WKBU	Classic rock		Audacy, Inc.
97.1	WEZB	Top 40		Audacy, Inc.
98.5	WYLD	Urban Adult Contemporary		iHeartMedia
98.9	WUUU	Country music		Pittman Broadcasting Services, LLC
99.5	WRNO	Talk Radio	Fox News and Premiere Radio Networks	iHeartMedia
100.3	KLRZ	Sports		Coastal Broadcasting of Larose LLC
101.1	WNOE	Country		iHeartMedia
101.9	WLMG	Adult Contemporary		Audacy, Inc.
102.3	WHIV-LP	Community radio		Nonprofit board
102.9	KMEZ	Urban AC		Cumulus Media
104.1	KVDU	Adult Hits		iHeartMedia
104.5	KWMZ-FM	'80s		M.A.C. Broadcasting, LLC
105.3	WWL	News/Talk/Sports	CBS and New Orleans Saints Radio Network	Audacy, Inc.
106.1	WRKN	Country		Cumulus Media
106.7	KKND	Urban gospel		Cumulus Media
107.5	KNOL	K-Love		E.M.F., LLC

==== Internet radio ====
Station	Format	Affiliations	Owner
Crescent City Radio	College		Loyola University New Orleans

== Infrastructure ==
=== Transportation ===
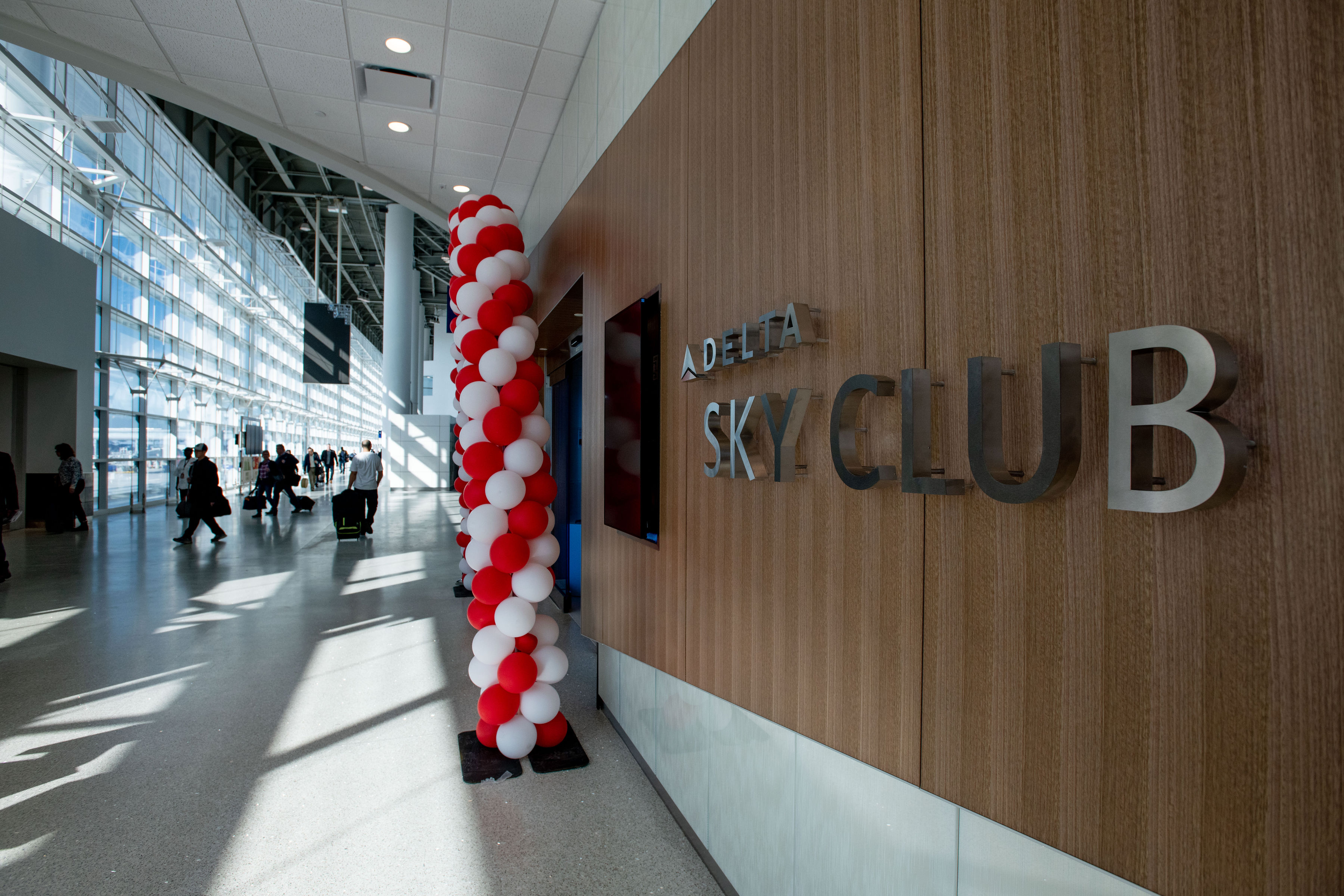
Delta SkyClub at Louis Armstrong New Orleans International Airport

Louis Armstrong New Orleans International Airport is located to the west of downtown, in the city of Kenner. As of 2023, the airport is currently served by fifteen airlines. Domestic nonstop service is provided to Akron, Atlanta, Austin, Baltimore, Bentonville, Boston, Charleston, Charlotte, Chicago (O'Hare and Midway), Cincinnati, Columbus, Dallas (DFW and Love Field), Denver, Detroit, Ft. Lauderdale, Ft. Myers, Hartford, Houston (Bush Intercontinental and Hobby), Jacksonville, Kansas City, Las Vegas, Long Beach, Louisville, Los Angeles, Miami, Minneapolis, Nashville, New York (JFK, LaGuardia, and Newark), Norfolk, Orlando (Orlando International and Sanford), Philadelphia, Pittsburgh, Phoenix, Raleigh, Richmond, Salt Lake City, San Antonio, San Diego, San Francisco, Savannah, Seattle, St. Louis, Tampa, Tulsa, and Washington DC (Reagan National and Dulles). International nonstop service is provided to Cancun, London, Montreal, San Pedro Sula, and Toronto.

Major highways in the area include Interstate 10, Interstate 12, Interstate 610, Interstate 310, Interstate 510, Interstate 55, and Interstate 59, as well as U.S. Highway 90 and U.S. Highway 61. The Lake Pontchartrain Causeway, a 24-mile (39 km) span that is the world's longest bridge over water, connects Metairie (on the south shore) to Mandeville on the North Shore. Should metropolitan New Orleans appear to be threatened by a severe hurricane, the Louisiana State Police are prepared to enact a contraflow lane reversal program in order to evacuate the metropolitan area as quickly as possible.

Metropolitan New Orleans is served by six of the seven Class 1 freight railroads operating in North America. Passenger train service is provided by Amtrak on the Crescent, City of New Orleans, and Sunset Limited routes.

The Port of New Orleans is the 3rd-largest port in the United States, as measured by total bulk tonnage exported. According to the same source, the adjoining Port of South Louisiana is the largest port in the United States when measured by the same factor.

=== Flood control ===
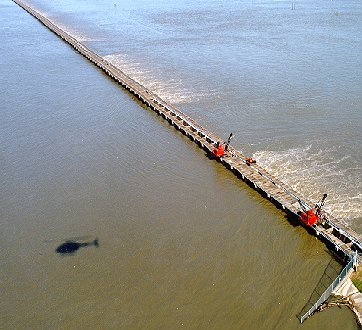
Opening of the Bonnet Carré Spillway on 1997-03-17. The spillway was operational from March 17 to April 18, 1997 – operating at a maximum flow of 243,000 cu ft/s (6,900 m^{3}/s).

The U.S. Army Corps of Engineers is responsible for the design and construction of Greater New Orleans' flood protection system. In 2007, Louisiana voters created a new Southeast Louisiana Flood Protection Authority (SLFPA) to coordinate with the Corps of Engineers regarding flood protection issues.

- Bonnet Carré Spillway
- Mississippi Valley Division of the United States Army Corps of Engineers

== See also ==
- New Orleans English
- List of metropolitan areas of Louisiana
- Intrastate regions
- Effects of Hurricane Katrina in New Orleans and Reconstruction of New Orleans
- Louisiana census statistical areas
- List of cities, towns, and villages in Louisiana
- List of census-designated places in Louisiana
