= Mass media in Shreveport, Louisiana =

This is a list of television, radio and print media operations in Shreveport, Louisiana.

== Television ==
Channel	Callsign	Affiliation	Subchannels		Owner
(Virtual/RF)	Callsign	Affiliation	Channel	Programming	Owner
3.1 (28)	KTBS-TV	ABC	3.2; 3.3	The Local AccuWeather Channel; KTBS 24 Hour News	KTBS, Inc. (Wray Family)
6.1 (15)	KTAL-TV	NBC			Nexstar Media Group
12.1 (23)	KSLA	CBS	12.2; 12.3	Circle; Bounce TV	Gray Television
21.1 (21)	KPXJ	The CW	21.2	Me-TV	KTBS, Inc.
24.1 (24)	KLTS-TV	PBS	24.2; 24.3	PBS Kids; Create	Louisiana Public Broadcasting
33.1 (34)	KMSS-TV	Fox			Marshall Broadcasting Group (operated by Nexstar Media Group)
40	KADO-CD	Religious Ind.			Word of Life Ministries
42	K27NA-D	3ABN			Edge Spectrum, Inc.
45.1 (44)	KSHV-TV	MyNetworkTV			Nexstar Media Group
54	K54CB	Ind.			
59	W59GO	TBN			Trinity Broadcasting Network

Notes:

- KPXJ was the first station in the U.S. to convert its broadcast signal to digital-only in September 2005..
- In 2004, KPXJ became a UPN affiliate. It was originally an affiliate of PAX (now known as Ion). Shreveport is now one of a few markets which the Ion network does not have an affiliate station. Ion's national feed can be seen on Cox Communications in Bossier City and on Comcast in Shreveport.
- Previously, UPN was broadcast on KSHV, sharing an affiliation with The WB network. UPN programming aired from 9 to 11 p.m. Syndicated programming currently airs at that time on channel 45.
- KTBS broadcasts newscasts for KPXJ on Monday through Friday mornings at 7 a.m. and nightly at 9 p.m. Before becoming a UPN affiliate in 2004, KPXJ aired rebroadcasts of KTBS 3 News daily at 5:30 p.m. (rebroadcast of the 5 p.m. newscast) and 11 p.m. (rebroadcast of the 10 p.m. newscast).

== Radio ==
AM stations

Frequency	Callsign	Nickname	Format	Owner
710	KEEL		News/Talk	Townsquare Media
950	KRRP	Praise 950	Gospel Music	Maria Hobbs, Administratrix of Estate of Frank Van Dyke Hobb, Southeast Ark-La-Tex
980	KOKA		Black Gospel	Alpha Media
1070	KBCL		Contemporary Christian	Barnabus Center Ministries
1130	KWKH	1130 The Tiger	Sports/Talk	Townsquare Media
1240	KASO		Classic Hits	Greenwood Acres Baptist Church
1300	KSYB		Black Gospel	Amistad Radio Group
1320	KNCB	ESPN Shreveport	Sports	Vivian
1460	KTKC (AM)	Red de Radio Amistad	Spanish Christian	Houston Christian Broadcasters, Inc.
1480	KIOU		Black Gospel	Wilkins Communications
1590	KGAS		Southern Gospel	Hanszen Broadcasting Group

FM stations

Frequency	Callsign	Nickname	Format	Owner
89.9	KDAQ		Classical	Red River Radio
91.3	KSCL		College Rock/Various Genres	Centenary College
92.1	KVFZ	92.1 The Fish|Christian A/C		
92.1	KVCL		Country	Baldridge-Dumas Communications, Southeast Ark-La-Tex
92.9	KSPH	True Country	Classic country	Houston Christian Broadcasters, Inc.
93.7	KXKS-FM	Kiss Country 93-7	Country	Townsquare Media
94.5	KRUF	K94.5	Top 40	Townsquare Media
95.7	KLKL	The River 95.7	Oldies	Alpha Media
96.5	KVKI	96-5 KVKI	Adult Contemporary	Townsquare Media
97.3	KQHN	Q97.3	Hot Adult Contemporary	Cumulus Media
97.5	KDBH-FM	Country Legends 97.5	Classic country	Baldridge-Dumas Communications, Southeast Ark-La-Tex
98.1	KTAL	98 Rocks	Classic Rock	
98.9	KTUX	Highway 98.9	Classic rock	Townsquare Media
99.7	KMJJ	The Big Station 99.7 KMJJ	Urban Contemporary	Cumulus Media
99.9	KTEZ	Easy 99.9	Adult Contemporary	Baldridge-Dumas Communications, Southeast Ark-La-Tex
100.7	KZBL	Good Time Oldies	Oldies	Baldridge-Dumas Communications, Southeast Ark-La-Tex
101.1	KRMD	101.1 KRMD	Country	Cumulus Media
102.1	KDKS	Hot 102 Jamz	Urban Adult Contemporary	Alpha Media
102.9	KVMA-FM	Magic 102.9	Urban Adult Contemporary	Cumulus Media
103.7	KBTT	103.7 Tha Beat	Mainstream Urban	Alpha Media
104.7	KHMD		Country	Mansfield
105.3	KNCB-FM	Hot Country 105.3	Country	Vivian
106.5	KLNQ	K-Love	Contemporary Christian	EMF Broadcasting, Southeast Ark-La-Tex
106.7	KYXA	K-Love	Contemporary Christian	EMF Broadcasting
107.1	KWLV		Country	Baldridge-Dumas Communications, Southeast Ark-La-Tex

== Former stations ==
Frequency	Callsign	Nickname	Format	Owner	Last air date
1340/100.7	KRMD/K264AS	Lite Rock 100.7	Soft Adult Contemporary	Cumulus Media	March 14, 2025
1450/95.9	KNOC/K240EY	95.9 The Bounce	Rhythmic Throwbacks (Playing urban adult contemporary in daytime and mainstream urban in nighttime)	North Face Broadcasting, Natchitoches	January 26, 2026
94.9-1	KSBH-HD1	94.9 The River	Country	ksbh, llc., Natchitoches	January 26, 2026
94.9-2/92.3	KSBH-HD2/K222AO	92.3 The Fox	Classic hits (Playing christmas music between November and December)	ksbh, llc., Natchitoches	January 26, 2026

== Newspapers ==
The major daily newspaper serving the Shreveport-Bossier and Ark-La-Tex area is The Shreveport Times. Its headquarters are located in downtown Shreveport.

Other smaller non-daily newspapers

- Caddo Citizen
- Daily Legal News
- Shreveport Sun
- The Inquisitor

Bossier City is served by the daily Bossier Press-Tribune.

The Bombardier is the weekly newspaper of record for the Barksdale Air Force Base.

Alternative publications

- The Best of Times
- The Christian Times
- City Lights
- SB Magazine

Specialty publications

- American Classifieds / Thrifty Nickel
- LA Health
- LA Parenting
- Make & Model
- Move On In
- Real Estate Book

== See also ==
- Louisiana media
  - List of newspapers in Louisiana
  - List of radio stations in Louisiana
  - List of television stations in Louisiana
  - Media of locales in Louisiana: Baton Rouge, Lafayette, Monroe, New Orleans, Terrebonne Parish
