= KBYO =

KBYO may refer to:

- KBYO-FM, a radio station (92.7 FM) licensed to Farmerville, Louisiana, United States
- KBYO (AM), a defunct radio station (1360 AM) formerly licensed to Tallulah, Louisiana
