= KDLA =

KDLA may refer to:

- KDLA (FM), a radio station (98.3 FM) licensed to serve New Llano, Louisiana, United States
- KDLA (AM), a defunct radio station (1010 AM) formerly licensed to serve De Ridder, Louisiana
