= WETH =

WETH may refer to:

- WETH (FM), a radio station (94.3 FM) licensed to serve Harrisonburg, Louisiana, United States; see List of radio stations in Louisiana
- WGMS (FM), a radio station (89.1 FM) licensed to serve Hagerstown, Maryland, United States, which held the call sign WETH from 1992 to 2007
