= WNLS =

WNLS may refer to:

- WNLS (FM), a radio station (91.3 FM) licensed to serve Slidell, Louisiana, United States
- WTLY, a radio station (1270 AM) licensed to serve Tallahassee, Florida, United States, which held the call sign WNLS from 1990 to 2015
