= KZLU =

KZLU may refer to:

- KZLU-LP, a defunct radio station (102.1 FM) formerly licensed to serve Baton Rouge, Louisiana, United States
- KYUA, a radio station (88.5 FM) licensed to serve Inyokern, California, United States, which held the call sign KZLU from 2005 to 2016
