= KZJM-LP =

Urban contemporary radio station in Lafayette, Louisiana

KZJM
- Lafayette, Louisiana; United States
- Frequency: 92.7 MHz

Programming
- Format: Urban Contemporary

Ownership
- Owner: M&M Community Development; (M&M Community Development (Lafayette Branch))
- Sister stations: KCJM-LP

History
- First air date: June 8, 2005

Technical information
- Licensing authority: FCC
- ERP: 100 watts
- Transmitter coordinates: 30°13′55″N 91°59′20″W

Links
- Public license information: Public file; LMS
- Website: 927kzjm.org

KZJM-LP (92.7 FM) is an American low-power FM radio station broadcasting to the Lafayette, Louisiana, area. The station airs an urban contemporary music format.
