= The Best of Times (Shreveport) =

The Best of Times News is a monthly news-magazine published in Shreveport, Louisiana, US for adults over 50 years of age in Northwest Louisiana, founded in 1993. Its mission statement is to "Celebrate Age and Maturity". It has 50,000 readers.
