= KOCZ-LP =

FM radio station in Opelousas, Louisiana, US

- Opelousas, Louisiana; United States
- Broadcast area: St. Landry Parish, Louisiana
- Frequency: 94.9 (MHz)
- Branding: Opelousas Community Radio

Programming
- Format: Variety/Community Radio

Ownership
- Owner: Southern Development Foundation
- Sister stations: KIEE

History
- First air date: June 20, 2003
- Former frequencies: 103.7 MHz (2003–2019)

Technical information
- Licensing authority: FCC
- Class: L1
- ERP: 72 watts
- HAAT: 35 meters (115 feet)
- Transmitter coordinates: 30.53894°N 92.07891°W

Links
- Public license information: LMS

KOCZ-LP is a non-commercial low-power FM community radio station in Opelousas, Louisiana, United States. The station operates at a frequency of 94.9 MHz and features a mix of cajun, rhythm and blues, hip-hop, gospel and local public affairs, with a focus on the area's African-American community.

KOCZ is licensed to the Southern Development Foundation, a civil rights group that provides funding and technical support to selected cooperatives and community organizations. The foundation operates a full-power (25,000 watts) FM station in nearby Lafayette, Louisiana, KIEE 88.3 FM.

== History ==
KOCZ-LP, which was started as part of the third community radio "barnraising" initiative of the Prometheus Radio Project, went on the air on June 20, 2003. The station originally broadcast at 103.7 FM and received FCC approval for it current frequency, 94.9, in 2019.

== Recognition ==
KOCZ has garnered national attention for the role it plays in the Opelousas community. It was the subject of a New York Times article in 2011 and was cited by FCC Commissioner Jessica Rosenworcel in 2013 as an example of the unique local service low-power FM stations provide in top 50 radio markets.

== See also ==
- List of community radio stations in the United States
