= KKAY =

KKAY and KBRS

KKAY: White Castle, Louisiana; KBRS: Belle Rose, Louisiana; United States
- Broadcast area: Baton Rouge area
- Frequencies: KKAY: 1590 kHz; KBRS: 106.9 MHz

Programming
- Format: Christian and urban gospel

Ownership
- Owner: KKAY: Liberty in Christ Jesus Ministry; KBRS: Alex Media, Inc.

History
- First air date: KKAY: November 1976; KBRS: January 2013
- Call sign meaning: KBRS: Belle Rose

Technical information
- Licensing authority: FCC
- Facility ID: KKAY: 36232; KBRS: 190402
- Class: KKAY: D; KBRS: A
- Power: KKAY: 1,000 watts (day); 67 watts (night)
- ERP: KBRS: 6,000 watts
- HAAT: KBRS: 86 meters (282 ft)
- Transmitter coordinates: KKAY: 30°11′1″N 91°6′27″W; KBRS: 30°07′36″N 91°12′56″W

Links
- Public license information: KKAY: Public file; LMS; KBRS: Public file; LMS
- Webcast: Listen live
- Website: kkay1590.com

KKAY (1590 AM) and KBRS (106.9 FM) are two commercial radio stations in Louisiana. KKAY is licensed to White Castle, Louisiana, and is owned by Liberty in Christ Jesus Ministry. KBRS is licensed to Belle Rose, Louisiana, and is owned by Alex Media, Inc. Both stations simulcast their programming, directed at the region of Louisiana between Baton Rouge and New Orleans.

The stations' studios are on Railroad Avenue in Donaldsonville, Louisiana. KBRS's transmitter is off Ridge Road in White Castle. KKAY's transmitter is in a different part of White Castle, off Route 405.

== Programming ==
KKAY and KBRS broadcast a blend of urban gospel music and classic old time favorites, as well as airing Christian talk and teaching programs. Religious leaders pay KKAY and KBRS for their time on the stations, and may seek donations on the air for their ministries.

KKAY and KBRS carry sports from several historically black colleges and universities. KKAY and KBRS also cover local high school sports and are the only radio stations in the Gulf South that carry girls high school softball.

== History ==
KKAY first signed on the air in November 1976. KBRS first signed on the air in January 2013.
