= White Castle, Louisiana =

- Town
- Location of White Castle in Iberville Parish, Louisiana

- Location in Louisiana Location in the United States
- Coordinates: 30°09′40″N 91°08′58″W
- Country: United States
- State: Louisiana
- Parish: Iberville

Area
  - Total: 0.74 sq mi (1.91 km^{2})
  - Land: 0.73 sq mi (1.90 km^{2})
  - Water: 0.0039 sq mi (0.01 km^{2})
- Elevation: 20 ft (6.1 m)

Population (2020)
  - Total: 1,722
  - Density: 2,349.7/sq mi (907.21/km^{2})
- Time zone: UTC-6 (CST)
  - Summer (DST): UTC-5 (CDT)
- ZIP code: 70788
- Area code: 225
- FIPS code: 22-81375
- GNIS feature ID: 2406876
- Website: whitecastle.us

White Castle is a town in Iberville Parish, Louisiana, United States. At the 2010 U.S. census the town population was 1,883, and 1,640 at the 2020 population estimates program. It is part of the Baton Rouge metropolitan area.

== History ==
The town of White Castle was carved out of the George Wailes plantation "White Castle". The 1883 Charles H. Dickinson Survey of several parishes of Louisiana shows the White Castle Plantation property. Nottoway Plantation, a prominent antebellum mansion, was located nearby.

White Castle was established as a town in the 1880s with the influx of people and business brought by the logging industry in the cypress swamps of the area. When the cypress wood was depleted, the main economic activity reverted to the sugar cane industry which had been established in the latter part of the 18th century.

Individual plantation sugar mills gave way to larger mills servicing many plantations. By 1970, White Castle had three major sugar mills, Cora Texas, Cedar Grove, and Catherine/Supples. Only one, Cora Texas located just south of White Castle on LA 1, is still in operation. Antebellum plantation homes in the area are Nottoway, Tally-ho, among others.

People living in the unincorporated areas of Samstown, Lone Star, Belle Grove, Dorseyville, and as far away as Bayou Goula helped support White Castle businesses through the years. At one time, there were three car dealerships, Dufour Chevrolet, White Castle Motor company (Ford), and Dixie Sales and Service(Chrysler/Plymouth); three drug stores, Hebert's, Viallon's, and Bajon's; Weils and Shaheens clothing stores; Agosta Shoe Store; Eskine's Jewelry; and two lumber yards, Baudoin's and Tassin's. Engolio's Maggio's, Chiaramonte, Dominic Sciortino, Tina's, Forte's, and Landry's were used for grocery shopping. Big-screen entertainment was provided by Castle Theater until 1959, when it was closed.

During the 1950s, the chemical industry entered the area, congregating around the Mississippi River between Baton Rouge and New Orleans. This industry brought economic growth which took White Castle into the 1980s. Companies establishing chemical plants in the area near White Castle were Dow Chemical north of Plaquemine, Georgia-Gulf and Hercules north of White Castle, and Ciba-Geigy on the east bank of the Mississippi.

Population levels have remained between 1,900 and 2,200 for the last forty years, within the White Castle town limits. The surrounding unincorporated areas have seen an increase in population.

== Geography ==
White Castle is located in southeastern Iberville Parish on the south bank of the Mississippi River. Louisiana Highway 1 passes through the town, leading northwest 10 miles (16 km) to Plaquemine, the Iberville Parish seat and southeast the same distance to Donaldsonville, the seat of Ascension Parish.

According to the United States Census Bureau, the town of White Castle has a total area of 0.73 square miles (1.9 km^{2}), of which 1.9 acres (7,876 m^{2}), or 0.41%, are water.

== Demographics ==
Historical population
Census	Pop.	Note	%±
1890	603		—
1900	1,850		206.8%
1910	2,289		23.7%
1920	1,566		−31.6%
1930	1,499		−4.3%
1940	1,692		12.9%
1950	1,839		8.7%
1960	2,253		22.5%
1970	2,206		−2.1%
1980	2,160		−2.1%
1990	2,102		−2.7%
2000	1,946		−7.4%
2010	1,883		−3.2%
2020	1,722		−8.6%
2025 (est.)	1,585	▼	−8.0%
U.S. Decennial Census

White Castle racial composition as of 2020
Race	Number	Percentage
White (non-Hispanic)	125	7.26%
Black or African American (non-Hispanic)	1,553	90.19%
Native American	2	0.12%
Other/Mixed	29	1.68%
Hispanic or Latino	13	0.75%

As of the 2020 United States census, there were 1,722 people, 672 households, and 421 families residing in the town. The racial and ethnic makeup of the town was 83.4% Black and African American, 14.2% non-Hispanic white, and 2.3% two or more races at the 2019 American Community Survey. The median household income was $30,729 and 27.3% of the population lived at or below the poverty line.

At the 2000 United States census, there were 1,946 people, 699 households, and 513 families residing in the town. The population density was 2,592.0 inhabitants per square mile (1,000.8/km^{2}). There were 762 housing units at an average density of 1,014.9 per square mile (391.9/km^{2}). The racial makeup of the town was 76.82% African American, 22.56% White, 0.21% Asian, 0.10% from other races, and 0.31% from two or more races. Hispanic or Latino of any race were 1.44% of the population.

There were 699 households, out of which 38.3% had children under the age of 18 living with them, 36.6% were married couples living together, 30.8% had a female householder with no husband present, and 26.6% were non-families. 24.7% of all households were made up of individuals, and 12.4% had someone living alone who was 65 years of age or older. The average household size was 2.78 and the average family size was 3.34.

In the town, the population was spread out, with 31.7% under the age of 18, 10.2% from 18 to 24, 26.0% from 25 to 44, 18.2% from 45 to 64, and 13.9% who were 65 years of age or older. The median age was 32 years. For every 100 females, there were 82.2 males. For every 100 females age 18 and over, there were 75.3 males.

The median income for a household in the town was $19,435, and the median income for a family was $24,236. Males had a median income of $25,170 versus $15,885 for females. The per capita income for the town was $12,246. About 25.4% of families and 31.3% of the population were below the poverty line, including 43.0% of those under age 18 and 18.8% of those age 65 or over.

== Notable people ==
- Kate Walker Behan (1851-1918), club leader and philanthropist
- Ronald Martin, American football safety

== Radio stations ==
- KKAY
- WBSN-FM
