= KJMG =

Coordinates: 32.672°N 91.918°W

- Bastrop, Louisiana; United States
- Broadcast area: Monroe-West Monroe
- Frequency: 97.3 MHz (HD Radio)
- Branding: 97.3 Wink FM

Programming
- Language: English
- Format: Hot adult contemporary

Ownership
- Owner: Todd Fowler; (Skyline Media, LLC)

History
- First air date: 1977

Technical information
- Licensing authority: FCC
- Facility ID: 15095
- Class: A
- ERP: 5,900 watts
- HAAT: 100 meters (330 ft)

Links
- Public license information: Public file; LMS
- Website: 973winkfm.com

KJMG (97.3 FM, "97.3 Wink FM") is an American radio station licensed to Bastrop, Louisiana. The station airs a Hot adult contemporary radio format in the greater Monroe, Louisiana area. KJMG is owned by Todd Fowler, through licensee Skyline Media, LLC. The studios are located in Monroe, and its transmitter is located east of Sterlington, Louisiana.

== History ==
KJMG Majic 97 (97.3 FM) is urban adult contemporary. KJMG had leaned more heavily on Throwback Hip Hop and R&B from the '90s and early 2000s.

On November 20, 2025 KJMG dropped its urban adult contemporary format and began stunting with Christmas music, branded as "97.3 Wink FM", with a new format to launch after the holidays.

== See also ==
- List of radio stations in Louisiana
