= KPCP =

New Roads, Louisiana; United States
- Frequency: 88.3 MHz
- Branding: "KPCP 88.3 FM"

Programming
- Format: Defunct (was Variety)

Ownership
- Owner: Stop the Violence/Save the Children, Inc.

History
- Last air date: February 2020
- Call sign meaning: Pointe Coupee Parish

Technical information
- Licensing authority: FCC
- Facility ID: 169910
- Class: C3
- ERP: 10,500 watts
- HAAT: 91 metres (299 ft)
- Transmitter coordinates: 30°43′20.40″N 91°35′45.60″W

Links
- Public license information: Public file; LMS

KPCP (88.3 FM) was a radio station licensed to serve the community of New Roads, Louisiana. The station was last owned by Stop the Violence/Save the Children, Inc., and aired a variety format.

The station was assigned the KPCP call letters by the Federal Communications Commission on December 27, 2007.

KPCP's license was cancelled by the FCC on April 12, 2022, due to the station having been silent for more than 12 months.
