= WSLA =

- Slidell, Louisiana; United States
- Broadcast area: New Orleans metropolitan area
- Frequency: 1560 kHz
- Branding: WSLA AM 1560

Programming
- Format: News/Talk, Sports

Ownership
- Owner: Mapa Broadcasting

History
- First air date: September 5, 1963 (as WBGS)
- Former call signs: WBGS (1963–1972), WSDL (1972–1989)
- Call sign meaning: Slidell, LouisiAna

Technical information
- Licensing authority: FCC
- Facility ID: 39849
- Class: D
- Power: 1,000 watts (days only)
- Transmitter coordinates: 30°15′00″N 89°45′46″W
- Translator: 93.9 W230CR (Slidell)

Links
- Public license information: Public file; LMS
- Webcast: Listen live
- Website: wslaradio.com

WSLA (1560 AM) is a news, talk, and sports radio station licensed to Slidell, Louisiana. Owned by Mapa Broadcasting, the station serves the New Orleans metropolitan area, focusing on St. Tammany Parish. The WSLA studios and transmitter are located in Slidell. Besides a standard analog transmission, WSLA is simulcast on low-power translator W230CR (93.9 FM) and is available online.

== History ==
The station signed on the air as WBGS on December 3, 1963, founded by George Mayoral, a New Orleans radio and television pioneer and member of the NAB Hall Of Fame, and owned by Bill Garrett, a Slidell Chevrolet dealer. The station's studios were originally housed on the showroom floor of the Chevrolet dealership on Pontchartrain Drive.

Later becoming WSDL, the station was sold in the 1980s and became WSLA on February 27, 1989. It was repossessed by the Mayoral family in 1993 and was off the air for a time. WSLA has been through various talk, music and sports formats, and remains one of the last independent stations in the New Orleans region, completely owned by New Orleans–based MAPA Broadcasting.

WSLA is a primary outlet for high school football in the Slidell/St. Tammany Parish area, and in recent years has been the New Orleans outlet for the Houston Astros Radio Network. The station experienced flooding and some roof damage during Hurricane Katrina, taking several months to fully restore all facilities.
