= WWNO =

Public radio station in New Orleans

Coordinates: 29.920°N 90.025°W

WWNO and KTLN
WWNO: New Orleans, Louisiana; KTLN: Thibodaux, Louisiana; United States
- Broadcast area: WWNO: New Orleans metropolitan area; KTLN: Houma/Thibodaux
- Frequencies: WWNO: 89.9 MHz (HD Radio); KTLN: 90.5 MHz
- Branding: 89.9 WWNO - New Orleans Public Radio

Programming
- Format: WWNO: Public radio news and information/talk; KTLN: Classical
- Subchannels: WWNO: HD2: Classical 104.9 (classical); HD3: Jazz
- Affiliations: NPR; BBC World Service

Ownership
- Owner: University of New Orleans

History
- First air date: WWNO: February 20, 1972; KTLN: 1995
- Call sign meaning: WWNO: New Orleans; KTLN: Thibodaux, Louisiana (the station's city of license)

Technical information
- Licensing authority: FCC
- Facility ID: WWNO: 38607; KTLN: 4219
- Class: WWNO: C1; KTLN: A
- ERP: WWNO: 35,000 watts; KTLN: 200 watts
- HAAT: WWNO: 299.8 meters (984 ft); KTLN: 109 meters (358 ft)
- Translator(s): HD2: 104.9 K285FF (Metairie)

Links
- Public license information: WWNO: Public file; LMS; KTLN: Public file; LMS
- Webcast: Listen live
- Website: www.wwno.org

WWNO (89.9 FM) is a public, non-commercial radio station in New Orleans, Louisiana. It is owned by the University of New Orleans, offering a news and information radio format with some jazz programs on weekends. Studios and offices are located on the fourth floor of the Earl K. Long Library on the campus of the University of New Orleans on Lakeshore Drive in the Lake Pontchartrain side of New Orleans. The transmitter is off Behrman Highway in the Algiers neighborhood of the city.

WWNO also operates a 24-hour classical music service, "Classical 104.9 FM", on 250 watt FM translator K285FF in Metarie and simulcast in Thibodaux, Louisiana, on KTLN at 90.5 MHz, one of the few dedicated classical stations in the South. WWNO broadcasts in the HD Radio hybrid format. Its HD2 subchannel carries "Classical 104.9 FM". The HD3 subchannel plays jazz music.

== Programming ==
WWNO's weekday schedule has several programs from National Public Radio including All Things Considered, Morning Edition, Here & Now and Fresh Air with Terry Gross. Weekend NPR shows include Wait Wait... Don't Tell Me!, This American Life, American Routes and On The Media. Local WWNO programming includes The Reading Life, Out To Lunch, Continuum, Louisiana Eats, and Sea Change. The BBC World Service is heard overnight Sunday through Thursday (Monday through Friday mornings). On Friday and Saturday nights, WWNO plays jazz. WWNO has a local news staff covering New Orleans and Louisiana stories, with NPR covering world and national news.

== History ==
=== Early years ===
WWNO signed on the air on February 20, 1972. It was soon after the University of New Orleans adopted its current name. The school had previously been known as "Louisiana State University in New Orleans". KTLN was brought on line in 1995.

From its earliest days, WWNO was an NPR network affiliate. Originally WWNO was powered at only 5,000 watts. By 1980, the output had been increased to 50,000 watts on a 600-foot tower. Today the power is 35,000 watts but the height above average terrain (HAAT) has increased to 984 feet (299.8 meters). So WWNO's coverage extends throughout Southeast Louisiana and a section of Southwest Mississippi.

=== Hurricane Katrina ===
Prior to Hurricane Katrina making landfall in late August 2005, general manager Chuck Miller called extra staff in to the station to help, dropped the regular program format and shared as much information as possible about traffic, evacuation procedures and other news that would be helpful to the 86,000+ people who tune in each week. The building housing the studios had a back-up generator with buried transmission lines. The transmitter site also had generator power. The staff brought extra clothing and other personal items and were prepared to sleep away from windows. Computers and other valuable items were brought into interior rooms.

On the evening before the storm made landfall, the University of New Orleans shut down the IT department without informing the station personnel. WWNO was left without Internet access. Station staff turned to the television and other local radio for sources of information. Miller and the staff found themselves hunkering down in the station the Saturday before Katrina hit with sleeping bags and non-perishables to broadcast through the storm.

Four WWNO staff made it to work during the early morning hours of Sunday, August 28, 2005, Miller, Fred Kasten, James Arey and Jack Hopke. Two people handled the phones and monitored TV and the other two served on-air. Katrina was then declared Category 5 and headed straight for New Orleans. Miller requested and received permission to evacuate the staff from the station. WWNO signed over its signal to a local TV station.

The station was knocked off the air by Hurricane Katrina. The WWNO transmitter facility suffered a loss of nearly 200 feet of transmission line delivering audio to the antenna. Limited physical access and a lack of power hampered restoration of service. The generator ran but as the campus flooded, it shorted out the power lines. Staff were relocated to places all over the country.

When the storm was over, Miller and his team made calls to NPR and the Corporation for Public Broadcasting (CPB) to seek support for WWNO's restoration. CPB's Greg Schnerring suggested a satellite downlink to restore programming. Miller approached Georgia Public Broadcasting (GPB) in Atlanta about using a radio studio and delivery of the signal via a PBS uplink from Atlanta to New Orleans. GPB had the capacity and could send audio to New Orleans via a satellite system, using a studio GPB rarely used, and IT could set up WWNO's technology needs. Georgia Public Radio officials agreed to welcome WWNO to their studios until the station was able to return to its location on the UNO campus.

CPB provided an emergency $20,000 grant and non-commercial program providers NPR, Public Radio International and American Public Radio temporarily waived program costs. However, challenges remained with getting a non-profit station back on the air while its staff was scattered all over the country, its studios on the campus were inaccessible and its transmitter was disabled.

=== After Katrina ===
Relocated in Atlanta, Miller began looking for equipment to rebuild. WWNO Chief Engineer Robert Carroll was able to reach the crippled transmitter site on the West Bank of the New Orleans area with enough equipment and supplies to repair the facility and bring it up to operation. American Public Media offered a transmitter and engineering support. CPB offered two transmitters from Alaska, and more than 15 stations offered temporary employment, housing, clothing, food and transportation to the displaced WWNO staff. GPB spent about a week getting the studio ready along with fulfilling WWNO's IT requests while CPB worked on getting the fly-away downlink sent to New Orleans.

WWNO's chief engineer, Robert Carroll drove with police escort to see the station's transmitter site in Gretna. He immediately noticed that 200 feet of transmission line up the side of the tower was missing. Katrina's winds burst the clamps (every 8 feet). The line hit the ground with such force it left a mark in the concrete. When the equipment arrived, Carroll and operations manager Ron Curtis set up and aimed the downlink at the GPB satellite. The station kept its connection to the Crescent City via Program Director Fred Kasten, who built a studio in his home in New Orleans after returning from the evacuation.

=== Back on the air ===
WWNO returned to the air on September 2, 2005, from the studios of GPB in Atlanta, using the NPR downlink tied to the station's local transmitter and tower just outside New Orleans. Public service was the primary reason for being on the air. Every break was to have recovery information in it. The remote operations from Atlanta gave WWNO the technical ability to launch a local news department from 400 miles away.

Miller, Music Director James Arey, Announcer/producer Farrar Hudkins and Announcer/producer Jack Hopke worked double shifts for three months, broadcasting by satellite from GPB's studios. A generous local Atlanta resident let Arey and Hudkins live rent-free in a house. CPB funds helped furnish the home and pay utilities. Program director Fred Kasten set up a small studio in his damaged uptown home and assembled a team of feature reporters who helped WWNO paint an authentic picture of New Orleans' recovery from the scene. Kasten also broadcast his `Saturday Night Jazz' show from the home studio. Webmaster Shantel Washington worked from Roanoke, Virginia.

On Friday, September 23, less than one month after the devastation caused by Katrina, Hurricane Rita headed for the Gulf in the general direction of New Orleans. WWNO carried regular updates about Rita through the weekend. Luckily, Rita's damage was minimal. After 89 days in Atlanta, WWNO returned to its University of New Orleans studios on December 19, 2005. It has continued to air updates on New Orleans' recovery, years after the storm.

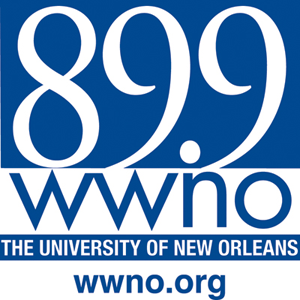
Former logo
