= KXUL =

- Monroe, Louisiana; United States
- Frequency: 91.1 MHz
- Branding: 91x New Rock

Programming
- Language: English
- Format: Alternative rock

Ownership
- Owner: University of Louisiana at Monroe

History
- Former call signs: KNLU (1973–2000)

Technical information
- Licensing authority: FCC
- Facility ID: 49404
- Class: C2
- ERP: 8,500 watts
- HAAT: 218.0 meters
- Transmitter coordinates: 32°39′38.00″N 91°59′28.00″W

Links
- Public license information: Public file; LMS
- Website: http://kxul.com

KXUL (91.1 FM, "91x New Rock") is a radio station broadcasting an Alternative rock music format. Licensed to Monroe, Louisiana, United States, the station is currently owned by University of Louisiana at Monroe.
