= KSYB =

Radio station in Shreveport, Louisiana

- Shreveport, Louisiana; United States
- Broadcast area: Shreveport–Bossier City metropolitan area
- Frequency: 1300 kHz
- Branding: 1300 AM KSYB

Programming
- Language: English
- Format: Gospel

Ownership
- Owner: Amistad Communications, Inc.

History
- First air date: August 26, 1974
- Former call signs: KFLO (1974–2002)

Technical information
- Licensing authority: FCC
- Facility ID: 49016
- Class: D
- Power: 5,000 watts (day); 30 watts (night)
- Transmitter coordinates: 32°31′48.5″N 93°48′16.6″W

Links
- Public license information: Public file; LMS
- Webcast: Listen live
- Website: www.amistadradiogroup.com

KSYB (1300 kHz, "1300 AM KSYB") is an American radio station licensed to Shreveport, Louisiana. The station broadcasts a gospel music format, and serves the Shreveport–Bossier City metropolitan area. KSYB is owned by Amistad Communications, Inc.

The station was assigned the call sign KFLO by the Federal Communications Commission on August 26, 1974. The station changed its call sign to KSYB on July 27, 2002.
