= KAYT =

- Jena, Louisiana; United States
- Broadcast area: Alexandria, Louisiana
- Frequency: 88.1 MHz

Programming
- Format: Urban contemporary/Christian

Ownership
- Owner: Black Media Works, Inc.

Technical information
- Licensing authority: FCC
- Facility ID: 18556
- Class: C1
- ERP: 70,000 watts horizontal 15,500 watts vertical
- HAAT: 307 meters
- Transmitter coordinates: 31°33′55.00″N 92°33′0.00″W

Links
- Public license information: Public file; LMS
- Website: http://www.kaytfm.com

KAYT (88.1 FM) is an American radio station broadcasting an Urban contemporary / Christian radio format. Licensed to Jena, Louisiana, United States, the station serves the Alexandria, Louisiana area. The station is currently owned by Black Media Works, Inc. The transmitter is located southwest of Dry Prong, Louisiana on the KLAX-TV tower.

== Translators ==
Call sign	Frequency	City of license	FID	ERP (W)	Class	FCC info
K223BI	92.5 FM	Greenwood, Louisiana	154364	180	D	LMS
K255BT	98.9 FM	Monroe, Louisiana	155420	250	D	LMS
W224BV	92.7 FM	Cedar Hills, Mississippi		30	D	
