= KHLL =

Radio station in Richwood–Monroe, Louisiana

Coordinates: 32°24′25″N 92°04′13″W

- Richwood, Louisiana; United States
- Broadcast area: Monroe-West Monroe
- Frequency: 100.9 MHz
- Branding: The Hill

Programming
- Language: English
- Format: Christian contemporary

Ownership
- Owner: Gilliland, Inc.

History
- First air date: 1995
- Call sign meaning: Hill

Technical information
- Licensing authority: FCC
- Facility ID: 15349
- Class: C3
- ERP: 25,000 watts
- HAAT: 100 meters (330 ft)

Links
- Public license information: Public file; LMS
- Webcast: Listen live
- Website: www.hillradio.com

KHLL (100.9 FM) is an American radio station broadcasting a Contemporary Christian Music format. Licensed to Richwood, Louisiana, United States, the station serves the Monroe, Louisiana area, and is owned by Gilliland, Inc.
