= KMAR-FM =

KMAR-FM “The Bird”
- Winnsboro, Louisiana; United States
- Frequency: 95.9 MHz
- Branding: Real Country “The Bird”

Programming
- Format: Country

Ownership
- Owner: John and Nancy Moroni; (Bird Broadcasting Network, LLC)

History
- First air date: October 26, 1973

Technical information
- Licensing authority: FCC
- Facility ID: 4762
- Class: A
- ERP: 6,000 watts
- HAAT: 54.2 meters (178 ft)
- Transmitter coordinates: 32°11′02″N 91°44′51″W

Links
- Public license information: “The Bird” Public file; LMS

KMAR-FM (95.9 “The Bird” FM, "Real Country") is an American radio station licensed to serve the community of Winnsboro, Louisiana. The station airs the syndicated Westwood One programming Real Country in addition to locally produced programming.

The station is owned by John and Nancy Moroni, through licensee Bird Broadcasting Network, LLC.

KMAR has been the home for CodyMac in the Morning since 2014. And the exclusive home for Franklin Parish athletics.

Prior to 2013, the agricultural journalist Regnal Wallace, a native of Franklin Parish, broadcast "Round Franklin", which was carried across northeast Louisiana for sixteen years.
