= KBMQ =

- Monroe, Louisiana; United States
- Broadcast area: Monroe, Louisiana
- Frequency: 88.7 MHz
- Branding: 88.7 The Cross

Programming
- Language: English
- Format: Christian Adult Contemporary

Ownership
- Owner: Media Ministries, Inc.

Technical information
- Licensing authority: FCC
- Facility ID: 22172
- Class: C2
- ERP: 25,000 watts
- HAAT: 139.6 meters
- Transmitter coordinates: 32°24′15″N 92°2′7″W

Links
- Public license information: Public file; LMS
- Website: Official website

KBMQ (88.7 MHz, "88.7 The Cross") is an American radio station broadcasting a Christian adult contemporary format. Licensed to Monroe, Louisiana, United States. The station is currently owned by Media Ministries Inc.

The station's general manager is Linda Meyers.
