= KBCL =

Radio station in Bossier City, Louisiana

- Bossier City, Louisiana; United States
- Broadcast area: Shreveport–Bossier City metropolitan area
- Frequency: 1070 kHz
- Branding: Praise 1070

Programming
- Language: English
- Format: Christian Talk

Ownership
- Owner: Barnabas Center Ministries

History
- First air date: September 13, 1957
- Former frequencies: 1220 kHz
- Call sign meaning: Bossier City, Louisiana

Technical information
- Licensing authority: FCC
- Facility ID: 55968
- Class: D
- Power: 250 watts (daytime only)
- Transmitter coordinates: 32°32′14″N 93°43′28″W

Links
- Public license information: Public file; LMS
- Webcast: Listen live
- Website: kbclthebridge.org

KBCL (1070 kHz, "Praise 1070") is an American radio station licensed to Bossier City, Louisiana. The station is broadcasting a Christian talk radio format. The station serves the Shreveport–Bossier City metropolitan area. The station is currently under ownership of Barnabas Center Ministries.
