= WGSO =

Coordinates: 29°57′25″N 90°9′33″W

New Orleans, Louisiana; United States
- Broadcast area: New Orleans metropolitan area
- Frequency: 990 kHz
- Branding: WGSO 990AM

Programming
- Format: Brokered programming and talk
- Affiliations: Townhall News

Ownership
- Owner: Northshore Radio, Inc

History
- First air date: January 27, 1968

Technical information
- Licensing authority: FCC
- Facility ID: 52433
- Class: B
- Power: 600 watts (day); 310 watts (night)

Links
- Public license information: Public file; LMS
- Webcast: Listen live
- Website: wgso.com

WGSO (990 AM) is a commercial radio station licensed to New Orleans, Louisiana. The station is owned by Northshore Radio, Inc, a non-profit corporation, and airs a mix of brokered programming and talk, including newscasts from Townhall News. The studios are on Carondelet Street.

The transmitter is off River Road in Jefferson, Louisiana, near the Mississippi River.

== History ==
The station signed on the air on January 27, 1946. It was originally a daytimer, required to go off the air at sunset. It used the call sign WJMR and was owned by George Mayoral, broadcasting from the Jung Hotel. WJMR was the sister station to FM outlet WRCM (now 97.1 WEZB) which actually went on the air the year before. In 1953, Mayoral added WJMR-TV, New Orleans' second television station, now WVUE-DT.

AM 990 went through a series of call letter and format changes over the years. In the mid-1950s it was home to disc jockey "Poppa Stoppa," whose program featured a new sound for its time, "Rock and Roll music." In 1964, when WJMR-TV was sold, AM 990's call sign was changed to WNNR (Winner Radio). It returned to the WJMR call letters between 1969 and 1972 but became WNNR again on January 24, 1972.

In the 1980s, it got approval from the Federal Communications Commission to stay on the air around the clock. The station briefly became WLTS in the fall of 1984. Those call letters lasted less than a year.

On June 4, 1985, 990 AM became WYAT. Those call letters capitalized on the local New Orleans expression "Where y'at?" The station aired a syndicated Oldies format with some local DJs during the day.

On December 1, 1993 the station became WGSO, airing an all news radio format. It used an audio feed of CNN Headline News for national news, with some local news inserts. In 2001, the station gave New Orleans its first Business Talk format. The station was billed as "City Business 990," touting its relationship with the local City Business newspaper. From 2004 to 2006, it was known as "BizRadio 990." During this time there were local hosts most of the day discussing money and business topics for investors. The station used syndicated programming in the evening and CNN Headline News in late nights.

Post-Katrina (2007), the station used the "Voice of the Northshore" moniker, aiming its news & traffic reports at St. Tammany Parish. This was problematic, as the station's signal on the Northshore of Lake Pontchartrain is weak during the day and practically unlistenable at nighttime power.

By 2009, the station changed management and adapted "Speakin' Easy New Orleans Style" as the station moniker. The lineup included local programming during the day (including Jeff Crouere, Tom Fitzmorris and Tim McNally) and syndicated programs at night, such as Michael Savage, Dr. Joy Browne, and Dr. Ronald Hoffman.
