= KBYO (AM) =

- Tallulah, Louisiana; United States
- Broadcast area: Monroe
- Frequency: 1360 kHz

Programming
- Format: Defunct (formerly Gospel)

Ownership
- Owner: First United Methodist Church of Tullulah, Louisiana

History
- First air date: 1954
- Former call signs: KTLD (1954–1982); KZZM (1982–1990)

Technical information
- Facility ID: 59997
- Class: D
- Power: 500 watts day 131 watts night
- Transmitter coordinates: 32°25′37″N 91°13′15″W

KBYO (1360 AM) was a radio station broadcasting a gospel music format. Licensed to Tallulah, Louisiana, U.S., the station served the Monroe area. The station was owned by First United Methodist Church of Tullulah, Louisiana.

== History ==
The station was assigned the call sign KZZM on November 15, 1982. On February 1, 1990, the station changed its call sign to KBYO.

On November 21, 2014, the Federal Communications Commission cancelled KBYO's license, due to the station having been silent for more than twelve months.
