= KDLA (AM) =

Radio station in De Ridder, Louisiana (1950–2019)

DeRidder, Louisiana; United States
- Frequency: 1010 kHz

Programming
- Format: Christian radio

Ownership
- Owner: Christian Broadcasting of De Ridder

History
- First air date: November 10, 1950
- Call sign meaning: DeRidder, Louisiana

Technical information
- Facility ID: 9028
- Class: D
- Power: 1,000 watts day 40 watts night
- Transmitter coordinates: 30°52′43″N 93°17′25″W

KDLA (1010 AM) was a radio station licensed to DeRidder, Louisiana, United States. The station was last owned by Christian Broadcasting of De Ridder. Previous owners include Willis Broadcasting and DSN. KDLA's daytime signal covered a large portion of the Lake Charles market. KDLA had a long history of formats over the years from Top-40, Urban, Sports to Religious programming. Its license was surrendered to the Federal Communications Commission on October 1, 2019, and cancelled on October 4, 2019.
