= WSHO =

- New Orleans, Louisiana; United States
- Broadcast area: New Orleans
- Frequency: 800 kHz
- Branding: Sonshine 800

Programming
- Format: Christian radio
- Affiliations: Salem Communications

Ownership
- Owner: Focal Point Media Group

Technical information
- Licensing authority: FCC
- Facility ID: 9235
- Class: B
- Power: 1,000 watts day 233 watts night
- Transmitter coordinates: 29°50′42.00″N 90°6′39.00″W

Links
- Public license information: Public file; LMS
- Website: Official website

WSHO (800 AM) is an American radio station broadcasting a Christian radio format. Licensed to New Orleans, Louisiana, United States, the station serves the New Orleans area. The station is currently owned by Focal Point Media Group (FPMG) and features programming from Moody Radio and Salem Communications.

== History ==
The 800 kHz was originally used by a R&B formatted station WBOK in the 1950s, until they moved over to 1230 kHz in 1962. But at the same time, WSHO, which was at 1230, moved their Broadway showtunes and call letters over to the current signal. In the late 1960s, they switched to Country until 1981, when they dropped the format for Adult Standards, broadcasting the "Music of Your Life" syndicated format. In 1982, they changed to religious programming.

During Hurricane Katrina, WSHO simulcasted United Radio Broadcasters of New Orleans from WWL (870 AM).
