= KBYO-FM =

- Farmerville, Louisiana; United States
- Broadcast area: Greater Monroe
- Frequency: 92.7 MHz
- Branding: Power 92.7

Programming
- Language: English
- Format: Contemporary worship

Ownership
- Owner: Media Ministries, Inc.

Technical information
- Licensing authority: FCC
- Facility ID: 68796
- Class: A
- ERP: 6,000 watts
- HAAT: 100 meters (330 ft)
- Transmitter coordinates: 32°40′31″N 92°19′10″W

Links
- Public license information: Public file; LMS
- Website: power927.fm

KBYO-FM (92.7 MHz) is an American radio station broadcasting a contemporary worship format. Licensed to serve the community of Farmerville, Louisiana, the station broadcasts to the greater Monroe area. The station is currently owned by Media Ministries, Inc.

After the departure of talk show hosts Dean Edell and Laura Schlessinger from terrestrial radio at the end of 2010, KBYO announced it would be changing to a music format known as "Fun Radio 92.7" in January 2011.

On August 14, 2014, following a brief period off air while being sold to Media Ministries, KBYO flipped to a Christian Hip-Hop/R&B format as Power 92.7.

On April 7, 2023, Power 92.7 shifted to contemporary worship music.
