= WBOK =

- New Orleans, Louisiana; United States
- Broadcast area: New Orleans area
- Frequency: 1230 kHz

Programming
- Format: Brokered programming, local news/talk and gospel

Ownership
- Owner: Equity Media LLC

Technical information
- Licensing authority: FCC
- Facility ID: 10917
- Class: C
- ERP: 1,000 watts unlimited
- Transmitter coordinates: 29°59′18.00″N 90°2′45.00″W
- Repeater: 750 KKNO (Gretna)

Links
- Public license information: Public file; LMS
- Webcast: Listen Live
- Website: wbok1230.com

WBOK (1230 AM) is a radio station, that has historically broadcast a variety of formats, including gospel and various local talk programs brokered by their hosts. Licensed within New Orleans, Louisiana, of the United States, this station has historically served the New Orleans area, by its contributions to the promotion and preservation of African American culture and history. This radio station regularly features programming and events that highlight the contributions and experiences of black individuals within the mixed culture of communities that makes New Orleans the Gumbo, while this seems to be a significant contribution to the celebration and education of black history. This radio station has a long history of serving the African American community and providing a platform for important discussions and a wide variety of perspectives. The station is currently owned by Equity Media LLC., which is a team composed of New Orleans native and actor/producer Wendell Pierce; Troy Henry, managing partner of Henry Consulting; and Jeff Thomas, founder of Thomas Media Services.

== History ==
AM 1230 was originally WJBW with a Top 40 format in the late 1950s, but by the end of the decade, it switched call letters to WSHO and became a Broadway music formatted outlet. In 1960, the station bought the Gem Theater for use as a studio but sold it shortly thereafter. In 1962, WBOK swapped signals with WSHO and moved its R&B format to the 1230 signal. The R&B format would last until the late 1970s when it evolved to its current format after it was sold to Bishop Levi Willis.

The failure of levees immediately following the landfall of Hurricane Katrina on August 29, 2005, resulted in flooding of WBOK's studio and offices. The station's transmitter site also received flood damage, and the broadcast tower was severely damaged.

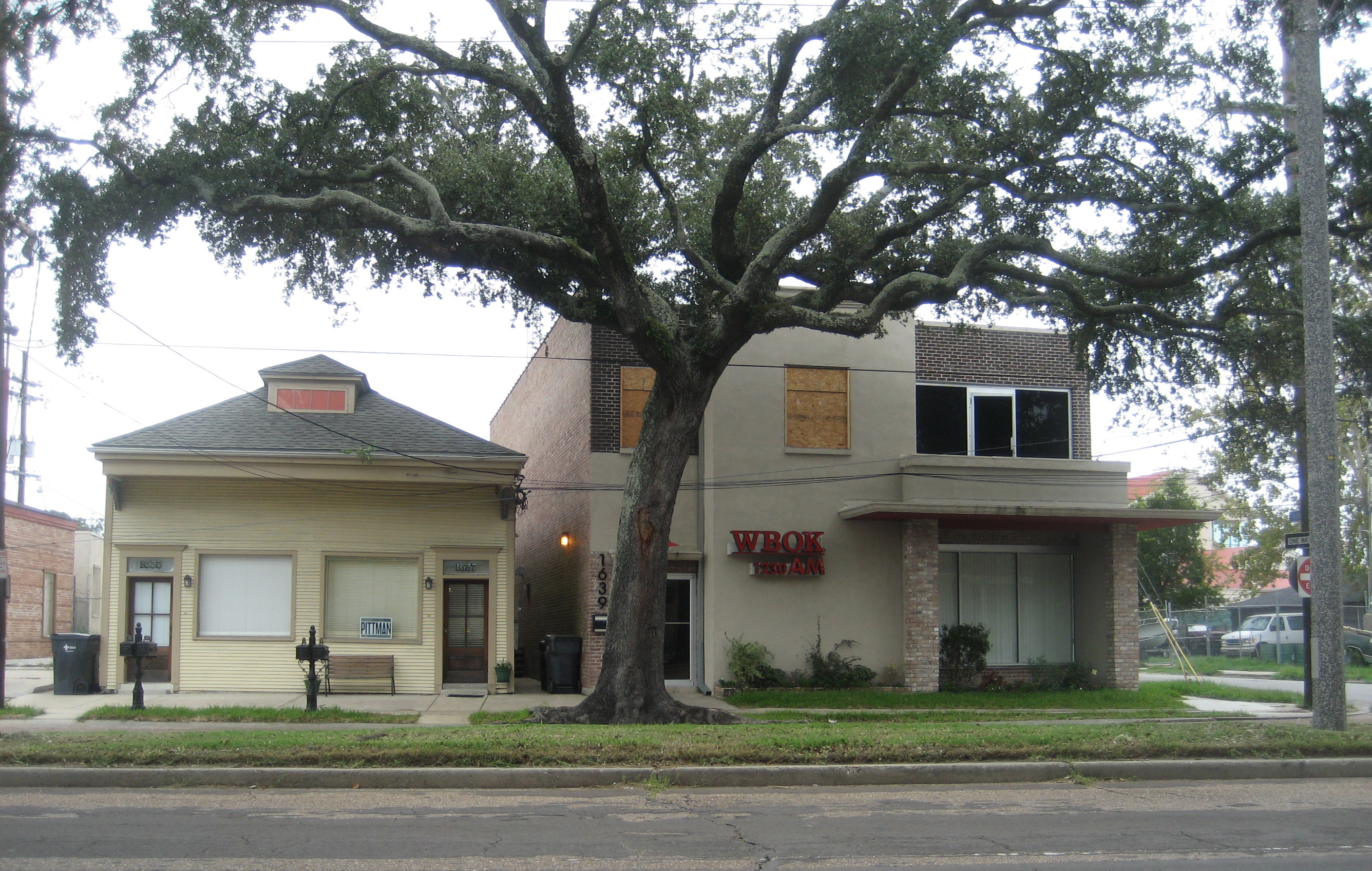
WBOK station in the Gentilly section of New Orleans, 2008.

WBOK returned to the air as of November 3, 2007, with an urban music and talk format, the station would work as an outlet for black political leaders to voice their opinion on matters because they felt as though the other outlets were supporting whites only.

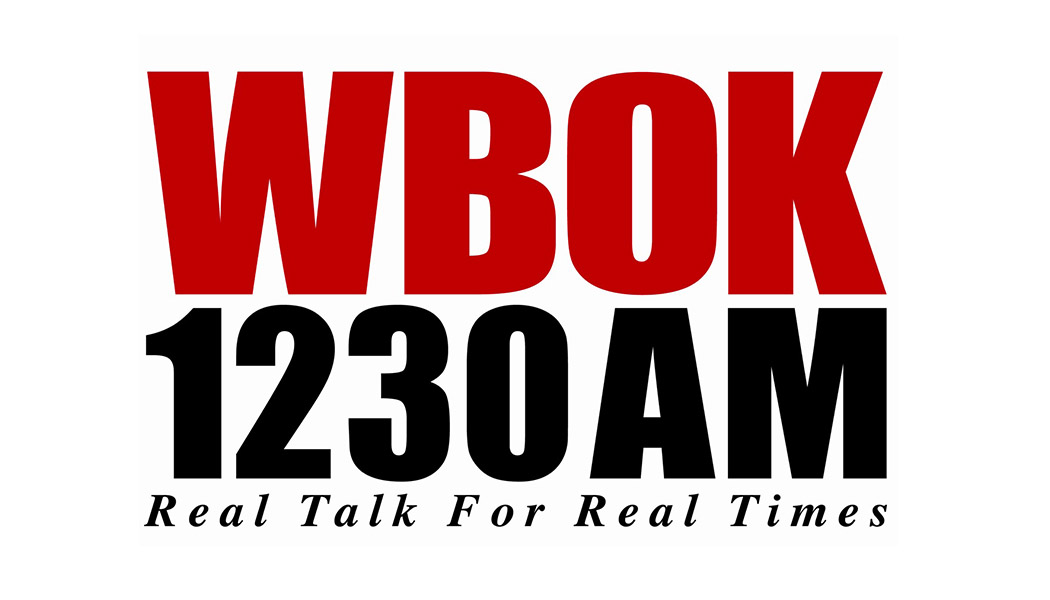
Previous logo

WBOK was owned since April 2007 by the Bakewell Media Company. Its principals, Danny Bakewell Sr. and Danny Bakewell Jr. are native New Orleanians who reside and operate several businesses in Los Angeles, California, including being owners of the Los Angeles Sentinel. The new broadcast outlet offered a window into the rapidly changing African American political consciousness in post-Katrina New Orleans. The new format, "Talk Back: Talk Black" marked a significant development in African American political life post-Katrina. Bakewell's comments on today's broadcast made it clear that his goal is to make WBOK a voice for African Americans in New Orleans and the Diaspora.

"WBOK listeners will hear elements of a political discourse that is emerging in the post-Katrina black community—marked by a trenchant critique of racism in the recovery, a relentless attack on the current governing black political class, and a forthright discussion of destructive behaviors that are undermining black community regeneration. With virtually all the New Orleans electronic media controlled by white elites, one can expect WBOK to become an important forum for a black dialogue and alternative perspectives on race, class, and recovery. Whether or not the "Talk Back Talk Black" radio format can find advertisers to ensure economic viability remains to be seen, especially given the decimation of the New Orleans black middle class and black businesses. But Bakewell seems to be guided by more a sense of justice than a desire for profit", wrote Lance Hill. Ph.D., Executive Director of the Southern Institute for Education and Research at Tulane University.

Effective January 2, 2020, Bakewell Media sold WBOK to Equity Media LLC for $550,000.
