= WUUU =

Coordinates: 30.7366°N 90.2015°W

- Franklinton, Louisiana; United States
- Broadcast area: Florida Parishes
- Frequency: 98.9 MHz
- Branding: Cat Country 98-9

Programming
- Format: Country

Ownership
- Owner: Pittman Broadcasting Services, L.L.C.

History
- First air date: 1995
- Former call signs: KAKA (1995–1996); WFCG-FM (1996–2003)

Technical information
- Licensing authority: FCC
- Facility ID: 22992
- Class: C3
- ERP: 25,000 watts
- HAAT: 100 meters (330 ft)

Links
- Public license information: Public file; LMS
- Webcast: Listen live
- Website: catcountry989.com

WUUU (98.9 MHz, "Cat Country 98.9") is an American country music-formatted radio station with offices in Covington, Louisiana and Hammond, Louisiana. The station, which is owned by Pittman Broadcasting Services, LLC., operates with an ERP of 25 kW.

== History ==
The station signed on the air in 1995 as a class A station playing country music owned by Gaco Broadcasting Corp. In May 2002, the station was sold to Marcus Pittman, III.

On December 18, 2013, the station was relocated to a new transmitter site just north of Folsom, Louisiana, and upgraded to a Class C3 operating at 25,000 watts. Two days later, the station returned to the air with a loop of "Roar" by Katy Perry.

On February 5, 2014, WUUU roars to Top-40 (CHR), branded as "Triple U 98.9". Three years later, the station roars back to country music, branded as "Cat Country 98.9".

=== Callsign history ===
The WUUU call sign once belonged to WNFZ/94.3 of Powell, Tennessee, in the 1970s. They were also used from 1982 to 1993 by WUMX/102.5 of Utica, New York, and from 1993 to 1996 by WARW/93.5 in Remsen, New York.
