= WBSN-FM =

Coordinates: 29.920°N 90.025°W

New Orleans, Louisiana; United States
- Broadcast area: New Orleans, Louisiana
- Frequency: 89.1 (MHz) (HD Radio)
- Branding: "LifeSongs Radio"

Programming
- Format: Contemporary Christian Music / Christian Talk and Teaching

Ownership
- Owner: Providence Educational Foundation

History
- First air date: 1979

Technical information
- Facility ID: 53677
- Class: C3
- ERP: 11,000 watts
- HAAT: 134 meters (440 ft)

Links
- Webcast: Listen Live
- Website: www.lifesongs.com

WBSN-FM is a Contemporary Christian outlet in New Orleans, Louisiana. The station, which operates at 89.1 MHz with an ERP of 11 kW, is owned by Providence Educational Foundation, which signed the outlet on the air in 1979.

== Programming ==
LifeSongs Radio airs a format consisting of Christian contemporary music. The Station broadcasts in HD radio and has a Christian Hip Hop format on its HD2 subchannel called "The Heat." LifeSongs Radio is simulcast on 2 translators, 95.1 in Hammond, and 89.5 in Houma.

== Network ==
WBSN is the flagship station of "LifeSongs Radio". LifeSongs is also heard on a translator on 97.7 in Houma, Louisiana, and was previously heard on KPEF in White Castle, Louisiana and WPEF in Kentwood, Louisiana until those stations' licenses were cancelled.

Call sign	Frequency	City of license	FID	ERP (W)	Class	FCC info
K208FW	89.5 FM	Houma, Louisiana	84546	200	D	LMS

== Recent license history ==
Prior to Hurricane Katrina, WBSN's 8,500 watt transmitter was co-located with that of TV station WDSU and shared their transmitting tower. After the WDSU transmitter building was flooded during Katrina, WBSN applied for, and was granted Special Temporary Authority (STA) from the FCC to transmit at 5,000 watts from a multi-purpose tower in Algiers. More recently, the station applied for and was granted a permanent license to transmit from the Algiers tower location at 11,000 watts.
