= New Orleans Saints Radio Network =

Sports radio network in Louisiana

The New Orleans Saints Radio Network is a radio network which carries games of the New Orleans Saints. The flagship stations of the radio network is 870 WWL-AM and 105.3 WWL-FM in New Orleans. Many of the stations that broadcast these games are almost entirely located around the Gulf Coast region, with stations mostly located in Louisiana and Mississippi with a few exceptions.

== Network Stations ==
=== Louisiana ===
KZMZ 96.9 FM Alexandria
WDGL 98.1 FM Baton Rouge
KJIN 1490 AM Houma
KMDL 97.3 FM Lafayette
KPEL 1420 AM/K277DQ 103.3 FM Lafayette
KNGT 99.5 FM Lake Charles
KLCL 1470 AM Lake Charles/DeRidder
KMLB 540 AM Monroe
KLIL 92.1 FM Moreauville
KQKI 95.3 FM Morgan City
WWL-FM 105.3 FM New Orleans (Flagship station)
WWL 870 AM New Orleans (Flagship station)
KRLQ 94.1 FM Ruston
KTAL 98.1 FM Shreveport/Texarkana
KVPI 92.5 FM Ville Platte
WBOX 920 AM Bogalusa
WBOX-FM 92.9 FM Bogalusa

=== Mississippi ===
WCJU 104.9 FM Columbia
WDMS 100.7 FM Greenville
WMXI 98.1 FM Hattiesburg/Laurel
WBBL 96.5 FM Richton
WJDX 620 AM Jackson
WRBE 106.9 FM Lucedale
WAZA 107.7 FM McComb
WALT-FM 102.1 FM Meridian
WQNZ 95.1 FM Natchez
WJDR 98.3 FM Prentiss

=== Alabama ===
WNSP 105.5 FM Mobile

=== Florida ===
WPNN 790 AM Pensacola
103.7 W279CY Pensacola (translator of WPNN 790)

=== Arkansas ===
KWLT 102.7 FM Crossett

=== Former affiliates (94 stations) ===
- WYAM 1450: Bessemer, Alabama
- WAQY 1220: Birmingham, Alabama
- WPRN 1240: Butler, Alabama
- WKLF 1000: Clanton, Alabama
- WXAL 1400: Demopolis, Alabama
- WULA 1240: Eufaula, Alabama
- WULA 1470: Evergreen, Alabama
- WABF 1220: Fairhope, Alabama
- WNDA 95.1: Huntsville, Alabama
- WHOD 1290: Jackson, Alabama
- WMOO 1550: Mobile, Alabama
- WKRG 710: Mobile, Alabama
- WMGY 800: Montgomery, Alabama
- WAMA 1340: Selma, Alabama
- WJRD 1150: Tuscaloosa, Alabama
- KJWH 1450: Camden, Arkansas
- KELD 1400: El Dorado, Arkansas
- KFFA 1360: Helena, Arkansas
- KZNG 1340: Hot Springs, Arkansas
- KVMA 630: Magnolia, Arkansas
- KADL 1270: Pine Bluff, Arkansas
- KCLA 1400: Pine Bluff, Arkansas
- KOSY 790: Texarkana, Arkansas
- WKMK 1000: Blountstown, Florida
- WRTM 102.3: Blountstown, Florida
- WSCM 1290: Panama City Beach, Florida
- WNVY 1230: Pensacola, Florida
- KROF 960: Abbeville, Louisiana
- WJBO 1150: Baton Rouge, Louisiana
- WLUX 1550: Baton Rouge, Louisiana
- WAFB-FM 98.1: Baton Rouge, Louisiana
- WIKC 1490: Bogalusa, Louisiana
- KSIG 1450: Crowley, Louisiana
- WFCG 1110: Franklinton, Louisiana
- WTGI 103.3: Hammond, Louisiana
- KXKW 1520: Lafayette, Louisiana
- KAOK 1400: Lake Charles, Louisiana
- KLIC 1230: Monroe, Louisiana
- KREB 106.1: Monroe, Louisiana
- KMRC 1430: Morgan City, Louisiana
- KDXI 1360: Natchitoches, Louisiana
- KANE 1240: New Iberia, Louisiana
- KNIR 1360: New Iberia, Louisiana
- KWCL 1110: Oak Grove, Louisiana
- KPBC 1510: Port Sulphur, Louisiana
- KRMD 1340: Shreveport, Louisiana
- KBSF 1460: Springhill, Louisiana
- KTIB-FM 106.3: Thibodaux, Louisiana
- WMPA 1240: Aberdeen, Mississippi
- WRKN 970: Brandon, Mississippi
- WJMB 1340: Brookhaven, Mississippi
- WMGO 1370: Canton, Mississippi
- WROX 1450: Clarksdale, Mississippi
- WDSK 1410: Cleveland, Mississippi
- WDSK-FM 92.7: Cleveland, Mississippi
- WFFF 1360: Columbia, Mississippi
- WCBI 550: Columbus, Mississippi
- WDRU 95.3: Drew, Mississippi
- WMAG 860: Forest, Mississippi
- WABG 960: Greenwood, Mississippi
- WRIL 100.1: Grenada, Mississippi
- WBKH 950: Hattiesburg, Mississippi
- WFOR 1400: Hattiesburg, Mississippi
- WNLA 1380: Indianola, Mississippi
- WKXI 94.7: Jackson, Mississippi
- WAML 1340: Laurel, Mississippi
- WNSL 890: Laurel, Mississippi
- WRBE 1440: Lucedale, Mississippi
- WMOX 1010: Meridian, Mississippi
- WDAL 1330: Meridian, Mississippi
- WNAT 1450: Natchez, Mississippi
- WNAU 1470: New Albany, Mississippi
- WSUH 550: Oxford, Mississippi
- WOOR-FM 97.5: Oxford, Mississippi
- WCIS 1460: Pascagoula, Mississippi
- WTUP 1490: Tupelo, Mississippi
- WQMV 98.7: Vicksburg, Mississippi
- WJFL 1490: Vicksburg, Mississippi
- WABO 990: Waynesboro, Mississippi
- WJNS-FM 92.1: Yazoo City, Mississippi
- KDOX 1410: Marshall, Texas
- KOGT 1600: Orange, Texas
- KOLE 1340: Port Arthur, Texas
- KTBB 600: Tyler, Texas
