= WWL =

WWL may refer to:

- Willa's Wild Life, TV series
- World Wrestling League, a professional wrestling promotion in Puerto Rico
- World Wrestling Legends, a professional wrestling promotion based in the United States
- Wallenius Wilhelmsen Logistics, Norwegian and Swedish RORO shipping company and logistics provider
- WWL (AM), a radio station (870 AM) licensed to New Orleans, Louisiana, United States
- WWL-FM, a radio station (105.3 FM) licensed to Kenner, Louisiana, simulcasting WWL
- WWL-TV, a television station (channel 27, virtual 4) licensed to New Orleans, Louisiana
- WLMG, an FM radio station on 101.9 MHz from New Orleans, which was the original WWL-FM, and used that callsign from 1970-80.
