= Crescent City Radio =

Internet radio station at Loyola University New Orleans

- New Orleans, Louisiana; United States
- Frequency: Internet radio

Programming
- Languages: English; Spanish
- Format: Freeform Campus radio

Ownership
- Owner: Loyola University New Orleans

History
- First air date: 1959 as WVSU-AM; 1966 as WOLF-AM; 1968 as WLDC-AM; 2008 as Crescent City Radio
- Former names: WVSU-AM (1959–1966); WOLF-AM (1966–1968); WLDC-AM (1969–1977; 1980–1996)
- Former frequencies: 640 kHz; WLDC-TV Closed-circuit Channel 2; WLDC-TV Closed-circuit Channel 8

Links
- Webcast: Listen live
- Website: crescentcityradio.com

Crescent City Radio is an internet radio station based in New Orleans serving Metropolitan New Orleans and southern Mississippi as well as globally through its internet presence as a Freeform radio station. The station broadcasts a diverse offering of music along with locally produced entertainment and talk programs. Music genres typically aired include urban contemporary, mainstream urban, adult contemporary, swamp pop, gospel, and Latin CHR. The station is managed and operated by the Music Industry Studies Program of the College of Music and Fine Arts at Loyola University New Orleans.

== History ==
=== WVSU-AM ===
The origins of Crescent City Radio and student-run radio at Loyola University begin with WVSU-AM, meaning the Voice of the Student Union, broadcasting from the balcony in Marquette Theater of Marquette Hall around 1959 according to The Wolf (yearbook). The station was managed and operated by the Department of Communications as part of the student media group, Loyola Student Media, which today manages The Maroon, Wolf Magazine, and The Maroon Online.

=== WOLF-AM ===
At the end of the 1965–66 school year in Spring 1966, WVSU-AM changed its call letters to WOLF-AM to reflect the university's mascot, the Wolf Pack. The station moved to the basement of the Danna Student Center beneath the Orleans Room's kitchen. The station continued as an AM carrier-current station transmitting on 640 kHz. to all of Loyola University's and Dominican College's residential halls.

=== WLDC-AM ===
At the start of the 1968–69 school year in fall 1968, WOLF-AM changed its call letters to WLDC-AM naming it after the Loyola Department of Communications. The call letters were changed from orders of the Federal Communications Commission because a commercial station was using the WOLF-AM call letters. The station would broadcast within the residential halls at the campuses of Loyola University and Dominican College, currently Loyola's Broadway campus. WLDC-AM would become affiliated with the American Contemporary Radio Network and air ABC Contemporary News broadcasts five minutes before the hour, with sports and features. Local news was aired 25 minutes past the hour. During the late 1960s, the radio program "Pulse" aired from 9:00 p.m. to midnight on Sundays which included popular music and interviews on local and campus-wide news.

On November 28, 1971, WLDC-AM returns on the air under the moniker "Renaissance Radio" with double its previous reception power and a new format that included Top 40, jazz, soul, progressive, and classical. News was previously taken from wire services, but with the relaunch, there were now four daily newscasts with on campus news and sports along with local news. All news content was gathered and written by station staff. The station also played throughout the Danna Center daily from 11:30 a.m. – 1:30 p.m. and from 4:30 p.m. – 6:00 p.m. In February 1972, Renaissance Radio WLDC-AM, began broadcasting evening re-runs of radio serials including The Adventures of Superman, The Weird Circle, The Shadow, Buck Rogers, The Strange Dr. Weird, The Whistler, and I Love a Mystery. Other programs that aired starting in 1972 were Howard Cosell and the WLDC interview program Sessions on Sundays at 9:00 p.m. In February 1972, WLDC-AM begins broadcasting to a third college in the New Orleans area, Xavier University of Louisiana for which the station began to play more music from black artists. WLDC-AM went the air in 1977.

On February 4, 1980, WLDC-AM came back on the air. WLDC-AM aired a progressive radio format with news bulletins from ABC Radio Network's American Contemporary Network service from the American Information Network along with cultural news bulletins produced by WLDC-AM's news operation. In 1986, the university's new Communications/Music Complex is dedicated and WLDC-AM and WLDC-TV move to its new studios on the 4th floor. The entire floor is equipped with several professional studios for the television station, editing rooms, a newsroom, control rooms and recording booths for WLDC-AM. This would be the third place to house the radio station. By 1993, closed-circuit WLDC-TV Channel 8 was no longer broadcasting the audio of WLDC-AM and Marriott Corporation, which managed the Danna Center, did not allow for WLDC-AM to broadcast over its PA system. During the 1990s, student interest was drastically lower and the future was uncertain. In 1996, WLDC-AM, still under the School of Mass Communication, goes off the air for the final time.

WLDC-AM throughout its existence continuously received criticism for its limited and poor quality reception. A listenable signal was available to only certain locations at Loyola University, notably in the dormitories, and it was criticized for its never being able to become a broadcast station through a license with the Federal Communications Commission which would have allowed for WLDC-AM to be heard within a broadcasting radius over the air instead of through carrier-current. Since Loyola also owned WWL-AM and FM until 1989, this would have run up against the fact that it was then against FCC regulations for one owner to have two or more broadcast radio stations on the same band in the same market. (This rule was subsequently rescinded; station owners in many markets now own several stations on both AM and FM bands.) Near the final demise of WLDC-AM, the lack of audience because of its limited transmission and its failed attempts to solicit a radio license because of an already crowded radio market in New Orleans caused a lack of interest between the student body and the communications department.

=== Crescent City Radio ===
In 2005, Loyola's Music Industry Studies program presented a proposal to the University Communications Committee to approve the creation of a college radio station at Loyola University New Orleans as an internet radio station.

The following year, the approved proposal was given a final approval by the university president, Rev. Kevin Wildes, S.J. and Crescent City Radio went online in spring 2008, broadcasting from WLDC-AM's former studios in the Communications/Music Complex. Crescent City Radio, the new student-run commercial radio station, would not be part of Loyola Student Media or the School of Mass Communication, but rather the Music Industry Studies program in the College of Music and Fine Arts.

=== Loyola-operated stations ===
The following is a history of radio and television broadcasting assets of Loyola University New Orleans.

=== WWL ===
Crescent City Radio and broadcasting at Loyola University New Orleans has its origins with WWL by first broadcasting on 833 kc. in 1922 from Marquette Hall on Loyola University New Orleans's main campus. The station then changed frequencies to 1070 kc. in 1924, 1090 kc. in 1925, 1220 kc. in 1927, and then at 850 kc. in 1929 when a 5,000 watt transmitter was installed in Bobet Hall. The station became affiliated with the CBS Radio Network on November 1, 1935. In 1937, the station increased its transmission power to 50,000 watts. The station settled at 870 kc. in 1946. At this time, WWL broadcast from the Roosevelt Hotel in downtown New Orleans.

==== WWL-TV ====
On September 7, 1957, Loyola University New Orleans establishes WWL-TV, the fourth-oldest television station in New Orleans, as the area's CBS affiliate. History of Television Operations from the university

==== WWL-FM ====
By 1960, the first WWL-FM by the university at 101.9 MHz began broadcasting a beautiful music radio format until the early 1970s from a transmitter in northern Kenner, Louisiana close to the shores of Lake Pontchartrain. WWL-FM would switch to a Top 40 radio format but revert to beautiful music by May 1976. On December 26, 1980, WWL-FM became WAJY JOY 102 and then became KLMG Magic 102, both airing an adult contemporary radio format. By 1995, KLMG now owned by Entercom Communications, would rebrand itself as Magic 101.9.

WWL-FM currently also owned by Entercom Communications would return to the airwaves at 105.3 MHz in April 2006 simulcasting WWL's signal after previously doing so on August 29, 2005, when then WKZN's transmitter was damaged because of Hurricane Katrina. Shortly after the storm, the station switched to WKBU as Bayou 105.3 airing a classic rock radio format. In October 2005, both WKBU and WTKL Kool 95.7 would swap frequencies. WKBU would change from transmitting from Kenner to New Orleans and 105.3 MHz would become WTKL Kool 105.3. Then in April 2006, WTKL was moved to an Internet webcast and WWL-FM would return to the airwaves on 105.3 MHz simulcasting WWL's signal in an effort to increase listenership within office buildings or other places where AM broadcasting could not penetrate. Shortly after, The Delta a blues radio format would begin to broadcast on 105.3 HD2.

==== KATC-TV ====
During the 1970s, Loyola University New Orleans owned KATC-TV in Lafayette, Louisiana as the area's ABC affiliate and WWL-TV's sister station.

== News operation ==
Crescent City Radio does not run a news operation and focuses on airing music content. Any news content is independently created by individual shows at their discretion.

In agreement with Loyola Student Media, podcasts from The Maroon, Loyola University New Orleans's weekly newspaper aired several times a day with The Maroon's latest print headlines and updated weekly. The recordings were available as podcasts on The Maroon Online. Podcasting from each section in The Maroon began on Monday, November 27, 2006, for distribution only on The Maroon Online. Eventually, a single weekly podcast was produced by The Maroon's webmaster and aired on Crescent City Radio during the entire week. The podcast consisted of readings from several sections of the latest Maroon. As of May 2010, The Maroon stopped recording podcasts.

Previously when the station was WLDC-AM and part of Loyola Student Media and the School of Mass Communication, the station ran a news department in which regular local news bulletins were written and aired by news staff. When the station began using the WLDC-AM call letters, the station was affiliated to ABC Radio’s American Contemporary Network for news bulletins, newscasts, and content. From about 1969-70, a radio program called "Pulse" aired on WLDC-AM that included current hit music along with interviews and discussions relating current campus news stories and issues along with news reports from ABC News Radio.

== Television operations ==
=== Television studios ===
Studio C in the Communications/Music Complex at the university, along with Crescent City Radio are managed by the Music Industry Studies Program from the College of Music and Fine Arts. "Pack News" from Loyola Student Media shoots its weekly news updates in this studio. The Music Industry Studies Program also shoots interviews, in-studio sessions, and holds classes in the studio. University public affairs also uses the studio for interviews.

==== Pack News ====
"Pack News" is an online video-based news service produced by the university's student charter of the RTDNA and hosted by Loyola Student Media, shoots its weekly news updates with entertainment and commentary in Studio C. "Pack News" is hosted on Loyola Student Media's web site, The Maroon Online and on YouTube. "Pack News" has returned the production of video-based news to the university since the broadcasting program was eliminated in 2007 with university-wide Pathways elimination plan. The "Pack News" newsroom is also a classroom computer-lab across the hall from Studio C is also the former newsroom for WLDC-TV.

==== Music News ====
In 2010 to 2011, the Music Industry Studies Program taped "Music News", a news update on the music industry in Studio C. The news update was previously called "Loyola Music News" and also produced an update in Spanish under the same title.

=== History of Loyola-operated stations ===
Stations that were assets of Loyola University New Orleans.

=== WWL-TV ===
Before 1989, when WWL was owned by Loyola University New Orleans, the university operated WWL-TV Channel 4 beginning on September 7, 1957, from the current Rampart Street studios, previously a 7-Up bottling plant in the French Quarter. After 1989, channel 4 was run by Rampart Broadcasting until it was sold to Belo Corp in 1994.

=== KATC-TV ===
During the 1970s, KATC-TV, Channel 3 in Lafayette, Louisiana was owned by Loyola University New Orleans and was WWL-TV's sister station. Previously, the station was owned by the Acadian Television Company since the station first launched on September 19, 1962. In 1984, the university sold the station to Merrill Lynch. Channel 3 was then sold in 1998 to Cordillera Communications, the television unit of the Evening Post Publishing Company.

=== History of Loyola internal stations ===
Stations that were once operated by the School of Mass Communication of Loyola University New Orleans and aired for within the university.

=== WLDC-TV Channel 2 and 8 ===
WLDC-TV began broadcasting from its studios in the basement of the Danna Student Center beneath the kitchen of the Orleans Room dining room, as part of the Loyola Student Media cluster in the School of Mass Communication. Therefore, the call letters are named after the "Loyola Department of Communications". Broadcasting began on March 26, 1973, at noon broadcasting a 15-minute newscast only to five monitors on channel 2 in the Danna Center dining hall known as the A la Carte, with an additional monitor added later to the contract dining hall, also known as the Orleans and St. Charles Rooms respectively through closed-circuit television. Programming began airing Monday through Friday from 12:00 p.m. - 12:30 p.m. The creation of the television station was part of the originals aims of the communications department since it was established in the spring of 1967. The station manager for WLDC-TV and AM was Mike Hadley.

On the following semester on October 22, 1973, at 10:30 a.m., the station signed on again and could be watched on closed-circuit television in the Danna Center. The channel began broadcasting only on weekdays from 10:30 a.m. to 12:30 p.m.

Daily programming began with a 15-minute preview followed by Star Trek at 10:45 a.m. followed by 15 minutes of news analysis and commentary. On Mondays, a sports update would air covering local college and Loyola games. On Tuesdays, the "Music and Drama Show" would air with cultural and entertainment news along with student performances. Student Government Association activities would air on Thursdays. The news analysis show, "Take Two" would air on the last 15 minutes of every broadcasting day.

The station's news operation covered campus and local news with national and international news from the Associated Press.

The founding faculty advisor was Norman C. Stein, an assistant professor of communications at the time. At its founding, between 50 and 75 students accounted for the production of content on WLDC-TV.

Throughout the station's history, channel would focus on producing news content. Like The Maroon, the university weekly newspaper, WLDC-TV produced a weekly newscast that would air within the university on closed-circuit cable channel 2.

In 1986, WLDC-AM and WLDC-TV moved to their new studios in the Communication/Music Complex on the fourth floor with several professional television studios for WLDC-TV, a newsroom, control rooms, and recording booths, for WLDC-AM. In 1996, WLDC-AM goes off the air due to lack of interest and funding, while in 2006, institutional eliminations in the Pathways program eliminated the broadcast sequences from the School of Mass Communication and thus ending WLDC-TV in 2007.

==== Pathways eliminations ====
WLDC-TV and the broadcasting sequence from the School of Mass Communication were eliminated along with the broadcasting faculty during the Pathways program after Hurricane Katrina in 2005 when the university cut funding for many programs and fired faculty, many before their tenure, due to the university's assumption that enrollment would go down after Hurricane Katrina, which displaced students for half an academic year. Many former faculty sued the university. In June 2011, the American Association of University Professors officially removed the university from its censure list after a solicitation from the university's chapter in May 2011.

=== LSCN Channel 8 ===
In Fall 2006, campus-wide (except Broadway Campus) television channel LSCN Channel 8, would then become operated by the Office of Residential Life, replacing WLDC-TV as a 24-hour movie channel, airing pre-selected movies and educational material which broadcast from the Danna Student Center basement. The same package of movies would air for an entire month and replaced the following month with a new line-up of movies. It was typical for the Office of Residential Life to send out polls via e-mail to all its residents in all dormitories (except Cabra Hall) asking which movies should air the following month. LSCN Channel 8 went dark in 2010.

=== MtvU ===
As of Fall 2012, MtvU began broadcasting its national feed on the campus-wide television channel 8. The Office of Residential Life, under the Office of Co-Curricular Activities of Loyola University New Orleans had signed a contract with Viacom since the start of 2012 in order to receive and broadcast MtvU's signal. Channel 8 is operated by the Office of Co-Curricular for the use of the Office of Residential Life.

== Programing ==
Programs are produced at Crescent City Radio and most are broadcast live. Primetime during the week consists mostly of urban formatted music programs. Music rotations with different genres air every hour between shows. Most programming hours are aired in English with some programming only in Spanish. Some programs may change air day and time every four months (three times) in a year. Talent and program directors do not need to be affiliated with Loyola University New Orleans and are free to decide the content of their programming.

=== Musical influences ===
As a Freeform radio station, Crescent City Radio airs programs that range from Urban radio formats like urban contemporary, mainstream urban, and gospel, varying adult contemporary radio formats, several New Orleans music genres, and specific Louisiana roots music and dance southern region genres like swamp pop. Other radio formats that air on programs include, Latin Top 40 pop, Rock en Español, K-pop, and J-pop. Music rotations air classical, reggae, and unsolicited music submissions from artists.

=== Station image ===
Crescent City Radio identifies itself with the Crescent City of New Orleans, hence the station's name. Stingers aired on the station include, "You're rolling down the river with Crescent City Radio dot com", which is related to the Mississippi River, which runs through New Orleans, "Get your fill of musical gumbo on Crescent City Radio dot com" relates to Louisiana's typical stew of gumbo, and another stinger aired is, "You're listening to Crescent City Radio, its music for your mind", which includes the station's motto. In Spanish, the station's stinger is "Estas escuchando Crescent City Radio, es música para tus oídos". The station's motto, "Music for your mind" could possibly relate to the station's Freeform format.

=== Live performances ===
With a bi-directional audio link with the nearby recording studio facilities, the station is able to feature high quality live performances. Musical acts frequently perform live, on the air and are recorded by station and university staff by using a digital audio workstation software, a multi-channel recording format. Recordings are provided to the artists for use as demo recordings or for archival purposes. The radio station has a public lounge area overlooking St. Charles Avenue where visitors may see on-air talent live inside the studio through a soundproof glass barrier. Speakers were once in the lounge which allowed visitors to experience the station as it aired live worldwide. The speakers were removed under the decision by the station ˈs faculty advisor.

== Personnel ==
Although the station's faculty advisor must be affiliated with the university as a faculty member, Crescent City Radio allows all positions to be held by members of the general public.

=== Notable former station staff ===
- LeBron "LBJ" Joseph - on-air personality (1980; now at WGNO-TV as co-anchor of News with a Twist and co-host on The Hometeam Morning Show on KMEZ 106.7)
- Mike Ross - general manager (1979 - 1980; now at KTUU-TV as anchor and managing editor)
- Elliot "Chef 24/7" Smith - on-air personality (2017–2019) was host of Kitchen Talk Radio Show which originally aired on TMI Media One (Season 1) but was later moved to Crescent City Radio (Seasons 2–4); now comedian, entrepreneur, and producer/director at Infomux Media,
