= WCJU =

WCJU may refer to:

- WCJU (AM), a radio station (1450 AM) licensed to serve Columbia, Mississippi, United States
- WSSM (FM), a radio station (104.9 FM) licensed to serve Prentiss, Mississippi, which held the call sign WCJU-FM from 2001 to 2020
