= KFXY =

KFXY may refer to:

- KFXY (FM), a radio station (90.3 FM) licensed to serve Buena Vista, Colorado, United States; see List of radio stations in Colorado
- KWSQ-LP, a low-power radio station (99.5 FM) licensed to serve Mesa, Arizona, United States, which held the call sign KFXY-LP from 2016 to 2022
- KZLS (AM), a radio station (1640 AM) licensed to serve Enid, Oklahoma, United States, which held the call sign KFXY from 2005 to 2013
- KJIN, a radio station (1490 AM) licensed to serve Houma, Louisiana, United States, which held the call sign KFXY from 2000 to 2013
- KCIL, a radio station (96.7 FM) licensed to serve Gray, Louisiana, which held the call sign KFXY from 1979 to 2000
- KUMA (Arizona), a defunct radio station (1420 AM) licensed to serve Yuma, Arizona, which held the call sign KFXY from 1925 to 1932
