= WHSY (1230 AM) =

Radio station in Hattiesburg, Mississippi

- Hattiesburg, Mississippi; United States
- Frequency: 1230 kHz

Ownership
- Owner: Hub City Broadcasting, Inc.
- Sister stations: WHSY-FM

History
- First air date: September 24, 1948
- Last air date: May 16, 1994
- Former frequencies: 1220 kHz (1948–1949)

Technical information
- Facility ID: 29548
- Power: 1,000 watts
- Transmitter coordinates: 31°20′55″N 89°17′00″W

WHSY was a radio station that broadcast on 1230 AM in Hattiesburg, Mississippi, United States. It was owned by Charles W. Holt's Hub City Broadcasting Company and broadcast from 1948 to 1994. The studios and transmitter were located on U.S. Route 11 in what is today Petal.

== History ==
=== Early years ===
The Hub City Broadcasting Company obtained a construction permit to build a new radio station on 1220 kHz in Hattiesburg, Mississippi, on April 29, 1948. The original owners were Charles W. Holt, Marvin Reuben and Vernon Cheek; Holt and Reuben had been announcers together at a radio station in Montgomery, Alabama. They had been granted the permit after changing their proposed frequency from 1230 kHz to 1220, a minor shift that required the new station to start out as a daytime-only operation. Construction proceeded, and WHSY went on the air on September 24, 1948. Reuben sold his interest ten months later. The new station had barely been on the air when its owners petitioned to move to 1230 kHz and regain the ability to broadcast at night; this was granted on August 11, 1949, and implemented on August 28. The station became an ABC affiliate.

WHSY was part-owned by David A. Matison in the 1950s. Matison would sell his interest in WHSY and other stations to Holt in 1955, a deal contemporaneous with the withdrawal of a Holt-backed bid to build a television station on channel 9 in Hattiesburg, allowing Matison to start WDAM-TV. WHSY was allowed to increase its power to 1,000 watts in 1960. By the 1960s, Holt owned a total of four stations, with another Mississippi outlet in McComb and stations in Montgomery and Prichard, Alabama. Another was added on July 1, 1967, when WHSY-FM 104.5 began broadcasting.

=== Financial difficulties and closure ===
Holt-Robinson Communications, the partnership between Holt and Robert N. Robinson that owned the Montgomery station (but not the WHSY stations, which Holt owned outright), expanded into television in the early 1980s. In 1983, it was able to sign on WTWC-TV in Tallahassee, Florida—a station whose sign-on was delayed by the collapse of its transmitting tower during construction. That event and lack of funding helped to scuttle the company's plans to build channel 35 in Marshall, Texas (currently in the Shreveport-Texarkana media market). In the late 1980s, the station switched to a news/talk format using a mix of ABC, CBS News Radio and Mutual Broadcasting System programs, as well as simulcasts of the audio of WDAM-TV's local news programs. WHSY had aired Hattiesburg High School football for 43 consecutive years prior to moving to FM on the 44th–and final–season with the stations in 1993; the station manager, Ted Tibbett, was the team's radio voice. The station also aired New Orleans Saints football and Ole Miss Rebels athletics in its final year; it had previously dumped The Rush Limbaugh Show because of its cost.

In 1992, Hub City Broadcasting filed for bankruptcy reorganization. The AM and FM had been down on their luck; poor ratings on the FM led to the loss of many national advertising accounts, starving the station of revenue. That prompted the Chapter 11 proceeding to turn into a Chapter 7 liquidation, with $31,000 in tax liens hanging over the station. After two restraining orders temporarily prevented bankruptcy trustee J. C. Bell from seizing the company's assets, the second order was left to expire. On May 16, 1994, Bell impounded the equipment and took WHSY-AM-FM off the air. Holt blamed problems with the Tallahassee television station for causing financial drains that hurt the Hattiesburg radio operation.

Blakeney Broadcasting, owner of WBBN, acquired the WHSY stations at bankruptcy auction, beating out two other parties with a winning bid of $450,000. After a lengthy hiatus, the FM station was put back into service on April 1, 1995, as WXRR "Rock 104".

The AM station never returned to air; its license, having been off air more than a year, was canceled on February 9, 1997, one of the first such cancellations under Section 312(g) of the Telecommunications Act of 1996. Holt would later buy another of Hattiesburg's heritage radio stations, the former WBKH at 950 kHz, and give it the WHSY call letters; Holt died at the age of 96 in 2018.
