= WEZB =

- New Orleans, Louisiana; United States
- Broadcast area: New Orleans metropolitan area
- Frequency: 97.1 MHz (HD Radio)
- Branding: B97 FM

Programming
- Language: English
- Format: Contemporary hit radio
- Subchannels: HD2: Channel Q
- Affiliations: Premiere Networks

Ownership
- Owner: Audacy, Inc.; (Audacy License, LLC)
- Sister stations: WKBU; WLMG; WWL; WWL-FM; WWWL

History
- First air date: September 1, 1945; 80 years ago
- Former call signs: WRCM (1945–1967); WNNR-FM (1967–1972)
- Call sign meaning: EZ Communications; beautiful music

Technical information
- Licensing authority: FCC
- Facility ID: 20346
- Class: C0
- ERP: 100,000 watts
- HAAT: 300 meters (980 ft)
- Transmitter coordinates: 29.920°N 90.025°W

Links
- Public license information: Public file; LMS
- Webcast: Listen live (via Audacy)
- Website: www.audacy.com/b97

WEZB (97.1 MHz, "B97 FM") is a commercial radio station licensed to New Orleans, Louisiana. Owned by Audacy, Inc., it broadcasts a contemporary hit radio format. The radio studios and offices are located at the 400 Poydras Tower in Downtown New Orleans. The station airs the syndicated The Kidd Kraddick Morning Show from KHKS Dallas on weekdays.

WEZB has an effective radiated power (ERP) of 100,000 watts. The transmitter site is off Behrman Highway in the city's Algiers neighborhood. WEZB broadcasts in the HD Radio hybrid format.

== History ==
On September 1, 1945, 97.1 signed on the air as WRCM, the FM simulcast of WJMR (990 AM; WGSO) and sister station to WJMR-TV (now WVUE), all owned by George J. Mayoral. Then, around 1966–67 after the TV station had already been sold, the Supreme Broadcasting Company bought the two radio stations and changed the call signs to WNNR and WNNR-FM. At the time, the stations were located in the Jung Hotel at 1500 Canal Street in downtown New Orleans. WNNR-FM had a power of only 20,500 watts from an antenna 310 feet atop the building, a fraction of its current wattage and antenna height.

On January 2, 1972, EZ Communications acquired the FM station. It became WEZB, part of a chain of beautiful music stations such as WEZC Charlotte, WEZR Washington and others owned by EZ. While it was profitable, it was not able to best WWL-FM (now WLMG) in the easy listening format. Briefly in the 1970s when disco music became a popular genre, 97.1 became "Disco 97 FM" on February 8, 1979. However, the disco era was short, with WEZB switching to a rhythmic contemporary format, called FM 97, The Rhythm Of The City. "We had a big party in the Atrium at the Hyatt Regency Hotel", says Jimmy Roberts, B97 FM's first "BJ", the station's version of a DJ. On January 1, 1980, "Baby New Year was dropped from the ceiling and we switched over from being FM 97, The Rhythm Of The City to The New B97 FM."

According to Jackson "Jack Da Wack" Tally, who was also one of B97 FM's first Bee Jocks, in early November 1979, the station slowly started to work more Top 40 music into the playlist and scaled back the rhythmic titles. By the end of that year, the staff was ready for the format change to B97 FM. This station would be a popular Top 40 outlet for years to come, much like "The Mighty 690, WTIX" was in the 1960s and 1970s.

Kent Burkhart, consultant to EZ Communications at the time, states on his website that Dan Vallie was hired on by the company to change the ailing format of WEZB from disco and dance music to Top 40. Bob Reich and Dan Vallie brought in Ken Cooper to do mornings and re-named him Cajun Ken Cooper telling listeners he lived in the "Cooper Dome" One of Cooper's best caricatures was "The Right Reverend Shamus On You" representing "The First Church of the Sacred Gumbo" The New B-97 FM with all the great B-Jocks went to number 1 within a year. Over the years, the name went through minor changes (i.e., "The New B97 FM", "New Orleans' B97 FM", "B97 FM", "97.1 The All New B-97 FM", and "B97 FM, All The Hits!"), the transmitting power was increased, and the antenna was moved to a taller location.

B97 has been New Orleans' top-rated Top 40 outlet for more than 40 years, except for two brief, failed experiments. The first format change was a decision by now-defunct EZ Communications, in which the station changed to a hot talk format in August 1995. It featured The Howard Stern Show and other edgy talk programs. The decision to return to a music format came in Spring of 1996. On June 7, 1996, the station stunted by playing Billy Ray Cyrus' "Achy Breaky Heart" repeatedly for seven hours. At noon that day, the station launched a hot adult contemporary/adult Top 40 format using the same name "B97 FM." The first song was Hootie & the Blowfish's "Only Wanna Be With You". On July 26, 1998, WEZB returned to its heritage Top 40/CHR format, albeit with a rhythmic lean. In 2002, it returned to its current, mainstream Top 40 approach.

Ownership would change hands on three occasions in the late 1990s, first with EZ Communications selling the station to Heritage Media. News Corporation acquired Heritage Media in 1997 and spun off its broadcast holdings to Sinclair Broadcast Group. Finally, in 1999, Sinclair would sell WEZB and 45 other radio stations to Entercom for $824.5 million. Entercom changed its name to Audacy, Inc. following the acquisition of CBS Radio.

Previous logo

== Hurricane Katrina ==
WEZB was also a member of the United Radio Broadcasters of New Orleans, an alliance of broadcast stations formed by the joint ventures of WEZB's parent company, Entercom Communications with Clear Channel Communications, during Hurricane Katrina in September 2005.

== Past programming and staff ==
Notable former programs include The Howard Stern Show. Notable former on-air personalities include program director Elvis Duran and sports reporter Bernard "Buddy" Diliberto.
