= WSMB =

WSMB may refer to:

- WSMB (FM), a radio station (89.3 FM) licensed to serve Harbor Beach, Michigan, United States
- WMFS (AM), a radio station (680 AM) licensed to serve Memphis, Tennessee, United States, which held the call sign WSMB from 2006 to 2009
- WWWL, New Orleans radio station formerly with call letters WSMB.
