= KLXH =

K-Love radio station in Thibodaux, Louisiana

- Thibodaux, Louisiana; United States
- Broadcast area: Houma–Thibodaux
- Frequency: 106.3 MHz
- Branding: K-Love

Programming
- Network: K-Love

Ownership
- Owner: Educational Media Foundation

History
- First air date: June 1, 1966
- Former call signs: KTIB-FM (1966–1973); KXOR-FM (1973–2017)

Technical information
- Licensing authority: FCC
- Facility ID: 35989
- Class: C3
- ERP: 25,000 watts
- HAAT: 100 meters (330 ft)
- Transmitter coordinates: 29°38′52.00″N 90°41′34.00″W

Links
- Public license information: Public file; LMS
- Website: K-Love

KLXH (106.3 FM) is a radio station licensed to Thibodaux, Louisiana, United States. The station is currently owned by Educational Media Foundation.

The station serves the Houma/Thibodaux metropolitan area of Southeastern Louisiana

== History ==
This station was started on June 1, 1966, by the Delta Broadcasting Company as KTIB-FM, a 3,000-watt sister station to KTIB AM. The station was sold in 1973 to Joseph Costello III, owner at the time of WRNO-FM and later on WRNO worldwide who switched the callsign to KXOR and formatted the station in his years of ownership as a rock station, and lastly as a country station branded as "LA Country 106" before being sold upon his death to Guaranty Broadcasting of Baton Rouge in 1997 who promptly flipped the format to classic rock branded as "Eagle 106.3" so as not to compete with sister station KCIL . The station was sold as part of a cluster of stations in 2006 to Sunburst Media-Louisiana LLC. which updated the playlist to include newer rock than previously heard transforming the station into a Mainstream rock format. In November 2009, the radio company brought in Los Angeles radio consultant and music producer "Mighty Mike Quinn" who took over as Vice President of Programming. In late 2010 Mighty Mike Quinn's contract ended and he returned with his fiancé (Model and Radio Host) Viny Star back to Santa Monica, California. On March 1, 2011 KXOR-FM changed their format to classic rock, branded as "LA 106.3 Rock Hits Radio". Effective November 11, 2015, KXOR-FM (along with co-owned KCIL and KJIN) was sold to James Anderson's My Home Team Media, LLC.

On May 26, 2017, KXOR-FM changed their call letters to KLXH, as Educational Media Foundation closed on its $525,000 purchase of KXOR-FM. The station went silent on May 31, 2017 in preparation of switching to EMF's "K-Love" contemporary Christian format; it returned in June.
