= KTIB =

Radio station in Thibodaux, Louisiana

- Thibodaux, Louisiana; United States
- Broadcast area: Houma–Thibodaux
- Frequency: 640 kHz
- Branding: La Calle 97.9

Programming
- Format: Spanish-language Contemporary Hits
- Affiliations: Premiere Networks

Ownership
- Owner: Gap Broadcasting LLC
- Operator: FC New Orleans Inc.

History
- First air date: December 24, 1953
- Call sign meaning: Thibodaux

Technical information
- Licensing authority: FCC
- Facility ID: 36183
- Class: B
- Power: 5,000 watts (day); 1,000 watts (night)
- Transmitter coordinates: 29°51′05.00″N 90°54′48.00″W
- Translators: 97.9 K250BA (New Orleans); 103.7 K279CU (Thibodaux)

Links
- Public license information: Public file; LMS
- Website: lacalle979.com

KTIB (640 AM, "La Calle 97.9") is a commercial radio station in Thibodaux, Louisiana. It airs a Spanish-language Contemporary Hits radio format and is owned by Gap Broadcasting. With a good radio, the AM station can be heard as far as east as New Orleans, far as north as Baton Rouge, far as west as New Iberia, and as far south as the Gulf of Mexico.

KTIB transmits with 5,000 watts by day. But at night, when radio waves travel farther, it drops to 1,000 watts to avoid interfering with other stations on AM 640, a clear channel frequency. It uses a directional antenna at all times. KTIB is also simulcast on 250-watt FM translators K250BA at 97.9 MHz in New Orleans and on K279CU in Thibodaux. The station can also be heard on the iHeartRadio platform.

== History ==
KTIB signed on the air on December 24, 1953. It was owned by a group of calling themselves Delta Broadcasting. Originally it was a daytimer with a power of 500 watts, broadcasting on 630 kHz, but required to go off the air at night. In 1966, a sister station was added at 106.3, KTIB-FM (today’s KLXH).

In 1973, both stations were sold to separate owners. The AM station was bought by a group calling themselves LaTerr Broadcasting, installing a full service country music format. In 1986, the station upgraded to new facilities and moved to the present frequency of 640 kHz, getting authorization to broadcast around the clock.

In 1989, the station flipped to an adult standards format. In the 1990s, it moved to an oldies format. The station was sold in 1999 to Delta Starr broadcasting which switched to a talk format with sports on the weekends.

In 2005, the station was taken dark by one of the three owners claiming it was unable to pay its bills. Lawsuits were filed claiming mismanagement by one of the partners of LaTerr Broadcasting, and the station was ultimately put into bankruptcy protection. It was sold by the Chapter 7 Bankruptcy court to Gap Broadcasting LLC (A Florida LLC) in late 2006. Gap Broadcasting returned the station to the air in February 2007 with a format of oldies and talk.

Gap Broadcasting LLC was incorporated as a Florida Limited Liability Corporation but is owned locally by George Laughlin. He is also in charge of an investor led Gap Broadcasting LLC which was incorporated in Delaware and owns many stations bought from Clear Channel Communications.

The station in February 2010 flipped from oldies to a variety hits format, using the slogan "The Balcony- Music We Like." A few years later, the station returned to oldies, with some talk shows included.

On May 11, 2017 KTIB changed to Hot Adult Contemporary, branded as "Lagniappe 103.7," simulcast on FM translator K279CU at 103.7 FM Thibodaux.

On April 20, 2022, FC New Orleans Inc. began operating KTIB through a time brokerage agreement. It began airing a Spanish Contemporary Hits format, feeding FM translator K250BA in New Orleans as "97.9 La Calle" while still on the Thibodaux translator as well.

== Logo history ==
Logos used during the Hot AC and Oldies eras:

== See also ==
- KTIB Radio Building
