= WADU =

WADU may refer to:

- KGLA (AM), a radio station (830 AM) licensed to Norco, Louisiana, which held the call sign WADU from 1985 to 1996
- WGUO, a radio station (94.9 FM) licensed to Reserve, Louisiana, which held the call sign WADU-FM from 1991 to 2000
- Wudu, an Islamic ablution
