= KDLC (FM) =

- Dulac, Louisiana; United States
- Broadcast area: Houma–Thibodaux
- Frequency: 97.7 MHz
- Branding: Rock 97.7

Programming
- Language: English
- Format: Classic rock

Ownership
- Owner: Bayou Radio Group
- Sister stations: KCIL, KJIN, WGUO

History
- First air date: 2011; 15 years ago
- Call sign meaning: K DuLaC

Technical information
- Licensing authority: FCC
- Facility ID: 189558
- Class: C1
- ERP: 100,000 watts
- HAAT: 134.4 meters (441 ft)

Links
- Public license information: Public file; LMS
- Webcast: Listen Live
- Website: rock977.net

KDLC (97.7 FM, "Rock 97.7") is a classic rock radio station licensed to Dulac, Louisiana. It serves the Houma, Louisiana area and is owned by Coast Radio Group.

== History ==
In 2011, KDLC signed in the air with an adult contemporary format branded as "Sunny 97.7".

On June 1, 2017, KDLC changed their format from adult contemporary (branded as "Sunny 97.7") to classic rock, branded as "Rock 97.7".
