= WHII =

WHII may refer to:

- WHII-LP, a low-power radio station (106.5 FM) licensed to serve Warminster, Pennsylvania, United States
- WIZK, a radio station (1570 AM) licensed to serve Bay Springs, Mississippi, United States, which held the call sign WHII until 1987
