= WWL (AM) =

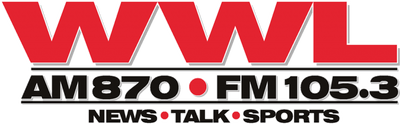
- New Orleans, Louisiana; United States
- Broadcast area: New Orleans metropolitan area
- Frequency: 870 kHz
- Branding: The Big 870

Programming
- Format: news/talk; sports radio
- Affiliations: ABC News Radio; WWL-TV; LSU Tigers; New Orleans Pelicans; New Orleans Saints; Westwood One Sports

Ownership
- Owner: Audacy, Inc.; (Audacy License, LLC)
- Sister stations: WEZB; WKBU; WLMG; WWL-FM; WWWL

History
- First air date: March 31, 1922

Technical information
- Licensing authority: FCC
- Facility ID: 34377
- Class: A (clear channel station)
- Power: 50,000 watts
- Transmitter coordinates: 29°50′14.75″N 90°7′55.27″W (main); 29°55′27.7″N 90°2′4.3″W (aux)
- Repeater: 105.3 WWL-FM (Kenner)

Links
- Public license information: Public file; LMS
- Webcast: Listen live (via Audacy)
- Website: www.audacy.com/wwl

WWL (870 kHz) is an commercial AM radio station in New Orleans, Louisiana, owned by Audacy, Inc. WWL and 105.3 WWL-FM simulcast a news/talk radio format with sports talk at night. The station's studios are in the 400 Poydras Tower in the New Orleans Central Business District. On January 7, 2024, Audacy filed a chapter 11 plan for bankruptcy with almost $2 billion of debt.

WWL is a clear-channel, Class A station. Its transmitter power output is 50,000 watts, the maximum for commercial AM stations in the U.S. It uses a directional antenna with a two-tower array. The transmitter is in the Jean Lafitte National Historical Park in Estelle, Louisiana. The daytime signal provides at least secondary coverage to large parts of the Gulf Coast, with city-grade coverage reaching as far east as Pensacola, Florida, and as far west as Lafayette, Louisiana. At night it can be heard across much of the central and southern United States.

WWL is the Louisiana Primary Entry Point for the Emergency Alert System (EAS). With sister station 101.9 WLMG, it is responsible for activation of the Southeast Louisiana EAS plan.

== Programming ==
=== News and talk ===
The weekday schedule features news and talk programming mornings and early afternoons, shifting to sports talk and live play-by-play after 4 pm. All weekday programming from 5 am to 8 pm is hosted by local WWL personalities and reporters. The only nationally syndicated programs are Westwood One Sports shows at 8 pm, family finances expert Dave Ramsey at 1 am and This Morning, America's First News with Gordon Deal, at 4 am.

Weekend programming includes shows on money, law, gardening, home improvement and the outdoors before sports takes over the schedule. WWL is a long-time affiliate of the CBS Radio Network. Most hours on weekdays begin with local newscasts branded as WWL First News, while CBS News begins most hours nights and weekends.

=== Sports ===
Sports shows begin during afternoon drive time, hosted by former NFL quarterback Bobby Hebert. WWL-AM-FM are part-time Westwood One Sports affiliates. Programming from that network is heard in late evenings, and in several blocks during the day on weekends. When two live sporting events occur at the same time, one of the games moves to sister station WWWL, which airs a mostly sports format.

For many years, WWL has been the flagship station for broadcasts of New Orleans Saints football games, continuously since the 1995 season. WWL-AM-FM continue to be the lead stations on the New Orleans Saints Radio Network, with affiliates in Louisiana, Mississippi and three other states.

WWL-AM-FM are also the flagships for New Orleans Pelicans basketball broadcasts. The team had been with KLRZ for five years leading up to 2024. With the 2024–25 season, team broadcasts returned to WWL-AM-FM.

WWL-AM-FM serve as the New Orleans outlet of the LSU Tigers, simulcasting all football games, while some men's basketball and baseball games are also heard. It shares flagship status with WDGL in Baton Rouge. WWL was previously the radio home of the Tulane Green Wave.

== History ==
=== Early years ===
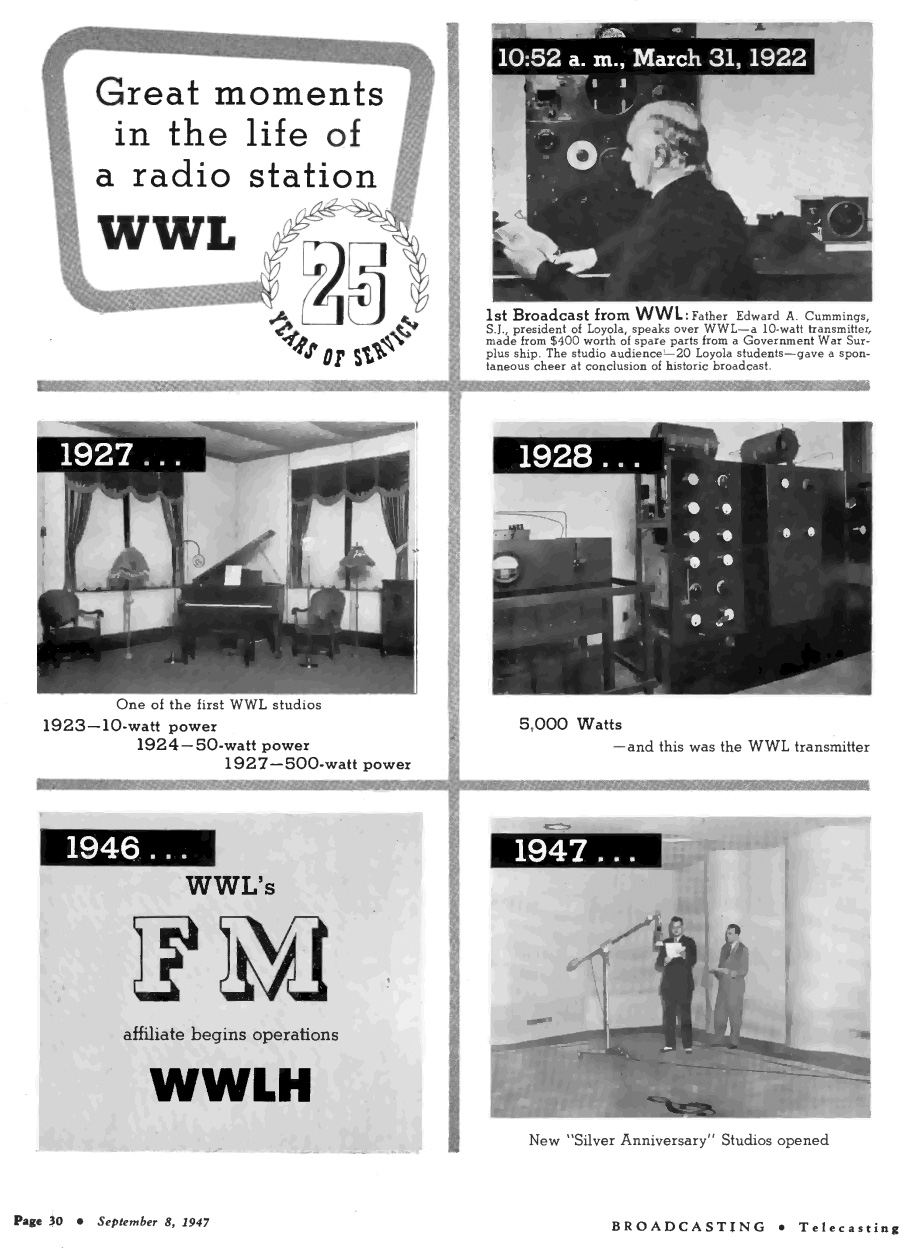
1947 advertisement commemorating WWL's 25th anniversary.

Effective December 1, 1921, the Department of Commerce, which controlled radio at the time, adopted regulations formally establishing a broadcasting station category. It set aside the wavelength of 360 meters (833 kHz) for entertainment broadcasts, and 485 meters (619 kHz) for farm market and weather reports.

On March 31, 1922, Loyola University in New Orleans was issued a "Limited Commercial License" for a new station on the 360-meter "entertainment" wavelength. WWL was the second broadcasting station licensed in Louisiana, following WGV, also in New Orleans, licensed 10 days earlier. However, WWL was the first station in the state to begin broadcasting operations.

=== Loyola University ===
Starting before World War I and continuing until June 1922, the university sponsored a radio training school, with both civilian and military students. WWL's initial equipment was installed at Marquette Hall on the Loyola campus, with construction performed by Edward T. Cassidy, a Jesuit seminarian and physicist serving as the head of the radio school, and L. J. N. "Joe" du Treil, a former school head who worked at the Commerce Department's New Orleans district office of its Radio Service section.

WWL received a telegraphed broadcasting station authorization, and signed on the air, on March 31, 1922. It initially broadcast on the shared 360-meter entertainment wavelength, as a 10-watt station. The station's debut purpose was to promote a university fundraising project. Loyola president Father Edward Cummings opened the first half-hour broadcast with a three-minute fundraising plea on behalf of the university's building drive, stating that "We are organizing the radio operators in the state to spread the story of Loyola's needs. Will you lend your support to our campaign, both by radio and individual effort which will aid us in making Loyola University one of the greatest institutions of learning in the Southland?" This was followed by Tulane University's Guiseppe Ferrate playing an original piano composition.

=== Frequency changes ===
In mid-1923, the station was reassigned to 1070 kHz. That was changed to 1090 kHz in early 1925. It switched to 1220 kHz in late 1927. On November 11, 1928, under the provisions of the Federal Radio Commission's General Order 40, WWL was assigned to 850 kHz, on a shared basis with KWKH in Shreveport. As part of the equal distribution standards mandated by the Davis Amendment, each of five regions had been allocated eight high-powered "clear channel" frequencies, which were granted dominant and widespread nighttime coverage. 850 kHz was one of the frequencies assigned to "Region 3", consisting of states in the southeastern United States. WWL's power was increased to 5,000 watts on March 31, 1929, following the installation of a new transmitter in Bobet Hall.

In 1929, Loyola University decided that WWL would include commercial operations, with the station profits providing an endowment for the university. Loyola is owned and operated by Catholic priests belonging to the Society of Jesus, commonly known as "Jesuits". There was concern that commercial operation might violate both Catholic and Jesuit prohibitions on priests operating businesses. However, a decision was made that the station's non-religious programming and advertising had an existing analogy in church-run efforts, such as publications, which had content that included advertising. In addition, a separate holding company, WWL Development, was formed to run the station, with the provision its profits would be transferred to Loyola.

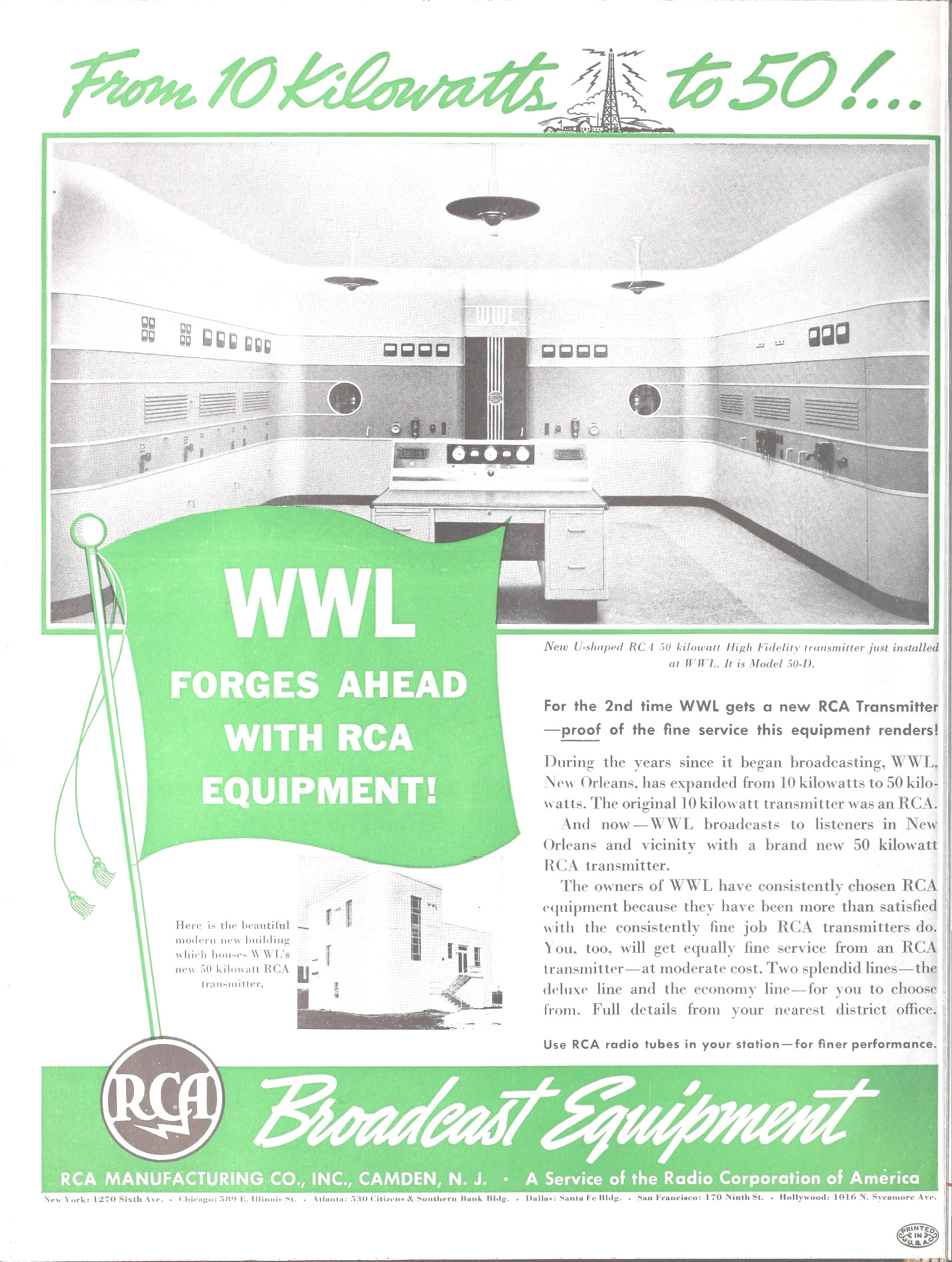
WWL has operated with 50,000 watts since 1938.

In 1932, the station upgraded to 10,000 watts, with new studios in the Roosevelt Hotel. In 1934, WWL's contentious application to gain fulltime use of 850 kHz was granted, which resulted in its timeshare partner, KWKH, being moved to 1100 kHz. WWL's attainment of fulltime operations made the station attractive to the national radio networks, and it began an affiliation with the CBS Radio Network on November 1, 1935, which had been previously held by WDSU. This also greatly increased the profits being transferred to the university.

=== 50,000 watts ===
On November 30, 1938, WWL formally dedicated a power increase to 50,000 watts. On March 29, 1941, with the implementation of the North American Regional Broadcasting Agreement (NARBA), stations on 850 kHz, including WWL, moved to 870 kHz.

In the 1940s, 1950s, and 1960s, the station was famous for the live broadcasts of local Dixieland jazz bands. Some jazz performers heard on WWL included Louis Armstrong, Papa Celestin, Sharkey Bonano, Irving Fazola, Tony Almarico, and Lizzie Miles.

=== TV and FM stations ===
An FM companion station, WWLH at 100.3 MHz, debuted on September 11, 1946, but ended operations on February 28, 1951. Station management stated, "We have been unsuccessful in establishing in New Orleans a sufficient audience of FM listeners to justify continued operation." A television partner WWL-TV came on the air on September 7, 1957, which was also affiliated with CBS. A new FM companion station, WWL-FM at 101.9 MHz (now WLMG), debuted on March 15, 1970, with its own music format.

WWL was mentioned in an opening scene of "The Swan Bed" (October 21, 1960) episode of the Route 66 TV series. Main characters Todd and Buzz (Martin Milner and George Maharis) turn on the car's radio as they are driving across the Greater New Orleans Bridge and hear the callsign WWL announced.

Starting on March 14, 1971, WWL was home to a long-running overnight country music program aimed at truck drivers called The Road Gang. It used the slogan "Interstate 87", and offered weather forecasts in major cities along the east-west interstates I-10, I-20, I-30, etc. Advertising was focused on long-haul truckers. It was originally hosted by Charlie Douglas. Later hosts included Dave Nemo and Big John Parker. The station also helped popularize Southern Gospel by late-night broadcasts of the Mull Singing Convention.

WWL's transmitter site was moved from Kenner, Louisiana, on the south shore of Lake Pontchartrain, to Estelle, Louisiana, in 1975.

=== New Orleans Saints ===
WWL has been the radio home of the New Orleans Saints football team for most of its history. WWL is the long-time flagship station for the New Orleans Saints Radio Network. Jim Henderson and ex-Saint Hokie Gajan were the broadcast team from 2000, until Gajan's death from cancer on April 11, 2016. Prior to the 1998 NFL draft, when son Peyton Manning was drafted by the Indianapolis Colts, Archie Manning provided commentary on WWL's Saints coverage from his retirement as a player in 1985 through 1997.

Former Saint Deuce McAllister succeeded Gajan as Henderson's color commentator in 2016. Longtime Saints offensive tackle Stan Brock was Henderson's commentator in 1998 and 1999.

=== Changes in ownership ===
Loyola sold WWL, WLMG, and WWL-TV to separate companies in 1989. The sales price helped to build the university's endowment. That same year, the university began operating carrier current station "WLDC". Using the electrical grid as an antenna, this station's power was low enough to be limited to campus reception, so it did not need an FCC license. It was subsequently replaced by Crescent City Radio, an internet radio station broadcasting from the Communications/Music Complex on the corner of Calhoun and Saint Charles Avenue.

Keymarket Communications of Greenville, South Carolina, became the new owner of WWL and WLMG. Baltimore-based Sinclair Broadcast Group assumed ownership of both stations in 1996. Most of Sinclair's radio stations, including WWL and WLMG, were acquired by Entercom Communications of Bala Cynwyd, Pennsylvania in 1999.

WWL has been "monogrammed" into the Internal Revenue Code. A section excluding certain types of income of nonprofit organizations from income tax mentions entities licensed by federal agencies (like the station's FCC license) and carried on by religious orders (like the Jesuits). The three subsections of this tax provision, 26 U.S.C. 512(b)(15), begin with W, W, and L, respectively. The exclusion was directed at WWL specifically, and the joke has been attributed to Senator Russell Long of Louisiana.

In April 2006, WWL programming returned to the FM band, via simulcasting on WWL-FM 105.3. The station was previously hot adult contemporary WKZN "105.3 The Zone". In the months after Hurricane Katrina, Entercom decided WWL's important news programming should also be heard on the FM dial.

=== Hurricanes Katrina and Ida ===
Hurricane Katrina hit New Orleans and the Gulf Coast in late August 2005. WWL was for a time one of the few radio stations in the area remaining on the air. Announcer Garland Robinette continued broadcasting from an improvised studio built in a closet after the real studio's windows were blown out.

WWL's emergency round-the-clock coverage was simulcast on the frequencies of numerous other radio stations. The broadcast was named "The United Radio Broadcasters of New Orleans". Mostly WWL staff were heard on-air. The United Radio Broadcasters were a partnership between Entercom (now Audacy, Inc.) and competitor Clear Channel Communications (now iHeartMedia). The WWL website was completely rebuilt in only one day by the staff of Entercom stations in other cities.

The company also dispatched staffers from stations throughout the country to help WWL, and to provide their own stations coverage from the hurricane ravaged New Orleans area. For some time after Hurricane Katrina, WWL was simulcast on shortwave outlet WHRI, owned by World Harvest Radio International.

When Hurricane Ida hit New Orleans in 2021, WWL was ready from what it learned 16 years earlier. It simulcast its Hurricane Ida coverage on all of its Audacy sister stations in the New Orleans cluster.

== See also ==
- List of initial AM-band station grants in the United States
- List of three-letter broadcast call signs in the United States
