= KTOC-FM =

- Jonesboro, Louisiana; United States
- Broadcast area: Ruston, Louisiana
- Frequency: 104.9 MHz

Programming
- Language: English
- Format: Religious

Ownership
- Owner: Family Worship Center Church, Inc.

History
- First air date: July 13, 2005; 21 years ago

Technical information
- Licensing authority: FCC
- Facility ID: 15064
- Class: C3
- Power: 25,000 Watts
- HAAT: 72
- Transmitter coordinates: 32°13′28.60″N 92°43′27.50″W

Links
- Public license information: Public file; LMS
- Webcast: Listen live
- Website: http://sonlifetv.com

KTOC-FM (104.9 MHz) is an American radio station broadcasting a religious format. Licensed to Jonesboro, Louisiana, United States, the station serves Ruston, Louisiana.

== Translator ==
- 94.3 - K232FN - Many, Louisiana

== See also ==
- KRLQ: also licensed to Jackson Parish
