= WWWL =

- New Orleans, Louisiana; United States
- Broadcast area: New Orleans metropolitan area
- Frequency: 1350 kHz
- Branding: The Bet New Orleans

Programming
- Language: English
- Format: Sports gambling
- Affiliations: BetMGM Network; Westwood One Sports

Ownership
- Owner: Audacy, Inc.; (Audacy License, LLC)
- Sister stations: WEZB; WKBU; WLMG; WWL; WWL-FM

History
- First air date: April 1, 1925; 101 years ago
- Former call signs: WSMB (1925–2006)
- Call sign meaning: WWL (sister station)

Technical information
- Licensing authority: FCC
- Facility ID: 72959
- Class: B
- Power: 5,000 watts (day); 480 watts (night)
- Transmitter coordinates: 29°55′29.74″N 90°2′4.25″W
- Translator: 92.9 W225CZ (New Orleans)

Links
- Public license information: Public file; LMS
- Webcast: Listen live (via Audacy)
- Website: www.audacy.com/thebetneworleans

WWWL (1350 AM, "The Bet New Orleans") is a commercial radio station in New Orleans, Louisiana. Owned by Audacy, Inc., it broadcasts a sports gambling format. The station's studios are located at the 400 Poydras Tower in Downtown New Orleans. Its transmitter site is in Algiers, near the city limits of Gretna and Terrytown. The station operates at 5,000 watts during the day and 480 watts at night, using a non-directional antenna. The station is simulcast on FM translator station W225CZ (92.9 FM).

== History ==
=== Early years ===
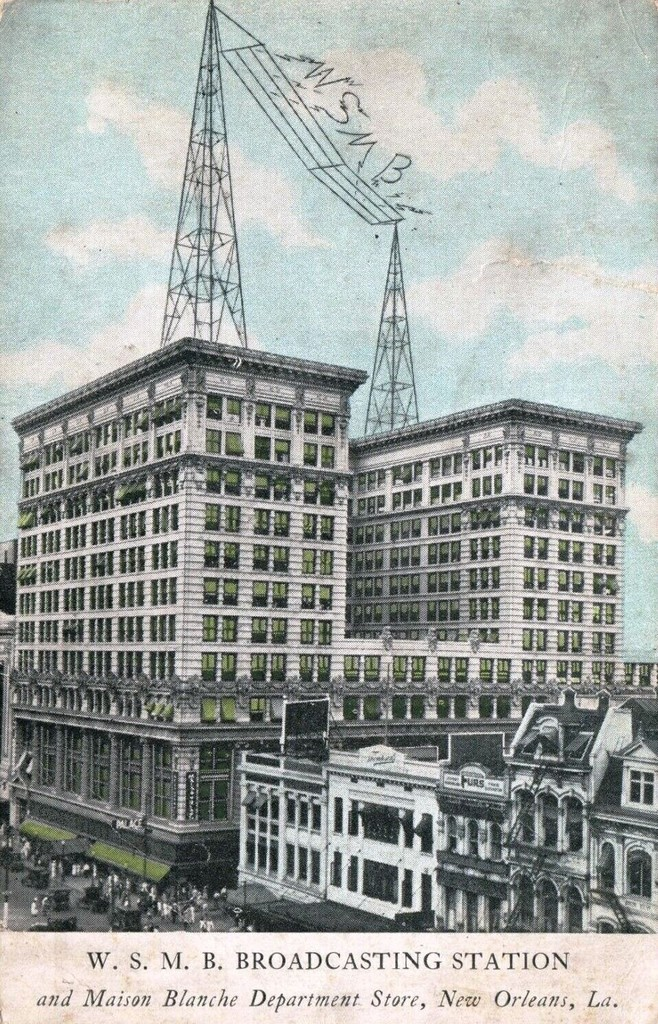
WSMB broadcast towers atop the Maison Blanche building, mid 1920s.

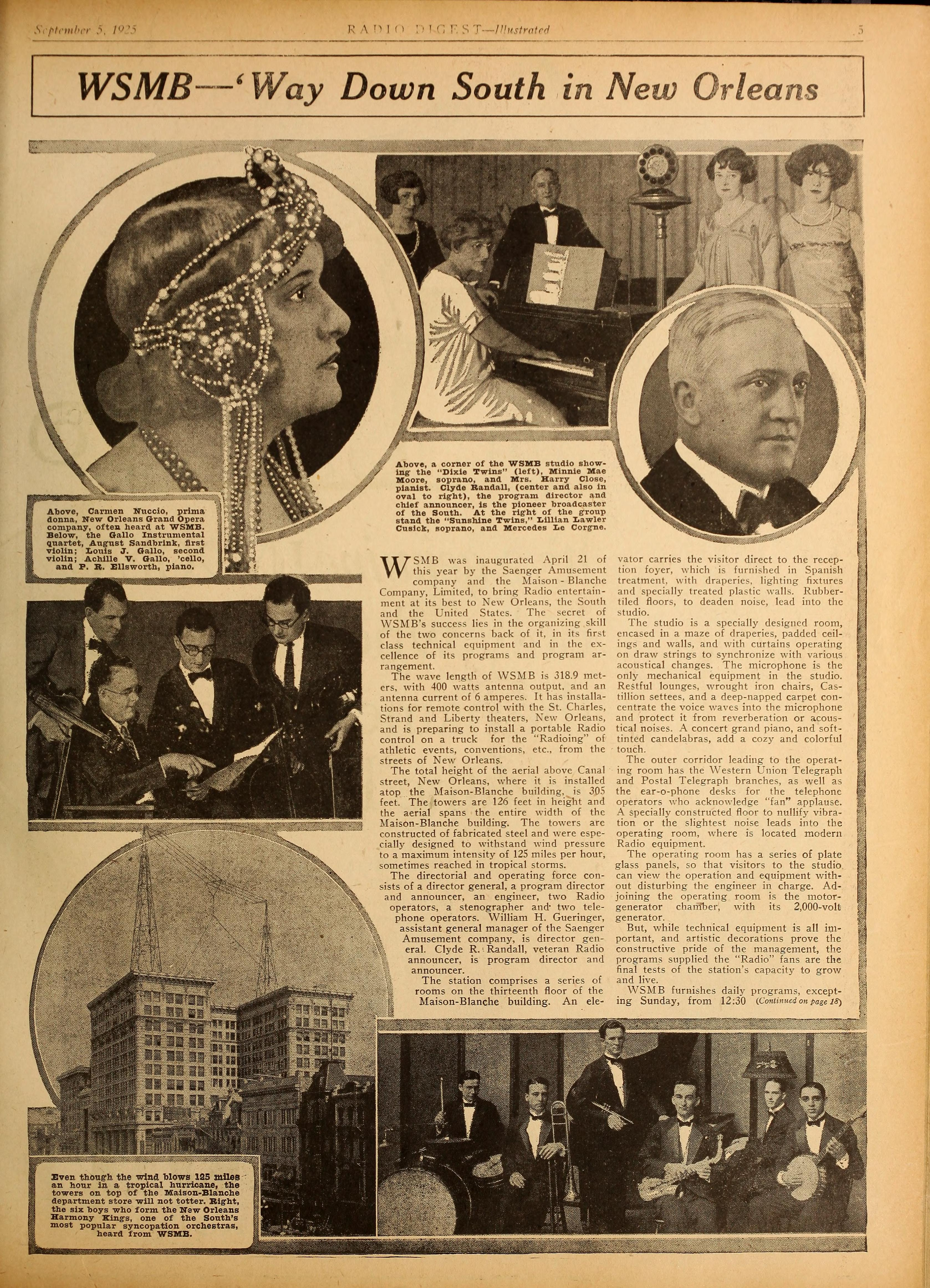
Some of WSMB's live on air talent, September 1925

This station carried the call sign WSMB from its founding until 2006. It signed on the airwaves April 1, 1925, as New Orleans' first professional radio station, a joint commercial venture by the local Saenger Theatre and the Maison Blanche department store. Programming was provided by the Saenger, allowing Maison Blanche to sell radio sets in the store so customers could hear the station's programming. For most of its early history, the studios were located on the thirteenth floor of the Maison Blanche Building on Canal Street, a few blocks from the theater. By the 1930s, WSMB was an affiliate of the NBC Red Network, carrying its schedule of dramas, comedies, news, sports, soap operas, game shows and big band broadcasts during the Golden Age of Radio.

=== Switch to MOR and talk ===
As network programming shifted to TV in the 1960s, WSMB moved to a full service format of middle of the road music (MOR), news and talk. WSMB found success in the ratings, primarily on the strength of morning drive time personalities Roy Roberts and Jeff Hugg, known as Nut and Jeff, and midday political talk show host, Keith Rush. Musically, the station in the 1960s was a mix of pop standards and the softer sounds of rock and roll. In the 1970s, WSMB moved to a more adult contemporary music sound. The station played moderate amounts of music during morning and afternoon drive times while being music intensive and leaning toward oldies overnights and weekends.

By 1980, as music listening shifted to FM, WSMB's ratings had dropped. The station gradually cut back on music through the early 1980s. By 1985, WSMB was strictly news and talk, using the ABC Radio Information Network and its Talk Radio service. Moving to all talk still did not bring ratings up. In 1988, WSMB was sold to Winton Communications, which kept the talk format in place but could not improve the ratings.

=== Move to all-talk and sports ===
In 1996, WSMB was bought by the Sinclair Broadcast Group, which also owned the news-talk powerhouse 870 WWL. Sinclair turned WSMB into a sister station of WWL, running talk programs that were not available on AM 870, and adding WWL's newsgathering expertise. In 1999, Sinclair sold its New Orleans radio stations to Entercom. WWWL began broadcasting sporting events that were bumped from WWL due to scheduling conflicts, including basketball and football from LSU and Tulane University. The station was the radio home of the New Orleans Brass minor league hockey team from 1997 to 2002 and has sometimes been a local radio outlet for national broadcasts of NFL football.

With all the sporting events on WSMB's schedule, it became an all-sports station between 1999 and 2001. Programming at that time included syndicated shows from ESPN Radio and an afternoon show hosted by local sports commentator Kaare Johnson. Other local personalities heard on the station included sports trainer Mackie Shilstone. There was a period where most programming consisted of psychological call-in shows, featuring hosts such as Dr. Laura and Dr. Joy Browne. From 2005 until November 2006, the station carried a progressive talk radio format as an affiliate of Air America Radio. The Food Show with Tom Fitzmorris remained on the air through all these format changes. It is the longest-running talk show of any kind in New Orleans, airing weekdays since July 18, 1988, and now heard on WWL-FM HD2 or in podcast format.

=== Hurricane Katrina ===
The station's previous studios adjacent to the Louisiana Superdome were destroyed in August 2005 by Hurricane Katrina. Its frequency, as well as all other operational Entercom and Clear Channel frequencies, was used to simulcast the programming produced by the United Radio Broadcasters of New Orleans with the staff of sister station WWL. Normal programming was resumed on December 19, 2005.

=== Change to WWWL ===
The WSMB call letters were relinquished in November 2006, when the programming was switched to repeats of shows originated on WWL, becoming "WWWL - WWL On Demand". The WSMB call sign was picked up by another Entercom station located in Memphis (which became WMFS in 2009).

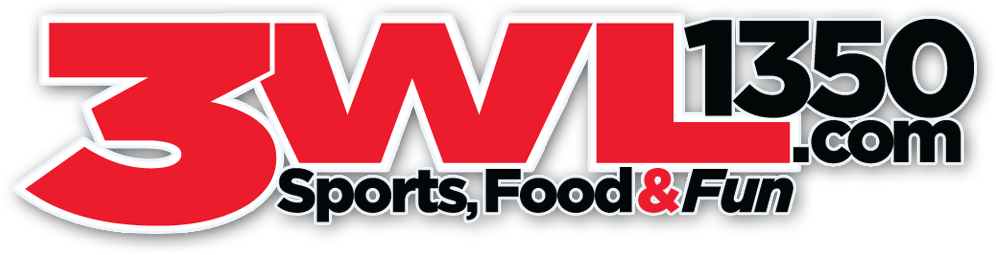
logo as "3WL" from 2013 to 2017

On June 30, 2008, ESPN Radio returned to AM 1350, as WWWL became a full-time affiliate. On October 14, 2013, WWWL re-branded as 3WL: Sports, Food & Fun; the format would continue to primarily feature sports programming, switching to NBC Sports Radio and featuring a morning show with T-Bob Hebert and Kristian Garic, but with an afternoon lineup featuring lifestyle programming such as Tom Fitzmorris' The Food Show, and John "Spud" McConnell moving from WWL midday to host afternoon drive.

On February 9, 2017, WWWL began running announcements redirecting 3WL listeners to WWL-FM-HD2, where the format would be moving full-time. The next day at noon, WWWL flipped to urban adult contemporary as "Hot 103.7", using new FM translator W279DF to enable its signal to be heard with FM quality. The first song on "Hot" was "Rude Boy" by Rihanna. The new format competes with market-leading WYLD-FM and KMEZ with a younger skewing take on the format, focusing solely on R&B hits from the 1990s through today, as opposed to the playlists of its two competitors, who include songs from the 1970s and 1980s.

Logo as "Hot 92.9 (2018–2021)

On February 14, 2018, WWWL flipped to an urban oldies format, but maintained the Hot branding and on-air staff. The station now focuses primarily on classic R&B from the 1970s and 1980s. On April 11, 2018, WWWL's FM translator W279DF was replaced by W225CZ, which operates from a taller antenna at 92.9 FM. At the same time, the station re-branded accordingly as Hot 92.9.

On June 28, 2021, WWWL/W225CZ flipped to sports gambling, branded as "The Bet New Orleans". The previous urban oldies format and "Hot" branding continued to air on WLMG-HD2.

== Translator ==
| Call sign | Frequency | City of license | FID | ERP (W) | Class | Transmitter coordinates | FCC info |
|---|---|---|---|---|---|---|---|
| W225CZ | 92.9 FM | New Orleans, Louisiana | 148534 | 250 | D | 29°55′12.7″N 90°1′28.3″W | LMS |
