= KCIL =

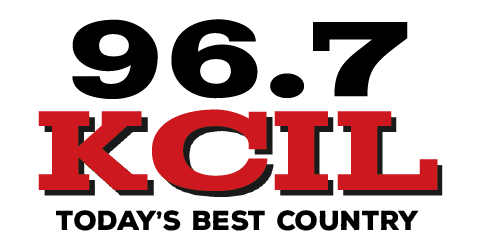
- Gray, Louisiana; United States
- Broadcast area: Houma–Thibodaux
- Frequency: 96.7 MHz

Programming
- Language: English
- Format: Country
- Affiliations: Nicholls Colonels

Ownership
- Owner: Bayou Radio Group
- Sister stations: KDLC, KJIN, WGUO

History
- First air date: August 1, 1967
- Former call signs: KMRC-FM (1967–1979); KFXY (1979–2000); KBZZ (2000–2007); KMYO-FM (2007–2011)

Technical information
- Licensing authority: FCC
- Facility ID: 67677
- Class: C2
- ERP: 50,000 watts
- HAAT: 105 meters (344 ft)
- Transmitter coordinates: 29°41′39″N 90°59′58″W

Links
- Public license information: Public file; LMS
- Website: 967kcil.com

KCIL (96.7 FM) is a broadcast radio station in the United States. Licensed to Gray, Louisiana, the station broadcasts a country music format to the Houma–Thibodaux area and is owned by Bayou Radio Group. KCIL also broadcasts Nicholls State University football.

The station first broadcast in 1967 with call sign KMRC-FM, as a contemporary hit radio station licensed to Morgan City. This format remained for nearly 35 years, until changes to adult contemporary in 2004, oldies in 2006, and then country in 2011 in a format and call sign swap. The station was part of the LSU Sports Radio Network in the early 2000s and early 2010s and the New Orleans Saints Radio Network in the early 2010s.

== History ==
=== As KMRC-FM (1967–1979) ===
The station was founded by Tri-City Broadcasting as KMRC-FM and was licensed to Morgan City; it signed on for the first time on August 1, 1967. KFXY was first licensed on December 26, 1967. KMRC-FM was initially a full simulcast of KMRC AM, a top 40 station in Morgan City.

=== As KFXY (1979–2000) ===
On July 30, 1979, KMRC-FM became KFXY. The station was branded "Foxy 96".

In 1995, Tiger Island Broadcasting bought KFXY for $196,300. Then in 1998, Guaranty Broadcasting of Houma bought KFXY and KMRC AM from Tiger Island Broadcasting for a combined $460,000.

Dating to the 2000 football season, KFXY was a member of the LSU Sports Radio Network.

=== As KBZZ (2000–2007) ===
On November 22, 2000, KFXY changed its call sign to KBZZ. Its brand changed to "96.7 the Buzz", while the format remained top 40. KBZZ also broadcast Morgan City High School football.

KBZZ's format changed from contemporary hits to adult contemporary in 2004, with brand "Soft Rock 96.7". KBZZ's final season in the LSU Sports Radio Network was also in 2004.

Sunburst Media reached an agreement in 2005 to buy KBZZ and three other stations from Guaranty for a total of $12.5 million. The license transfer to Sunburst was completed in June 2006.

=== As KMYO-FM (2007–2011) ===
On August 8, 2007, the call sign changed from KBZZ to KMYO-FM. Branded "Mix 96.7", KMYO-FM had an oldies format.

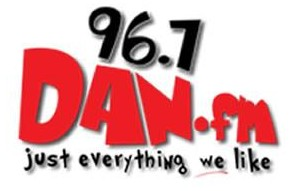
Logo as "96.7 Dan FM" from 2010 to 2011.

In 2010, the brand changed to "96.7 Dan FM".

=== As KCIL (2011–present) ===
The call sign became the station's present KCIL beginning May 2, 2011, in a swap with 107.5 in Jean Lafitte. Inheriting the country music format from 107.5, the new KCIL was branded "C 96.7". KCIL remained part of the New Orleans Saints Radio Network until 2014 and LSU Sports Radio Network until the 2013 football season and 2013–14 basketball season.

Beginning in 2025, KCIL began broadcasting Nicholls Colonels football games.

== Technical information ==
KCIL broadcasts with a class C2 signal and 50 kilowatts of effective radiated power both horizontally and vertically from a transmitter in Gibson near State Highway 182. Its broadcast signal has grade A coverage in Houma, Morgan City, and Thibodaux.
