= WWL-FM =

News/talk radio station in Kenner, Louisiana, United States

Simulcast with WWL, New Orleans
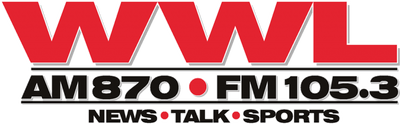
- Kenner, Louisiana; United States
- Broadcast area: New Orleans metropolitan area
- Frequency: 105.3 MHz (HD Radio)
- Branding: 105.3 WWL-FM

Programming
- Format: Talk radio with sports
- Subchannels: HD2: Sports–food–lifestyle
- Affiliations: ABC News Radio; WWL-TV; Westwood One Sports; LSU Tigers; New Orleans Pelicans; New Orleans Saints; Westwood One

Ownership
- Owner: Audacy, Inc.; (Audacy License, LLC)
- Sister stations: WEZB; WKBU; WLMG; WWL; WWWL

History
- First air date: September 8, 1970
- Former call signs: WVSL-FM (1970–1975); WXEL (1975–1981); WAIL (1981–1984); WLTS (1984); WLTS-FM (1984–2000); WKZN (2000–2005); WKBU (2005); WTKL (2005–2006)
- Call sign meaning: Taken from WWL

Technical information
- Licensing authority: FCC
- Facility ID: 52435
- Class: C1
- ERP: 96,000 watts
- HAAT: 306 meters (1,004 ft)
- Transmitter coordinates: 29°58′57.7″N 89°57′9.2″W

Links
- Public license information: Public file; LMS
- Webcast: Listen live (via Audacy); Listen live (via Audacy) (HD2)
- Website: www.audacy.com/wwl

WWL-FM (105.3 FM) is a commercial radio station licensed to Kenner, Louisiana, Louisiana, and serving the New Orleans metropolitan area. Owned by Audacy, Inc., WWL-FM and co-owned WWL (870 AM) jointly simulcast a talk and sports format, with studios and offices are in the 400 Poydras Tower in the New Orleans Central Business District.

WWL-FM's transmitter is sited off Paris Road in Chalmette, Louisiana. WWL-FM broadcasts in HD Radio; the HD2 digital subchannel carries both Westwood One Sports and shows on food and lifestyles.

== History ==
=== WVSL, WXEL, WAIL, WLTS, WKZN ===
On September 8, 1970, the station signed on the air as WVSL-FM in Slidell, Louisiana. It was owned by Bill Garrett Broadcasting, which also owned WBGS (1560 AM). In the late 1970s, the call sign for 105.3 was WXEL. In 1981, the station switched formats to rhythmic contemporary as WAIL.

The station was acquired in 1984 by Phase Two Broadcasting, which changed the call sign to WLTS, and flipped to a soft adult contemporary format. "Lite 105" spent 16 years in this format, although over time, the playlist shifted to a more uptempo, mainstream direction.

In 1999, the station was acquired by Entercom, its current owner. The city of license was changed from Slidell to Kenner, where Louis Armstrong New Orleans International Airport is located. During this time, the station evolved to a hot adult contemporary format as WKZN "105.3 The Zone".

=== Switch to WWL-FM ===
On August 29, 2005, the station's transmitter was severely damaged during Hurricane Katrina, knocking it off the air. It returned to broadcasting with low power as a temporary simulcast of co-owned WWL 870. Other FM stations in New Orleans suspended their music formats during the storm's aftermath to rebroadcast news from local TV stations.

In early October 2005, Entercom decided to switch two of its New Orleans FM station dial positions, with WTKL and WKBU exchanging frequencies. FM 105.3 became WTKL with a classic hits format and the "Kool" name, formerly "Kool 95.7". However, only three weeks later, it was decided by Entercom to scrap the classic hits format and return 105.3 to the WWL simulcast. Entercom cited positive listener response to WWL being heard on FM and complaints about its removal from the FM dial. Some listeners said they wanted WWL programming to remain on FM due to issues receiving the AM station in the New Orleans Central Business District. The "Kool 105.3" format continued as an Internet-only webcast for a short time after it was discontinued on FM.

With 105.3 simulcasting WWL, Entercom asked the Federal Communications Commission (FCC) to switch the call letters to WWL-FM. Sister station WLMG was the original home of the WWL-FM call sign, from 1970 to 1980, airing beautiful music at first, and then Top 40 hits.

== Programming ==
=== News and talk ===
The weekday schedule features news and talk programming mornings and early afternoons, shifting to sports talk and live play-by-play after 4 pm. All weekday programming from 5 a.m. to 8 p.m. is hosted by local WWL personalities and reporters. The only nationally syndicated programs are Infinity Sports Network shows at 8 pm, family finances expert Dave Ramsey at 1 a.m. and This Morning, America's First News with Gordon Deal, at 4 am.

WWL is a long-time affiliate of the CBS Radio Network. Most hours on weekdays begin with local newscasts branded as WWL First News, while CBS News begins most hours nights and weekends.

=== Sports ===
Sports shows begin during afternoon drive time, hosted by former NFL quarterback Bobby Herbert. WWL-AM-FM are part-time Infinity Sports Network affiliates. Programming from that network is heard in late evenings, and in several blocks during the day on weekends. When two live sporting events occur at the same time, one of the games moves to sister station WWWL, which airs a mostly sports format.

For many years, WWL has been the flagship station for broadcasts of New Orleans Saints football games, continuously since the 1995 season. WWL-AM-FM continue to be the lead stations on the New Orleans Saints Radio Network, with affiliates in Louisiana, Mississippi and three other states.

WWL-AM-FM are also the flagships for New Orleans Pelicans basketball broadcasts. The team had been with KLRZ for five years leading up to 2024. With the 2024-25 season, team broadcasts returned to WWL-AM-FM.

WWL-AM-FM serve as the New Orleans outlets of the LSU Tigers, simulcasting all football games, while some men's basketball and baseball games are also heard. WWL-AM-FM share flagship status with WDGL in Baton Rouge. WWL was previously the radio home of the Tulane Green Wave.

== See also ==
- List of three-letter broadcast call signs in the United States
