= KLEB =

- Golden Meadow, Louisiana; United States
- Broadcast area: Southern Lafourche Parish and Grand Isle, Louisiana
- Frequency: 1600 kHz
- Branding: The Rajun' Cajun

Programming
- Format: Swamp Pop, Cajun music, Zydeco

Ownership
- Owner: Coastal Broadcasting of Larose Inc.; ("Little Eagle Broadcasting")
- Sister stations: KANE, KLRZ

History
- First air date: August 16, 1963; 62 years ago

Technical information
- Licensing authority: FCC
- Facility ID: 8381
- Class: B
- Power: 720 watts (day); 60 watts (night)
- Transmitter coordinates: 29°23′43″N 90°16′1″W
- Translators: 102.7 K274DE Golden Meadow, Louisiana

Links
- Public license information: Public file; LMS
- Website: http://www.klrzfm.com/

KLEB (1600 AM "The Rajun' Cajun") is a radio station in Golden Meadow, Louisiana, broadcasting a mix of swamp pop and traditional cajun music. In September 2019, it began to simulcast on K274DE 102.7 MHz, which broadcasts from the KLRZ tower facilities in Larose and allows the station's listening audience to choose between AM or FM.

== History ==
KLEB was originally owned by the Egle family of Golden Meadow at its inception on August 16, 1963. The original owner was John A. Egle; Upon his death, his 5 children, Charlotte Heston, Richard Egle, Jan Harrison, John Egle and Don Egle inherited both KLEB AM and the FM station KZZQ in Galliano, which was automated. In the 1980s, KLEB was owned by the Harold Callais family of Golden Meadow who also owned the local cable company. During its life under Callais Cablevision, programming was mainly country music. In the early 1990s, It shared programming with sister station KBAU-FM 94.3 (later KLEB-FM before being sold in 1995 and becoming WTIX-FM). This station was sold by the family in 1999 to Coastal Broadcasting of Larose, who installed a Cajun music format on the station. KLEB simulcasted much of KLRZ's programming until KLRZ changed formats to sports in 2014. Since that time, KLEB has continued broadcasting the "Rajun' Cajun" format.

In the wake of Hurricane Ida, KLEB's transmitter was destroyed. The Federal Communications Commission granted special dispensation for the station to operate exclusively on the dependent FM translator, which remained in service. KLEB resumed operation on April 27, 2022 at 720 watts day/60 watts night nondirectional.
