= KRLQ =

- Hodge, Louisiana; United States
- Broadcast area: Ruston, Louisiana
- Frequency: 94.1 MHz
- Branding: Q94.1

Programming
- Language: English
- Format: Classic country
- Affiliations: Fox News Radio; New Orleans Saints Radio Network

Ownership
- Owner: Murell Brandon Forester; (Omega Entertainment, LLC)
- Sister stations: KWXM

Technical information
- Licensing authority: FCC
- Facility ID: 166024
- Class: C2
- ERP: 47,000 watts
- HAAT: 76.2 meters (250 ft)
- Transmitter coordinates: 32°24′35.00″N 92°53′49.00″W

Links
- Public license information: Public file; LMS
- Webcast: Listen Live
- Website: krlqfm.com

KRLQ (94.1 FM, "Q94.1") is an American radio station broadcasting a classic country music format. Licensed to Hodge, Louisiana, United States, the station serves Ruston, Jonesboro, Minden, and the surrounding areas. The station is owned by Murel Brandon Forester, through licensee Omega Entertainment, LLC

The station is an affiliate of the New Orleans Saints radio network.

The station has been the flagship home of Ruston High School since the 2024-25 school year.

== History ==
KRLQ's frequency and ability to build a station was won by William Brown in FCC auction 62 held in 2006. The station became licensed in late 2007.

The station's power was upgraded from 35,000 watts to 47,000 watts as of February 8, 2008.

== Technical specifications ==
Station antenna is an Electronics Research Inc. LPX-10C 10-bay full wavelength spaced providing 5.680 db of gain. There is 272 feet (83 m) of Andrew 1 5/8-inch (41 mm) air dielectric hard line running from the transmitter to the antenna, with the transmitter broadcasting at 9,382 watts to equal 47,000 watts out of the antenna.

== See also ==
- KTOC-FM: also licensed to Jackson Parish
