= WKZW =

- Sandersville, Mississippi; United States
- Broadcast area: Laurel-Hattiesburg
- Frequency: 94.3 MHz (HD Radio)
- Branding: KZ-94.3

Programming
- Language: English
- Format: Adult contemporary
- Subchannels: HD2: Urban oldies
- Affiliations: United Stations Radio Networks

Ownership
- Owner: Blakeney Communications, Inc.
- Sister stations: WBBL; WBBN; WXRR

History
- First air date: July 7, 1975
- Former call signs: WXIY (1975–1987); WIZK-FM (1987–1998)
- Former frequencies: 93.5 MHz (1975–1998)

Technical information
- Licensing authority: FCC
- Facility ID: 14021
- Class: C2
- ERP: 14,500 watts
- HAAT: 279 meters (915 ft)
- Transmitter coordinates: 31°25′52.60″N 89°08′51.20″W
- Translator: HD2: 97.7 W249AO (Hattiesburg)

Links
- Public license information: Public file; LMS
- Webcast: Listen live Listen live (HD2)
- Website: kz943.com 977thegroove.com (HD2)

WKZW (94.3 FM, "KZ-94.3") is a commercial radio station licensed to Sandersville, Mississippi, United States, and serving the Laurel-Hattiesburg area. The station is owned by Blakeney Communications, Inc. It airs an adult contemporary music format. The station airs the Murphy, Sam, and Jodi morning show and is the flagship station for Southern Miss Golden Eagles baseball.

== History ==
WKZW began operation July 7, 1975 on 93.5 MHz as the FM sister station to WIZK. In 1998, its format was changed from country to hot adult contemporary after it was purchased by Blakeney Communications. The station was assigned the WKZW call letters by the Federal Communications Commission on April 8, 1998 (which were formerly assigned to the Peoria, Illinois legendary KZ-93 and later, KZ-94.3 in the same market). A few weeks later, WKZW moved to 94.3 MHz, which allowed it to improve its signal and become a maximized Class C2 station.
