= KWXM =

KWXM Roux 102.3
- Simsboro, Louisiana; United States
- Broadcast area: Ruston-Grambling and the surrounding areas
- Frequency: 102.3 MHz
- Branding: The Roux 102

Programming
- Language: English
- Format: Generation X

Ownership
- Owner: Murel Brandon Forester; (Omega Entertainment, LLC)
- Sister stations: KRLQ

History
- First air date: September 2, 2015

Technical information
- Licensing authority: FCC
- Facility ID: 166024
- Class: A
- ERP: 3,000 watts
- HAAT: 143.6 meters (471 ft)
- Transmitter coordinates: 32°39′43.00″N 92°57′10.00″W

Links
- Public license information: Roux 102.3 Public file; LMS
- Webcast: Listen live
- Website: KWXM Online

KWXM (Roux 102.3 FM) is an American radio station broadcasting Generation X music format. Licensed to Simsboro, Louisiana, United States, the station serves Ruston, Claiborne Parish, and the surrounding areas. The station is currently owned by Murel Brandon Forester, through licensee Omega Entertainment, LLC

== History ==
KWXM's frequency and ability to build a station was won by William W. Brown held in 2015.
