= WKBU =

New Orleans, Louisiana; United States
- Broadcast area: New Orleans metropolitan area
- Frequency: 95.7 MHz (HD Radio)
- Branding: Bayou 95.7

Programming
- Language: English
- Format: Classic rock
- Affiliations: United Stations Radio Networks

Ownership
- Owner: Audacy, Inc.; (Audacy License, LLC)
- Sister stations: WEZB; WLMG; WWL; WWL-FM; WWWL

History
- First air date: February 1953; 72 years ago
- Former call signs: WWMT (1953–1971); WBYU (1971–1987); WQXY (1987–1990); WMXZ (1990–1993); WTKL (1993–2005)
- Call sign meaning: Kenner (city of license for 105.3 FM); "Bayou"

Technical information
- Licensing authority: FCC
- Facility ID: 52434
- Class: C
- ERP: 100,000 watts
- HAAT: 300 meters (980 ft)
- Transmitter coordinates: 29.920°N 90.025°W

Links
- Public license information: Public file; LMS
- Webcast: Listen live (via Audacy)
- Website: www.audacy.com/bayou957

WKBU (95.7 FM, "Bayou 95.7") is a radio station licensed to New Orleans, owned by Audacy, Inc. It broadcasts a classic rock radio format, from studios it shares with sister stations at 400 Poydras Tower in downtown New Orleans. The station's transmitter site is in the city's Algiers district.

The station broadcasts in HD Radio; its second subchannel formerly carried Metal Militia—a heavy metal-based format which changed its name in 2018 from The Metal Channel. The subchannel previously carried Live Rock.

== History ==
WTKL was at one time beautiful music WBYU (called Bayou 96) before going through a succession of ill-fated formats from country as WQXY (Y-96) from 1987 to 1990 and adult contemporary as WMXZ (Mix 95.7) from 1990 to 1993.

=== 1993-2005: Oldies ===
In 1993, the station finally found suceess with an oldies format known as Kool 95.7 FM.

=== 2005–present: Classic rock ===
Former logo

Due to flood damage to its transmitter in the aftermath of Hurricane Katrina, WKBU and WTKL switched frequencies in early-October 2005. At this time, the station became WKBU "Bayou 95-7" with a classic rock format.
