= United Radio Broadcasters of New Orleans =

Consortium of radio stations in Greater New Orleans, Louisiana

United Radio Broadcasters of New Orleans was a consortium of radio stations in Greater New Orleans, Louisiana, formed in response to the crisis of Hurricane Katrina. It began on September 1, 2005. Led by WWL-AM, the stations shared equipment, space, and personnel, and simulcast public affairs and public service programming—including efforts to reunite families.

The arrangement was unique in that it involved the cooperation of two large, rival media companies, Clear Channel Communications and Entercom Communications. Other participants included the Louisiana Network and independent stations KLCL in Lake Charles and KJEF in Jennings. It eventually included stations broadcasting in Louisiana, Texas, Alabama, Mississippi and Florida. It also broadcast over the Internet and on a few shortwave frequencies.

United Radio Broadcasters of New Orleans was disbanded on November 4, 2005.

== Member stations ==
The following stations were part of the United Radio Broadcasters of New Orleans network.

- WWL (flagship station)
- KHEV-FM (currently known as KVDU)
- KJEF
- KLCL-AM
- WHRI-SW (shortwave radio)
- WLMG-FM
- WQUE-FM
- WSMB-AM (currently known as WWWL)
- WYLD-FM
