= WBBL (FM) =

Radio station in Richton–Hattiesburg, Mississippi

- Richton, Mississippi; United States
- Broadcast area: Hattiesburg-Laurel
- Frequency: 96.5 MHz
- Branding: Alive 96.5

Programming
- Language: English
- Format: Southern gospel
- Affiliations: New Orleans Saints Radio Network; Salem Radio Network

Ownership
- Owner: Blakeney Communications, Inc.
- Sister stations: WBBN; WKZW; WXRR

History
- First air date: 1995 (as WESV)
- Former call signs: WESV (1991–1997); WXHB (1997–2021)
- Call sign meaning: Blakeney Broadcasting in Laurel

Technical information
- Licensing authority: FCC
- Facility ID: 70409
- Class: C3
- ERP: 5,700 watts
- HAAT: 175 meters (574 ft)
- Transmitter coordinates: 31°28′9.6″N 88°45′53.1″W

Links
- Public license information: Public file; LMS
- Webcast: Listen live
- Website: www.alive.fm

WBBL (96.5 FM; "Alive 96.5") is a southern gospel music formatted commercial radio station licensed to Richton, Mississippi, United States, and serving Hattiesburg, Laurel, and the Pine Belt region. The station is owned by Blakeney Communications, Inc. Its transmitter is located east of Richton.

== Programming ==
WBBL is an affiliate of the Salem Radio Network. The station carries SRN News at the top of each hour during regular programming. Sunday mornings, WBBL airs the nationally syndicated program The Gospel Greats, hosted by Paul Heil. Monday nights, WBBL airs Gospel Grass, two hours of bluegrass music hosted by local broadcaster David McPhail.

On Sunday mornings, WBBL broadcasts a fifteen-minute inspirational message from the Ellisville Assembly of God Church, with Brother Morris.

On Sunday evenings, WBBL broadcasts an hour of inspirational religiously themed messages from Sanford Missionary Baptist Church, with Brother James Broome and then following Sanford, County Line Baptist Church with Brother Everette Broome. Although the churches are in close proximity to one another, and the two men know each other, they are not related.

WBBL also carries live coverage of sporting events involving local teams, including The University of Southern Mississippi baseball and women's basketball.

The station is an affiliate of the New Orleans Saints radio network.
