= WXRR =

- Hattiesburg, Mississippi; United States
- Broadcast area: Hattiesburg-Laurel
- Frequency: 104.5 MHz
- Branding: Rock 104

Programming
- Language: English
- Format: Classic rock

Ownership
- Owner: Blakeney Communications, Inc.
- Sister stations: WBBL; WBBN; WKZW

History
- First air date: July 1, 1967
- Former call signs: WHSY-FM (1967–1995)
- Call sign meaning: Rock and Roll

Technical information
- Licensing authority: FCC
- Facility ID: 29549
- Class: C1
- ERP: 100,000 watts
- HAAT: 299 meters (981 ft)
- Transmitter coordinates: 31°25′52.6″N 89°08′51.2″W

Links
- Public license information: Public file; LMS
- Webcast: Listen live
- Website: www.rock104fm.com

WXRR (104.5 FM, "Rock 104") is a commercial radio station broadcasting a classic rock format. Licensed to Hattiesburg, Mississippi, United States, the station serves the Hattiesburg-Laurel area. WXRR is a maximized Class C1 station and is currently owned by Blakeney Communications, Inc.

The station's previous call letters were WHSY-FM as "Y-104" with a rock format when it was owned by Charlie Holt. The station was purchased in 1994 by Blakeney Communications. In its present form, the station signed on for the first time on April 1, 1995.

== Programming ==
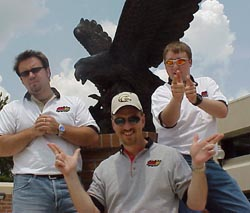
The Morning Crew on ROCK104

The Morning Crew on Rock 104 is the most listened-to local morning radio show in the Laurel-Hattiesburg market, and is currently the longest-running locally produced morning radio program in the market, having been on the air since 2002. Composed of Tom Colt, Flyin' Bryan Hicks, Jon Lamar and previously Andy Webb and Tanner Watson. The Morning Crew on Rock 104 were awarded the "Mississippi Association of Broadcasters' Radio Personalities of the Year" title in 2006, 2008, 2009, and 2010 (2010 being the last year the MAB gave out the award). The show's signature features include "News Not Making the News", the "Stupid Question of the Day", and Andy's acerbically funny truck-driving uncle, "Ray Wallbanger". Each day's show also allows "The Morning Crew" to offer their take on (and often irreverently skewer) the day's local and national news headlines.

WXRR is the flagship station for The University of Southern Mississippi football and men's basketball. In addition to carrying live coverage of the football and basketball teams' games, WXRR also airs talk shows with the head coaches of the teams.

== Birthplace of rock and roll ==
The station often identifies itself as "broadcasting from the birthplace of rock & roll". Hattiesburg was home to The Graves Brothers, Blind Roosevelt Graves and Uaroy Graves, who, along with piano player Cooney Vaughn, recorded two songs in 1936 that featured "fully formed rock & roll guitar riffs and a stomping rock & roll beat."
