= KJIN =

Radio station in Houma, Louisiana

- Houma, Louisiana; United States
- Broadcast area: Houma–Thibodaux
- Frequency: 1490 kHz
- Branding: 104.7 Jamz

Programming
- Language: English
- Format: Urban adult contemporary

Ownership
- Owner: Bayou Radio Group; (JLE, Incorporated)
- Sister stations: KCIL, KDLC, WGUO

History
- First air date: 1946; 80 years ago
- Former call signs: KCIL (1947–1967); KJIN (1967–2000); KFXY (2000–2003)

Technical information
- Licensing authority: FCC
- Facility ID: 25521
- Class: C
- Power: 1,000 watts
- Transmitter coordinates: 29°34′14″N 90°43′42″W
- Translator: 104.7 K284CU (Houma)

Links
- Public license information: Public file; LMS
- Webcast: Listen Live
- Website: 1047jamz.com

KJIN (1490 kHz) is a commercial AM radio station in Houma, Louisiana. It is owned by Lisa D. Stiglets, under the corporate name JLE, Incorporated, and airs an urban adult contemporary radio format. The studios and offices are on West Main Street in Houma.

KJIN is powered at 1,000 watts, using a non-directional antenna. The transmitter is on Fahey Street in Houma. The station can also be heard on FM translator K284CU, broadcasting at 250 watts on 104.7 MHz. KJIN uses its FM translator’s frequency in calling itself "104.7 Jamz."

== History ==
This station signed on as KCIL in 1946. It was owned by Charles W. Lamar, Jr. and was a network affiliate of the Mutual Broadcasting System. Its transmitter power was 250 watts.

In 1967, it changed its call sign to KJIN, which it has held ever since, except for a period between 2000 and 2003 when it held KFXY, which was the former call sign of today's KCIL.

For most of its recent past, it was an AM simulcast to 96.7 KCIL. However the former owners Guaranty Broadcasting installed the ESPN Radio all-sports format on the station to provide listeners in the area with a sports station that was listenable in the Houma area as the nearest sports stations were up to 50 miles away at the time.

In 2006 the station was purchased by Sunburst Media of Louisiana and continued broadcasting ESPN sports programming until 2014 when it changed to Fox Sports Radio. In March 2015, KJIN began programming Spanish language music, known as "La Calliente." The Regional Mexican format was aimed at the Mexican-American community in the listening area in and around Houma, as well as the western outskirts of New Orleans.

Effective November 11, 2015, KJIN, KCIL and co-owned KXOR-FM were sold to James Anderson's My Home Team Media, LLC. Effective May 9, 2017, My Home Team Media sold KJIN and KCIL to JLE, Incorporated for $725,000.

On March 13, 2018, KJIN changed its format to urban adult contemporary, branded as "104.7 Jamz." It is simulcast on FM translator K284CU 104.7 FM in Houma.
