= WCJU (AM) =

- Columbia, Mississippi; United States
- Frequency: 1450 kHz
- Branding: 102.7 The Pearl

Programming
- Format: Classic hits

Ownership
- Owner: WCJU, Incorporated
- Sister stations: WHSY; WJDR; WSSM

History
- First air date: December 20, 1946

Technical information
- Licensing authority: FCC
- Facility ID: 71281
- Class: C
- Power: 1,000 watts unlimited
- Transmitter coordinates: 31°14′14.6″N 89°50′24.3″W
- Translator: (102.7 MHz) W274CB (Columbia)

Links
- Public license information: Public file; LMS
- Webcast: Listen live
- Website: www.wcjufm.com

WCJU (1450 AM) is a radio station licensed to Columbia, Mississippi, United States. The station is currently owned by WCJU, Incorporated.

== History ==
WCJU began broadcasting in the spring of 1947. On September 26, 1947, The Federal Communications Commission approved the station's sale from Forrest Broadcasting Company to Lester Williams, a Mississippi publisher. The price was $25,000. At that time, WCJU operated full-time on 1450 kHz with 250 watts of power.
