= WJDR =

- Prentiss, Mississippi; United States
- Broadcast area: Prentiss-Columbia, Mississippi
- Frequency: 98.3 MHz
- Branding: South Mississippi's Talk Station 98.3

Programming
- Format: News/talk
- Affiliations: Fox News Radio; Premiere Networks; Westwood One

Ownership
- Owner: Sun Belt Broadcasting Corporation
- Sister stations: WCJU (AM), WHSY, WSSM (FM)

History
- First air date: July 1981

Technical information
- Licensing authority: FCC
- Facility ID: 63792
- Class: A
- ERP: 6,000 watts
- HAAT: 100.0 meters (328 feet)
- Transmitter coordinates: 31°29′37.60″N 89°53′33.20″W

Links
- Public license information: Public file; LMS
- Webcast: https://streamdb3web.securenetsystems.net/v5/WJDR
- Website: wcjufm.com

WJDR (98.3 FM) is a radio station broadcasting a news/talk format. It is licensed to Prentiss, Mississippi, United States. The station is currently owned by Sun Belt Broadcasting Corporation and features programming from Westwood One, Premiere Networks, and Fox News Radio.
