= WHSY =

- Hattiesburg, Mississippi; United States
- Broadcast area: Hattiesburg-Laurel
- Frequency: 950 kHz
- Branding: Hattiesburg's Talk Station

Programming
- Language: English
- Format: Talk radio
- Affiliations: Premiere Networks; Radio America; Westwood One

Ownership
- Owner: Timothy D. Lee; (Sunbelt Broadcasting Corporation)
- Sister stations: WCJU; WJDR; WSSM

History
- First air date: September 1, 1954
- Former call signs: WBKH (1954–2005)
- Call sign meaning: Formerly used by a station on 1230 AM

Technical information
- Licensing authority: FCC
- Facility ID: 61237
- Class: D
- Power: 5,000 watts (day); 64 watts (night)
- Transmitter coordinates: 31°22′33.6″N 89°19′49.2″W
- Translator: (105.9 MHz) W290DQ (Hattiesburg)

Links
- Public license information: Public file; LMS
- Webcast: Listen live
- Website: www.wcjufm.com

WHSY (950 AM, "Hattiesburg's Talk Station") is a commercial radio station broadcasting a news/talk format. Licensed to Hattiesburg, Mississippi, United States, the station serves the Hattiesburg-Laurel area. The station is owned by Timothy D. Lee's Lee Airwaves, LLC, through licensee Sunbelt Broadcasting Corporation.

== Programming ==
As of July 2026, WHSY's weekday program schedule includes The Rick Burgess Show, The Glenn Beck Radio Program, The Clay Travis and Buck Sexton Show, The Dana Show, The Jesse Kelly Show, and Red Eye Radio. Most hours begin with a news update from Townhall.
