= WLMG =

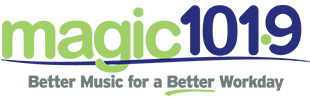
- New Orleans, Louisiana; United States
- Broadcast area: New Orleans metropolitan area
- Frequency: 101.9 MHz (HD Radio)
- Branding: Magic 101.9

Programming
- Language: English
- Format: Adult contemporary

Ownership
- Owner: Audacy, Inc.; (Audacy License, LLC)
- Sister stations: WEZB; WKBU; WWL; WWL-FM; WWWL

History
- First air date: March 15, 1970
- Former call signs: WWL-FM (1970–1980); WAJY (1980–1987)
- Call sign meaning: "Louisiana's Magic"

Technical information
- Licensing authority: FCC
- Facility ID: 34376
- Class: C0
- ERP: 100,000 watts
- HAAT: 300 meters (980 ft)
- Transmitter coordinates: 29°55′11″N 90°1′29″W

Links
- Public license information: Public file; LMS
- Webcast: Listen live (via Audacy)
- Website: www.audacy.com/magic1019

WLMG (101.9 FM, "Magic 101.9 FM") is a commercial radio station licensed to New Orleans, Louisiana, owned by Audacy, Inc. The station broadcasts an adult contemporary radio format, its studios and offices are located at the 400 Poydras Tower in New Orleans' downtown district.

WLMG has an effective radiated power (ERP) of 100,000 watts, the maximum for non-grandfathered FM stations. Its transmitter site is off Behrman Highway in the Algiers neighborhood of New Orleans. WLMG broadcasts in the HD Radio hybrid format.

== History ==
=== WWL-FM ===
The station first signed on the air as WWL-FM, on March 15, 1970. It was owned by Loyola University of the South, now known as Loyola University New Orleans. Loyola also owned WWL-TV and AM powerhouse WWL.

WWL and WWL-FM had the same call sign but separate formats. The AM was a full service middle of the road station, while WWL-FM played beautiful music. It featured quarter-hour sweeps of instrumental cover versions of popular songs with Hollywood and Broadway show tunes.

=== Top 40 and easy listening ===
In the mid-1970s, station management decided to go in a radically different direction, seeking a younger demographic for WWL-FM, as the FM flipped to a Top 40 format. However, the flip occurred during an era where most young people still were listening to inexpensive AM radios for their favorite hits. The station failed to make much headway against AM Top 40 leader WTIX.

By May 1976, WWL-FM returned to easy listening music. The format featured mostly instrumental songs with several soft vocals each hour. On December 26, 1980, to separate the FM station's image from its AM and TV counterparts, the call letters were changed to WAJY. The station, calling itself "Joy 102," moved closer to a 50/50 mix of instrumentals and vocals, some from soft rock artists such as Elton John, Olivia Newton-John, Stevie Wonder and Chicago.

=== Switch to WLMG ===
Through the 1980s, the easy format saw its audience continuing to age, while most advertisers seek young and middle-aged listeners. In 1987, the station completed its transition to a soft adult contemporary format, eliminating the instrumentals. The call sign was changed to WLMG, and rebranded as "Magic 102." With most radios in the 1990s going from analog dials to digital, the station began calling itself "Magic 101.9" in 1995.

Over the next decade, WWL and WLMG changed hands several times. In 1989, Loyola University sold the stations to Keymarket Communications. The TV station was sold to a group of its employees, using the name Rampart Broadcasting. In July 1995, the radio stations were acquired by River City Broadcasting. Later ownership switched to Sinclair Broadcast Group. In December 1999, WWL and WLMG were acquired by Entercom.

In the early 2000s, WLMG moved to a mainstream adult contemporary format. In 2006, the WWL-FM call sign returned to New Orleans on 105.3 FM.
