= WIZK =

- Bay Springs, Mississippi; United States
- Broadcast area: Jasper County, Mississippi
- Frequency: 1570 kHz
- Branding: K-101

Programming
- Format: Country

Ownership
- Owner: Steve Stringer; (Sage Communications, LLC)

History
- First air date: September 10, 1971 (first license granted)
- Former call signs: WHII (?-1987)

Technical information
- Licensing authority: FCC
- Facility ID: 14022
- Class: D
- Power: 3,200 watts (day only)
- Transmitter coordinates: 31°57′56″N 89°18′03″W
- Translators: W270CZ (101.9 MHz, Bay Springs)

Links
- Public license information: Public file; LMS
- Website: k101country.com

WIZK (1570 AM) is a radio station licensed to serve Bay Springs, Mississippi. The station is owned by Steve Stringer, through licensee Sage Communications, LLC. It airs a country music format. The station was assigned the WIZK call letters by the Federal Communications Commission in 1987.

It is one of the few stations left in the United States that are owned by an individual rather than a corporation. WHII had a sister station, WXIY at 94.3 FM on which was a simulcast of the AM programming. In the 1970s, WHII was a daytime only station, and when WHII (AM) signed off, the sister station WXIY (FM) changed to R&B format until its signoff at midnight. In the 1980s, WXIY dropped its callsign in favor of WHII, still a country music station, simulcasting, with the change of callsign of WIZK in the latter part of the decade. In the late 1990s, the FM station was sold to Blakeney Communications, Inc. and became WKZW "KZ-94".
