= KLRZ =

Coordinates: 29.550°N 90.351°W

Larose, Louisiana; United States
- Broadcast area: New Orleans metropolitan area
- Frequency: 100.3 MHz (HD Radio)
- Branding: Streetz 100.3

Programming
- Format: Urban contemporary

Ownership
- Owner: Coastal Broadcasting of Larose
- Operator: Core Radio Group

History
- First air date: 1992; 33 years ago
- Former call signs: KMZM (1991–1992, CP)
- Call sign meaning: LRZ is from the city of license Larose

Technical information
- Licensing authority: FCC
- Facility ID: 19212
- Class: C1
- ERP: 89,000 watts
- HAAT: 178.7 meters

Links
- Public license information: Public file; LMS
- Webcast: Listen live
- Website: streetz1003nola.com

KLRZ (100.3 FM) is a radio station licensed to Larose, Louisiana. Owned by Coastal Broadcasting, KLRZ targets both New Orleans and the Tri-Parishes area.

== History ==
In the early-to-mid-1990s, this station's moniker was Z-100, and was playing a Top 40/Rhythmic hybrid format aimed at the New Orleans market at the time. The format was then changed to a Classic Rock format with a mid-morning talk show in June 1996.

In July 2005, Citadel Broadcasting entered into a $6,000,000 agreement to buy the station. However, after Hurricane Katrina, they had backed out of the purchase. In fact, a new tower had been built to put a better signal into New Orleans, and was turned on the week before Katrina hit. Speculation was that Citadel was going to either sign on a Rockin' Country format onto this signal (which eventually was put on 106.7) or move the format of 106.7 the End to 100.3.

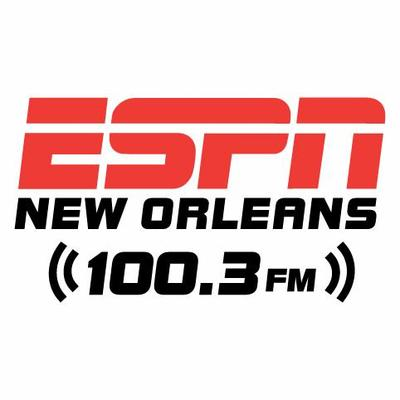
Previous logo

A format of regional music called swamp pop was produced on the radio station for a number of years using the branding "Rajun Cajun". This format was later moved to sister station KLEB in 2014. On January 1, 2014, the station dropped the swamp pop music and flipped to sports radio as the ESPN Radio affiliate in the New Orleans market. The station was named the new flagship station of the New Orleans Pelicans on June 26, 2019.

Ahead of the 2024–25 New Orleans Pelicans season, the team announced its move to WWL, while Gus Kattengell ended his afternoon show, leaving KLRZ with no local programming. In October 2024, Steve Hegwood, via Core Radio Group, took over operations of KLRZ under a time brokerage agreement. The agreement includes an option for Hegwood to buy the station outright, with payments from the time brokerage agreement being credited from the purchase price. Hegwood had previously owned urban contemporary KNOU Hot 104.5 via On Top Communications before its facilities were destroyed by Hurricane Katrina.

After Core Radio Group assumed operations, KLRZ dropped ESPN Radio and began stunting as Wayne 100.3, playing only music by New Orleans native Lil Wayne. On November 4, 2024, KLRZ flipped to urban contemporary as Streetz 100.3.
