= WBBN =

Radio station in Taylorsville–Laurel–Hattiesburg, Mississippi

- Taylorsville, Mississippi; United States
- Broadcast area: Laurel-Hattiesburg
- Frequency: 95.9 MHz
- Branding: B-95

Programming
- Language: English
- Format: Country

Ownership
- Owner: Blakeney Communications, Inc.
- Sister stations: WBBL; WKZW; WXRR

History
- First air date: 1985
- Call sign meaning: Blakeney Broadcasting

Technical information
- Licensing authority: FCC
- Facility ID: 71207
- Class: C1
- ERP: 100,000 watts
- HAAT: 223 meters (732 ft)
- Transmitter coordinates: 31°38′03.60″N 89°28′35.20″W

Links
- Public license information: Public file; LMS
- Webcast: Listen live
- Website: www.b95country.com

WBBN (95.9 FM, "B-95") is a commercial radio station licensed to the community of Taylorsville, Mississippi, United States, and serving the Laurel-Hattiesburg area. The station is owned by Blakeney Communications, Inc. It airs a country music format.

The station was assigned the WBBN call letters by the Federal Communications Commission on August 22, 1984.

== History ==
WBBN began in a mobile home near Hebron, Mississippi, in 1985 as an automated-assist station (automated equipment with live personalities) and it has built a reputation for the "most accurate news reporting" of all radio stations in the market. The station has since expanded to a more permanent structure, following its success against other competing country stations.
