= WGUO =

Coordinates: 29.730°N 90.727°W

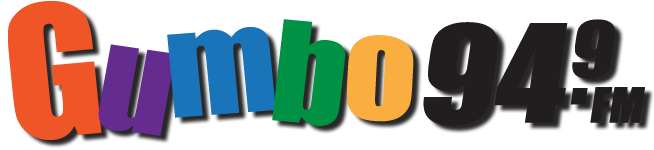

Reserve, Louisiana; United States
- Broadcast area: New Orleans metropolitan area - Houma - Thibodaux
- Frequency: 94.9 MHz
- Branding: Gumbo 94.9

Programming
- Language: English
- Format: Classic Country

Ownership
- Owner: Bayou Radio Group
- Sister stations: KCIL, KDLC, KJIN

History
- First air date: May 17, 1991; 34 years ago (as WADU-FM)
- Former call signs: WADU-FM (1991–2000); WSJZ (2000–2002); WXXM (2002–2003); WPRF (2003–2012)
- Call sign meaning: W GUmbO

Technical information
- Facility ID: 70279
- Class: C2
- ERP: 50,000 watts
- HAAT: 146.9 meters (482 ft)

Links
- Webcast: Listen Live
- Website: gumbo949.com

WGUO (94.9 MHz "Gumbo 94.9"), is a commercial FM radio station, licensed to Reserve, Louisiana, and serving the New Orleans area. The station is owned by Dowdy Broadcasting and airs a Classic Country radio format. The studios and offices are on West Main Street in Houma, Louisiana.

WGUO has an effective radiated power (ERP) of 50,000 watts. The transmitter is off Burma Road in Raceland, Louisiana.

== History ==
The station signed on in August 1991, as WADU-FM. It was owned by Virgie Hare du Treil, with studios in Laplace. WADU carried an easy listening - adult standards format. It was only powered at 1,900 watts, a fraction of its current output.

It flipped to smooth jazz as WSJZ on May 24, 2000. On June 6, 2002, it changed its call sign, becoming WXXM. It played active rock and carried the syndicated Opie & Anthony morning show briefly before switching to urban gospel as WPRF on April 21, 2003.

As WPRF, the station's slogan was "New Orleans' Inspiration Station." The Program Director was Jojo Walker, whose experience included Morning Show Producer of the K.D. Bowe Morning Show at the Sheridan Gospel Network. He also held morning and afternoon drive time jobs at 98.5 WYLD-FM in New Orleans, and positions at Mix 96 WBTP and 1380 WTMP in Tampa and 1080 WUFO in Buffalo, New York.

On October 3, 2012, WPRF changed call letters to WGUO. On November 10, 2012, WGUO changed its format to classic country, branded as "Gumbo 94.9". The programming is aimed at both the New Orleans and Houma - Thibodaux radio markets.
