= WSSM (FM) =

- Prentiss, Mississippi; United States
- Frequency: 104.9 MHz
- Branding: 104.9 The Legend

Programming
- Format: Classic country

Ownership
- Owner: Sunbelt Broadcasting Corporation
- Sister stations: WCJU; WHSY; WJDR

History
- First air date: 2002
- Former call signs: WBFL (1998–2001); WCJU-FM (2001–2020)

Technical information
- Licensing authority: FCC
- Facility ID: 85341
- Class: A
- ERP: 2,800 watts
- HAAT: 133 meters (436 ft)
- Transmitter coordinates: 31°31′56.6″N 89°56′17.3″W

Links
- Public license information: Public file; LMS
- Webcast: Listen live
- Website: www.wcjufm.com

WSSM (104.9 FM) is a radio station broadcasting a classic country format licensed to Prentiss, Mississippi, United States. The station is owned by Sunbelt Broadcasting Corporation.

On July 1, 2017, the then-WCJU-FM changed their format from oldies to talk and classic hits.
