= Houma–Bayou Cane–Thibodaux metropolitan area =

Region of southern Louisiana, United States

Houma–Bayou Cane–Thibodaux
- Metropolitan statistical area
- Houma–Bayou Cane–Thibodaux, LA metropolitan statistical area
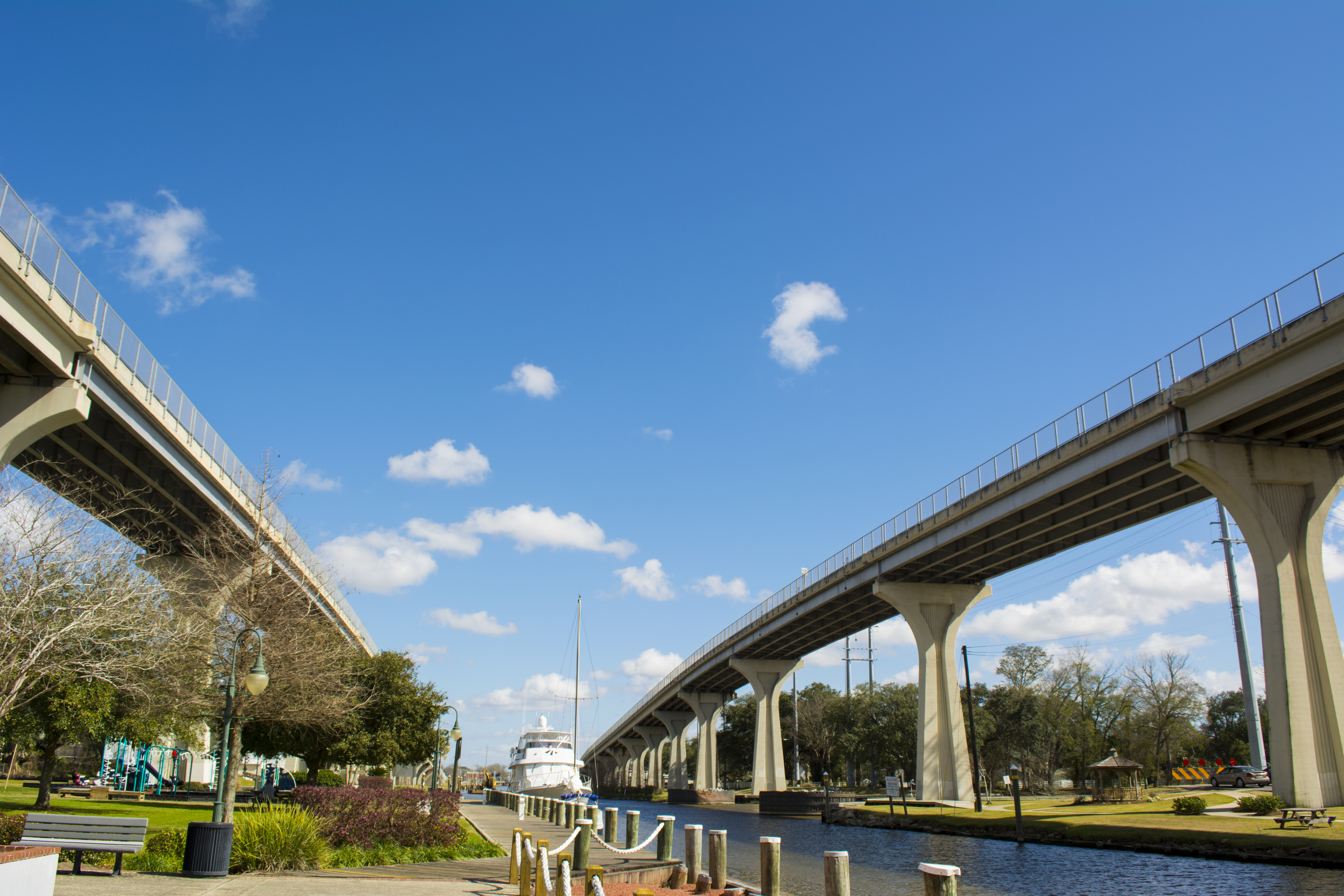
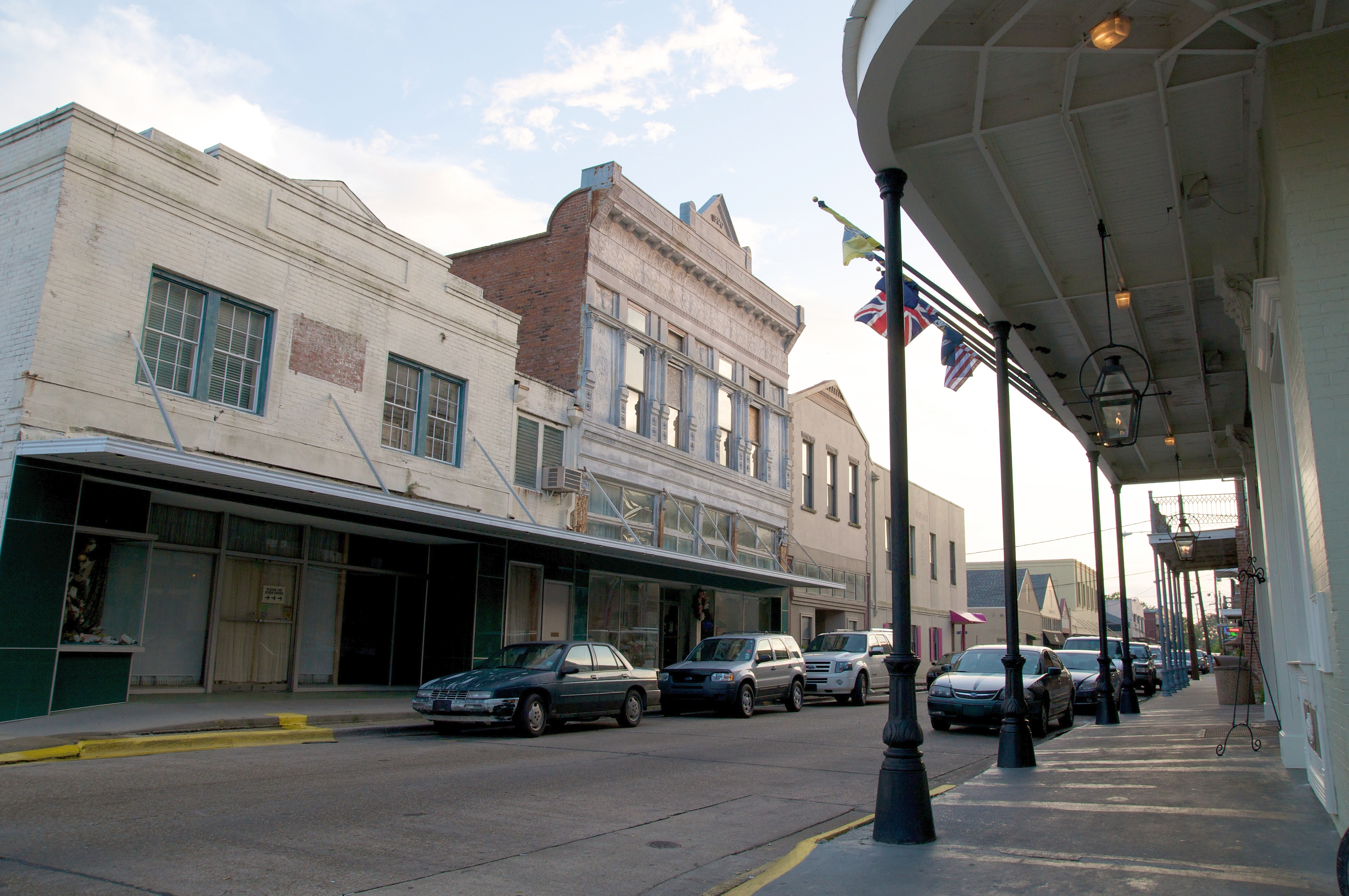
- From top to bottom: Houma, Thibodaux
Map of Houma–Bayou Cane–Thibodaux, LA MSA
City of Houma
City of Bayou Cane
City of Thibodaux
Houma–Bayou Cane–Thibodaux, LA MSA
- Country: United States
- State: Louisiana
- Principal communities: List: Houma; Bayou Cane; Thibodaux

Population (2020)
  - MSA: 207,137 (221st)
- Time zone: UTC-6 (CST)
  - Summer (DST): UTC-5 (CDT)

The Houma–Bayou Cane–Thibodaux metropolitan area, officially the Houma–Bayou Cane–Thibodaux metropolitan statistical area, is a Metropolitan Statistical Area in the Acadiana region of southern Louisiana, United States that covers two parishes—Lafourche and Terrebonne. The metropolis had a 2020 census-tabulated population of 207,137.

The parish seat of Lafourche Parish, Thibodaux, is located 15 miles NNW from the parish seat of Terrebonne Parish, Houma. Bayou Cane is the commercial district of Terrebonne Parish and Lafourche Parish and is commonly referred to by locals as Houma. In 2014, Forbes magazine ranked Houma-Thibodaux as the eighth-fastest-growing small city in the United States. The metropolitan area is commonly referred to by locals as South Louisiana or the Houma–Thibodaux area.

== Parishes ==
- Lafourche Parish
- Terrebonne Parish

== Communities ==
=== Cities ===
- Houma (Principal city)
- Thibodaux (Principal city)

=== Towns ===
- Golden Meadow
- Lockport

=== Unincorporated communities ===
- Bayou Cane (Principal city)
- Bourg
- Chackbay
- Chauvin
- Cut Off
- Des Allemands (partial)
- Dulac
- Galliano
- Gibson
- Gray
- Larose
- Mathews
- Montegut
- Port Fourchon
- Raceland
- Schriever

== Demographics ==
As of the census of 2000, there were 194,477 people, 68,084 households, and 51,692 families residing within the MSA. The racial makeup of the MSA was 78.13% White, 15.40% Black, 3.91% Native American, 0.74% Asian, 0.02% Pacific Islander, 0.56% from other races, and 1.25% from two or more races. Hispanic or Latinos of any race were 1.50% of the population. The median income for a household in the MSA was $35,073, and the median income for a family was $40,208. Males had a median income of $34,735 versus $20,095 for females. The per capita income for the MSA was $15,930.

In 2021, the American Community Survey estimated there were 206,212 people, down from 207,137 at the 2020 census. Among the population in 2021, the racial make up was 71% white, 14% Black and African American, 4% Native American, 1% Asian, 5% multiracial, and 5% Hispanic or Latinos of any race. The median household income for a family in the metropolitan area increased to $61,478 at the 2021 census estimates, making it wealthier than Greater New Orleans ($56,837), Greater Baton Rouge ($58,276), and Metropolitan Lafayette ($53,931) at the time of the census estimates.

== Economy ==
The Houma–Thibodaux–Bayou Cane region's economy is strongly oriented toward the production of petroleum and natural gas. It is notable that during the Great Recession, the region maintained low unemployment rates. According to the U.S. Bureau of Labor Statistics, the region registered a 3.5% unemployment rate in February 2009, the lowest of any metro area in the United States at the time.

== Transportation ==
The metropolitan area's main thoroughfare is U.S. Highway 90, which runs east to west and passes directly between Houma and Thibodaux.

== See also ==
- Louisiana census statistical areas
- List of cities, towns, and villages in Louisiana
- List of census-designated places in Louisiana
