= 400 Poydras Tower =

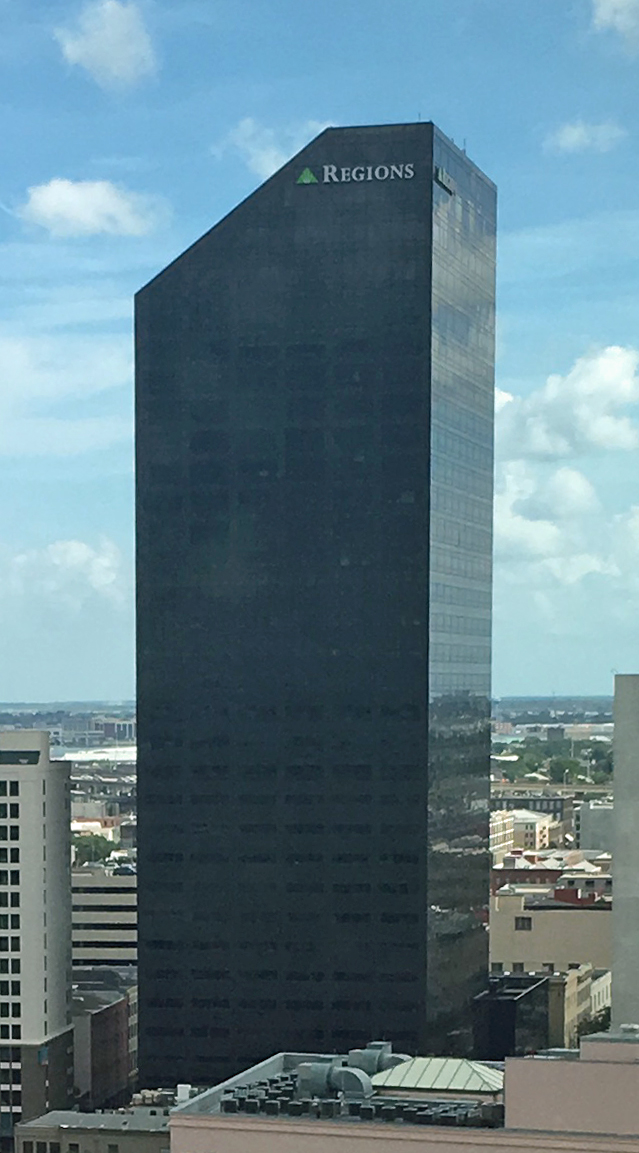

General information
- Type: Office
- Location: 400 Poydras Street; New Orleans, LA; United States
- Coordinates: 29.9485°N 90.0679°W
- Completed: 1983

Height
- Antenna spire: N/A
- Roof: 442 feet (135 m)

Technical details
- Floor count: 32
- Floor area: Office: 620,001 sq ft (57,600.0 m^{2})
- Lifts/elevators: 19

Design and construction
- Architect(s): Skidmore, Owings and Merrill

400 Poydras Tower, formerly known as the Texaco Center, located at 400 Poydras Street in the Central Business District of New Orleans, Louisiana, is a 32-story, 442 feet (135 m)-tall skyscraper. Built in 1983, this modern office tower features more than 620,000 square feet (58,000 m^{2}) of office space with an average of 22,000 rentable square feet per floor. The building is leased by Beau Box Commercial Real Estate.

== See also ==
- List of tallest buildings in New Orleans
- List of tallest buildings in Louisiana
