= Louisiana–Monroe Warhawks =

Collegiate sports club in the United States

- University: University of Louisiana at Monroe
- Conference: Sun Belt
- NCAA: Division I (FBS)
- Athletic director: S. J. Tuohy
- Location: Monroe, Louisiana
- Varsity teams: 15 (6 men, 9 women)
- Football stadium: Malone Stadium
- Basketball arena: Fant–Ewing Coliseum
- Baseball stadium: Lou St. Amant Field
- Softball stadium: ULM Softball Complex
- Soccer stadium: Groseclose Track at Brown Stadium
- Other venues: Bayou Desiard Country Club; Raymond Heard Stadium; Selman Field Cross Country Course; ULM Beach Volleyball Courts
- Mascot: Ace the Warhawk
- Nickname: Warhawks
- Fight song: Cheer for ULM Warhawks
- Colors: Maroon and gold
- Website: ulmwarhawks.com/index.aspx

The Louisiana–Monroe Warhawks (ULM Warhawks) are the intercollegiate athletics teams representing the University of Louisiana at Monroe (ULM). ULM currently fields 15 varsity teams (six men's and nine women's) in 11 sports and competes at the National Collegiate Athletic Association (NCAA) Division I (Football Bowl Subdivision in football) level as a member of the Sun Belt Conference.

== Nickname ==
The nickname for the Louisiana–Monroe sports teams are the Warhawks. Historically, the athletic program used Indians as their mascot.

On January 30, 2006, university president James Cofer announced officially that ULM would be retiring the 75-year-old "Indians" identity in light of new NCAA restrictions against Indigenous-themed mascots, which the NCAA considers "hostile and abusive" to Native Americans, despite issuing an appeal to the NCAA to keep the name after the NCAA's ruling allowing Florida State to keep their Seminoles nickname. This came a few days after a mascot committee voted unanimously in favor of the change. The university accepted suggestions for the new mascot through February 28, 2006. The mascot committee then selected 12 semifinalists.

An online poll, available to students, faculty, staff, alumni, donors and the public, yielded three semifinalists: "Warhawks," "Bayou Gators" and "Bayou Hawks." The school's mascot committee passed a single recommendation to the university president, who made the final decision. Warhawks was announced as ULM's new mascot on April 5, 2006 and implemented on June 26, 2006. The new nickname honors Maj. Gen. Claire Lee Chennault, an LSU alumnus, and his Air Force unit from World War II, which utilized the Curtiss P-40 Warhawk in battle, although the logos primarily use bird imagery. University president Carrie L. Castille explained in 2025 that the name is a nod to both the bird and plane by honoring the "vision, precision, and adaptability of the hawk and the legacy of the P-40 Warhawk".

== Sports sponsored ==
Sun Belt Conference logo in Louisiana–Monroe's colors

Men's sports	Women's sports
Baseball	Basketball
Basketball	Beach volleyball
Cross country	Cross country
Football	Golf
Golf	Soccer
Track and field^{1}	Softball
	Tennis
	Track and field^{1}
	Volleyball
^{1} – Track and field includes both indoor and outdoor

=== Baseball ===
The baseball team is coached by Mike Federico, and won the 2008 Sun Belt Conference Championship. The team's home field is Warhawk Field. In 2012, the Warhawks won the Sun Belt Conference Baseball Tournament and earned the conference's automatic bid to play in the NCAA Division I baseball tournament. The ULM Warhawks have won 14 baseball regular season or tournament conference championships.

=== Women's beach volleyball ===
The Louisiana–Monroe Warhawks women's beach volleyball team competes in NCAA Division I beach volleyball in the Sun Belt Conference since 2023. The Warhawks previously were affiliate members of Conference USA (C-USA) from 2021–2022. The program, founded in 2013, competed as an independent until joining the Coastal Collegiate Sports Association for the 2020 season (2019–20 school year).

=== Football ===
The Warhawks college football team dates back to 1931, and currently competes in the NCAA Football Bowl Subdivision. Playing as a member of the Sun Belt Conference (Sun Belt), the Warhawks play their home games at Malone Stadium, located on the campus. Since December 2015, Matt Viator has served as the Warhawks' head coach. As the Indians, Monroe captured or shared four Southland Conference championships and won the 1987 I-AA National Championship.

The program has sent several players into the professional ranks, including Stan Humphries, Bubby Brister, Chris Harris, Doug Pederson, Marty Booker, Teddy Garcia, Roosevelt Potts, Joe Profit, Cardia Jackson and Smokey Stover into the National Football League, Steven Jyles into the Canadian Football League and Raymond Philyaw into the Arena League.

2012 was the first season since moving to the Football Bowl Subdivision that Louisiana–Monroe had a winning season.

=== Men's basketball ===
Men's and women's basketball teams play home games at Fant-Ewing Coliseum, a 7,000-seat on-campus arena that opened in 1971. The largest crowd to watch a men's basketball game at Fant-Ewing Coliseum was 8,044, who watched the Northeast Louisiana Indians play the Louisiana Tech Bulldogs on January 25, 1979.

The ULM Warhawks have won 19 men's basketball regular season, tournament or divisional conference championships.

=== Women's basketball ===
The largest crowd to watch a women's basketball game at Fant-Ewing Coliseum was 8,155, who watched the Northeast Louisiana Lady Indians play the Louisiana Tech Lady Techsters on February 11, 1985. The ULM Warhawks have won five women's basketball regular season or tournament conference championships.

=== Men's cross country ===
The ULM Warhawks have won five men's cross country conference championships.

=== Women's cross country ===
The ULM Warhawks have won two women's cross country conference championships.

=== Men's golf ===
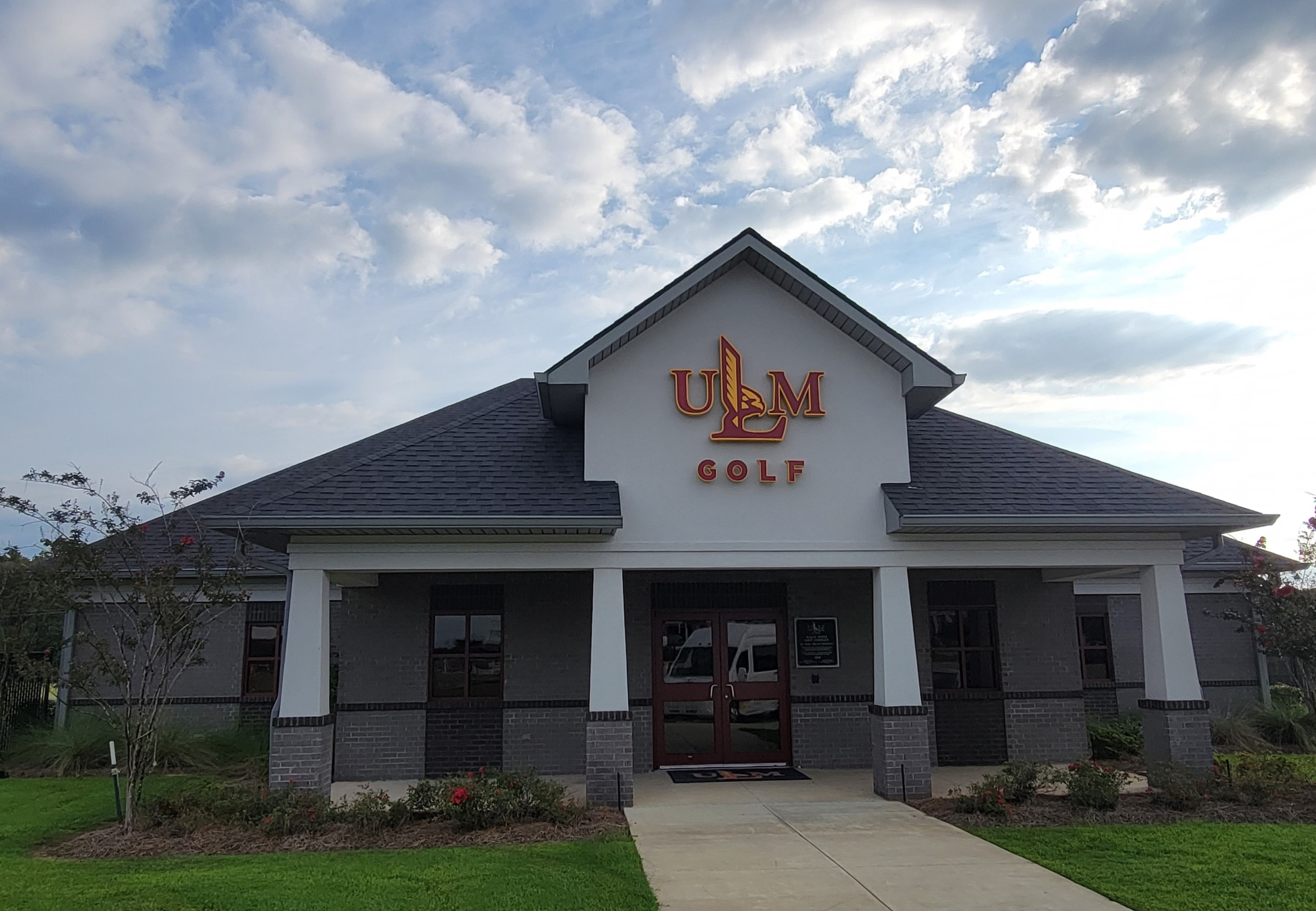
ULM Golf clubhouse

The ULM Warhawks have won two men's golf conference championships.

=== Softball ===
The ULM Warhawks have won two softball regular season or tournament conference championships.

=== Women's tennis ===
The ULM Warhawks have won nine women's tennis regular season or tournament conference championships.

=== Men's track and field ===
The ULM Warhawks have won nine men's outdoor track & field conference championships. It was announced on ULM's athletic website on June 17, 2025 that the university would discontinue women's tennis effective immediately.

=== Women's track and field ===
The ULM Warhawks have won four women's outdoor track & field conference championships.

== Non-varsity sports ==
=== Water skiing ===
The University of Louisiana at Monroe Water Ski Team has been the dominant ski team since the inception of collegiate water ski competition in 1979, capturing 29 National Championship titles over the past 38 years.

== Championships ==
=== NCAA team championships ===
As of April 4, 2016, Louisiana Monroe has 1 NCAA team national championship.

- Men's (1)
  - Football (1): 1987
- See also:
  - Sun Belt Conference NCAA team championships
  - List of NCAA schools with the most NCAA Division I championships

=== Conference championships ===
The ULM Warhawks have won 75 men's and 24 women's regular-season, tournament or divisional conference championships.

- Men's
  - Basketball (19): 2007^{D}, 1997, 1996, 1996^{T}, 1994, 1993, 1993^{T}, 1992^{T} 1991, 1991^{T}, 1990, 1990^{T}, 1986, 1986^{T}, 1982^{T}, 1980, 1979^{T}, 1965, 1962
  - Tennis (18): 1997, 1996, 1995^{T} 1994, 1993, 1992, 1990, 1989, 1988, 1987, 1985, 1984, 1982, 1981, 1980, 1965, 1964, 1963
  - Baseball (14): 2012^{T}, 2008, 2002, 2000, 1999, 1996, 1995^{T}, 1983, 1982, 1970, 1969, 1968, 1966, 1964
  - Outdoor Track & Field (9): 1988, 1987, 1970, 1969, 1964, 1963, 1962, 1960, 1959
  - Football (5): 2005, 1992, 1990, 1987, 1982
  - Cross Country (5): 1965, 1964, 1962, 1961, 1959
  - Indoor Track & Field (3): 1988, 1987, 1986
  - Golf (2): 2004, 1968
- Women's
  - Women's Tennis (9): 2017, 2003^{T}, 1997, 1996, 1995, 1993, 1992, 1991, 1984
  - Women's Basketball (5): 2005, 1987, 1985, 1984, 1983^{T}
  - Women's Outdoor Track and Field (4): 1989, 1988, 1987, 1986
  - Softball (2): 1997, 1986^{T}
  - Women's Indoor Track & Field (2): 1989, 1987
  - Women's Cross Country (2): 1986, 1985

^{T} indicates a conference tournament championship. ^{D} indicates a divisional conference championship.

== Athletic facilities ==
Athletic venues and facilities include:

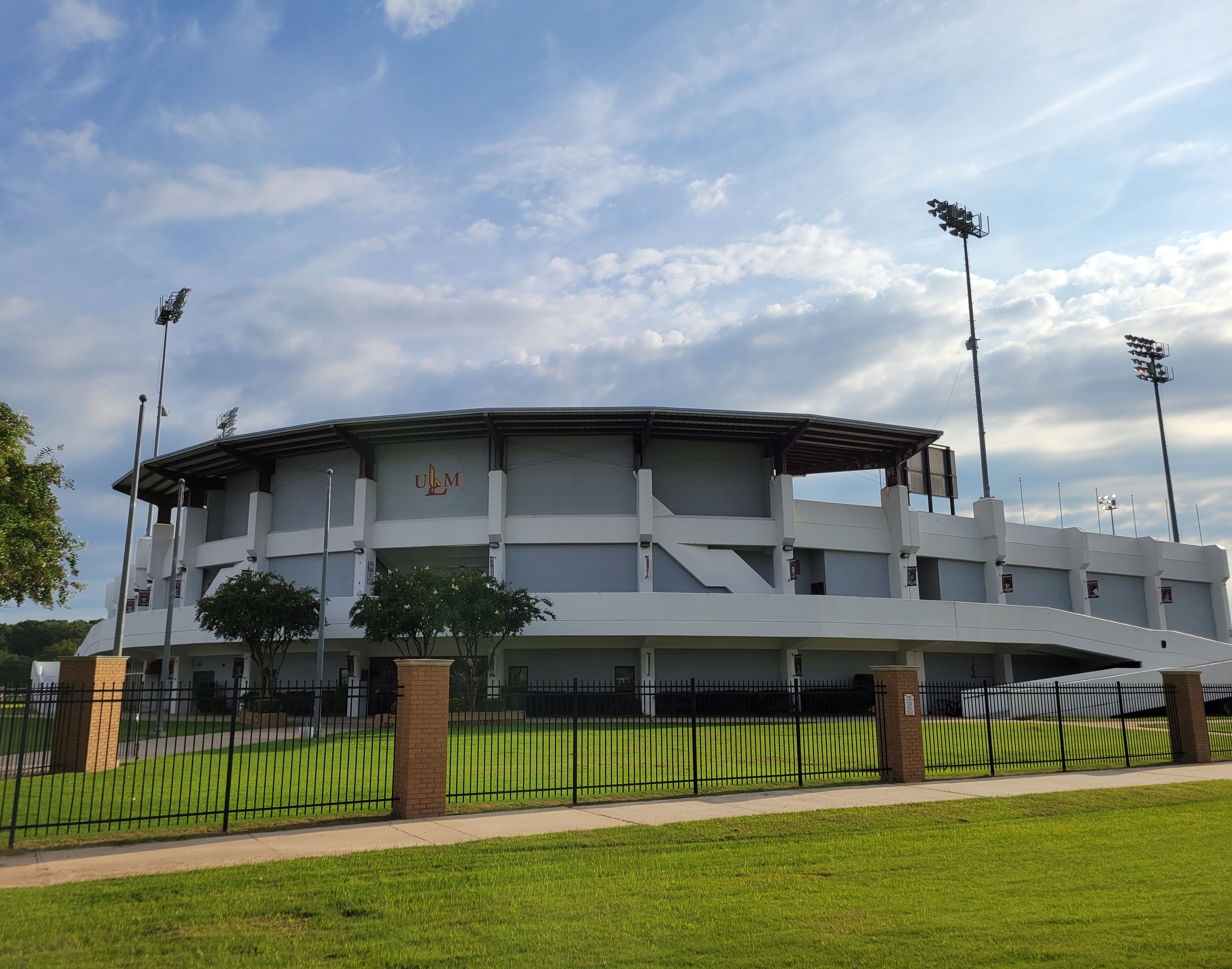
Lou St. Amant Field

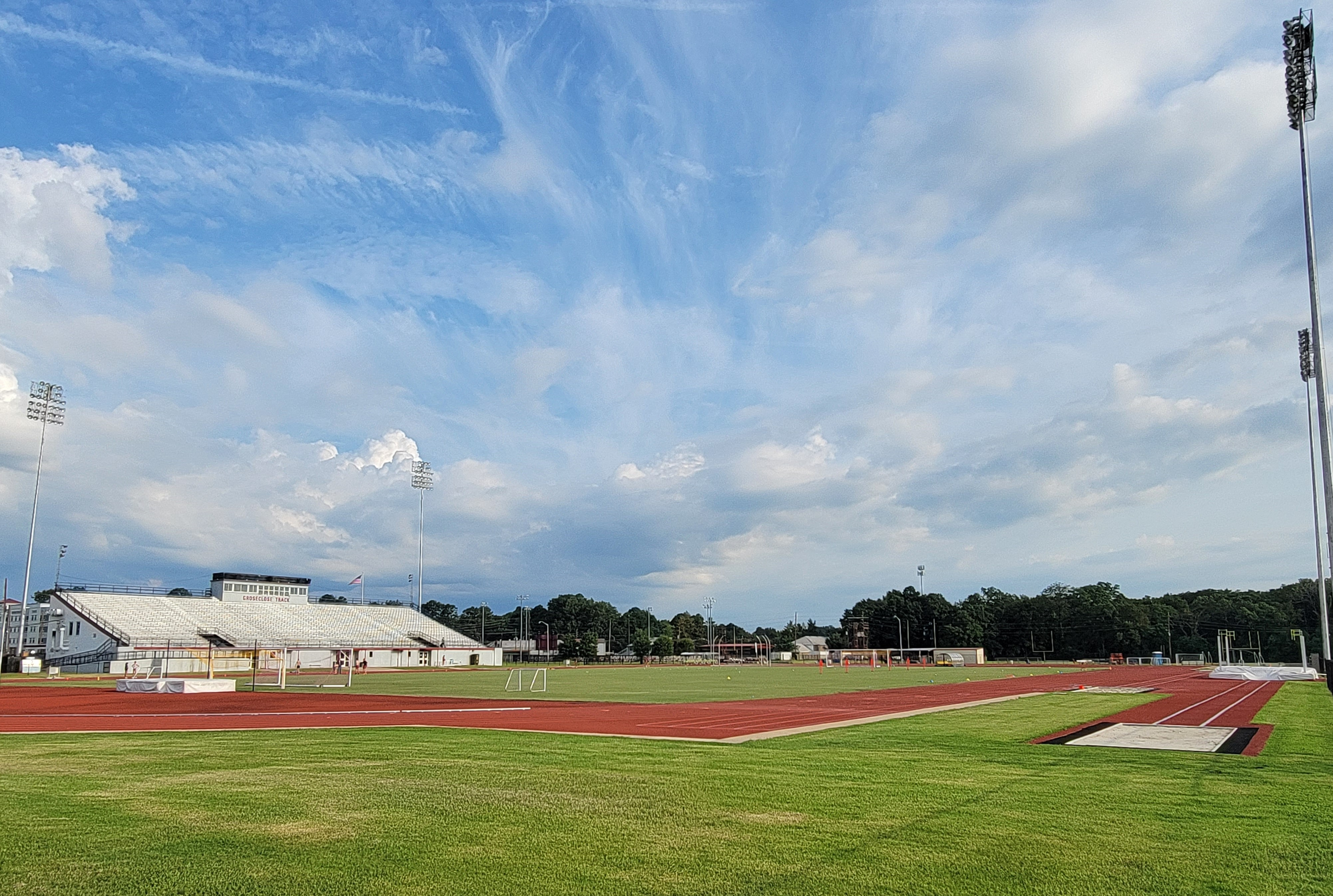
Brown Stadium

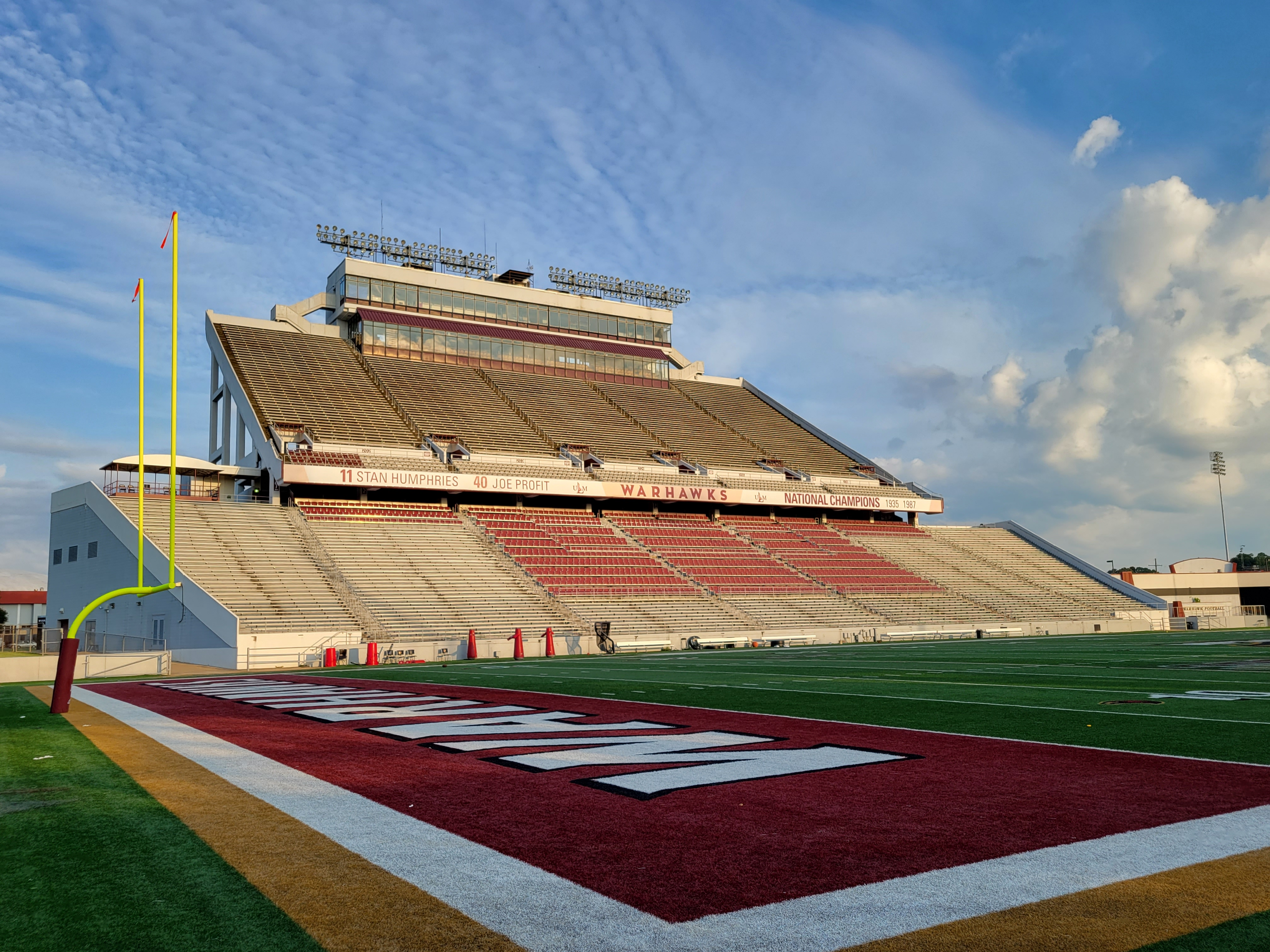
Malone Stadium

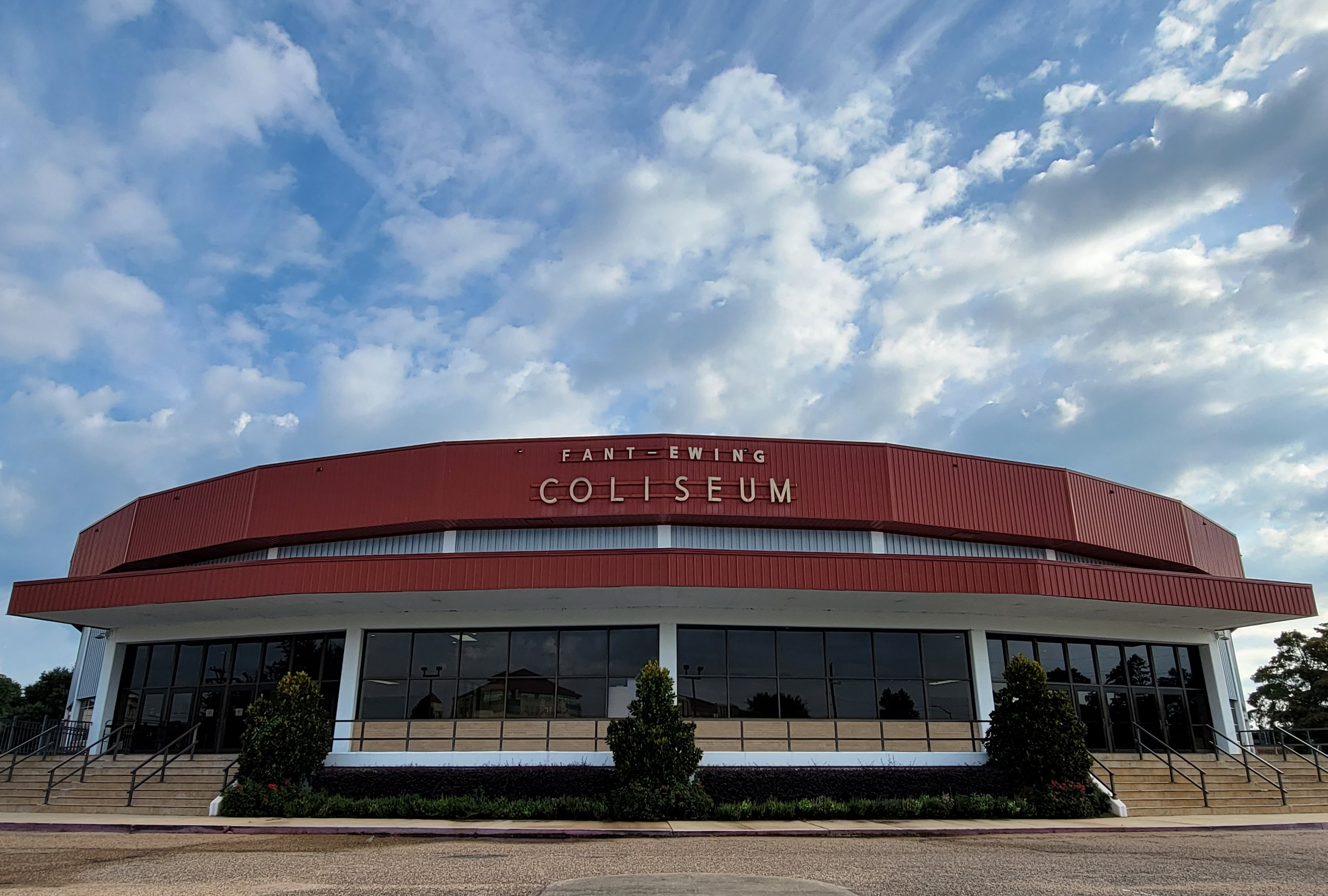
Fant–Ewing Coliseum

Venue	Sport
Malone Stadium	Football
Fant–Ewing Coliseum	Basketball
Fant–Ewing Coliseum	Volleyball
Lou St. Amant Field	Baseball
ULM Beach Volleyball Courts	Beach volleyball
Selman Field Course	Cross country
Bayou Desiard Country Club (Note: Not owned by the University)	Golf
Brown Stadium	Soccer
Brown Stadium	Track and field
ULM Softball Complex	Softball
Raymond Heard Stadium	Tennis

== Rivalries ==
The Warhawks have Sun Belt rivalries with every West Division school (Little Rock, Arkansas State, Louisiana, UT Arlington, and Texas State). Their fiercest Sun Belt rivals are Arkansas State Red Wolves and Louisiana Ragin' Cajuns.

=== Football ===
Football rivalries involving Warhawk sports teams include:

Teams		Rivalry name	Trophy	Meetings	Record	Series leader	Current streak
Arkansas State Red Wolves	ULM		–	42	14–28	Arkansas State	Arkansas State won 11
Louisiana Ragin Cajuns	ULM	Battle on the Bayou	Wooden Boot	56	25–31	Louisiana	Louisiana won 3
Louisiana Tech Bulldogs	ULM	Louisiana Tech–Louisiana–Monroe football rivalry	–	43	13–30	Louisiana Tech	Louisiana Tech won 8
Northwestern State Demons	ULM	Louisiana–Monroe–Northwestern State football rivalry	–	48	19–28–1	Northwestern State	Northwestern State won 2

== Warhawks Sports Radio Network ==
ULM launched the Warhawk Sports Radio Network in 2007. The Network is a series of radio stations that provide access to sporting events throughout Northeast Louisiana. Three Monroe radio stations, KLIP, KMLB and KRJO, provide play by play radio commentary. The full list of participating stations are:

- KLIP 105.3 FM in Monroe (Football, Men's basketball)
- KMLB 105.7 FM / 540 AM in Monroe (Women's basketball, Baseball)
- KRJO 1680 AM in Monroe (Basketball)

== See also ==
- List of NCAA Division I institutions
