= Battle on the Bayou =

College football rivalry between two Louisiana colleges

- Louisiana Ragin' Cajuns Louisiana–Monroe Warhawks
- Sport: Football
- First meeting: September 15, 1951; Northeast Louisiana State, 13–7
- Latest meeting: November 12, 2026; Louisiana, 42–21
- Next meeting: 2027
- Trophy: Wooden Boot (Since 2002)

Statistics
- Total meetings: 62
- All-time series: Louisiana leads, 36–26 (Note: In 2015, Louisiana–Lafayette vacated eight wins from their 2011 football season, including their win over Louisiana–Monroe, due to alleged major NCAA violations. See Wikipedia:WikiProject College football/Vacated victories for an explanation of how vacated victories are recorded.)
- Trophy series: Louisiana leads, 17–8
- Largest victory: Louisiana, 70–20 (2020)
- Longest win streak: Louisiana, 5 (1969–1979, 2008–2012)
- Current win streak: Louisiana, 4 (2023–present)

Locations of Louisiana and Louisiana–Monroe

The Battle on the Bayou is the name given to the college football rivalry between the Louisiana Ragin' Cajuns and the Louisiana–Monroe Warhawks. They are both NCAA Division I FBS members of the Sun Belt Conference and coincide under the University of Louisiana System.

== History ==
Through the 2025 season, this intrastate rivalry had been played 61 times. The Louisiana Ragin' Cajuns led the series 35–26, excluding their vacated 2011 win. The Battle on the Bayou is a rivalry not just in football, but in all sports when the Cajuns and Warhawks meet.

College Comparison
	UL Lafayette	UL Monroe
Ownership	University of Louisiana System	
Location	Lafayette, Louisiana	Monroe, Louisiana
Conference	Sun Belt Conference	Sun Belt Conference
Students	16,934	8,854
School colors		
Nickname	Ragin' Cajuns	Warhawks
Mascot(s)	Cayenne	Ace
Football stadium	Cajun Field	Malone Stadium
Basketball arena	Cajundome	Fant–Ewing Coliseum
Baseball park	Russo Park	Lou St. Amant Field
Softball park	Lamson Park	Geo-Surfaces Field

== Game results ==
Louisiana victories	Louisiana–Monroe victories	Vacated wins

No.	Date	Location	Winner	Score
1	September 15, 1951	Lafayette, LA	Northeast Louisiana State	13–7
2	November 28, 1953	Monroe, LA	Northeast Louisiana State	35–6
3	October 9, 1954	Lafayette, LA	Southwestern Louisiana	41–7
4	October 8, 1955	Monroe, LA	Southwestern Louisiana	26–6
5	October 6, 1956	Lafayette, LA	Northeast Louisiana State	45–19
6	October 5, 1957	Monroe, LA	Southwestern Louisiana	6–0
7	October 4, 1958	Lafayette, LA	Northeast Louisiana State	29–8
8	October 31, 1959	Monroe, LA	Northeast Louisiana State	34–20
9	October 29, 1960	Lafayette, LA	Southwestern Louisiana	8–7
10	October 28, 1961	Shreveport, LA	Northeast Louisiana State	27–20
11	October 27, 1962	Shreveport, LA	Southwestern Louisiana	18–10
12	November 9, 1963	Monroe, LA	Northeast Louisiana State	7–6
13	November 7, 1964	Lafayette, LA	Southwestern Louisiana	23–7
14	November 6, 1965	Lafayette, LA	Southwestern Louisiana	14–10
15	October 29, 1966	Monroe, LA	Northeast Louisiana State	10–7
16	October 28, 1967	Lafayette, LA	Northeast Louisiana State	17–6
17	November 2, 1968	Monroe, LA	Northeast Louisiana State	20–7
18	November 1, 1969	Lafayette, LA	Southwestern Louisiana	9–7
19	October 31, 1970	Monroe, LA	Southwestern Louisiana	9–7
20	October 30, 1971	Lafayette, LA	Southwestern Louisiana	31–7
21	November 27, 1976	Lafayette, LA	Southwestern Louisiana	7–5
22	September 1, 1979	Lafayette, LA	Southwestern Louisiana	17–13
23	September 27, 1980	Monroe, LA	Northeast Louisiana	24–0
24	September 19, 1981	Monroe, LA	Northeast Louisiana	20–17
25	November 6, 1982	Lafayette, LA	Southwestern Louisiana	40–25
26	September 10, 1983	Monroe, LA	Northeast Louisiana	31–6
27	September 15, 1984	Lafayette, LA	Northeast Louisiana	7–6
28	September 13, 1986	Lafayette, LA	Southwestern Louisiana	24–20
29	October 24, 1987	Monroe, LA	Southwestern Louisiana	17–7
30	September 30, 1989	Monroe, LA	Southwestern Louisiana	24–10
31	August 31, 1991	Lafayette, LA	Northeast Louisiana	21–10
32	September 12, 1992	Lafayette, LA	Southwestern Louisiana	31–23

No.	Date	Location	Winner	Score
33	October 25, 1997	Lafayette, LA	Northeast Louisiana	28–21
34	November 7, 1998	Monroe, LA	Northeast Louisiana	34–24
35	October 23, 1999	Lafayette, LA	Louisiana–Monroe	31–7
36	November 4, 2000	Monroe, LA	Louisiana–Lafayette	21–18
37	October 27, 2001	Lafayette, LA	Louisiana–Lafayette	17–12
38	November 23, 2002	Monroe, LA	Louisiana–Monroe	34–10
39	October 11, 2003	Lafayette, LA	Louisiana–Monroe	45–42
40	November 20, 2004	Monroe, LA	Louisiana–Monroe	13–10
41	November 26, 2005	Monroe, LA	Louisiana–Lafayette	54–21
42	December 2, 2006	Lafayette, LA	Louisiana–Monroe	39–20
43	November 24, 2007	Lafayette, LA	Louisiana–Monroe	17–11
44	October 4, 2008	Monroe, LA	Louisiana–Lafayette	44–35
45	November 21, 2009	Lafayette, LA	Louisiana–Lafayette	21–17
46	November 27, 2010	Monroe, LA	Louisiana–Lafayette	23–22
47	November 5, 2011	Lafayette, LA	Louisiana–Lafayette	36–35
48	November 3, 2012	Monroe, LA	Louisiana–Lafayette	40–24
49	November 30, 2013	Lafayette, LA	Louisiana–Monroe	31–28
50	November 15, 2014	Monroe, LA	Louisiana–Lafayette	34–27
51	October 31, 2015	Lafayette, LA	Louisiana–Lafayette	30–24
52	December 3, 2016	Monroe, LA	Louisiana–Lafayette	30–3
53	September 23, 2017	Lafayette, LA	Louisiana–Monroe	56–50^{2OT}
54	November 24, 2018	Monroe, LA	Louisiana	31–28
55	November 30, 2019	Lafayette, LA	Louisiana	31–30
56	November 28, 2020	Monroe, LA	#23 Louisiana	70–20
57	November 27, 2021	Lafayette, LA	#23 Louisiana	21–16
58	September 24, 2022	Monroe, LA	Louisiana–Monroe	21–17
59	November 25, 2023	Lafayette, LA	Louisiana	52–21
60	November 30, 2024	Monroe, LA	Louisiana	37–23
61	November 29, 2025	Lafayette, LA	Louisiana	30–27^{OT}
62	November 12, 2026	Monroe, LA	Louisiana	42–21
Series: Louisiana leads 36–26

== See also ==
- List of NCAA college football rivalry games
