= KNOE =

KNOE may refer to:

- KNOE-TV, a CBS-affiliate television station (channel 8 digital) licensed to Monroe, Louisiana, United States, and its associated ABC subchannel
- KMVX, a radio station (101.9 FM) licensed to Monroe, Louisiana, United States, which held the call sign KNOE-FM from 1967 to March 2013
- KMLB, a radio station (540 AM) licensed to Monroe, Louisiana, United States, which held the call sign KNOE from 1944 to March 2008
