= KSBU =

- Delta, Louisiana; United States
- Broadcast area: Vicksburg, Mississippi
- Frequency: 92.7 MHz
- Branding: 92.7 The Touch

Programming
- Language: English
- Format: Urban adult contemporary
- Affiliations: Premiere Networks; Westwood One

Ownership
- Owner: The Radio People; (Holladay Broadcasting of Louisiana, LLC)
- Sister stations: KLSM, WBBV

History
- First air date: August 26, 2010

Technical information
- Licensing authority: FCC
- Facility ID: 183340
- Class: A
- ERP: 4,300 watts
- HAAT: 118 meters (387 ft)
- Transmitter coordinates: 32°22′13″N 91°07′39″W

Links
- Public license information: Public file; LMS
- Webcast: Listen live
- Website: 927thetouch.com

KSBU (92.7 MHz, "92.7 The Touch") is a radio station licensed to serve the community of Delta, Louisiana. The station is owned by Holladay Broadcasting of Louisiana, LLC, and airs an urban adult contemporary format.

The station was assigned the KSBU call letters by the Federal Communications Commission on August 26, 2010.
