= KLSM =

Coordinates: 32°22′13″N 91°07′39″W

- Tallulah, Louisiana; United States
- Broadcast area: Vicksburg, Mississippi
- Frequency: 104.5 MHz
- Branding: K-Hits 104.5

Programming
- Language: English
- Format: Contemporary hit radio

Ownership
- Owner: The Radio People; (Holladay Broadcasting of Louisiana, LLC)
- Sister stations: KSBU, WBBV

History
- First air date: October 18, 1982
- Former call signs: KBYO (1982-2006)

Technical information
- Licensing authority: FCC
- Facility ID: 60001
- Class: C3
- ERP: 25,000 watts
- HAAT: 100 meters (330 ft)

Links
- Public license information: Public file; LMS
- Website: official website

KLSM (104.5 MHz, "K-Hits 104.5") is an American radio station licensed to Tallulah, Louisiana. The station broadcasts a Top 40 (CHR) format in the Vicksburg area and is owned by Holladay Broadcasting of Louisiana, LLC.
