= KMLB (1440 AM) =

- Monroe, Louisiana; United States
- Frequency: 1440 kHz

History
- First air date: July 1, 1930
- Last air date: February 29, 2008
- Former call signs: KMLB (1930–1986); KWEZ (1986–1989); KJLO (1989–1991)
- Call sign meaning: "Know Monroe, Louisiana, Better."

Technical information
- Facility ID: 48636
- Class: B
- Power: 5,000 watts (day); 1,000 watts (night)

KMLB (1440 AM) was a commercial radio station licensed to Monroe, Louisiana. It debuted in 1930, and was deleted in 2008.

== History ==
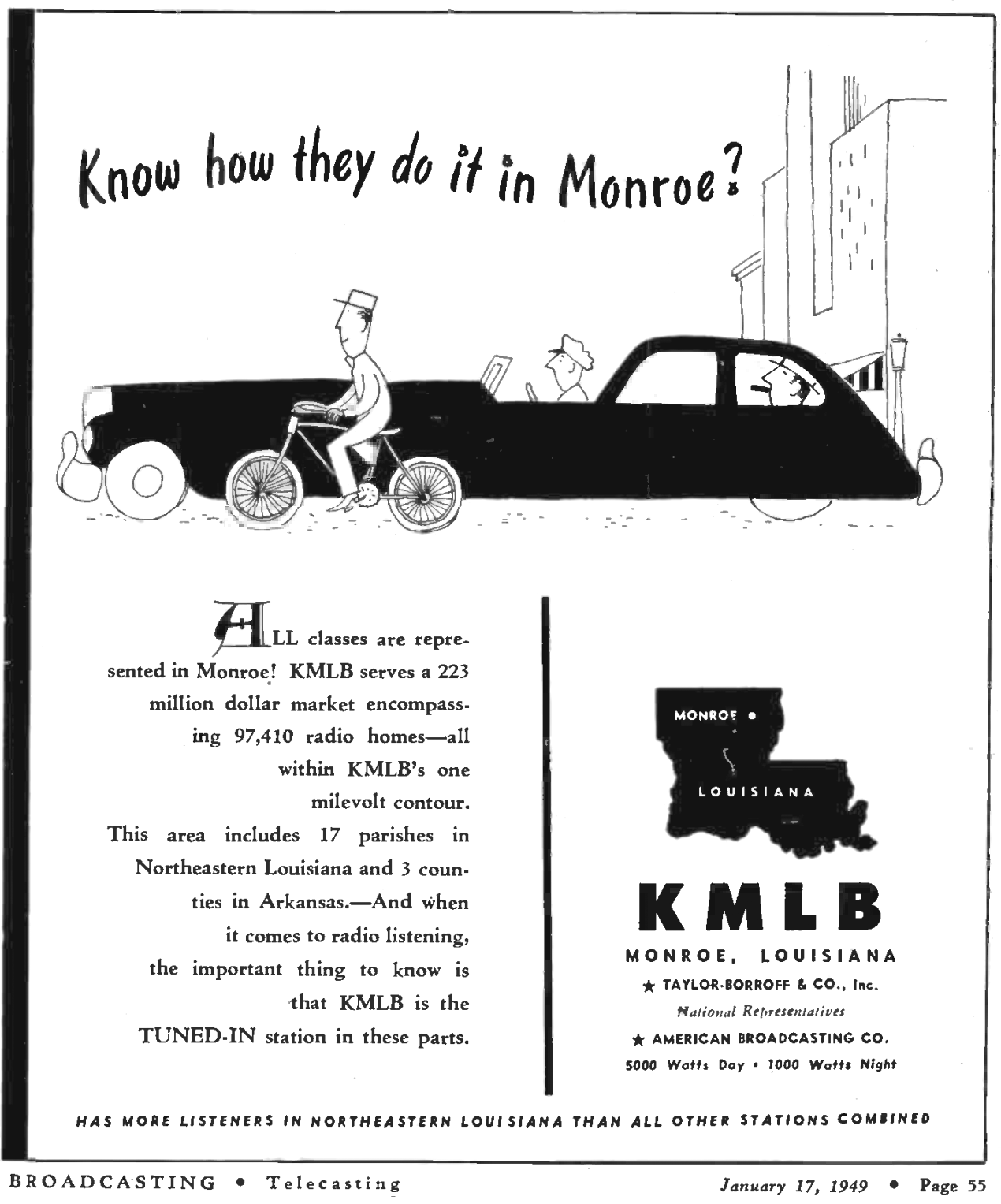
KMLB advertisement (1949)

The station was first licensed in 1930, as KMLB, to J. C. Liner at 512 South Grand Street in Monroe, Louisiana, for 50 watts on 1200 kHz. KMLB first signed on on July 1, 1930. It was founded by the Liner family of Monroe. In July 1946, the station signed on an FM sister station, KMLB-FM, eventually broadcasting on 104.1 MHz (now KJLO-FM).

The station call letters were changed to KWEZ on March 3, 1986, to KJLO on February 28, 1989, and back to the original KMLB on January 18, 1991.

=== Expanded Band assignment ===
On March 17, 1997 the Federal Communications Commission (FCC) announced that 88 stations had been given permission to move to newly available "Expanded Band" transmitting frequencies, ranging from 1610 to 1700 kHz, with KMLB authorized to move from 1440 kHz to 1680 kHz.

A construction permit for the expanded band station was assigned the call letters KBJE (now KRJO) on September 4, 1998. The FCC's initial policy was that both the original station and its expanded band counterpart could operate simultaneously for up to five years, after which owners would have to turn in one of the two licenses, depending on whether they preferred the new assignment or elected to remain on the original frequency. However, this deadline was extended multiple times, and both stations continued to be authorized beyond the initial time limit.

=== Later history ===
In November 2006, the Noe family reached an agreement to sell KNOE on 540 kHz to Clay Holladay's Holladay Broadcasting. At the time, the FCC noted that "The conditional grant... required Holladay to surrender the license for the station that at the time bore call sign KMLB (AM) ('Old KMLB'), Monroe, Louisiana, prior to Holladay consummating its acquisition" of KNOE. Thus, the original KMLB on 1440 AM was taken off the air on February 29, with its license surrendered to the FCC on March 4, 2008. Thirteen days later, the call letters on 540 AM were changed from KNOE to KMLB, and programming previously on 1440 AM was consolidated to the transferred KMLB.
