= WBBV =

- Vicksburg, Mississippi; United States
- Broadcast area: Warren County, Mississippi
- Frequency: 101.3 MHz (HD Radio)
- Branding: River 101.3

Programming
- Language: English
- Format: Country
- Affiliations: Westwood One

Ownership
- Owner: The Radio People; (Holladay Broadcasting of Louisiana, LLC)
- Sister stations: KLSM, KSBU

History
- First air date: October 13, 1999

Technical information
- Licensing authority: FCC
- Facility ID: 5370
- Class: C3
- ERP: 13,000 watts
- HAAT: 120 meters (390 ft)
- Transmitter coordinates: 32°20′42″N 90°52′55″W

Links
- Public license information: Public file; LMS
- Website: river101.com

WBBV (101.3 MHz, "River 101.3") is an American radio station broadcasting a country music format. Licensed to Vicksburg, Mississippi, United States, the station is currently owned by Robert H. Holladay, through licensee Holladay Broadcasting of Louisiana, L.L.C., and features programming from Westwood One.
