= KMYQ =

KMYQ may refer to:

- KMYQ (FM), a defunct radio station (97.1 FM) formerly licensed to serve North English, Iowa, United States
- KRVV, a radio station (100.1 FM) licensed to serve Bastrop, Louisiana, United States, which held the KMYQ-FM call sign from 1987 to 1991
- KZJO, a television station (channel 22) licensed to Seattle, Washington, United States, which held the call sign KMYQ from 2006 to 2010
