= B1Bank Fant Coliseum =

Multi-purpose arena in Monroe, Louisiana

b1BANK Fant Coliseum
- The Coliseum
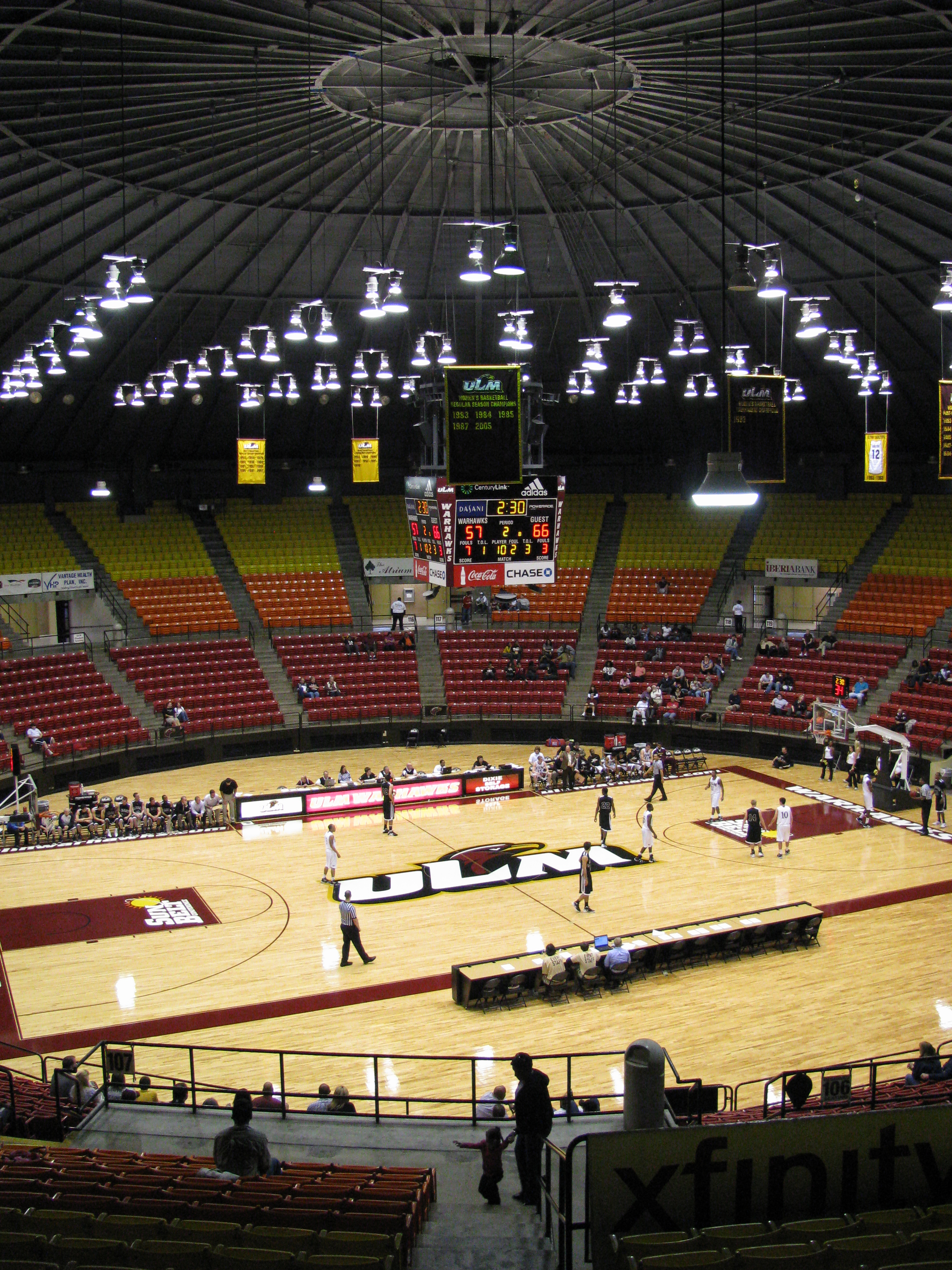
- Interior, November 2011
- Interactive map of b1BANK Fant Coliseum
- Former names: Fant–Ewing Coliseum (2000–2026); Ewing Coliseum (1971–2000)
- Location: 4319 Northeast Drive; Monroe, Louisiana; United States
- Coordinates: 32.531°N 92.069°W
- Owner: University of Louisiana at Monroe
- Operator: University of Louisiana at Monroe
- Capacity: 7,085
- Surface: Maple

Construction
- Opened: 1971
- Cost: $2.7 million ($21.5 million in 2025 dollars)

Tenants
- Louisiana–Monroe Warhawks (NCAA); Men's basketball (1971–present); Women's basketball (1974–present); Women's volleyball (1982–present)

b1BANK Fant Coliseum is a 7,085-seat multi-purpose arena in Monroe, Louisiana, United States, on the campus of the University of Louisiana at Monroe. It was built in 1971 and is home to the Louisiana–Monroe Warhawks men's and women's basketball teams and women's volleyball team. The arena also hosts concerts and events.

== History ==
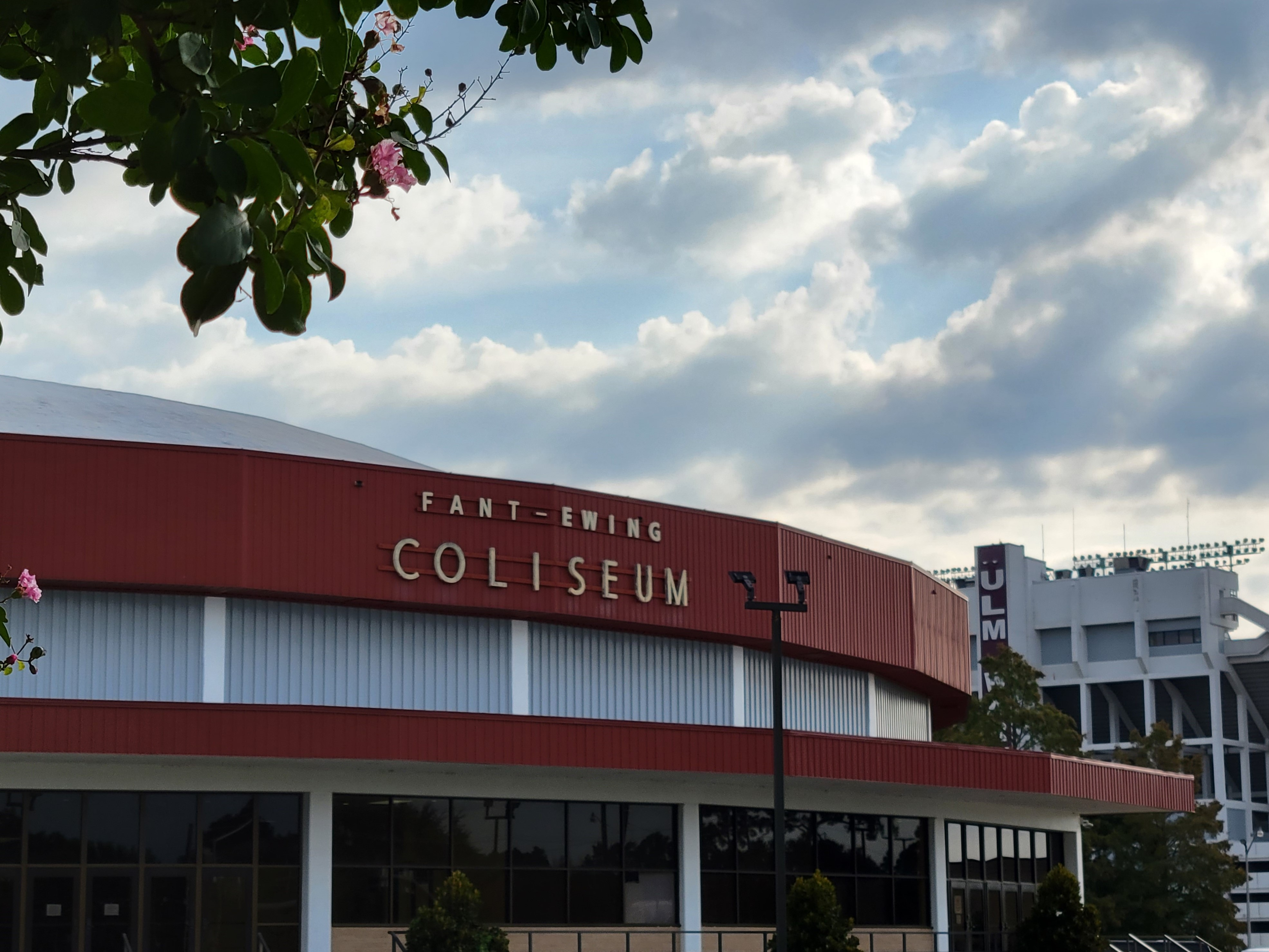
Exterior view of Fant–Ewing Coliseum

The first men's basketball game played in Fant-Ewing was on December 1, 1971, against Sam Houston State, who defeated ULM 71–70. The Bearkats' Mike Newell made the first free throw of a two-shot foul with no time left on the clock to the disappointment of an opening night capacity crowd.

It has hosted the Southland Conference men's basketball tournament five times and the Atlantic Sun Conference men's basketball tournament three times.

During the 2006–07 season, a student-only section was created, named the "Hawk's Nest".

== Gallery ==
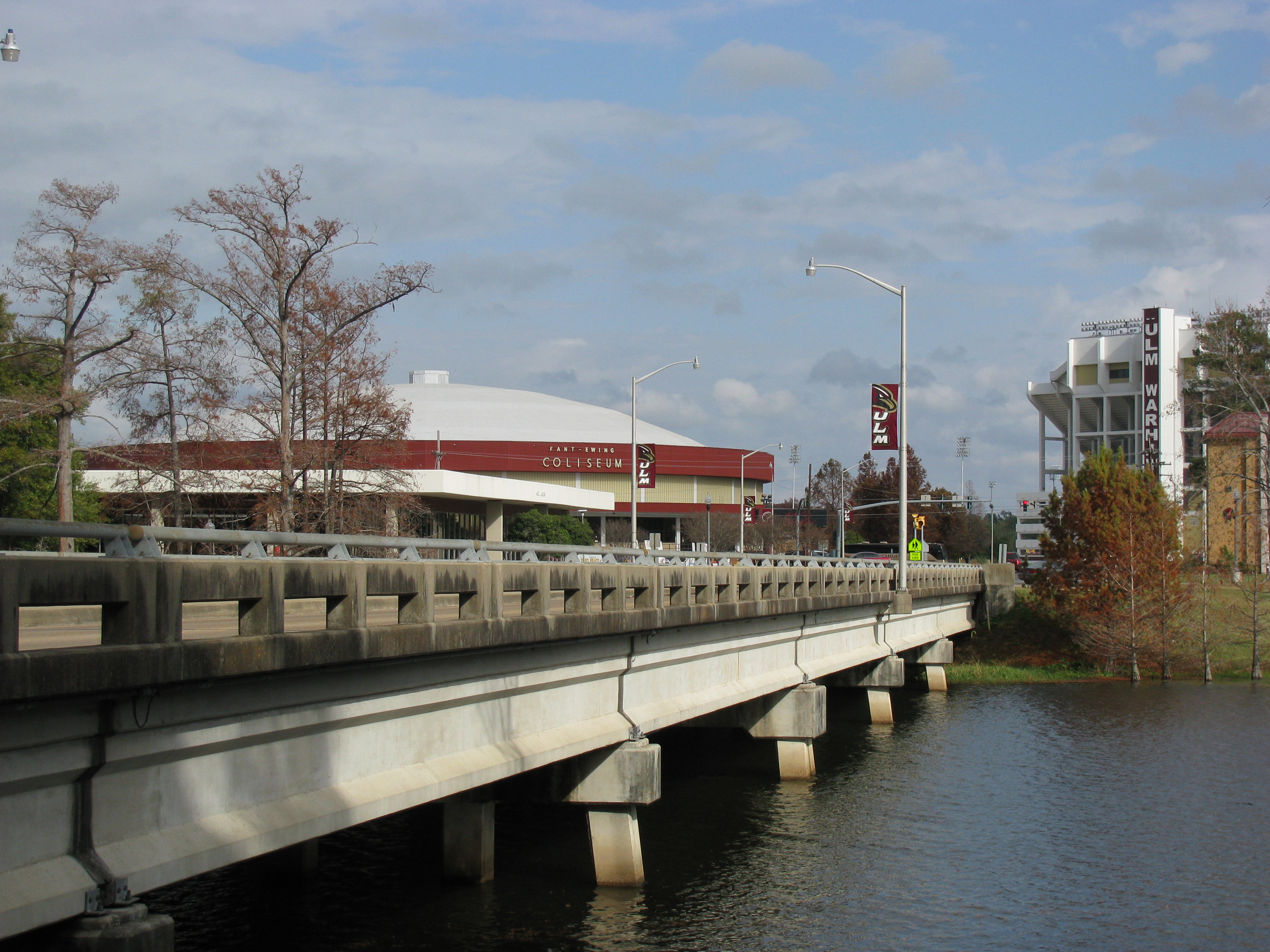
Fant–Ewing Coliseum and JPS Field at Malone Stadium from Bayou Desiard

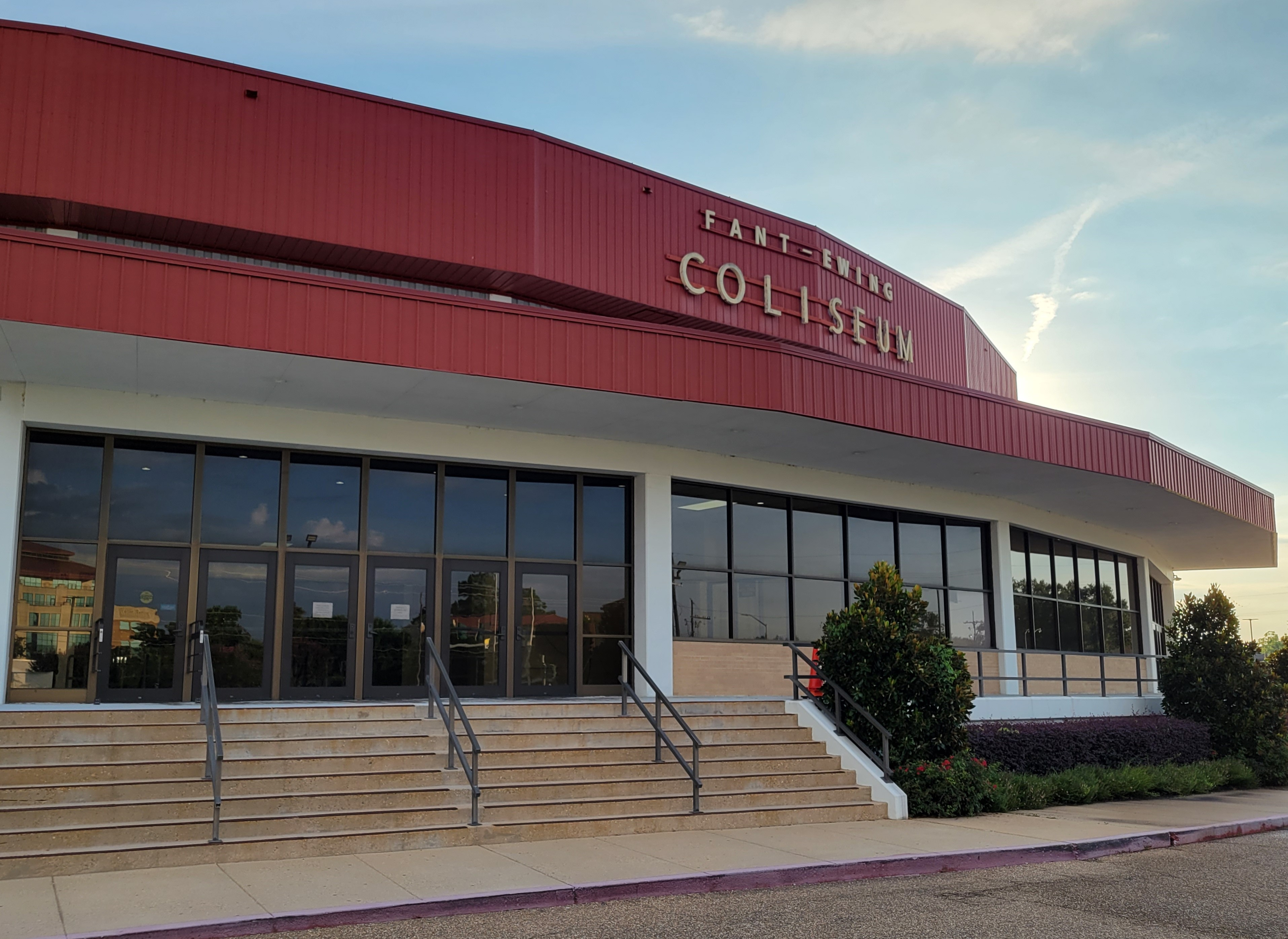
Fant–Ewing Coliseum exterior

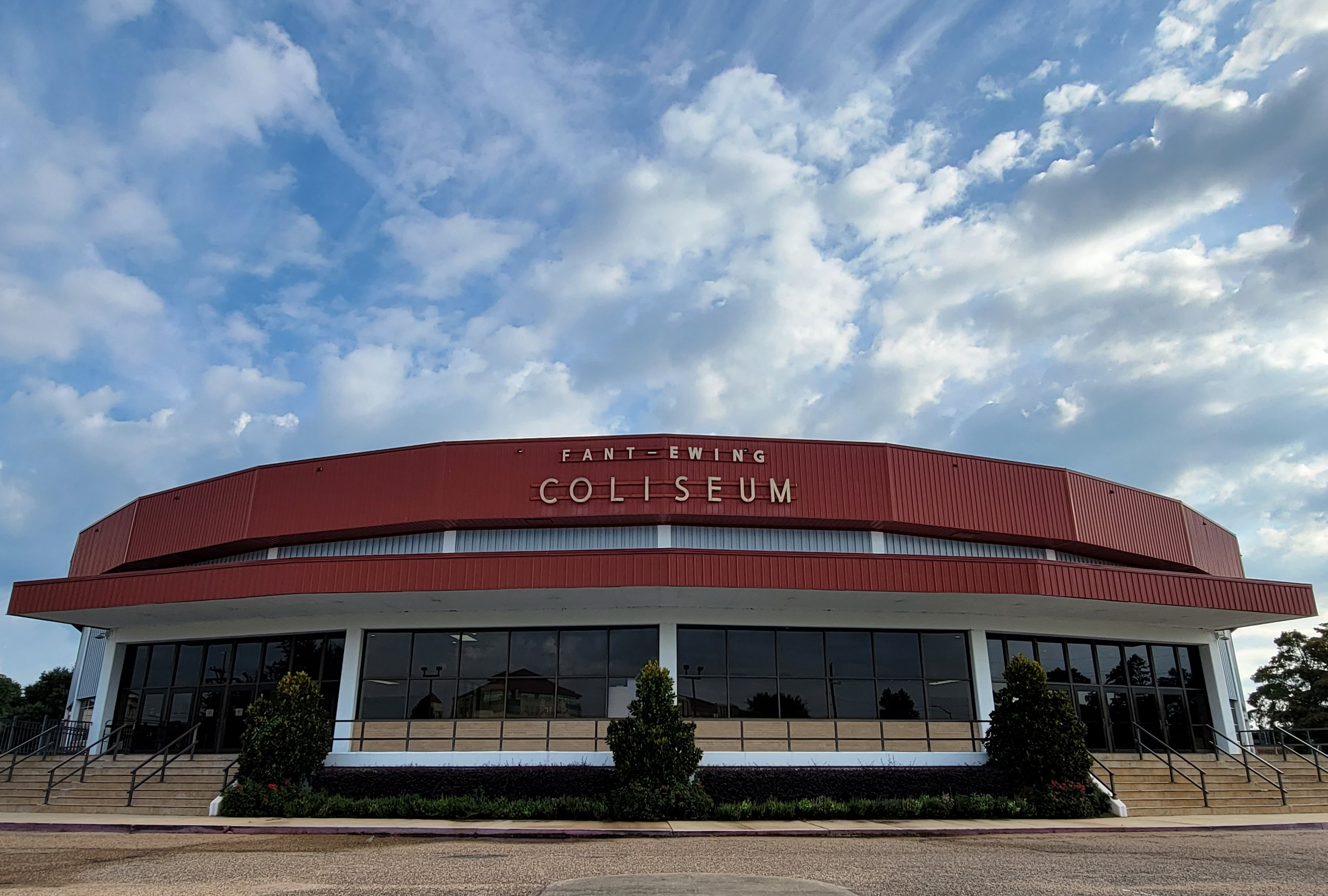
Fant–Ewing Coliseum exterior main entrance

== See also ==
- List of NCAA Division I basketball arenas
- List of music venues
