= Bayou Desiard =

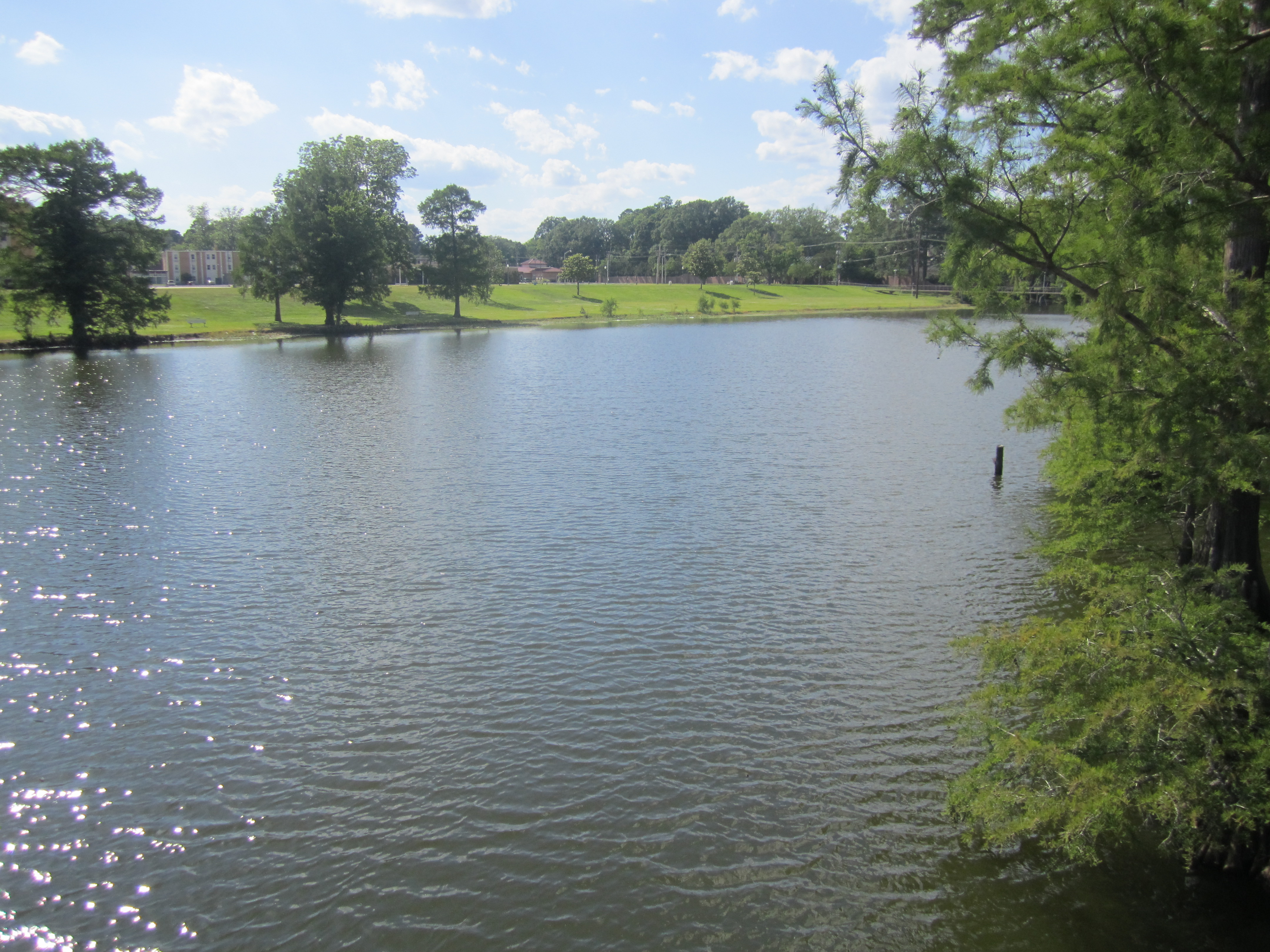
- Bayou Desiard in Monroe, Louisiana

Location
- Country: United States
- Location: Louisiana

Physical characteristics
- Source
  - location: Bartholomew Lake, Black Bayou Lake and Mill Bayou
- Mouth: Ouachita River
  - location: Monroe, Louisiana
  - coordinates: 32°33′14″N 92°07′30″W
- Length: 28 m (92 ft)
- Basin size: 21,349 acres

Basin features
- River system: Arkansas River, Ouachita River

Bayou Desiard is a bayou in Ouachita Parish, Louisiana and Morehouse Parish, Louisiana. The bayou receives inflow from Bayou Bartholomew (Bartholomew Lake), Black Bayou Lake and Mill Bayou and flows through downtown Monroe, Louisiana and the campus of the University of Louisiana at Monroe. The Bayou Desiard Bridge crosses the bayou in Monroe.

== History ==
Originally, Bayou DeSiard formed the lower end of a historical channel of the Arkansas River and received inflow from the Ouachita River. The bayou was impounded by an earthen levee in 1935 thereby diverting the flow to Bartholomew Lake and into Bayou Desiard. By an act of the Louisiana legislature on July 13, 1962, the Bayou DeSiard-Bayou Bartholomew Cut-Off Loop Water Conservation Board was created to build control structures and manage the water levels in the basin.

== Purpose and use ==
Bayou DeSiard is the primary water source for the City of Monroe and is regulated by the city for drinking water and flood control. The bayou is also used for fishing, duck hunting, boating and water skiing. The University of Louisiana at Monroe water ski team and fishing team use the bayou. The annual Bayou DeSiard Dragon Boat Festival is held on the bayou.

== Timber and vegetation ==
Dense stands of bald cypress are located on the northern end of the bayou. Cypress becomes less abundant and more scattered moving north to south. Water Tupelo are also present. Floating vegetation includes duckweed, water hyacinth and eichhornia crassipes. Submerged vegetation includes coontail, fanwort, elodea and southern naiad.
