= Raymond Heard Stadium =

Tennis Stadium

Coordinates: 32.532930°N 92.068249°W

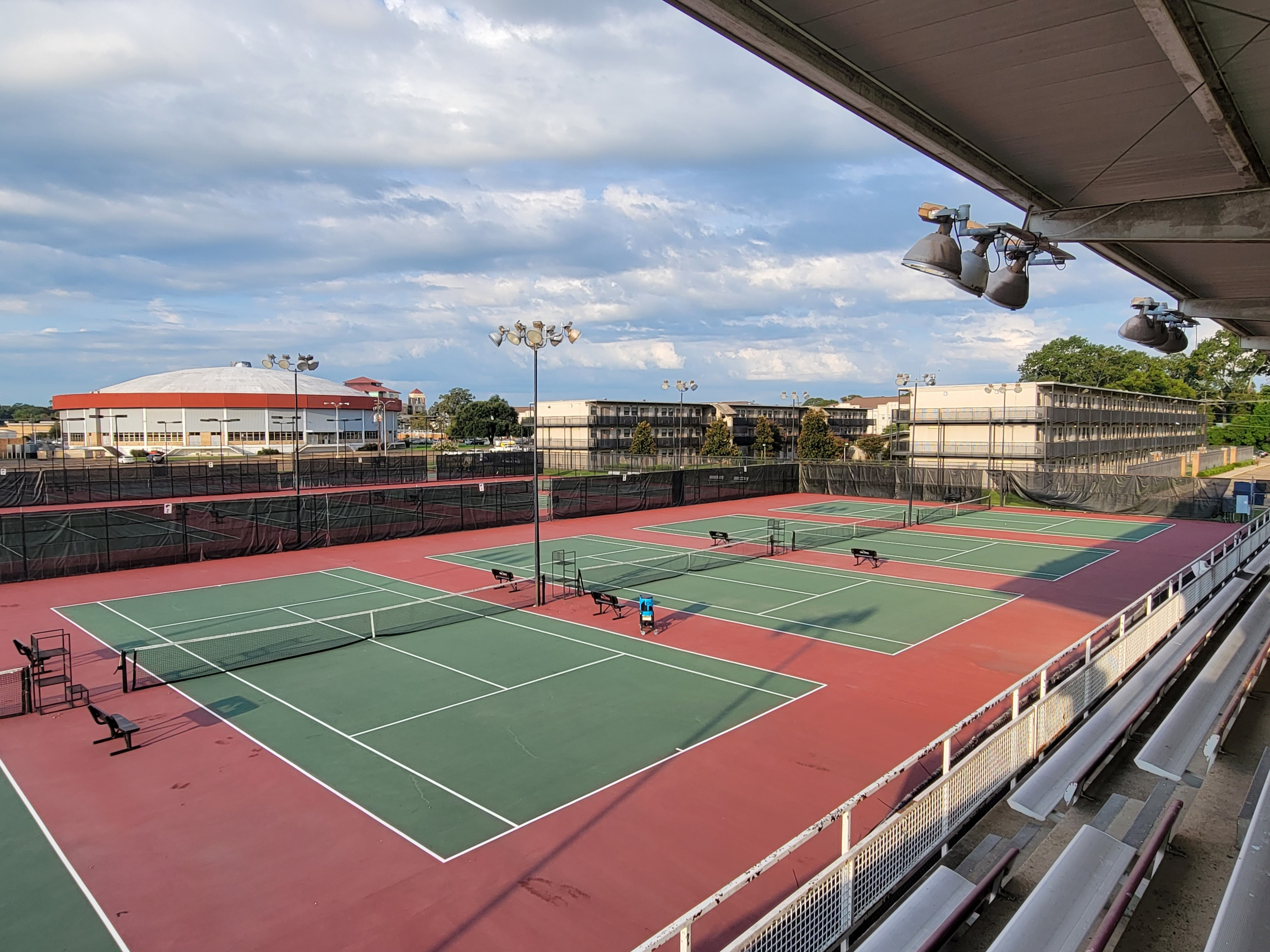
- Raymond Heard Stadium courts
- Interactive map of Raymond Heard Stadium
- Location: Monroe, Louisiana 71201; United States
- Owner: University of Louisiana at Monroe
- Operator: University of Louisiana at Monroe
- Capacity: 515

Construction
- Opened: 1976

Tenant
- Louisiana–Monroe Warhawks (Tennis) (NCAA)

The Raymond Heard Stadium is a tennis stadium in Monroe, Louisiana. It was constructed in 1976 and has been home to the ULM tennis team for over 30 years and opened its gates to a pair of fall tournaments in 2008 for the first time in over 15 years.

The stadium's courts have been home to nine women's conference championship teams and a pair of All-Americans.

In addition to serving as home for Warhawk champions, the stadium has hosted multiple conference championships. Beginning with the Trans America Athletic Conference Championship (now Atlantic Sun Conference) in 1980, the courts have hosted seven league championship events. ULM has hosted two Atlantic Sun Championships (1980 - 1981) and four Southland Conference Championships (1982 - 1994 - 1996 - 1998) at Heard Stadium.

Most recently, ULM tennis became the first Warhawk program to host a Sun Belt Conference Championship after welcoming the league's men's and women's teams for the 2008 Championships. The championship event marked the first on-campus league championship tournament hosted by the Warhawks since joining the league as full members prior to Heard Stadium has also played host to a trio of National Invitational Tournaments (1982 - 1983 - 1984) and has been the host site of several United States Tennis Association tournaments.

The stadium recently underwent a face-lift to prepare it for the Sun Belt Conference Championship and now features 15 fully illuminated courts and elevated grandstand seating. The courts were resurfaced for the 2003 regular season and again prior to the 2008 campaign.

== Gallery ==
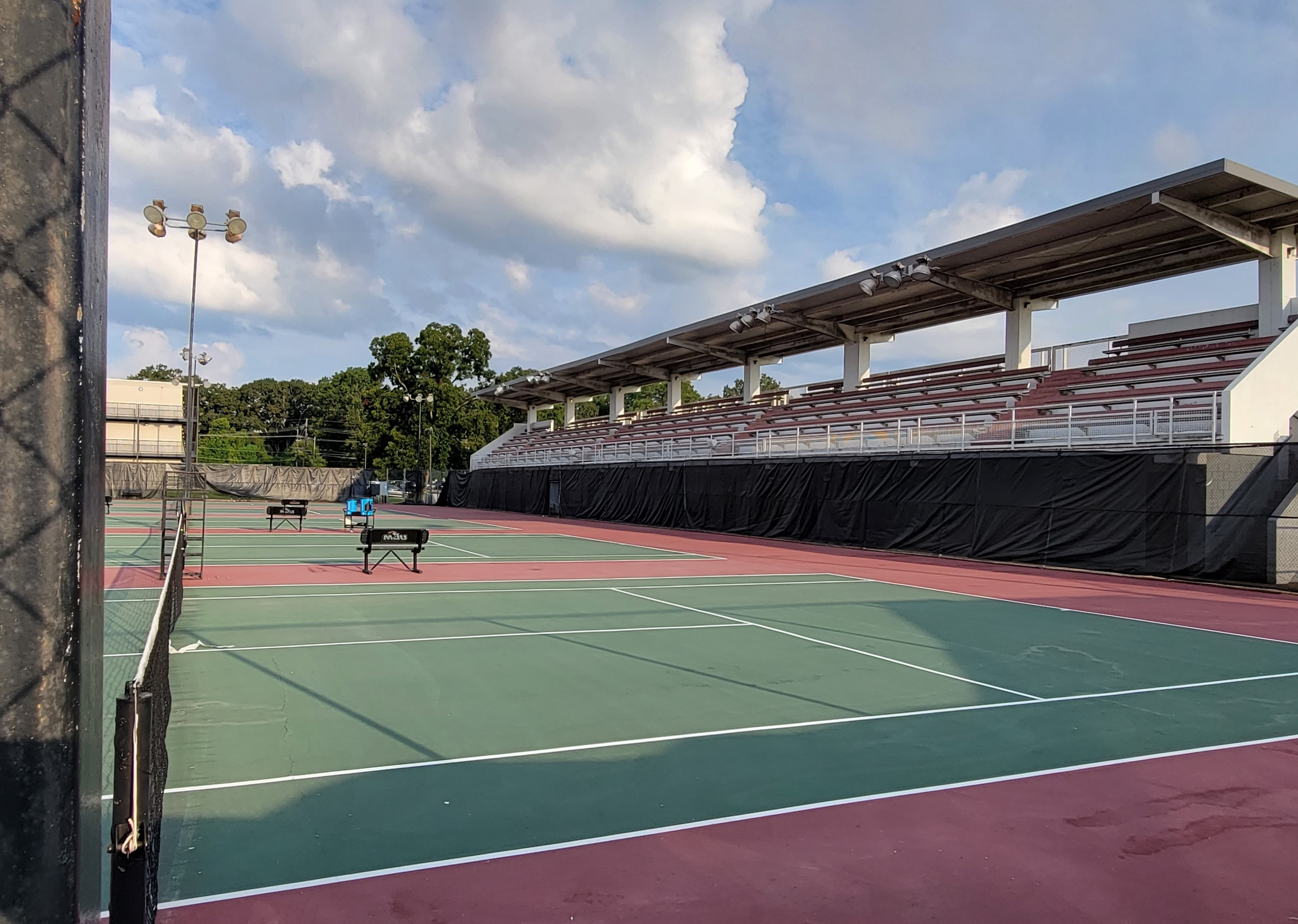
Raymond Heard Stadium courts and stands

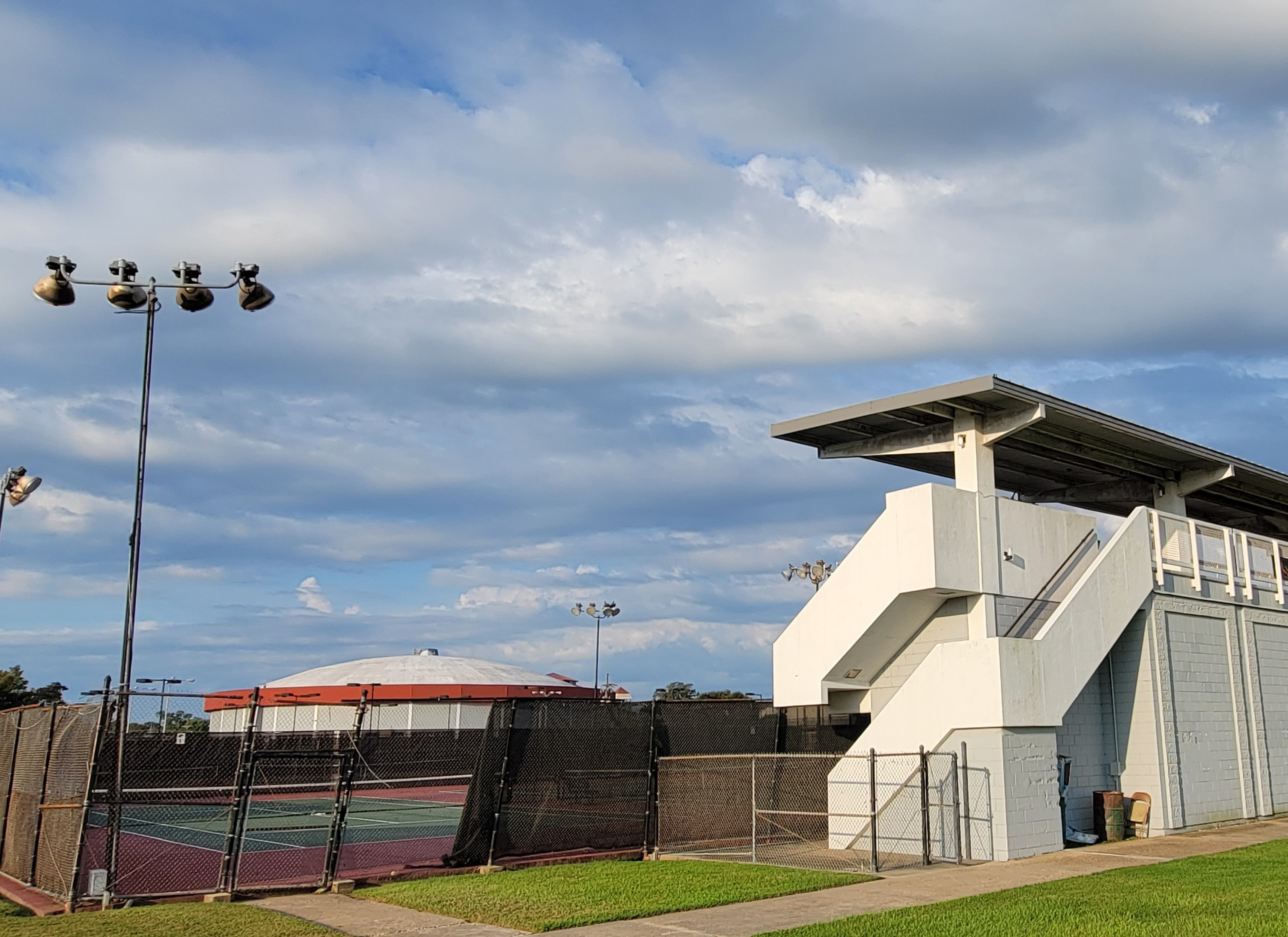
Raymond Heard Stadium exterior

== See also ==
- Louisiana–Monroe Warhawks
