= KLIP =

- Monroe, Louisiana; United States
- Broadcast area: Monroe-West Monroe
- Frequency: 105.3 MHz (HD Radio)
- Branding: LA 105 FM

Programming
- Language: English
- Format: Classic hits

Ownership
- Owner: The Radio People; (Holladay Broadcasting of Louisiana, LLC)
- Sister stations: KJLO-FM, KMLB, KMVX, KRJO, KRVV

History
- First air date: 1993; 33 years ago

Technical information
- Licensing authority: FCC
- Facility ID: 10865
- Class: C2
- ERP: 50,000 watts
- HAAT: 132 meters (433 ft)
- Transmitter coordinates: 32°33′8″N 92°8′33″W

Links
- Public license information: Public file; LMS
- Webcast: Listen live Listen Live (iHeart)
- Website: la105.com

KLIP (105.3 FM, "LA 105 FM") is an American radio station broadcasting a classic hits music format. Licensed to Monroe, Louisiana, United States, the station serves the Monroe area. The station is currently owned by Holladay Broadcasting of Louisiana, LLC. Studios are located in Monroe, and its transmitter is located in nearby West Monroe, Louisiana.

The station is also a member of the Tom Kent Radio Network, and has a broadcast schedule from 6 pm until 6 am local time on weekdays (may be preempted by sports) with Tom Kent from 6 pm until midnight, Jackie Newton from midnight until 3 am, and Steve Kent from 3 am until 6 am. Also part of the schedule is an area from 9 am until noon on Sundays as part of the Powerline radio show.
