= KRVV =

- Bastrop, Louisiana; United States
- Broadcast area: Monroe-West Monroe
- Frequency: 100.1 MHz
- Branding: 100.1 The Beat

Programming
- Language: English
- Format: Urban contemporary
- Affiliations: Premiere Networks; Westwood One

Ownership
- Owner: The Radio People; (Holladay Broadcasting Of Louisiana, LLC)
- Sister stations: KJLO-FM, KLIP, KMLB, KMVX, KRJO

History
- First air date: 1967; 59 years ago
- Former call signs: KJBS (1979–1987); KMYQ-FM (1987–1991)

Technical information
- Licensing authority: FCC
- Facility ID: 27468
- Class: C2
- ERP: 50,000 watts
- HAAT: 150 meters (490 ft)
- Transmitter coordinates: 32°40′20″N 91°55′06″W

Links
- Public license information: Public file; LMS
- Webcast: Listen Live
- Website: thebeat.net

KRVV (100.1 FM, "100.1 The Beat") is an American radio station licensed to Bastrop, Louisiana, and serving the Monroe, Louisiana region. The station is owned by The Radio People and the broadcast license is held by Holladay Broadcasting Of Louisiana, LLC. Studios are located in Monroe, and its transmitter is located south of Bastrop.

== Programming ==
KRVV broadcasts an urban/hip-hop music format to the Monroe, Louisiana, area. KRVV air personalities include The Steve Harvey Morning Show, Grave Digga, DJ Make-A-Move, and The Breakfast Club.

== History ==
At one time KRVV used to be a Public Broadcasting Radio Station back in 1967 until 1991 when new owners Holladay Broadcasting changed the station's branding and format to "The River", a mostly classic rock format that evolved into current mainstream rock, until again changing to "100.1 The Beat" broadcasting an urban contemporary format. The station has been airing its current format since 1993.
