= Ace the Warhawk =

Mascot for the Louisiana–Monroe Warhawks

- Ace the Warhawk
- University: University of Louisiana at Monroe
- Conference: Sun Belt
- Description: Anthropomorphic hawk
- First seen: 2006
- Related mascot(s): Willie Warhawk

Ace the Warhawk is the mascot for the Louisiana–Monroe Warhawks, the athletic teams of the University of Louisiana at Monroe in Monroe, Louisiana, USA. Ace is an anthropomorphic hawk who performs at all ULM athletic events.

== History ==
Prior to 2006, the University's athletic teams were nicknamed the "Indians", and their mascot was Chief Brave Spirit; an anthropomorphic Native American caricature who performed live at all University athletic events.

In 2005, as part of the ongoing NCAA controversy over the use of Native American names and symbols, Louisiana–Monroe was one of 19 colleges and universities throughout the United States who were cited by the NCAA for having "hostile or abusive" team names, mascots, or images. The 19 schools were told that unless they changed their nicknames or got permission from local tribal leaders to use the name, they would be banned from participating in NCAA postseason tournaments. In an attempt to placate the NCAA, the University retired Chief Brave Spirit, and replaced him with a live Native American, dressed in period-appropriate clothing and riding on horseback, in a manner similar to Florida State mascots Osceola and Renegade. However, the NCAA refused to remove Louisiana–Monroe from its list of abusive team nicknames, and on January 30, 2006, the University announced that they would be renaming the school athletic teams, and removing all Native American symbolism and imagery from the campus.

Through online voting, the public was asked to suggest and choose a new nickname for the team. A list of twelve semi-finalists was produced that included "Aviators," "Bayou Bruins," "Bayou Gators," "Bayou Raiders," "Marauders," " Thunderbirds," "Bayou Bandits," "Bayou Buccaneers," "Bayou Hawks," "Bayou Storm," "Thunder," and "Warhawks." From this, the list was whittled down to three finalists, "Bayou Gators," "Bayou Hawks," and "Warhawks," before a selection committee chose "Warhawks," as the new team nickname. The name was chosen in honor of Maj. Gen. Claire Chennault, a Waterproof, Louisiana resident. Chennault commanded the American Volunteer Group of pilots during World War II, whose Curtiss P-40 fighter planes were dubbed "Warhawks."

On August 30, 2006, the school officially introduced Ace the Warhawk as the new team mascot. In honor of Chennault and Louisiana's contribution to aviation, Ace is always seen wearing a black bomber jacket and flight goggles.
