= Louisiana–Monroe Warhawks women's volleyball =

American college volleyball team

ULM Warhawks women's volleyball
- University: University of Louisiana at Monroe
- Head coach: Charlie Olson (2nd season)
- Conference: Sun Belt
- Location: Monroe, Louisiana, US
- Home arena: Fant–Ewing Coliseum (capacity: 7,000)
- Nickname: Warhawks
- Colors: Maroon and gold

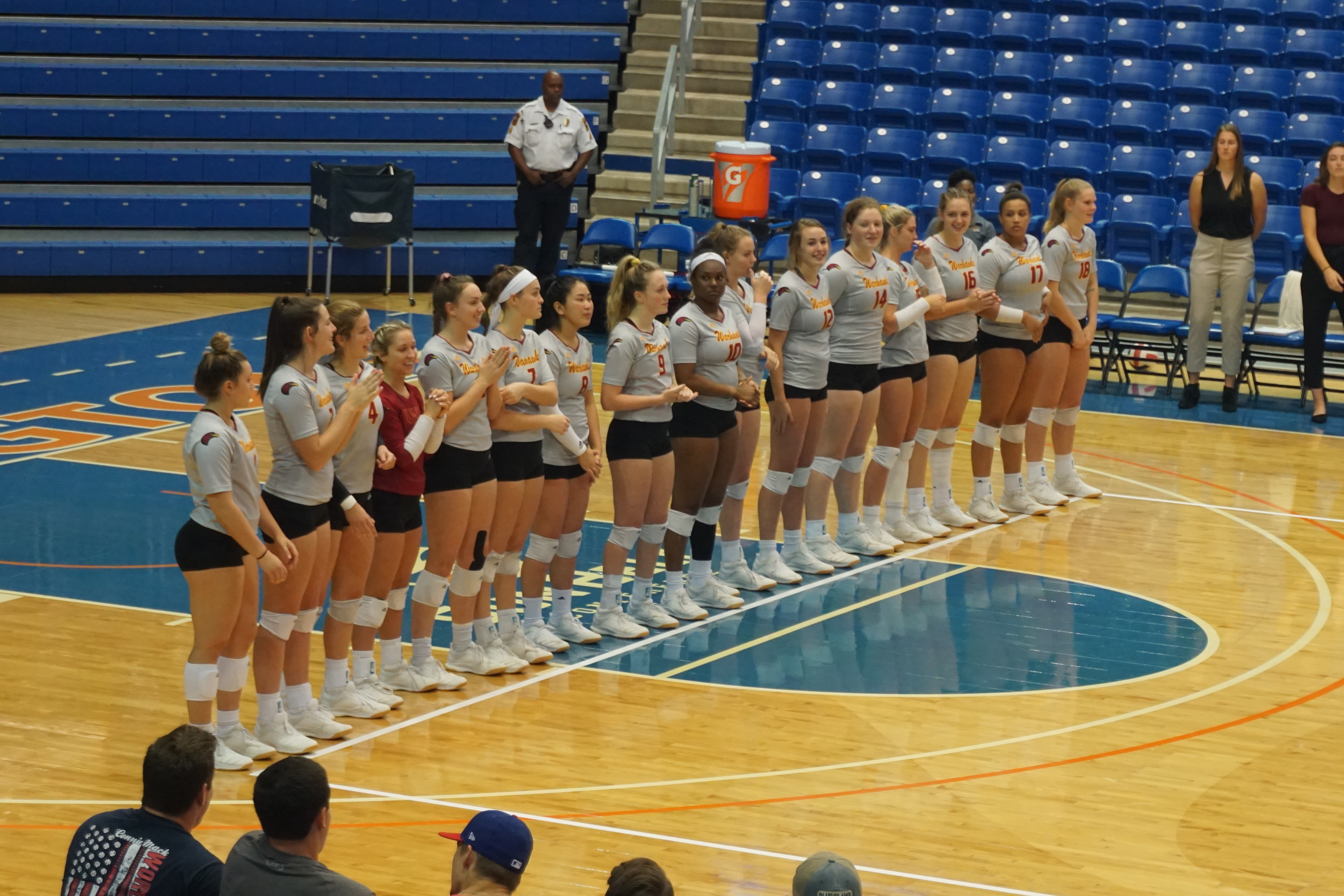
Louisiana–Monroe at UT Arlington

The ULM Warhawks women's volleyball team represents the University of Louisiana at Monroe in the sport of volleyball. The Warhawks compete in NCAA Division I and the Sun Belt Conference. The Warhawks play their home matches in Fant–Ewing Coliseum on the university's Monroe, Louisiana campus, and are currently led by head coach Charlie Olson.

== Year-by-year results ==
Year	Head coach	Overall Record	Conference Record	Standing	Division	Postseason
Northeast Louisiana Indians (Southland Conference) (1982–1998)
1982	Cherrie Walker	0–13	0–4	T-6th		
1983	Mary Jo Murray	7–16	0–4	T-6th		
1984	Rosemary Holloway-Hill	24–17	4–3	4th		
1985	Rosemary Holloway-Hill	30–25	4–2	3rd		
1986	Rosemary Holloway-Hill	16–17	2–4	4th		
1987	Rosemary Holloway-Hill	18–16	3–4	3rd		
1988	Rosemary Holloway-Hill	17–13	3–4	5th		
1989	Rosemary Holloway-Hill	16–10	4–3	4th		
1990	Rosemary Holloway-Hill	16–17	3–4	5th		
1991	Rosemary Holloway-Hill	9–23	2–17	T-7th		
1992	Rosemary Holloway-Hill	6–24	0–9	10th		
1993	Rosemary Holloway-Hill	7–27	2–7	8th		
1994	Phillip Pearcy	5–29	2–11	9th		
1995	Phillip Pearcy	8–26	3–15	7th		
1996	Leanne Zeek	8–24	2–14	8th		
1997	Leanne Zeek	3–30	2–16	9th		
1998	Leanne Zeek	8–23	6–14	T-7th	West	
Louisiana-Monroe Indians (Southland Conference) (1998–2006)
1999	Leanne Zeek	1–30	0–20	11th		
2000	Alycia Varytimidis	2–29	0–20	11th		
2001	Alycia Varytimidis	1–28	0–20	11th		
2002	Alycia Varytimidis	5–26	2–18	11th		
2003	Alycia Varytimidis	7–27	1–19	11th		
2004	Alycia Varytimidis	6–25	0–19	11th		
2005	Mark Pryor	15–16	8–10	7th		
Louisiana-Monroe Warhawks (Sun Belt Conference) (2006–present)
2006	John Schmitt	5–29	2–16	13th		
2007	John Schmitt	1–31	0–18	13th		
2008	John Schmitt	1–31	0–18	13th		
2009	John Schmitt	3–30	0–18	13th		
2010	Ernest Vasquez	0–25	0–16	13th		
2011	Ernest Vasquez	10–16	4–12	11th		
2012	Ernest Vasquez	5–18	1–13	11th		
2013	Patrick Hiltz	6–28	2–18	10th		
2014	Patrick Hiltz	9–24	3–17	10th		
2015	Patrick Hiltz	14–18	3–13	10th		
2016	Patrick Hiltz	9–25	3–13	6th	West	
2017	Patrick Hiltz	5–28	1–15	6th	West	
2018	Russ Friedland	11–19	3–13	6th	West	
2019	Charlie Olson	12–20	2–14	6th	West	
2020	Charlie Olson	1–22	0–16	6th	West	
Total		327–895	77–491			

== See also ==
- List of NCAA Division I women's volleyball programs
