= KJLO-FM =

- Monroe, Louisiana; United States
- Broadcast area: Monroe-West Monroe
- Frequency: 104.1 MHz
- Branding: K-104

Programming
- Language: English
- Format: Country
- Affiliations: Premiere Networks; Westwood One; Louisiana-Monroe football

Ownership
- Owner: The Radio People; (Holladay Broadcasting Of Louisiana, LLC)
- Sister stations: KLIP; KMLB; KMVX; KRJO; KRVV

History
- First air date: 1950
- Former call signs: KMFM (1950–1952); KMLB-FM (1952–1977); KWEZ (1977–1986); KJLO (1986–1989)

Technical information
- Licensing authority: FCC
- Facility ID: 48632
- Class: C0
- ERP: 100,000 watts
- HAAT: 310 meters (1,020 ft)
- Transmitter coordinates: 32°39′39.16″N 92°5′13.17″W

Links
- Public license information: Public file; LMS
- Webcast: Listen live
- Website: k-104.com

KJLO-FM (104.1 MHz) is an American radio station licensed in Monroe, Louisiana, United States. The station is owned by The Radio People and the broadcast license is held by Holladay Broadcasting Of Louisiana, LLC. Studios are located in Monroe, and its transmitter is located near Sterlington, Louisiana.

== Coverage ==
K-104 is a 100,000 watt radio station (97,000 watts effective radiated power) providing local country music, news, and weather coverage to the Louisiana area including Monroe, West Monroe, Bastrop, Jonesboro, Ruston, and Winnsboro. Local Arkansas coverage includes Crossett. The intermediate (distant) coverage in the Louisiana area includes Lake Providence and Winnfield with intermediate Arkansas coverage including El Dorado. Distant or fringe coverage extends out to cover the Louisiana areas including Minden. Arkansas coverage extends to Camden, Magnolia, Monticello, and also extends into Greenville and Vicksburg, Mississippi.

== Warhawk Sports Radio Network ==
KJLO broadcasts every Louisiana–Monroe Warhawks football game.
