= KRJO =

- Monroe, Louisiana; United States
- Frequency: 1680 kHz
- Branding: 99.7 The Legend

Programming
- Language: English
- Format: Classic country

Ownership
- Owner: The Radio People; (Holladay Broadcasting of Louisiana, LLC)
- Sister stations: KJLO-FM; KLIP; KMLB; KMVX; KRVV

History
- First air date: March 2001
- Former call signs: KBJE (1998–2000); KRJO (2000–2001); KYEA (2001)

Technical information
- Licensing authority: FCC
- Facility ID: 87167
- Class: B
- Power: 10,000 watts (day); 1,000 watts (night)
- Transmitter coordinates: 32.45635°N 92.01817°W
- Translator: 99.7 K259CU (Monroe)

Links
- Public license information: Public file; LMS
- Webcast: Listen live
- Website: www.997thelegend.com

KRJO (1680 AM, "99.7 The Legend") is an American radio station broadcasting a classic country music format. The station is licensed to Monroe, Louisiana and is owned by Holladay Broadcasting of Louisiana, LLC. Studios are located in Monroe, and its single-tower transmitter site is located east of Monroe. KRJO's programming is simulcast on Monroe translator station K259CU (99.7 FM).

== History ==
KRJO originated as the expanded band "twin" of an existing station on the standard AM band. On March 17, 1997, the Federal Communications Commission (FCC) announced that 88 stations had been given permission to move to newly available "Expanded Band" transmitting frequencies, ranging from 1610 to 1700 kHz. KMLB (1440 AM) in Monroe, Louisiana, was authorized to move to 1680 kHz.

A construction permit for the expanded band station was assigned the call letters KBJE on September 4, 1998. The new station would sign on in March 2001 as KRJO, with a black gospel format. The FCC's initial policy was that both the original station and its expanded band counterpart could operate simultaneously for up to five years, after which owners would have to turn in one of the two licenses, depending on whether they preferred the new assignment or elected to remain on the original frequency. However, this deadline was extended multiple times, and both stations continued to be authorized beyond the initial time limit.

In November 2006, the Noe family reached an agreement to sell KNOE (540 AM) to Clay Holladay's Holladay Broadcasting. At the time, the FCC noted that "The conditional grant... required Holladay to surrender the license for the station that at the time bore call sign KMLB (AM) ('Old KMLB'), Monroe, Louisiana, prior to Holladay consummating its acquisition" of KNOE. Thus, the original KMLB on 1440 AM was taken off the air, with its license surrendered to the FCC on March 4, 2008. Thirteen days later, the call letters on 540 AM were changed from KNOE to KMLB, and programming previously on 1440 AM was consolidated to the transferred KMLB.

=== 99.7 My FM ===
On July 11, 2016, KRJO changed its format from classic country to hot adult contemporary, branded as "99.7 My FM", simulcast on FM translator K259CU (99.7 FM).

=== Return to classic country ===
On April 5, 2020, KRJO reverted its format back to classic country, branded as "99.7 The Legend" after three years with hot adult contemporary.
