= KMVX =

- Monroe, Louisiana; United States
- Broadcast area: Monroe-West Monroe
- Frequency: 101.9 MHz (HD Radio)
- Branding: Mix 101.9

Programming
- Language: English
- Format: Urban adult contemporary
- Affiliations: The Rickey Smiley Morning Show

Ownership
- Owner: The Radio People; (Holladay Broadcasting of Louisiana, LLC)
- Sister stations: KRVV; KJLO-FM; KLIP; KMLB; KRJO

History
- First air date: January 29, 1967
- Former call signs: KNOE-FM (1967–2013)
- Call sign meaning: Similar to "Mix"

Technical information
- Licensing authority: FCC
- Facility ID: 48976
- Class: C
- ERP: 97,000 watts (horizontal); 96,000 watts (vertical)
- HAAT: 462 meters (1,516 ft)
- Transmitter coordinates: 32°11′50″N 92°4′14″W

Links
- Public license information: Public file; LMS
- Webcast: Listen live
- Website: www.mix1019.net

KMVX (101.9 MHz, "Mix 101.9") is an American radio station licensed to Monroe, Louisiana, United States. The station, established in 1967, is owned by The Radio People and the broadcast license is held by Holladay Broadcasting of Louisiana, LLC. Studios are located in Monroe, and its transmitter is located in rural Caldwell Parish, Louisiana.

== Programming ==
KMVX broadcasts an urban adult contemporary music format to Monroe and the greater Alexandria, Louisiana area and Natchez Mississippi. Local weekday on-air personalities include Rickey Smiley, Rob Lloyd, DJ Scott Banks,

== History ==
The station, under the KNOE-FM call sign, was founded in 1966 by former Governor of Louisiana James A. Noe. Noe had earlier started Monroe AM radio station KNOE in 1944 and Monroe TV station KNOE-TV in 1953. In 1966, he also acquired an AM radio station in New Orleans which he renamed WNOE and in 1968 started New Orleans FM radio station WNOE-FM.

On March 21, 1997, KNOE-FM suffered a catastrophic collapse of its broadcast tower. The 1,969-foot (600 m) tower, roughly 545 feet (166 m) taller than Chicago's Sears Tower, collapsed as a result of a maintenance crew's failure to install a temporary support structure during the replacement of diagonal braces. Of the three workers on the tower at the time of the collapse, one was killed, one fell into a satellite dish about 12 feet (3.7 m) above the ground, and one was thrown clear and walked away basically unharmed. The workers were together about 200 feet (61 m) up the tower when it collapsed. The tower, whose primary tenant was KNOE-TV, was also used by Louisiana Public Broadcasting. After operating from temporary facilities for more than a year, KNOE-FM's permanent replacement tower was ready for use in June 1998 and licensed for operation by the Federal Communications Commission (FCC) on September 15, 1998.

James A. Noe's son, James Albert "Jimmie" Noe Jr., ran KNOE-FM along with its AM and TV sister stations for almost four decades. When Jimmie Noe died from cancer in 2005, the remaining family members agreed to place the stations up for sale and exit broadcasting. In October 2007, the Noe family reached an agreement to sell this station to Clay Holladay's Radio Monroe, LLC., for a reported $900,000. The deal was approved by the FCC on May 1, 2008, and the transaction was consummated on May 13, 2008.

On March 3, 2013, KNOE-FM changed its format from Top 40 (CHR) "Star 101.9" to urban adult contemporary, branded as "Mix 101.9". The call letters were changed to KMVX on March 21, 2013.
