= KMLB =

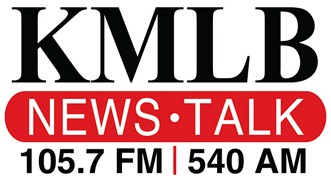
- Monroe, Louisiana; United States
- Broadcast area: Monroe, Louisiana metropolitan area
- Frequency: 540 kHz
- Branding: News Talk 105.7 FM & 540 AM

Programming
- Language: English
- Format: Talk radio
- Affiliations: ABC News Radio; Compass Media Networks; Premiere Networks; Radio America; Westwood One

Ownership
- Owner: The Radio People; (Holladay Broadcasting of Louisiana, LLC)
- Sister stations: KJLO-FM; KLIP; KMVX; KRJO; KRVV

History
- First air date: October 4, 1944
- Former call signs: KNOE (1944–2008)
- Former frequencies: 1230 AM (1944–1948); 1390 AM (1948–1963)
- Call sign meaning: "Monroe Louisiana Broadcasting"

Technical information
- Licensing authority: FCC
- Facility ID: 35249
- Class: D
- Power: 4,000 watts (day); 26 watts (night)
- Transmitter coordinates: 32°32′36″N 92°10′45″W
- Translator: 105.7 K289CG (Houma)

Links
- Public license information: Public file; LMS
- Webcast: Listen live (via iHeartRadio)
- Website: kmlb.com

KMLB (540 AM) is a commercial radio station broadcasting a talk radio format. Licensed to Monroe, Louisiana, the station is owned by Holladay Broadcasting. Studios are located in Monroe.

The station's transmitter site is a single-tower non-directional antenna in nearby West Monroe, Louisiana. KMLB operates with 4,000 watts by day, covering parts of Louisiana, Arkansas and Mississippi. But because AM 540 is a clear-channel frequency reserved for Canada and Mexico, the station must greatly reduce power at night to 26 watts.

KMLB's programming is simulcast on FM translator K289CG at 105.7 MHz.

== Programming ==
Most of KMLB's schedule is made up of nationally syndicated conservative talk shows, including, Moon Griffon, The Clay Travis and Buck Sexton Show, Sean Hannity, Dave Ramsey, The Mark Levin Show, and Coast to Coast AM with George Noory. Weekends feature Kim Komando, Bill Cunningham, Ben Ferguson, Bill Handel and Somewhere in Time with Art Bell. Most hours begin with world and national news from Fox News.

== History ==
The station first signed on, as KNOE, on October 4, 1944, at 1230 kHz. It was founded by former Governor of Louisiana James A. Noe.

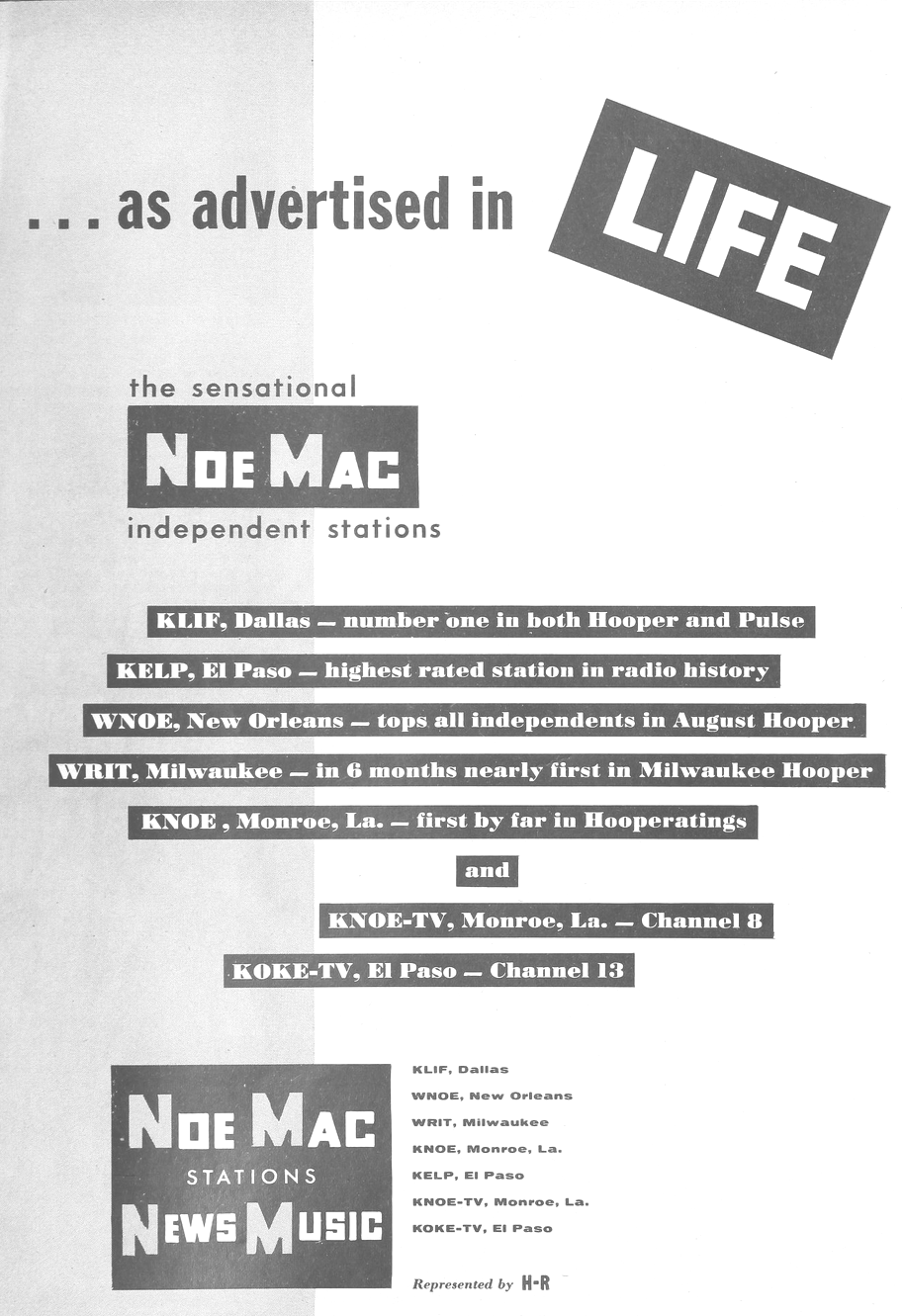
NoeMac stations list (1955)

In November 1948, the Federal Communications Commission (FCC) approved a frequency shift for KNOE from 1230 to 1390 kHz, with a concurrent increase in power from 250 watts to 5,000 watts. At that time, the station was an affiliate of the NBC Radio Network. On September 27, 1953, the station signed on a TV station, KNOE-TV (channel 8). On January 9, 1967, KNOE-FM 101.9 came on the air.

In 1963, KNOE moved to 540 kHz, with a daytime power of 5,000 watts, and a nighttime power of 1,000 watts.

Noe's son, James Albert "Jimmie" Noe Jr., ran KNOE for almost four decades, along with its FM and TV sister stations. When Jimmie Noe died from cancer in 2005, the remaining family members agreed to place the stations up for sale and exit broadcasting.

In November 2006, the Noe family reached an agreement to sell KNOE to Clay Holladay's Holladay Broadcasting. On March 6, 2007, the station announced extensive programming changes, moving Rush Limbaugh to KNOE and adding new programming. According to the news story, KMLB, then at 1440 AM, would be a "general interest talk" station, while KNOE would become a "political talk" station.

At the time of the 2006 station sale to Holladay, the FCC noted that "The conditional grant... required Holladay to surrender the license for the station that at the time bore call sign KMLB (AM) ('Old KMLB'), Monroe, Louisiana, prior to Holladay consummating its acquisition" of KNOE. Thus, the original KMLB on 1440 AM was taken off the air, with its license surrendered to the FCC on March 4, 2008.

Thirteen days later, the call letters on 540 AM were changed from KNOE to KMLB, and programming previously on 1440 AM was consolidated to the transferred KMLB. The station began operating from a new transmitter site, and switched from a directional to a non-directional antenna, resulting on a daytime power reduction from 5,000 to 4,000 watts, while the nighttime power was decreased from 1,000 to 26 watts, with a corresponding reclassification of KMLB as a "Class D" facility.

== Alumni ==
- Rob Redding
