= The Radio People =

Radio broadcasting company in the southern United States

The Radio People is an American broadcasting company, which owns and operates radio stations in Louisiana, Alabama, Florida and Mississippi. It was established in 2008 and is based in Monroe, Louisiana.

== Radio Stations ==
- WUSJ - 96.3 - Country - Jackson, MS
- WJKK - 98.7 - Adult contemporary - Jackson, MS
- KRVV - 100.1 - Hip-hop - Monroe, LA
- WYOY - 101.7 - Top-40 - Jackson, MS
- KMVX - 101.9 - Urban AC - Monroe, LA
- KJLO - 104.1 - Country - Monroe, LA
- KLIP - 105.3 - Classic Hits - Monroe, LA
- KMLB - 540 - Talk - Monroe, LA
- WMOG - 910 - Urban gospel - Meridian, MS
- KRJO - 1680 - Classic country - Monroe, LA
