= Radio in Argentina =

Radio in Argentina is an important facet of the nation's media and culture. Radio, which was first broadcast in Argentina in 1920, has been widely enjoyed in Argentina since the 1930s. Radio broadcast stations totaled around 150 active AM stations, 1,150 FM stations, and 6 registered shortwave transmitters. An estimated 24 million receivers were in use in 2000 (2.4 per household).

== History ==
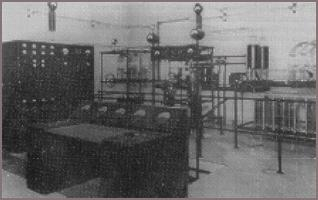
Installations at LR5 Radio Splendid in Monte Grande in 1933.

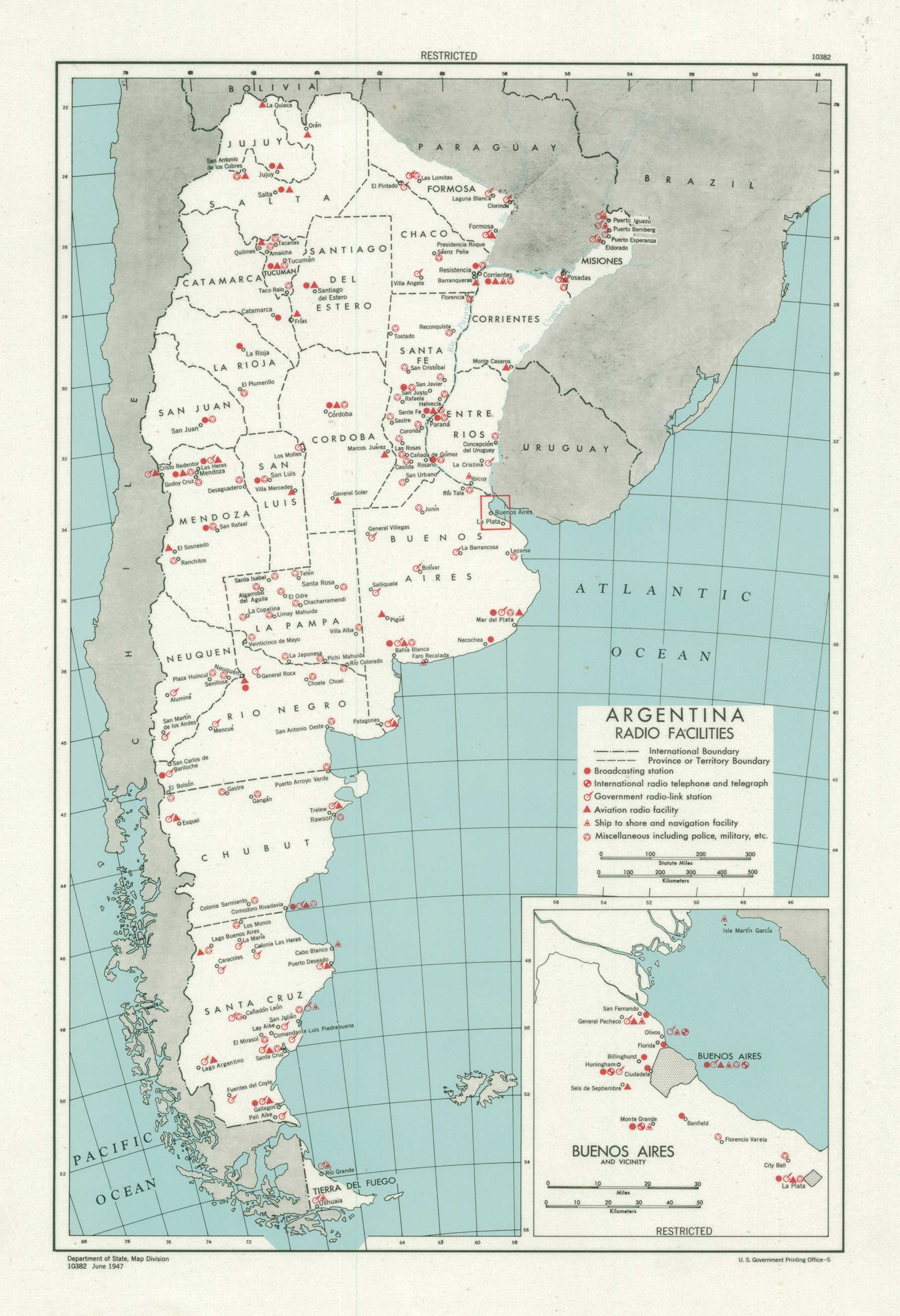
CIA map of radio facilities, 1947

Radio broadcasting enjoys a long and varied history in Argentina, tracing its origins to a 1910 stay in the southside Buenos Aires suburb of Bernal by Guglielmo Marconi, inventor of the wireless telegraph. There, he achieved a rudimentary radio transmission with a kite-mounted antenna connected to earphones. Argentine publisher José C. Paz later sponsored Marconi's radio transmission from Italy to Buenos Aires, the first transatlantic broadcast into South America.

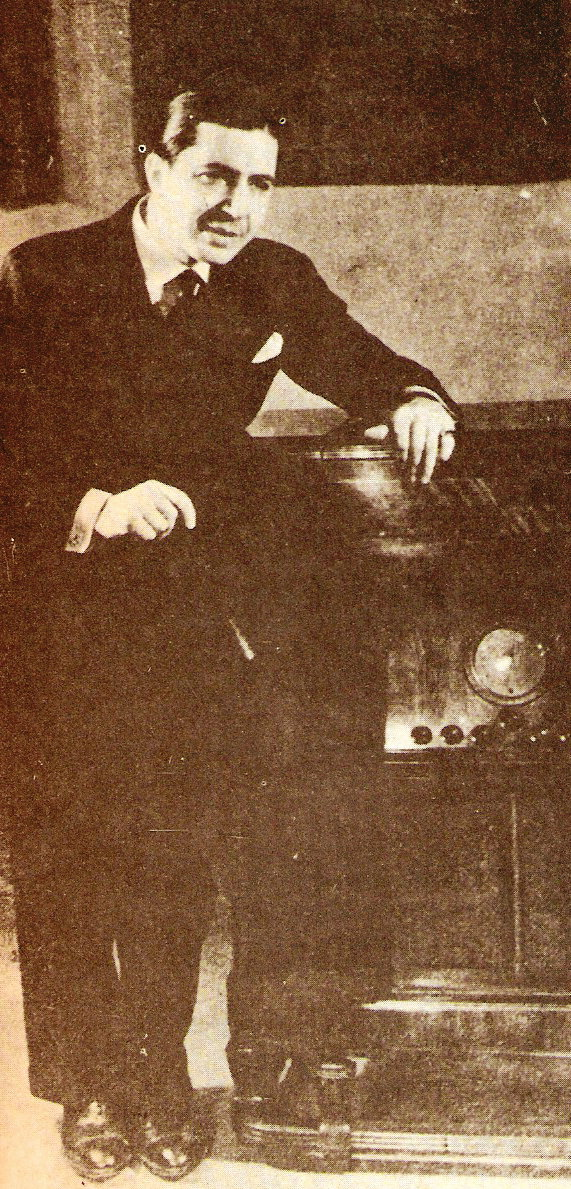
Legendary tango vocalist Carlos Gardel tunes in around 1930.

Three local medical students, led by Enrique Susini, began their own radio experiments in 1917 and, installing transmission equipment in Buenos Aires' Coliseo Theatre, they broadcast, on August 27, 1920, Parsifal, the first opera on radio and only the second radio broadcast in the World. These installations became LOR Radio Argentina, the World's first formal radio station. The number of receivers in the city at the time: around 20. This station was joined in 1922 by LOX, whose ad for the Los Andes Restaurant is probably the World's first on radio. Several more stations opened in Buenos Aires during Argentina's prosperous 1920s and growing numbers of artists signed contracts for live performances on the growing variety of radio dramas.

Leading stations at the time began broadcasting from the numerous, ornate theatre stages in Buenos Aires, including LR5 Radio Splendid (so named for the venue where its shows were produced, the Grand Splendid Theatre). Among the notable events broadcast live at the time was President Marcelo Torcuato de Alvear's inaugural, in 1922, and the 1923 "bout of the century" in Polo Grounds, New York City, between Jack Dempsey and Luis Ángel Firpo for the World Heavyweight title.

The medium's boom and the lucrative local ad market allowed Susini to sell his station in 1930 to U.S. telecom giant ITT for US$200 million, a record at the time. The visionary entrepreneur invested a part of the funds into Lumiton Studios, among the first to produce sound movies in the world.

Argentine radio embraced tango in the early 1930s, airing the work of orchestras such as Francisco Canaro's and Julio de Caro's; LR1-Mundo (referred to as LR1 for its being the first on the dial) became the standard for tango broadcasts. The decade saw the rise of Jaime Yankelevich, a former radio valve distributor, as the dominant force in the medium, thorough Radio El Mundo (inaugurated in 1935), and Radio Belgrano, which became the first in Argentina to broadcast through a chain of repeater stations, and the first to expand into late-night broadcasting. Buenos Aires was by then home to 25 stations (as many as in New York, a city, at the time, almost three times larger). The state entered the radio market in 1937, with the inaugural of LRA Radio Nacional Radio Mitre became the first in Argentina to broadcast around the clock, in 1960.

Luis Sandrini's Felipe and other comedy shows became ratings leaders during the 1940s, and as most Argentines were still either immigrants or first and second generation Argentines, many revolved around the use of thickly accented ethnic humor. Some of the most popular were Niní Marshall's characters, particularly Catita and Cándida (1939 film). The trend was not without its detractors, however, and in 1943, the newly installed dictatorship of General Pedro Ramírez banned humor which "deformed the language," leading to exile for Marshall and numerous other radio stars.

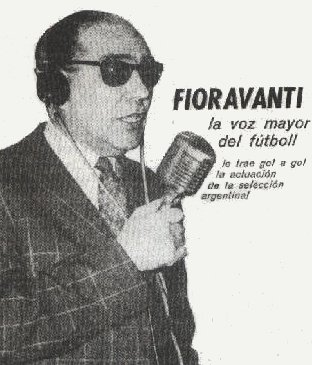
Football announcer Fioravanti, who helped maintain radio's dominance in sports broadcasting after the advent of television.

Programming focused on Argentine folk music and Peronist propaganda during the populist administration of President Juan Perón, who met his influential wife, Evita, when the latter was a radio matinée star; among Perón's most compelling voices in support on the radio was Tango composer Enrique Santos Discépolo, who also hosted political commentary shows. The public sector became increasingly involved in Argentine radio during Perón's 1946–55 presidency, and afterwards. All broadcast chains were nationalized, and state radio extended overseas in 1958 with the inaugural of the Argentine Foreign Broadcasting Service. The station became only the third in the Western Hemisphere (after the Voice of America and Radio Canada International) to broadcast internationally and in several languages.

Television in Argentina, which had been developed by Jaime Yankelevich in 1951 under state licence, eroded radio's listener base during the 1950s and '60s. A number of radio hosts, however, such as musician Jorge Raúl Batallé, talent show host Roberto Galán, and news and commentary hosts, such as Antonio Carrizo, Cacho Fontana, and Héctor Larrea (whose Rapidísmo, from 1967, became influential to the Argentine morning show format) rivaled their television counterparts.

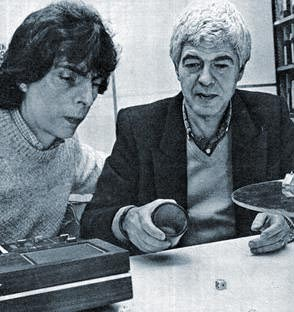
Alejandro Dolina and Adolfo Castelo were among those who helped shape Argentine radio after the lifting of censorship in the 1980s

Censorship also intensified, however, and a number of commentators had shows cancelled, notably Hugo Guerrero Marthineitz, who hosted the intellectual interview program, El show del minuto. The Comité Federal de Radiodifusión (COMFER) was established in 1972 to both regulate the growing number of unlicensed stations, as well as to increase state influence over the medium. The return of Juan Perón from exile led to a second round of nationalizations in 1974, including all major television stations. The Radio Broadcasting Law of 1980, which led to the privatization of 44 stations, touched off an era of state disinvolvement in Argentine radio, however, and helped lead to corporate consolidation over the airwaves. Many of these hitherto public radio stations (known by their acronym, LRA) had helped extend the medium into Argentina's then-remote far north and Patagonia. Argentine radio, was long dominated by AM broadcasting (only 22 FM stations were in service), and AM remained popular on the airwaves, even as FM stations grew to outnumber these in subsequent decades.

The return of democracy in 1983 led to an unprecedented selection of news programs, and many became known for muck-raking exposés; some of the highest-rated included Magdalena Ruiz Guiñazú, Santo Biasatti, and Nelson Castro. A number of new stations dedicated to Rock music and other forms of pop culture also opened, notably Rock & Pop (1985), led by Daniel Grinbank; the station became well known in the late 1980s for its irreverent Radio Bangkok program, hosted by Lalo Mir. Easy listening host Nora Perlé (Canciones son amores), Jazzología host Carlos Inzillo, Variety show host Chiche Gelblung (Edición Chiche), and critic and raconteur Alejandro Dolina (La venganza sera terrible), also became prominent in radio broadcasting at this time.

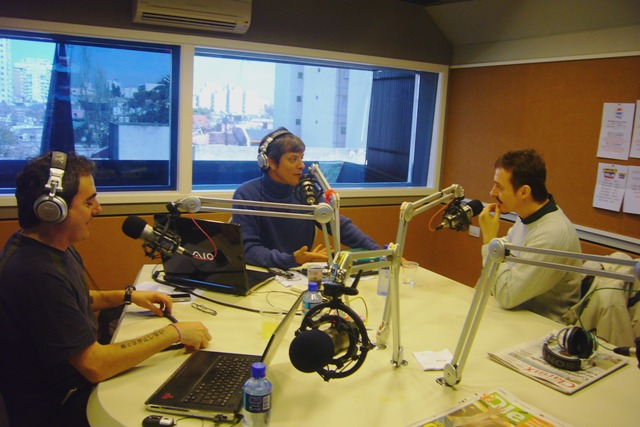
Mario Pergolini (middle) hosts Cuál es?

Football remained a perennial favorite on the Argentine radio, and some of the best-known announcers have included Fioravanti, José María Muñoz, Enrique Macaya Márquez, Horacio Pagani, Marcelo Araujo, and Víctor Hugo Morales, among many others.

ArInfo (Buenos Aires) became the first Argentine station to broadcast online in 2001 and by 2009, 61 stations did so, nationwide. The ownership structure of both radio and television broadcasting became increasingly concentrated after the 1980 Media Law, however, and many of the most popular radio stations are owned by conglomerates, including Radio Continental (Telefe), Radio Mitre (Grupo Clarín), Radio Rivadavia (Grupo Uno), and Radio 10 (Daniel Hadad). The contentious Audiovisual Communication Services Law, signed by President Cristina Kirchner in 2009 and upheld by the Argentine Supreme Court in 2013, would restrict the number of media licences per proprietor and limit the influence of the principal media conglomerates by allocating a greater share of these to the state and NGOs.

== Stations ==
Today, in Argentina, there are now more than 150 AM stations, 1150 FM stations and 6 shortwave radio stations broadcasting throughout the country.

The following stations are licensed to Greater Buenos Aires area (or GBA):

AM

- 570 - LR 2 Argentina
- 590 - LS 4 Continental
- 630 - LS 5 Rivadavia
- 710 - LRL 200 710
- 750 - LRL 203 750
- 790 - LR 6 Mitre
- 870 - LRA Radio Nacional
- 910 - LR 5 La Red
- 950 - LR 3 CNN (formerly Belgrano, and now under licensed by the news channel of the same name)
- 990 - LR 4 Splendid
- 1030 - LS 10 Del Plata
