= Cacho Fontana =

Argentine broadcaster (1932–2022)

Jorge Fontana
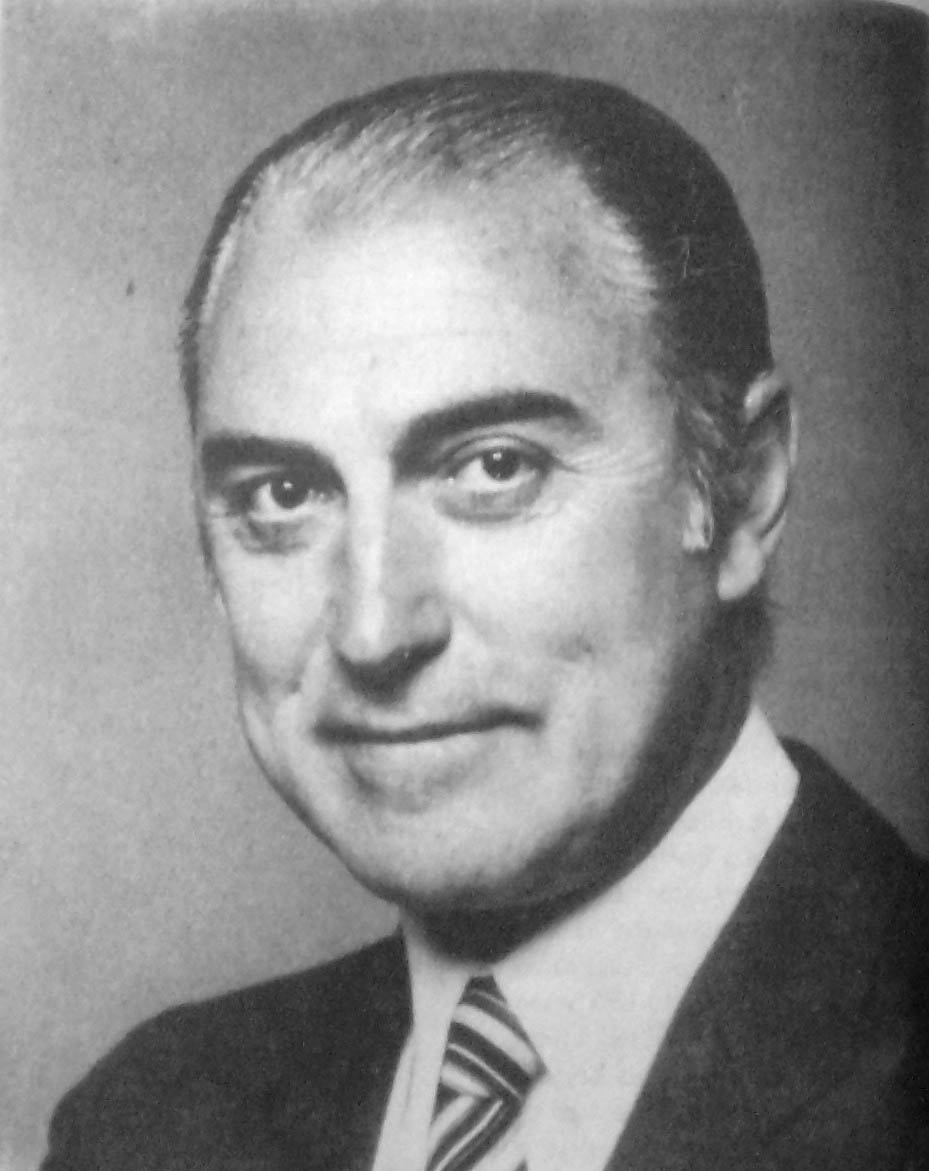
- Born: Norberto Palese Filgueiras; 23 April 1932; Buenos Aires, Argentina
- Died: 5 July 2022 (aged 90); Buenos Aires, Argentina
- Other name: Cacho
- Occupations: Announcer, presenter
- Awards: Konex Award

Jorge "Cacho" Fontana (born Norberto Palese Filgueiras; 23 April 1932 – 5 July 2022) was an Argentine radio and television personality.

== Life and work ==
Born Norberto Palese in the Barracas section of Buenos Aires, he was the only child of Nieves Filgueiras and Antonio Palese. He began his career in show business at age sixteen, when Jorge Loguarro, a friend and coworker who moonlighted as a stage presenter, invited him to do likewise at the Salón Argentino on Corrientes Avenue. The company hired Palese as a presenter for their traveling show, and the young man adopted his stage name: Jorge "Cacho" Fontana.

He debuted on the radio in Argentina in 1950 when a chance encounter with radio host Roberto González Rivero ("Riverito") at the Huracán Stadium resulted in his being hired as an announcer on Riverito's Peña de tango, on Radio del Pueblo. He then worked with radio theater host Julio César Barton, and as a sportscaster for Chacarita Juniors. He replaced Carlos Carella, who began a career in film, at the popular El Chantecler revue and became acquainted with Argentine comedy greats Tita Merello and Luis Sandrini as a stand-in for host Jaime Font Saravia in El Relámpago ("The Thunderbolt"), where Merello and Sandrini starred under the direction of Miguel Coronatto Paz. Coronatto Paz later hired Fontana on a permanent basis. His first marriage, to Dora Palma, ended after two years; they had one daughter.

Fontana hosted a morning show, beginning in 1955, with María Esther Vignola and Rina Morán on Radio El Mundo. The "Fontana Show" was a success, and the show attracted prestigious producers such as Alberto Migré, Hugo Moser, Abel Santa Cruz, and Relámpago producer Miguel Coronatto Paz. He premiered on Argentine television in 1956, hosting the quiz show Odol Pregunta on Channel 7, and a talk show, La Campana de Cristal. His producer on Channel 7, Guillermo Brizuela Méndez, would become a friend and mentor to the young star. He appeared in numerous advertising spots in subsequent years, as well as in sportscasting, and would work with leading Argentine football announcer José María Muñoz during the 1966 FIFA World Cup. The Fontana Show on Radio El Mundo ended in 1967. Fontana joined Radio Rivadavia, and he and Muñoz became the station's signature football announcers during eight years. Fontana also covered boxing, and was on hand for Nicolino Locche's 1968 Light Welterweight World Championship win, as well as for Ringo Bonavena's fifteenth-round knockout loss against Muhammad Ali in 1970. He served as chief news correspondent during the 1970 ceremony bestowing the Nobel Prize in Physiology or Medicine to Dr. Luis Federico Leloir. The Fontana Show returned on the airwaves as a four-hour, live current events and interview program. The show became known for its on-site reporting, and its host often interviewed guests in their cars with a mobile unit plugged into the cigarette lighter. The popular program helped launch the careers of Carlos Abrevaya, Adolfo Castelo, and Jorge Guinzburg, among others.

Fontana had a twelve-year relationship with tango vocalist Beba Bidart, and in 1970 married model Liliana Caldini, who was 20 years younger than him and with whom he had twin daughters. He left Radio Rivadavia in December 1973 to pursue an offer from Spanish radio network Cadena SER, where he continued his morning show format. He returned to Argentina in 1977, and joined Channel 13. The new program would feature more international news by incorporating a VCR and imported news footage, hence the name: "VideoShow." The show was a success, and on 17 August 1978, Fontana's VideoShow was given the honor of inaugurating the nation's first color television station, ATC.

The sinking of the ARA General Belgrano on 2 May 1982, at the height of the Falklands War, prompted Fontana to organize a telethon for the benefit of the troops, Las 24 horas de las Malvinas, hosted alongside Lidia Elsa Satragno on 7–8 May. The marathon 24-hour event, which raised US$1.5 million as well as sundries and valuables, would become a serious setback to his career, however. Following the Argentine defeat five weeks later, revelations surfaced that the donations, as well as the Islas Malvinas Patriotic Fund these were deposited into (totaling US$54 million), were largely misappropriated by the Galtieri regime.

His marriage to Liliana Caldini ended acrimoniously after twelve years. Fontana returned to radio in 1983 as co-host of the comedy series Chapucai, with Nito Artaza, on LOR Radio Argentina. He transferred to LRA Radio Nacional the following year to host Fontana Nacional, and earned a contract as spokesperson for local dairy products maker La Serenísima. The Radio Nacional studio was located across the street from Atahualpa Yupanqui's Buenos Aires address, and the noted folk singer-songwriter became a frequent, impromptu co-host. He returned to Radio Rivadavia as host of Sexta Edición (Sixth Edition) in 1986. Co-hosted by Antonio Carrizo, Héctor Larrea, and José María Muñoz, the show restored Fontana's prominence in the medium during the late 1980s.

The contract as spokesman for La Serenísima ended in 1989, and though the Fontana Show returned on Radio Rivadavia in 1992, its cancellation in 1993 marked the effective end of Fontana's storied career. He would appear only sporadically in advertisements or special programs in later years. The avuncular host, winner of 14 Martín Fierro Awards (as well as one for lifetime achievement) and an Ondas Prize from Spain, considered leaving the country where his name had been a household word. Fontana's relationship with Marcela Tiraboschi ended in the early 1990s amid lawsuits, and he later struggled with alcoholism and drug addiction. His mother died in 2006 at age 101, and in 2009 he underwent a coronary artery bypass surgery. He overcame these challenges, however, later appearing in the Cosquín Festival (one of the most important recurring events in Argentine music) and returning as a spokesman for La Serenísima.
