= LRA36 Radio Nacional Arcángel San Gabriel =

LRA36 Nacional Arcángel San Gabriel
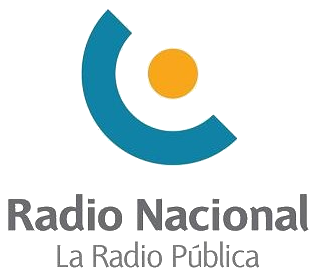

Esperanza Base, Graham Land; Argentina
- Broadcast area: Shortwave: International; FM: Esperanza Base
- Frequency: Shortwave: 15476 kHz; FM: 96.7 MHz

Programming
- Format: Shortwave; FM; Internet
- Affiliations: LRA Radio Nacional

Ownership
- Owner: Radio y Televisión Argentina S.A.
- Operator: Antarctic command of the Argentinian Army
- Sister stations: Radiodifusión Argentina al Exterior

Technical information
- Power: 10 Kw (Shortwave)
- Transmitter coordinates: 63°23′52″S 56°59′55″W

Links
- Webcast: Listen Live
- Website: Radio Nacional

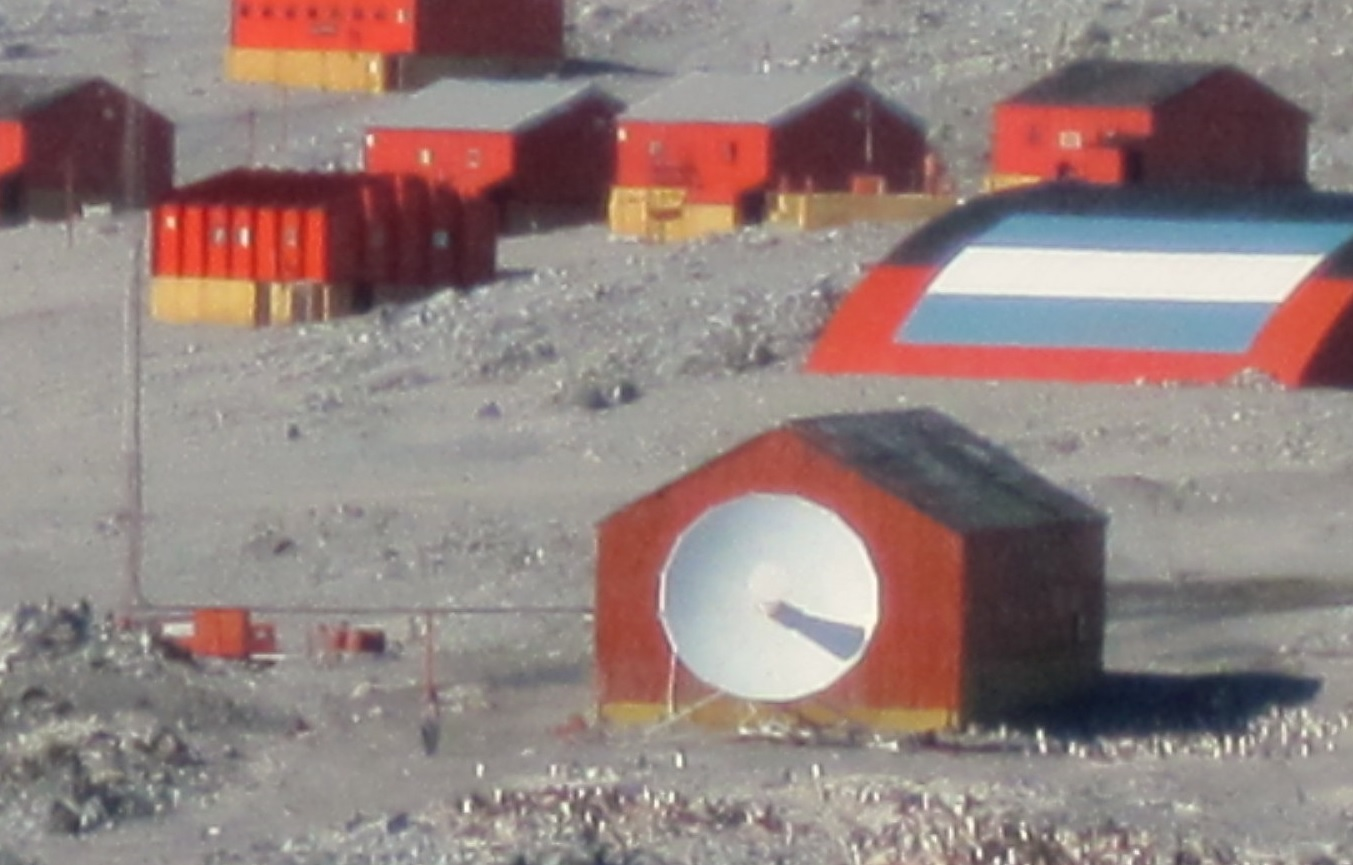
The transmitter building is shown behind the large white antenna

LRA36 Radio Nacional Arcángel San Gabriel (also known as Radio San Gabriel and Radio Arcángel San Gabriel), is an Argentine radio station that transmits on shortwave on 15476 kHz in the 19 meter band and on 96.7 FM, from Esperanza Base, Antarctica. LRA36 is one of the southernmost radio stations in the world. Their interval signal identifies the station in several languages.

== History and characteristics ==
The first broadcasts from the base used a frequency allocated for nautical weather on Christmas Eve in 1978, broadcasting Christmas carols and the Christmas Eve Mass held by the chaplain of Chapel of St. Francis of Assisi at the base. The broadcast was received with a strong signal by other Antarctic bases and across Latin America. After this, plans were sent to the Argentinian Secretary of Communications, the Minister of Foreign Relations, and the Secretary of Public Information, to establish a permanent station.

On August 24, 1979, the icebreaker ARA Almirante Irízar set sail on its maiden voyage with a 1200-watt transmitter, a mixing console, tape recorders, cement columns for transporting transmission lines, towers, antennas, broadcasting equipment, various accessories, and six communications experts to build out the radio station. The icebreaker arrived on September 17, and construction of the studios and installation of the antennas and equipment began the same day. The radio station made its first broadcast on October 20, 1979 at 11:20 AM local time with the message:

Here LRA36 Radio Nacional Arcángel San Gabriel is transmitting from Base Esperanza in Argentine Antarctica, on 6030 Kilohertz on the 49 meter band, together with the transmitters that make up the official radio network...

The first transmissions were relayed from LRA10 in Ushuaia and LRA24 in Río Grande. The first song played was "La Primavera", a milonga song by Víctor Velásquez. The first program was "Horizontes de Hielo" (Ice Horizons), a show about activities taking place at Esperanza base and the community of Fortín Sargento Cabral. It also provided news from other Argentinian bases, plus information about glaciers and the weather.

LRA36 is operated by personnel from the Argintine Army who are dedicated to the control, maintenance, and operation of the equipment, and its announcers are wives of the soldiers. Before arriving at the base, the personnel (three announcers and one operator) take a two-month course from the Instituto Superior de Enseñanza Radiofónica. The base's library is also located at the station's facilities.

The station's purpose is to establish ties in Antarctica and spread the Argentina's culture. Inside the base, the staff are accompanied on their daily tasks and play Argentinian music. To spread knowledge of their culture, they broadcast information about Argentinian customs. They also discuss their activities and Argentina's presence in Antarctica.

Initially, Radio Nacional Arcańgel San Gabriel transmitted on 6030 kHz in the 49-meter shortwave band with a power of 1.2 kW. The shortwave transmissions caught the attention of the other bases in Argentine Antarctica, mainland Argentina, and listeners across the world.

== Programming ==
LRA36 broadcasts on shortwave from Monday to Friday, from 3:00 to 6:00 PM Argentina time, and from 8:00 AM to 12:00 PM on FM, with a news and general interest program ("Noticias y Deportes" or "News and Sports") that includes national and international news, the weather on Argentine Antarctic bases as well as the mainland, dates of interest, and musical requests. On some occasions, they include shoutouts from friends and family from the mainland to surprise those working at the base. Meteorological information is provided for both Esperanza base and Marambio Base.

In 2003, students and teachers at the school on the base, Raúl Ricardo Alfonsín National No. 38, started a radio show called "Pingüinitos al Aire" (Penguins on the Air) transmitted on LRA 36. Another radio show called "Argentinos en la Antártida" (Argentinians in the Antarctic) tells the tales of Argintians notable for their achievements in the Antarctic. Another show called "Reflexiones" (Reflections) features readings of books and quotes.

The show "Ciencia y Técnica" (Science and Technology) discusses world news in science and technology. "Efeméride y Santoral" (Holidays and Feasts) recalls historical events and saints' feasts every day. "Turismo" (Tourism) covers the most popular tourist attractions in Argentina. Finally, another show is called "Costumbres y leyendas argentinas" (Argentine Customs and Legends).

The stations include a program in the afternoon, Monday through Friday from 3:00 to 6:00 PM, called "De Esperanza al Mundo" (From Hope to the World) that is listened to by DXers from many countries.

== See also ==
- LRA Radio Nacional
- Esperanza Base
- Argentine Antarctica
- Telecommunications in Antarctica
- American Forces Network
- Instituto Antártico Argentino
