= Antonio Carrizo =

Argentine radio and television presenter

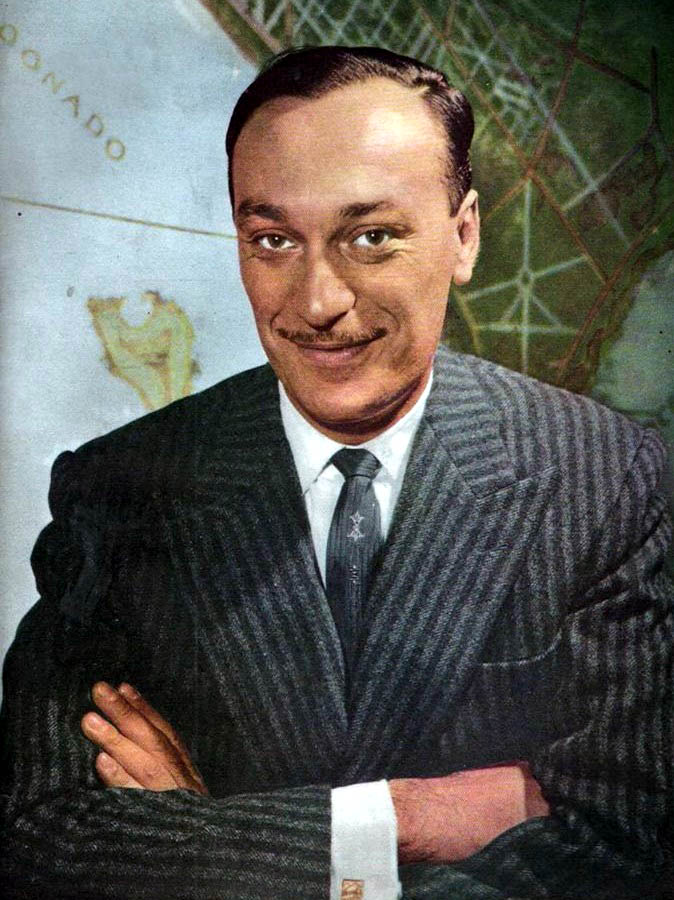
- Carrizo, c. 1950s
- Born: Antonio Carrozzi Abascal; September 15, 1926; General Villegas, Argentina
- Died: January 1, 2016 (aged 89); Buenos Aires, Argentina

Antonio Carrozzi Abascal, best known as Antonio Carrizo, (September 15, 1926 – January 1, 2016) was an Argentine radio and television presenter.

== Biography ==
Born in General Villegas, in western Buenos Aires Province, his first experience in broadcasting was during his teens at the helm of a transit media vehicle, from which he could be heard hawking Mejoral, a paracetamol analgesic, in General Villegas and surrounding Pampas towns. He arrived in Buenos Aires following a year of military service, and began on the radio as an ad announcer on Radio del Pueblo in 1948. He later co-hosted a program on ratings leader Radio Belgrano with Beatriz Taibo, in which the duo became known for announcing advertisements in the form of a dialogue. Taibo, for example, might ask: "Traffic's at a standstill. What do you think happened?" to which Carrizo would answer "A Sunlight girl must have walked by!"

The radio theater producer at Radio El Mundo, Julio César Barton, hired Carrizo in 1949. He worked with leading names in Argentine radio at the time such as Niní Marshall, Tita Merello, and Luis Sandrini, eventually becoming the station's programming director. Remaining on the radio, Carrizo debuted on Argentine television in the 1950s on Channel 7, and in cinema as a radio presenter in Luis César Amadori's El barro humano (1955). Carrizo was hired by Channel 9 director Alejandro Romay to host Sábados Continuados in 1964. He returned to Channel 7 as host of Bienvenido Sábado (Welcome, Saturday), a variety show that aired in 1965, and in the 1970s hosted Primera de la Noche (Top of the Evening). Carrizo also appeared from 1966 on Radio Rivadavia, which by then had become the nation's top radio network, working with Cacho Fontana, Héctor Larrea, and Juan Carlos Mareco, and in 1971 left El Mundo to become host of Rivadavia's La Vida y El Canto (Life and Song). The urbane talk show, which ran for twenty years, drew guests from Argentine music, cinema, and literature (including Jorge Luis Borges, with whom he taped Borges, el Memorioso in 1979), as well as foreign guests such as Italian cinema great Vittorio Gassman. He also hosted Cíclo Los Intérpretes (Performers' Series) on Radio Rivadavia, devoted to folk and classical music, and appeared as a recurring guest commentator on the popular round table program Polémica en el Fútbol (Controversies in Argentine Football). Carrizo earned a Konex Award for his career as presenter in 1981.

Carrizo was named President of the Society of Argentine Bibliophiles, and of the Argentine Chess Federation. The accomplished chess player counted among his friends Grand Master Bobby Fischer. Fischer visited Argentina often, and Carrizo's home hosted numerous matches between the two, as well as with other noted players such as Tigran Petrosian and Miguel Quinteros; during one such match, which Fischer and Quinteros played for money, the unpredictable Fischer repeatedly slammed the Japanese forest glass coffee table, prompting Carrizo to urge Quinteros to lower the stakes, "lest that son of a bitch break my table!"

His later projects included serving as master of ceremonies at the 1980 OTI Festival, as well as the annual Ciclo Música en la Ciudad (City Music Series), a classical music festival, from 1987 onward. He joined Juan Carlos Calabró as co-host of the radio comedy series, Calabromas, and its long-running television counterpart: El contra (The Jerk, Calabró's stock character). Carrizo served as Cultural Attaché to the Argentine Embassy in Spain during the 1990s, and was bestowed the Order of Isabella the Catholic. He later hosted El Locutorio (The Broadcast Room), a cultural program, and Papeles Sueltos (Loose Papers), an intellectual round table show. He also hosted, among other programs, Hecho en Argentina, a geographic documentary series on the América 24 cable network, and from 2006 onward Tangos y Libros on Municipal Radio.

Because he hosted a tango program on AM radio, Carrizo maintained a connection to the people that allowed him to bring high-culture to them. On his interview program thus he could introduce his audiences to such figures as Jorge Luis Borges and Astor Piazzolla.

Carrizo's health worsened, and in 2008 he underwent cardiopulmonary bypass and cerebrovascular surgery. He recovered, returned as host of Tangos y Libros, and in 2010 was awarded the Argentina Bicentennial Medal by Buenos Aires Mayor Mauricio Macri. Carrizo, whose career spanned seven decades, earned widespread respect among colleagues and listeners for his authoritative intonation and cultural breadth. He became known as el señor de la radio ("the lord of the radio") in Argentina.

He died on January 1, 2016.
