= Radio AM 750 =

AM 750
- Buenos Aires; Argentina
- Frequency: 750 kHz

Programming
- Language: Spanish

Ownership
- Operator: Grupo Octubre
- Sister stations: Radio Malena (Vía Streaming); Radio Oktubre (Vía Streaming); Mucha Radio 94.7; Blackie 89.1; Aspen 102.3; FM Like 89.5

Links
- Website: pagina12.com.ar/am750

AM 750 is an Argentinian radio station that broadcasts from the city of Buenos Aires.

== History ==
AM 750 began broadcasting from Venezuela 370, which was the address of the Cultural Caras and Caretas Center, under a license given by the state of Argentina to Buenos Contenidos SRL. In 2022, the station moved their most important studios to the address Emilio Ravignani 1732, which is in San Telmo.

== Programming ==
Originally, AM 750 was focused on music and culture. Over time, they incorporated programs which were journalistic, political, and of general interest.

In April 2016, the station's programming was rebooted, adding Víctor Hugo Morales (who was dismissed from Radio Continental in 2016), Claudio Villarruel, Bernarda Llorente, Any Ventura and Gonzalo Bonadeo. In September 2016, Alejandro Dolina joined with the program the venganza será terrible. (English: The revenge will be terrible.)

== Sports ==
Historically, the AM 750 did not cover sports. However, in march of 2012, they added the program "Somos Boca", coming from AM 770 cooperatively, which followed the company of Boca Juniors with Javier Simone and Sebastián Sellaro from Monday to Friday.

Somos Boca ended in April 2016 to make room for the program Arqueros, ilusionistas and goleadores with Gonzalo Bonadeo, Ariel Scher, Ezequiel Fernández Moores and Guido Bercovich from Monday to Friday from 6:00 to 8:00 PM.

Javier Simone and Sebastián Sellaro continued as part of the station with the program Boca, the transmisión on Sundays from 6:00 PM to 9:00 PM until march of 2017.

Since march of 2017, Víctor Hugo Morales hosts on Sundays from 1 PM to 10 PM on AM 750.

== License ==
The license of the AM 750 was awarded publicly by the Official Bulletin of the Republic of Argentina on the 10th of November, 2008. It was the last radio frequency licensed by the state. The service was facilitated through resolution 69-AFSCA/2010 of the Federal Authority for Audiovisual Communication Services. It is a company of the October Foundation of Construction Workers and the Single Union of Workers of Rental and Horizontal Buildings, commanded by Víctor Santa María.

== Channels ==
- Mar del Plata - Buenos Aires - 96.5 MHz
- Bahía Blanca - Buenos Aires - 93.9 MHz
- Junín - Buenos Aires - 106.9 Mhz
- Río Cuarto - Córdoba - 101.9 MHz
- Posadas - Misiones - 89.5 MHz
- Salta - 104.5 MHz
- Neuquén - 99.7 MHz
- Chajarí - Entre Ríos - 102.9 MHz

== Audience ==
In 2016, after the victory of Mauricio Macri in the presidential election, accompanied by the exit of Víctor Hugo Morales from Radio Continental and of the total renovation of the programming of Radio Nacional, they experienced an increase in the audience of the radio station because it was seen as media opposing the government of Macri. At the end of 2016, it occupied the fifth spot thanks to renovated programming schedule with Morales hosting the second morning and Alejandro Dolina at the midnight.
