= 750 AM =

AM radio frequency

The following radio stations broadcast on AM frequency 750 kHz: 750 AM is classified as a United States and Canadian clear-channel frequency by the Federal Communications Commission. WSB Atlanta, KFQD Anchorage and CBGY Bonavista, Newfoundland and Labrador, share Class A status on 750 kHz.

== Argentina ==
- LRL203 in Buenos Aires
- LRA7 in Córdoba

== Canada ==
Stations in bold are clear-channel stations.

Call sign	City of license	Daytime power (kW)	Nighttime power (kW)	Transmitter coordinates
**CBGY**	Bonavista, Newfoundland and Labrador	10	10	48.6742°N 53.7719°W
CKJH	Melfort, Saskatchewan	25	25	52.6125°N 104.505°W

== Mexico ==
- XEJMN-AM in Jesus Maria, Nayarit
- XETI-AM in Tempoal, Veracruz
- XEUORN-AM in Uruapan, Michoacan

== United States ==
Stations in bold are clear-channel stations.

Call sign	City of license	Facility ID	Class	Daytime power (kW)	Nighttime power (kW)	Unlimited power (kW)	Transmitter coordinates
KAMA	El Paso, Texas	36948	B	10	1		31.775°N 106.28°W
KBNN	Lebanon, Missouri	51093	D	5			37.686389°N 92.693056°W
KERR	Polson, Montana	2208	B	50	1		47.642778°N 114.123611°W
**KFQD**	Anchorage, Alaska	52675	A	50	50		61.338333°N 150.034167°W
KKNO	Gretna, Louisiana	56784	D	0.25			29.8875°N 90.084167°W
KMMJ	Grand Island, Nebraska	9937	B			10.5	41.134722°N 97.993889°W
KOAL	Price, Utah	18389	B	10	6.8		39.566944°N 110.800556°W
KSEO	Durant, Oklahoma	17755	D	0.22			34.036667°N 96.426944°W
KXTG	Portland, Oregon	948	B	50	20		45.401389°N 122.446389°W
WAUG	New Hope, North Carolina	58586	D	0.5			35.791111°N 78.619444°W
WBMD	Baltimore, Maryland	1913	D	0.8			39.311667°N 76.491389°W
WGMF	Olyphant, Pennsylvania	8092	D	1.6			41.476111°N 75.494722°W
WNDZ	Portage, Indiana	73316	D	15			41.563611°N 87.155°W
WRIK	Brookport, Illinois	63816	D	0.5			37.141944°N 83.649444°W
**WSB**	Atlanta, Georgia	73977	A			50	33.843889°N 84.253333°W

== Venezuela ==
- YVKS at Caracas
