= Strolling =

Walking for recreation

Strolling is walking along or through at a leisurely pace. Strolling is a pastime and activity enjoyed worldwide as a leisure activity. The object of strolling is to walk at a slightly slower pace in an attempt to absorb the surroundings.

Works featuring the flâneur, French for a “strolling urban observer”, have appeared in European and American literature since the late 18th century.

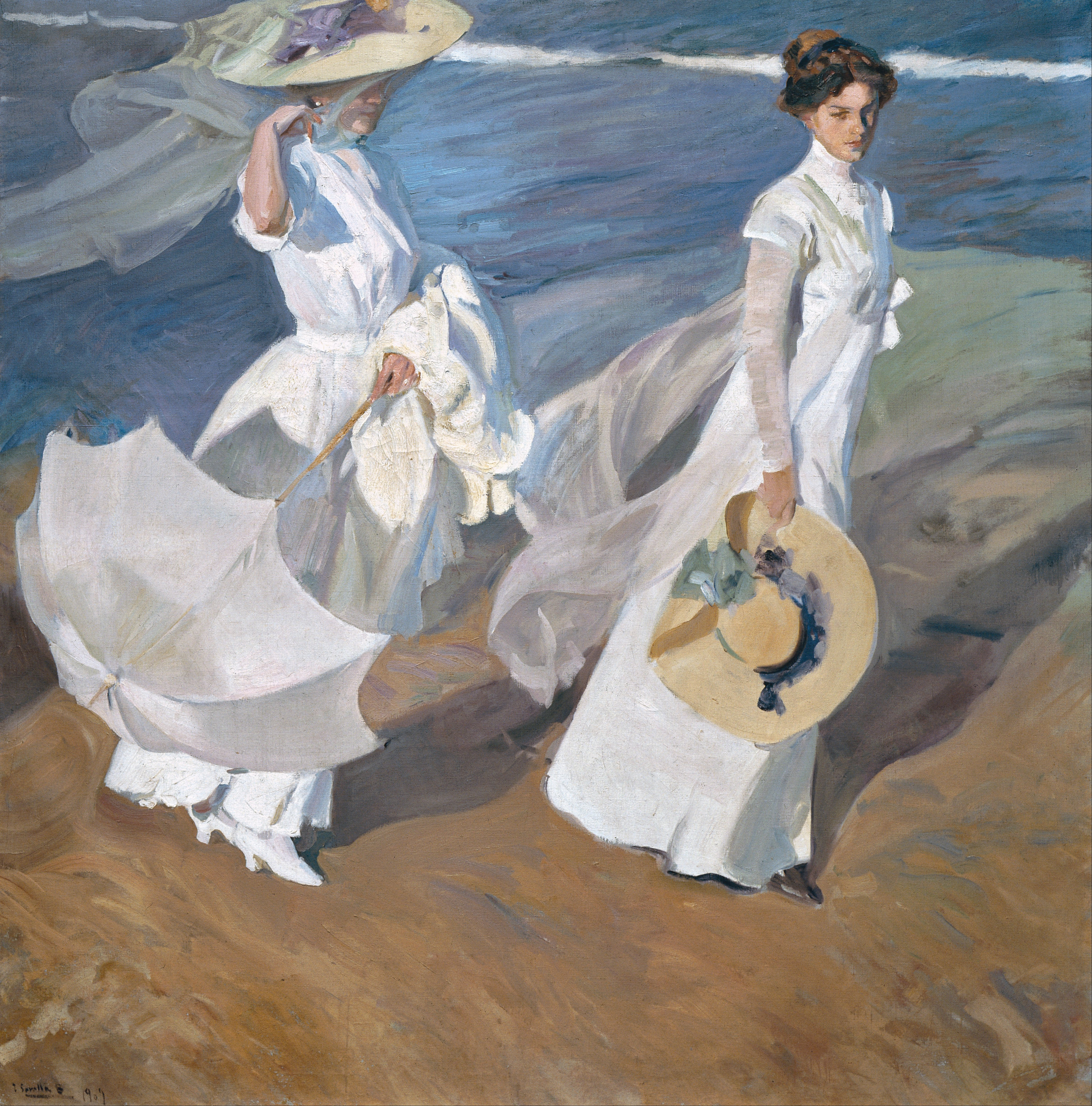
Joaquín Sorolla y Bastida, Strolling along the Seashore, 1909 (Sorolla Museum)

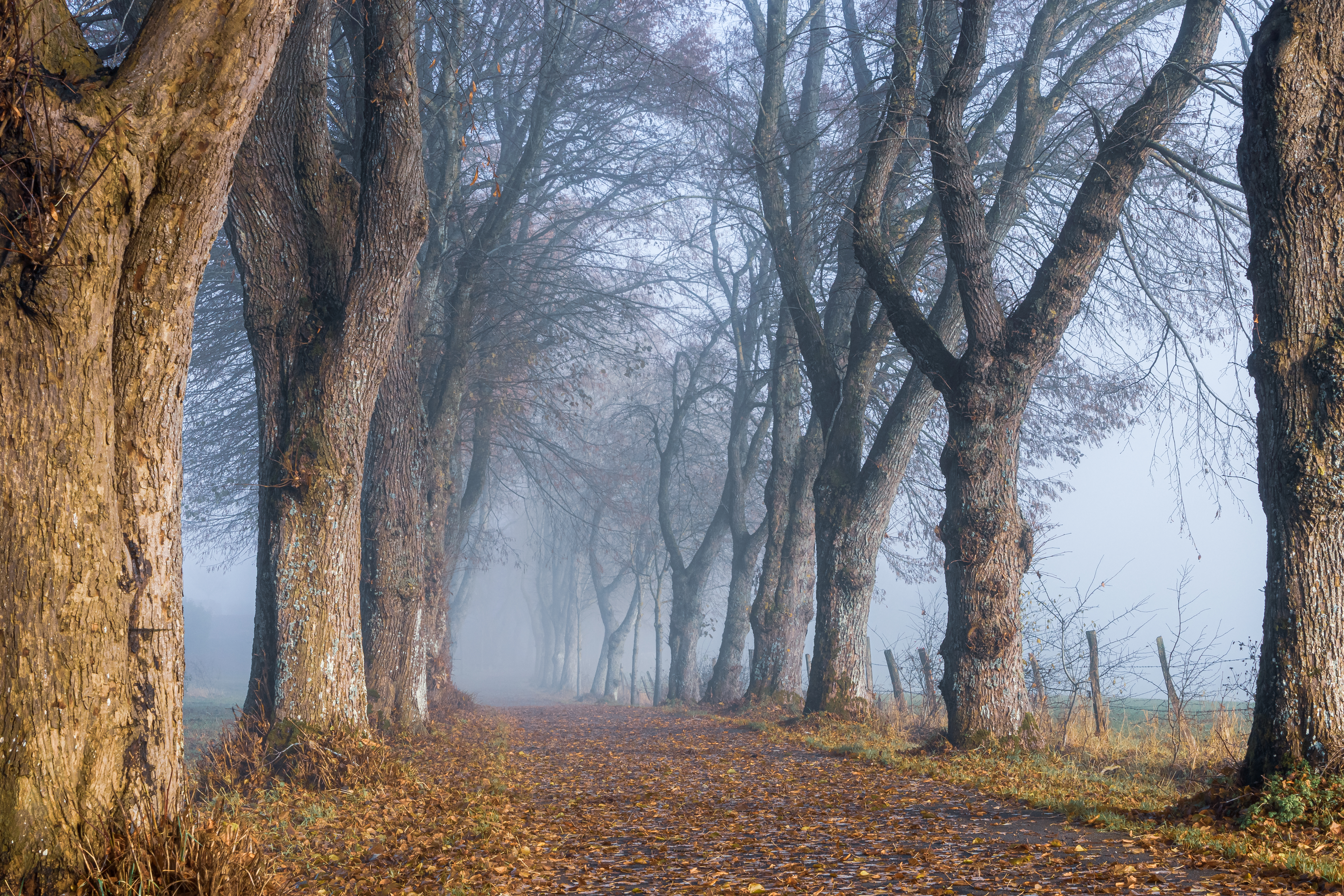
A wooded area is an ideal locale for an evening stroll (Dahlem)

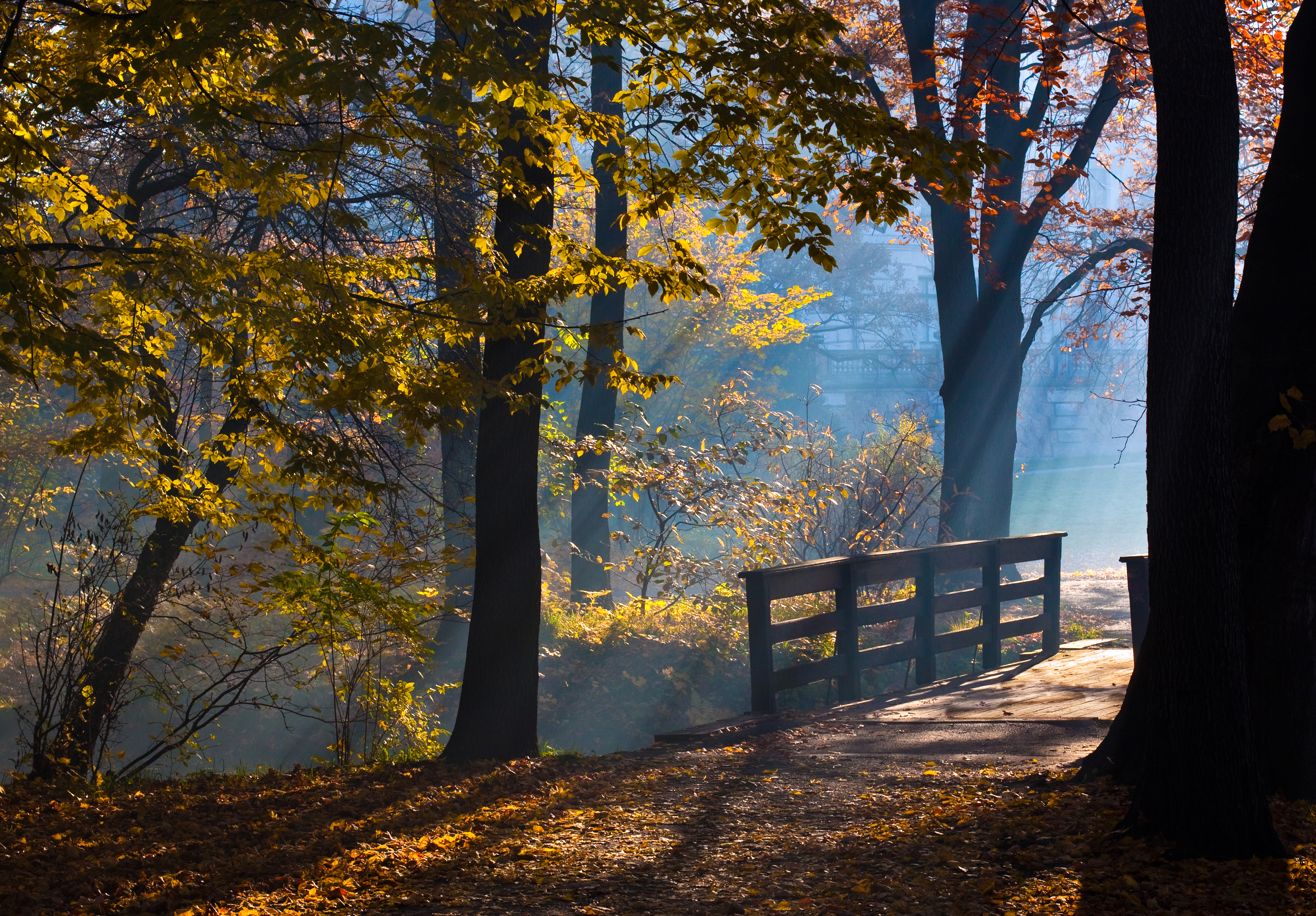
Strolling over a bridge in Pszczyna

== Etymology ==
The verb form of "stroll" may have originated from a c.1600 Cant word. This word may have been derived from the German word strollen, which in itself is a derivative of the German word strolchen, which means "to roam, travel about aimlessly, drift, rove." The German noun strolch refers to any sort of vagabond or rogue.

Before the American Revolution, a stroller was the British word for a vagabond.

The noun stroll came from the verb in 1814. The term "stroller" was coined in the 1920s as a "child’s push-chair". The modern-day usage of the word "stroll" does not differ greatly from its older derivatives.

Technological advances in strolling.

== Health outcomes ==
Strolling is not an aerobic exercise. The body's energy demands whilst strolling do not require extra oxygen. Physicians therefore do not recommend strolling, but rather recommend more vigorous and aerobic forms of exercise. The American Medical Association's committee on Exercise and Physical Fitness has stated that "walking briskly, not just strolling, is the simplest and also one of the best forms of exercise".

Researchers investigating the cognitive benefits to exercise have also concluded that strolling results in no significant gains to cognitive health as people age. Brisk walking and other everyday activities, such as house work or gardening, have demonstrated significant benefits to prevention of cognitive decline as the population ages.

Other researchers at the Mayo Clinic posit that all activity that is not sleeping, eating, or sports activity still contributes to overall health. This has been named "Non-exercise activity thermogenesis" (NEAT) and includes everything from strolling to fidgeting in the analysis of energy consumption. Utilizing NEAT research has generated many ideas about social design of offices, schools, and living spaces to promote any physical activity, such as removing places to sit to promote standing and pacing. The body operates at a more balanced level when strolling. The heart beat is more balanced. The blood pressure is well balanced.

== International traditions ==
In Spain, a stroll is called a Paseo and is a popular after-dinner pastime. The participants, whose membership is egalitarian, wear their best clothing. Activities include chatting with neighbors and acquaintances, flirting, and gossiping. Several streets in countries with a Spanish cultural history incorporate the word: Paseo de la Reforma in Mexico City, Paseo del Prado, Havana, Paseo de Roxas in the Philippines, and Buenos Aires's Paseo La Plaza.

The similar, and widespread custom in Italy for an evening walk is called la passeggiata.

Strolling or walking (Russian: гулять, gulyat') is very common in the Russian society. In contrast to many western countries strolling is very common among young people in Russia. Young people often arrange just to go for a walk. Besides the verb, the experience itself, which describes the time span of the walk, is called progulka (Russian: прогулка). Walking is so important in Russian culture that gulyat' also is a synonym for "to party".

The 19th-century Russian literary critic Vissarion Belinsky described St. Petersburg as the center of urban strolling in that country, by contrast with Moscow. Rural strolls have long been a staple of Russian fiction and songs; Tchaikovsky composed a musical accompaniment to the Nikolay Grekov poem “We haven’t long to stroll”.

== See also ==
- Strolling players
