= Paseo La Plaza =

Coordinates: 34°36′19″S 58°23′24″W

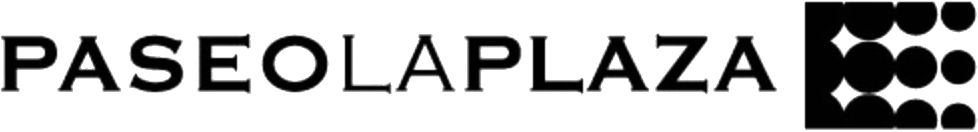
- Address: Av. Corrientes 1660, Buenos Aires
- Opened: September 1989; 37 years ago
- Owner: Grupo La Plaza
- Website: paseolaplaza.com.ar

Paseo La Plaza is a cultural and commercial complex in the San Nicolás neighborhood of Buenos Aires, Argentina. The complex hosts theater performances and various types of congresses and conventions. It also has gastronomic and commercial venues. It is located in the heart of the theater area of Avenida Corrientes, near the General San Martín Theater, the General San Martín Cultural Center and other prominent venues.

The complex is owned and managed by Grupo La Plaza, which also owns the Metropolitan Sura theatre. As of 2020, Paseo La Plaza had two theatres and 22 commercial stores (10 of them were restaurants), directly employing 150 people.

== Overview ==
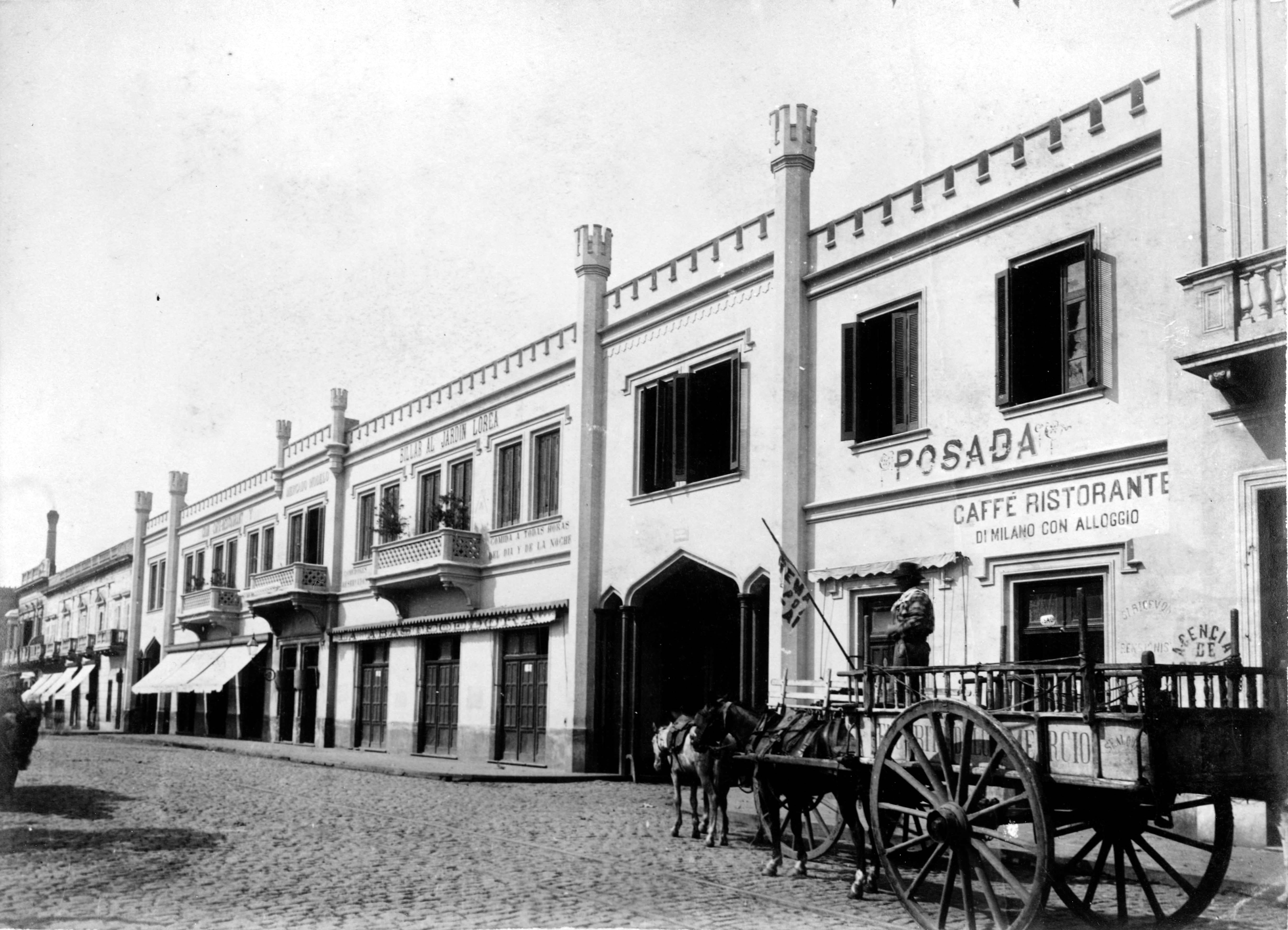
Facade of Mercado Nuevo prior to its demolition

Paseo La Plaza was built where the bustling Mercado Modelo once stood. Serving residents in or near the 1600 block of Corrientes Avenue for much of the twentieth century, the ornate market hall was also popular for its Bachín y Pichín Restaurant. Shuttered during Argentina's difficult 1980s, the central location of the acre-size lot quickly attracted investors' interest, however, and the property was purchased by the La Plaza Group, a theatre production company led by Pablo Kompel.

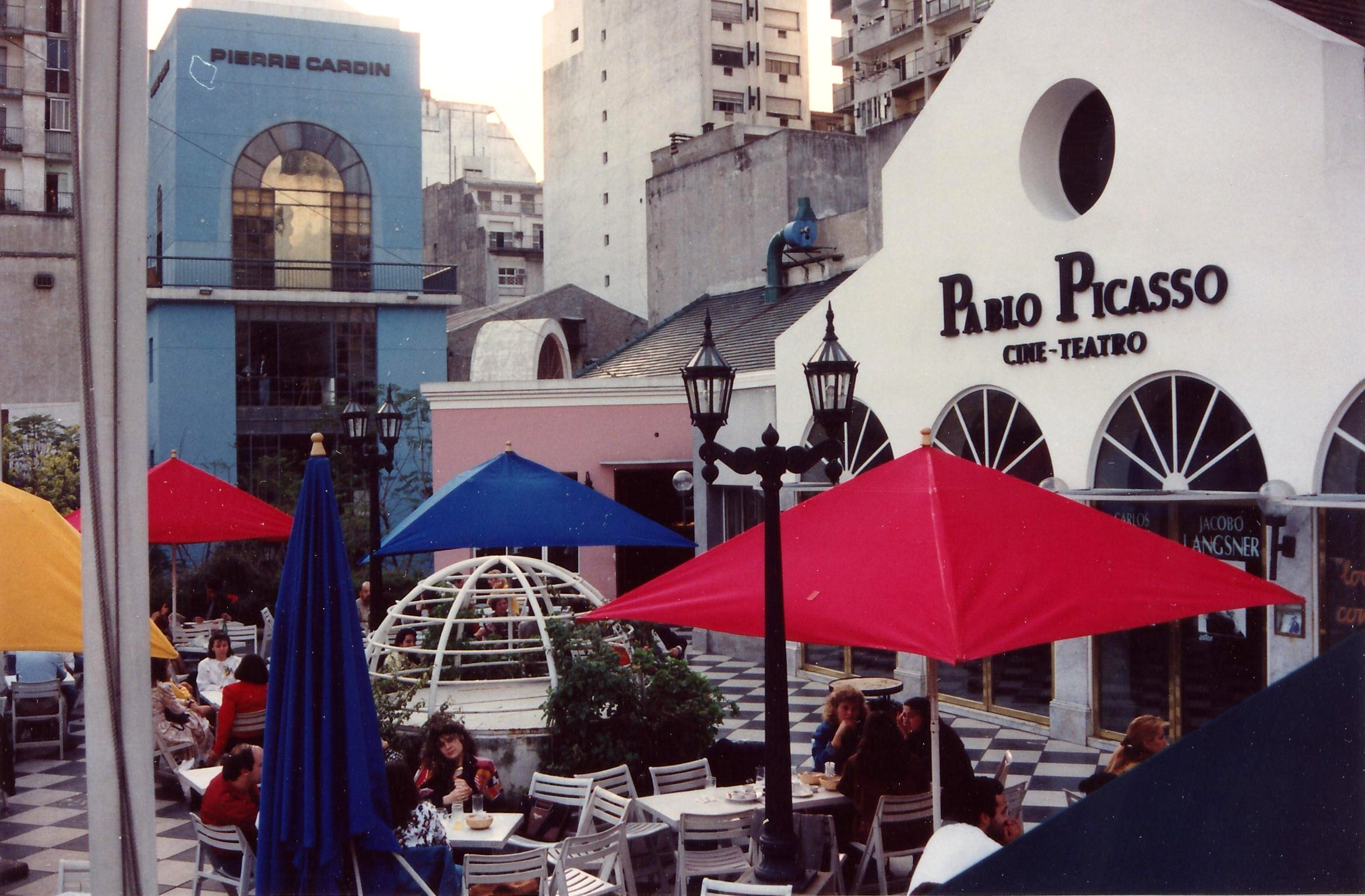
Pablo Picasso theatre

The market hall was demolished in favor of an open-air center, though a number of the former building's features, such as its colonnade and porticos, were preserved. The Pablo Neruda Salon, a theater and cinema hall, was opened on July 12, 1989, with a performance by world-renowned mime Marcel Marceau, and the entire center was formally inaugurated on September 28.

Lushly landscaped, Paseo La Plaza was designed as an urban oasis in one of Buenos Aires' most densely populated areas. A cultural as well as commercial center, it continues to host an active repertoire in its two theatres: the Pablo Neruda and Pablo Picasso Salons (with 520 and 440 seats, respectively), as well as in its patio amphitheater. The Neruda Salon also hosts local radio host Alejandro Dolina's news and commentary program, La venganza será terrible. The development, the first of its kind in Buenos Aires, attracts over 350,000 theater-goers a year, becoming the most important such center in Argentina.

The center also includes a small convention center for up to 1200 visitors, divided into the Alfonsina Storni, Pablo Casals and Julio Cortázar Rooms. A promenade of 21 retail outlets, and 14 restaurants and bars, is interspersed along the patios; in all, Paseo La Plaza attracts around half a million visitors a month.
