= Héctor Larrea =

Argentine radio and television host

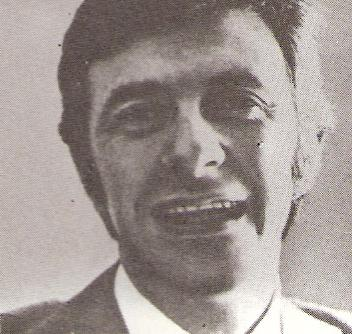
- Born: October 30, 1938 (age 87); Bragado, Buenos Aires Province

Héctor Larrea (born October 30, 1938) is an Argentine radio and television host.

== Life and work ==
Larrea was born in Bragado, Buenos Aires Province, in 1938. He lost his father at age nine, and found comfort with his mother in radio broadcasting, particularly tango shows. He participated in high school plays, and following graduation, attended the Institute of Higher Radio Broadcasting Studies (ISER) in Buenos Aires. He met his first wife, Leonor Ferrara, at ISER, and earned a degree in broadcasting in 1962. He debuted on the radio at LOR Radio Argentina, and shortly afterward on television as co-host with Nelly Raymond of La campana de cristal, a talk show.

Larrea later worked the presenter on El show de Sandro (a musical program hosted by popular crooner Sandro de América), as well as for numerous tango orchestras. He inaugurated what would become his signature radio program, Rapidísimo, in 1967, which would be broadcast on several radio stations for the next 35 years, most of them on Radio Rivadavia. Larrea designed the format for the show, which in English would translate as "Promptly," to air a variety of music in its 30 minute morning rush hour slot. He became known to listeners for his hurried, yet precise, speech, and the show was among the first in Argentina to include on-air caller requests and participation. Rapidísimo won the host numerous Martín Fierro Awards, making him among the broadcasters most so honored.

He remained active in television, and hosted the comedy sketch show, Humor redondo, in 1968, the children's show, El mundo de Calculín (based on Manuel García Ferré's cartoon characters) in 1976, and the sitcom, Totalmente, in 1999, among other programs. Larrea, who lost his second wife to breast cancer, underwent a number of surgeries to remove polyps in 2000 and 2001, and to repair a broken meniscus suffered in a fall in 2004. He recovered, and hosted the Broadway theatre premiere of Juan de Dios Filiberto's Quejas de Bandoneón. Disputes with the new management at Radio Rivadavia forced Larrea to cancel the long-running Rapidísimo in 2004, however, though he continued as host of Una vuelta Nacional, a show he launched at the public LRA Radio Nacional in 2003.
