= Carlos Nine =

Argentine cartoonist, painter, and sculptor

Carlos Nine (21 February 1944 – 16 July 2016) was an Argentine cartoonist, painter, and sculptor.

== Biography ==
Between 1983 and 1990 Nine drew several covers for the magazine Humor, directed by his colleague Andrés Cascioli.

He made illustrations for the magazines Fierro, L'Écho des Savanes, Il Grifo, Co & Co, Notícias and for the American, Argentine and Italian editions of Playboy. His drawings appeared regularly in the daily newspapers Clarín and Le Monde. Nine illustrated the first editions of the Chronicles of the Grey Angel and The book of the ghost, of Alejandro Dolina. In France edited, among others, the books Crimes and Punishments (1991) and Fantagas (1995), with texts and own drawings.

In 2005 he made an adaptation of the chapter 16 of the first part of Don Quijote in the collective work Lanza en astillero.

In 2012 Carlos Nine received the Platinum Konex Award as best illustrator of the decade in Argentina.

He died on 16 July 2016 at the age of 72.

He also drew Donjon Monsters 8 Heartbreaker, written by Lewis Trondheim and Joann Sfar.

== Books ==
=== Text and drawings ===
- Meutres et chatiments (1991).
- Fantagas (1995).
- Keko el mago (1996).
- Le canard qui aimait les poules (1999).
- Oh merde, les lapins! (2002).
- Gesta Dei (2003).
- It was a Dark & Silly night (2003).
- Prints of the west (2004).
- Siboney (Fantagas 2) (2008).
- Keko Le Magicien (2009).
- Rapport visuel sur la ville de Buenos Aires et ses environs (2014).
- Tropikal Mambo (2016).
- Fantagas: L'intégrale (2016).
- Buster Mix (2020).

=== Illustration only ===
- Crónicas del Ángel Gris (1988), by Alejandro Dolina
- La edad del pavo (1990), by Elsa Bornemann
- Much ado about nothing (1995), by William Shakespeare.
- Swan Lake (1999), by Piotr Chaikovski.
- Le lac des cygnes (1999), by Piotr Chaikovski.
- El libro del fantasma (1999), by Alejandro Dolina.
- Pampa (three volumes, 2003-2005), with Jorge Zentner.
- L'amirale des mers du Sud (2019), with Jorge Zentner.

== Bibliography ==
- Guiral, Antoni (2012). Del tebeo al manga: Una historia de los cómics 9. Revistas de aventuras y de cómic para adultos. Barcelona: Panini España. ISBN 978-84-9885-903-4. Depósito Legal: GI.169-2007.
