= Las 24 horas de las Malvinas =

- Genre: Telethon
- Presented by: Pinky; Cacho Fontana
- Country of origin: Argentina
- Original language: Spanish
- No. of episodes: 1

Production
- Running time: 1440 minutes

Original release
- Network: Argentina Televisora Color
- Release: May 8 – May 9, 1982

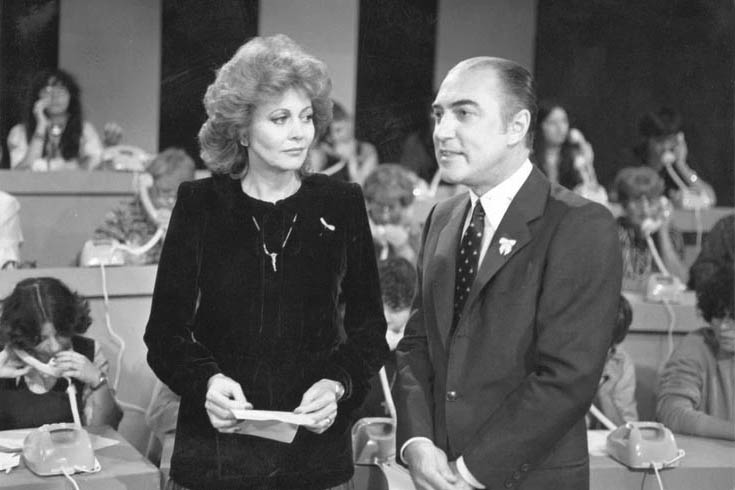
Lidia Satragno (Pinki) and Cacho Fontana during the "Las 24 horas de Malvinas" live show.

Las 24 horas de las Malvinas ("The 24 Hours of the Malvinas/Falklands") was a 24-hour television program broadcast in 1982 to raise funds for the Argentine armed forces who went to fight in the Falklands War.

The program attracted scrutiny over how the money raised was handled; although the destination of the money raised could not be clearly established, it is generally believed from the statements of people involved that either the whole sum or a large part of it never reached its destination.

== Overview ==
The program was hosted for a continuous 24-hour period by presenters Lidia Elsa Satragno, better known as "Pinky," and Jorge "Cacho" Fontana. The program, produced by Argentina Televisora Color (ATC), exalted the patriotic spirit of the audience, and brought together dozens of actors who donated personal belongings, and donations from viewers were received that were used to raise funds for the men who had gone to fight in the Falkland Islands.

Among the figures who participated in the broadcast were Arturo Puig, Andrea del Boca, Susana Giménez, Diego Maradona, Daniel Passarella, Mariano Mores, Mirtha Legrand, Libertad Lamarque, Norma Aleandro, Haydée Padilla, Jorge Porcel, Santiago Gómez Cou, Pierina Dealessi and Ricardo Darín, among others.

As detailed in her work by Mirta Varela, researcher at the National Scientific and Technical Research Council (CONICET):

Toda la puesta en escena pertenece al armado de un gran espectáculo que da cuenta de la especificidad de la televisión como aparato para la producción de hechos, productora de realidad, que permite la construcción de un programa excepcional para los tiempos excepcionales que corren. Un programa que interrumpe la grilla televisiva para transmitir en vivo 24 horas seguidas. El formato se asemeja a los programas ómnibus caracterizados por su larga duración, que protagonizaban la pantalla de los fines de semana durante las décadas del '60 y '70.
[The entire staging is part of a grand spectacle that captures the specific nature of television as a device for producing events, a producer of reality, allowing for the construction of an exceptional program for these exceptional times. A program that interrupts the television schedule to broadcast live 24 hours a day. The format resembles the long-running omnibus programs that dominated weekend television during the 1960s and 1970s.]

— Mirta Varela, CONICET researcher,

Soccer player Diego Maradona donated a check for $L100,000,000 (US$7,117 at the time), which was delivered by his then-representative Jorge Cyterszpiler. In addition, jewelry, coats, and other items were collected. At the end of the program, a total of $22,874,769,000 pesos ley (equivalent to US$ 1,628,097 at the time) was delivered, which — integrated into the Fondo Patriótico Malvinas Argentinas ("Argentine Malvinas Patriotic Fund") which had been created by Decree No. 759— the majority of the press and the public believe never reached its destination, based on interviews with people involved in the broadcast.

In an interview in 2005, Vice Commodore Juan Carlos Rogani, in charge of managing donations for the war, acknowledged that objects that were considered "of no commercial value", mostly those that were tokens of affection from the Argentine population towards the soldiers fighting in the war, were discarded. He stated:

Se decidió que los objetos sin valor comercial fueran a la basura. Las cartas, los cuadritos, las bufandas no eran vitales, tendrían Prioridad Número 100. Despachar un Hércules para llevar esas cositas no valia la pena, no justificaba el costo de la operación.
[It was decided that items of no commercial value would go in the trash. Letters, paintings, and scarves weren't vital; they would receive Priority Number 100. Sending a Hercules to transport those little things wasn't worth the effort; it didn't justify the cost of the operation.]
