= Liliana Caldini =

Argentine actress and model (1951–2022)

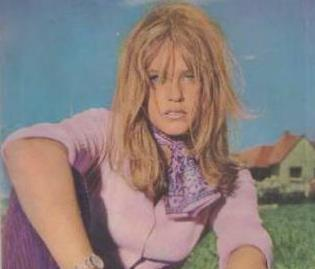
- Caldini in 1970
- Born: 26 August 1951
- Died: 3 July 2022 (aged 70)
- Occupation(s): Model, actress, television show host

Liliana Caldini (26 August 1951 – 3 July 2022) was an Argentine model, actress, and television show host.

She became famous in Argentina at age 18, after appearing in a television commercial for the cigarette brand named Chesterfield.

She later acted in Argentine films, including El extrano del pelo largo (The Long Haired Stranger). She also acted in an Argentine television series, Los Campanelli (The Campanellis).

== Personal life ==
Caldini married Cacho Fontana, an Argentine celebrity himself, in 1971. The couple had twin daughters Antonella and Lumilla Fontana in 1978. Fontana and Caldini were divorced in 1983. Her daughter Lumilla lives in Spain. Caldini also has two grandsons. Cacho Fontana died two days after her, on 5 July 2022.

== See also ==
- List of Argentines
