= Lidia Elsa Satragno =

Argentine actress and politician (1935–2022)

Lidia Satragno
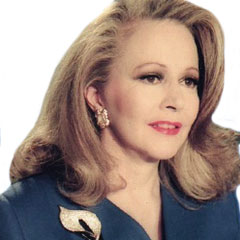

National Deputy
- In office 10 December 2007 – 10 December 2011
- Constituency: Buenos Aires

Personal details
- Born: 11 November 1935 San Justo, Buenos Aires, Argentina
- Died: 8 December 2022 (aged 87) Buenos Aires, Argentina
- Party: Radical Civic Union
- Other political affiliations: Alliance (1999–2001); PRO Union (2007–2011)

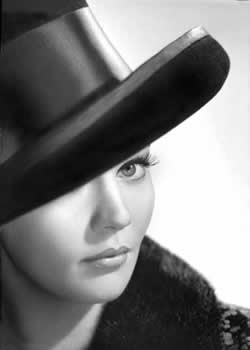
Pinky in 1964, photographed by Annemarie Heinrich.

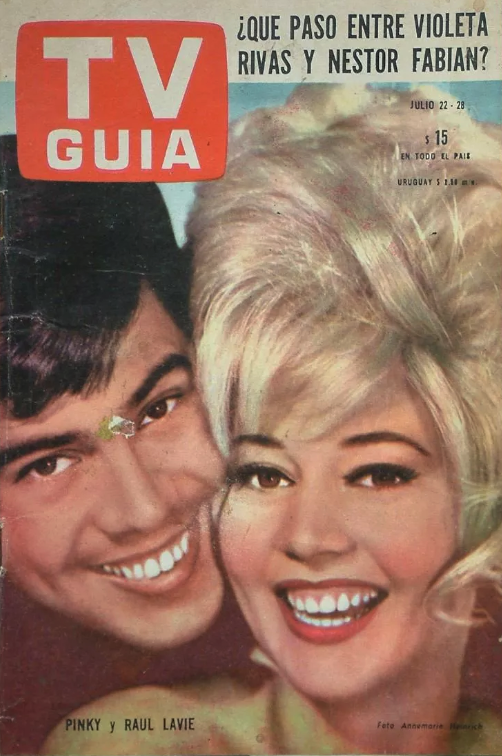
Pinky and her husband Raúl Lavié, 1964

Lidia Elsa Satragno (11 November 1935 – 8 December 2022) was an Argentine actress and politician, where she was popularly known as Pinky.

== Early life and career ==
Lidia Elsa Satragno was born in the western Buenos Aires suburb of San Justo in 1935. She debuted on Argentine television in a 1956 vinegar advertisement and, by 1957, appeared on as many as 22 television ads on any given day. This success led to her own talk show on Argentine Public Television, Buenos Días Pinky, during which she was invited as a guest of honor by German Chancellor Konrad Adenauer. The show also earned renown for its screenwriter, María Elena Walsh, and helped pave the way for women in Argentine television, generally. Cast by noted period piece Director Leopoldo Torre Nilsson in La caída (The Fall) in 1959, in 1961 she was offered a co-anchorship in news anchorman Bernardo Neustadt's Nosotros (Us), becoming the first Argentine woman on television so honored. Co-hosting Incomunicados with Neustadt in 1963, the show became memorable for an interview held with Arturo Frondizi, the first granted by a former president on Argentine television. Her work with Neustadt and introduction to the world of politics led to a friendship with a young UCR strategist, Rodolfo Terragno, that she maintained.

Pinky hosted or co-hosted a number of other talk and variety shows during the 1960s and 1970s, the most successful of which were Feminísima, El pueblo quiere saber (People Want to Know), Pinky y la noticia (Pinky and the News) and La década del '60. She set time aside for other projects, as well, cast by Argentine and Mexican directors in a number of film roles in the 1960s. One of her interview guests in 1962, a rising figure in Argentine tango named Raúl Lavié, had recently been separated and quickly developed a relationship with the avuncular hostess; the two were married in 1965.

== Later career ==
Enjoying a stellar career, she soon became known as "Ms. Television" in Argentina, though her private life entered a difficult phase. She and Lavié had two sons, but soon grew apart and were separated and reunited a number of times before parting ways in 1974, something Pinky has attributed to infidelity on his part. She was diagnosed with breast cancer in 1970, but recovered a few years later. Pinky was among the stars on hand to inaugurate Argentine color television broadcasting in 1978, but soon fell out of favor with the prevailing dictatorship after agreeing to interview Norma Aleandro, a renowned actress and dissident. This led her to turn to Argentina's vibrant theatre scene, where she accepted leading roles in local productions of Two Women, The Vagina Monologues and The Prisoner of Second Avenue, among others. Pinky produced a successful Buenos Aires presentation of Annie, as well. She hosted, along Juan Alberto Badía, the OTI Festival 1988.

== Political career ==
Her decision to co-host in 1982 Las 24 horas de las Malvinas, a television fundraiser devoted to the ongoing Falklands War, cost the hostess professional clout following the advent of democracy in 1983, whose victorious UCR she supported, ironically. Continuing to host a number of radio and television shows, she relocated to Azul, where she hosted the nationally broadcast La década del '80. Pinky became officially affiliated to the struggling, centrist Radical Civic Union following that party's 1995 election of Rodolfo Terragno as its president and, in 1999, she ran on the UCR-led Alliance for Mayor of La Matanza, the most populous district in the Province of Buenos Aires. Claiming victory after early returns on election night put her narrowly ahead, she was forced to concede defeat later in the evening after a complete tally gave the Justicialist (Peronist) Party candidate, Alberto Balestrini, a narrow edge.

Buenos Aires Mayor Enrique Olivera named her Secretary of Social Policy Promotion for the city in 2000, where she earned plaudits for her efforts against domestic violence. She returned to television to host Pinky y la conversación in 2001 and was awarded the prestigious Martín Fierro Award for Broadcasting Excellence in 2006. Having appeared for over 30,000 hours on Argentine television, she announced her intention to run for a seat in the Chamber of Deputies to represent the province where she was raised in and continued to live in. Running on the center-right Republican Proposal ticket founded by businessman (and later Buenos Aires Mayor) Mauricio Macri, Pinky was elected to Congress in October 2007. Her two sons, Leonardo and Gastón Satragno, formed Ultratango in 2003, a musical group performing in the Nuevo tango genre.

Following the 2009 mid-term elections, and at 74 years of age, Pinky became the dean of the Lower House of Congress, presiding over the 4 December session that elected the body's new leadership.

Satragno died on 8 December 2022, at the age of 87 in Buenos Aires.
