= KKNO =

Simulcasts WBOK, New Orleans, LA
- Gretna, Louisiana; United States
- Broadcast area: New Orleans area
- Frequency: 750 kHz

Programming
- Format: Brokered programming, local talk and gospel

Ownership
- Owner: Equity Broadcasting
- Sister stations: WBOK

History
- First air date: September 10, 1988
- Former call signs: KAIG (1987–1988)

Technical information
- Licensing authority: FCC
- Facility ID: 56784
- Class: D
- Power: 250 watts (days only)
- Transmitter coordinates: 29°53′15″N 90°5′3″W
- Translator: 107.1 K296HM (Gretna)

Links
- Public license information: Public file; LMS
- Webcast: Listen live
- Website: wbok1230.com

KKNO (750 AM) is a commercial radio station broadcasting a brokered talk and gospel format during the daytime hours. Licensed to Gretna, Louisiana, United States, the station serves the New Orleans metropolitan area. The station is currently owned by Robert C. Blakes Enterprises, Inc.

KKNO's transmitter is sited on Industry Street in Harvey, Louisiana.

== History ==
On September 10, 1988, the station signed on the air. As a construction permit, the unbuilt station was assigned the call letters KAIG on 1987-09-14. On 1988-12-12, the station changed its call sign to the current KKNO.

Former logo

In 1993, it was acquired by Robert C. Blake Enterprises for $275,000.

In 2025, it was acquired by Equity Broadcasting from Robert C. Blakes Enterprises for $200,000.
