= La Venganza Será Terrible =

La venganza será terrible (Revenge will be terrible) is a popular radio program in Argentina, also broadcast in Uruguay. It is hosted by Alejandro Dolina.

The program began on Radio El Mundo with the title "Demasiado tarde para lágrimas" ("Too late for tears"). It later moved to Radio Rivadavia under the same name, and then briefly to FM under the name "El Ombligo del Mundo" ("The Navel of the World"). It moved to Radio Continental until recently. On January 4, 2007, it moved to Radio 10. In 2010 the program moved to Radio Nacional. Internet broadcasts are available from Radio Nacional from Argentina, and Espectador, a Uruguayan radio station in Montevideo.

The show is free of charge and broadcasts Tuesdays to Saturdays from midnight to 2:00 AM, live from the auditorium of Radio Nacional. The show has three parts. In the first one, Dolina discusses a cultural subject (mostly European, Ancient Greek, or South American culture). The second part is humorous: Dolina usually goes through "lifestyle" magazines and, while reading the articles, he starts improvising stories that can go quite far from the original article. In the third part he sings songs that the audience asks for. Dolina is known for his vast knowledge of the tango music.
