= Víctor Hugo Morales =

Uruguayan journalist, pundit and writer (born 1947)

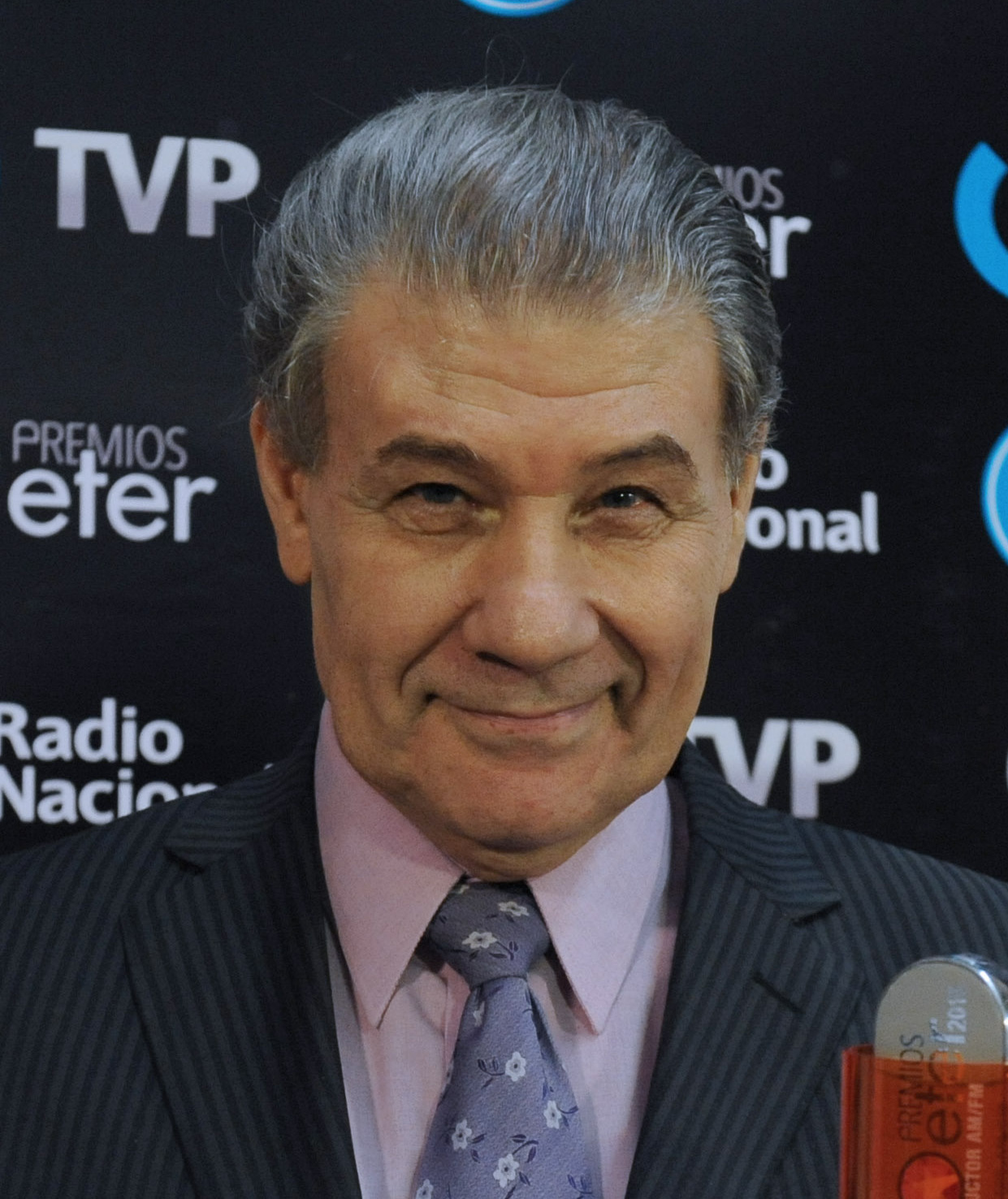
- Morales in 2015
- Born: Víctor Hugo Morales Pérez; 26 December 1947 (age 78); Cardona, Uruguay
- Occupations: Sports commentator, TV host, radio host, writer
- Notable work: Live commentary of the Goal of the Century
- Website: victorhugomorales.com.ar

Víctor Hugo Morales Pérez (born 26 December 1947) is a Uruguayan football journalist, pundit and writer who has lived and worked in Argentina since 1981.

== Biography ==
Morales was born in Cardona, Uruguay. His professional activity began in 1966 when, at the age of 19, he started to work as a reporter and announcer on Radio Colonia, Uruguay. In 1969 he was appointed head of sports at Radio Ariel.

The following year Morales was appointed sports director of Radio Oriental, where he worked until 1981, when he moved to live and work in Buenos Aires. He was also a sports journalist on the "Telenoche 4" program on Channel 4 of Montevideo.

As a football commentator, he has been regarded as one of the best in the Spanish-speaking world. In Argentina, his commentary on Diego Maradona's second goal in the 1986 World Cup quarter-final against England, famously known as the Goal of the Century, was widely praised.

He has been a staunch supporter of former President Cristina Fernández de Kirchner.

== Awards ==
Morales was awarded the 2011 Illustrious Citizen of the City of Buenos Aires Medal and the Rodolfo Walsh Prize.

== Selected works ==
- El intruso. Montevideo: Ediciones de la Plaza, 1979.
- Un grito en el desierto. Buenos Aires: Editorial Sudamericana, 1998.
- Papel Prensa, el grupo de tareas Medios, jueces y militares en la mayor estafa del pais Ediciones Colihue, 2017.
- La batalla cultural. Mentiras, infamias y omisiones del monopolio mediático Ediciones Colihue, 2020.
- El reproche. Drama, 2022.
