= Radiodifusión Argentina al Exterior =

International broadcasting service of Argentina

RAE Argentina al Mundo
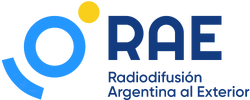
- Gral. Pacheco/Buenos Aires; Argentina
- Broadcast area: Worldwide
- Branding: "RAE"

Programming
- Affiliations: LRA Radio Nacional

Ownership
- Owner: Radio Nacional Argentina

History
- First air date: April 11, 1949

Links
- Webcast: Listen Live
- Website: radionacional.com.ar/rae

RAE Argentina al Mundo (English: RAE Argentina to the World), previously known as Radiodifusión Argentina al Exterior or RAE, is Argentina's state-owned international broadcaster, which uses shortwave, satellite and the Internet.

== History ==
RAE was founded on April 11, 1949, by then Argentine President, Juan Perón, as SIRA "Servicio Internacional de la República Argentina" (SIRA, International Service of the Republic of Argentina). SIRA broadcast 24 hours a day in seven languages.

After the military coup of September 1955, which removed Perón from power, SIRA was shut down by the new authorities. The station was relaunched as "Radiodifusión Argentina al Exterior'" ("Argentine Radio Broadcast Abroad"), on February 12, 1958. RAE is operated by LRA1 Radio Nacional, Argentina's state radio network.

The shortwave transmitter is located in General Pacheco, near the city of Buenos Aires; the station broadcasts its programs from the studios of LRA Radio Nacional in Buenos Aires.

In September 2016, RAE changed its name from Radiodifusión Argentina al Exterior to RAE Argentina al Mundo.

== Present ==
The programs that RAE broadcasts focus on Argentine news, culture, geography, history, and music, among other subjects. Music on RAE varies from Argentine folkloric (usually gaucho and indigenous fare) and tango music, to Argentine pop music.

The station broadcasts in seven languages: Spanish, German, French, English, Italian, Portuguese, Chinese and Japanese. RAE used to broadcast in Arabic, until Arabic programming was cancelled by station management some time ago; one of RAE's opening jingles still has an Arabic introduction.

RAE also broadcasts programs from its principal channel, Radio Nacional, so that Argentines abroad can get in touch with current events from their homeland. Among the programs broadcast from Radio Nacional are news program "Panorama Nacional de Noticias", and professional football matches from Argentina's professional leagues.
