= LOR Radio Argentina =

First national radio station in Argentina

Created by Enrique Telémaco Susini, LOR Radio Argentina was the first national broadcast radio station in Argentina. It operated continuously from 1920 to 1997.

== First broadcast ==
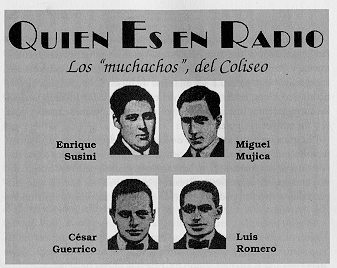
The four Locos de la Azotea

After returning to Argentina from Europe in 1919, the radio pioneer Enrique Telémaco Susini started working on the conversion of an old circus site into the Teatro Coliseo theater. Together with his friends Miguel Mugica, Cesar Guerrico and Luis Romero Carranza, he started planning for a radio transmission from there, strongly supported by the two Italian owners, Faustino da Rossa and Walter Mocchi.

During 1920, while the group was working on the project, news reached them of Marconi's successful broadcast of a concert in New York City that had taken place on May 19. Even though it was somewhat of a disappointment that their broadcast would not be the world's first, the preparations continued at a rapid pace.

On August 27, they were finally ready. The theatre was showing the opera Parsifal by Richard Wagner. Susini and his coworkers had set up a 5W transmitter on the roof using a RS-5 Telefunken tube, operating in 350m, along with a wire antenna connected to the dome on top of a neighboring building. To pick up the sound in the theater, they used a microphone originally designed to aid people with hearing loss.

Around 8:30 pm, Susini himself took the microphone and inaugurated regular radio broadcast service in Argentina with the words:

Señoras y señores, la Sociedad Radio Argentina les presenta hoy el Festival Sacro de Ricardo Wagner, Parsifal, con la actuación del tenor Maestri...

(Ladies and gentlemen, the Radio Argentina Society today presents you the [opera] Parsifal by Richard Wagner, featuring the tenor Maestri...)

The transmission continued for about three hours and was received as far as Santos in Brazil, where it was picked up by a ship's radio operator. The number of listeners was limited, since the crystal set radios used at the time were rare and difficult to operate, requiring tedious fine-tuning of a lead glass crystal and installation of a wire antenna several meters long. But the newspaper La Razón published a raving review, and even president Hipólito Yrigoyen commended Susini and his group for their accomplishment.

== Radio Argentina ==
During the next 19 days, the group continued to broadcast from the theater, transmitting mostly Italian operas such as Verdi's Aida and Rigoletto. After the season at the Teatro Coliseo was over, they started creating productions under their own name. By now they officially called their station "Radio Argentina". Radio Argentina would continue broadcasting until its demise on December 31, 1997.

At first, it was run solely by the four friends. The polyglot Susini himself performed songs in Spanish, French, German, Italian and Russian, assuming a different stage name each time so the listeners would not notice.

During the following years, radio broadcasting in Argentina saw a quick expansion. In 1921, Buenos Aires mayor Juan Barnetche introduced official broadcasting licenses. In the same year, Radio Club Argentina was founded, becoming the first such association on American soil. In October 1922, Radio Argentina broadcast live from the inauguration of president Marcelo Torcuato de Alvear, an historic first. Two months later, the first competitors arrived - Italian-owned Corporación Argentina de Radio Sud América, Radio Brusa and Radio Cultura, all three founded within an interval of three days.

In 1924, the radio industry in Argentina went through a brief crisis, during which Radio Argentina had to be financially supported by an association of industrialists named Asociación Argentina de Broadcasting. While competitor Radio Sud América went into bankruptcy, and was taken over by Radio Argentina, Radio Argentina itself survived, even though it had to briefly adopt the name of its benefactors. The station now broadcast from the famous Teatro Colón opera as well as from the (Tango-) Club Abdullah, and other venues. Adding to the variety of the schedule was Argentina's first regular radio journal.

1925 saw the introduction of mandatory callsigns for radio stations, and from now on the station was known as LOR Radio Argentina (changed 1934 into LR2 Radio Argentina, it being the second station on the dial from the left). It also entered a collaboration with the daily newspaper Crítica, remaining under the direction of Susini and his friends but adopting the name "LOR Broadcasting de Crítica". This arrangement lasted a little more than a year, before the station returned to its original name and ownership.

The station closed on January 1, 1997, after a religious show. This was due to economic problems caused by a bad administration.
