= Alejandro Dolina =

Argentine broadcaster

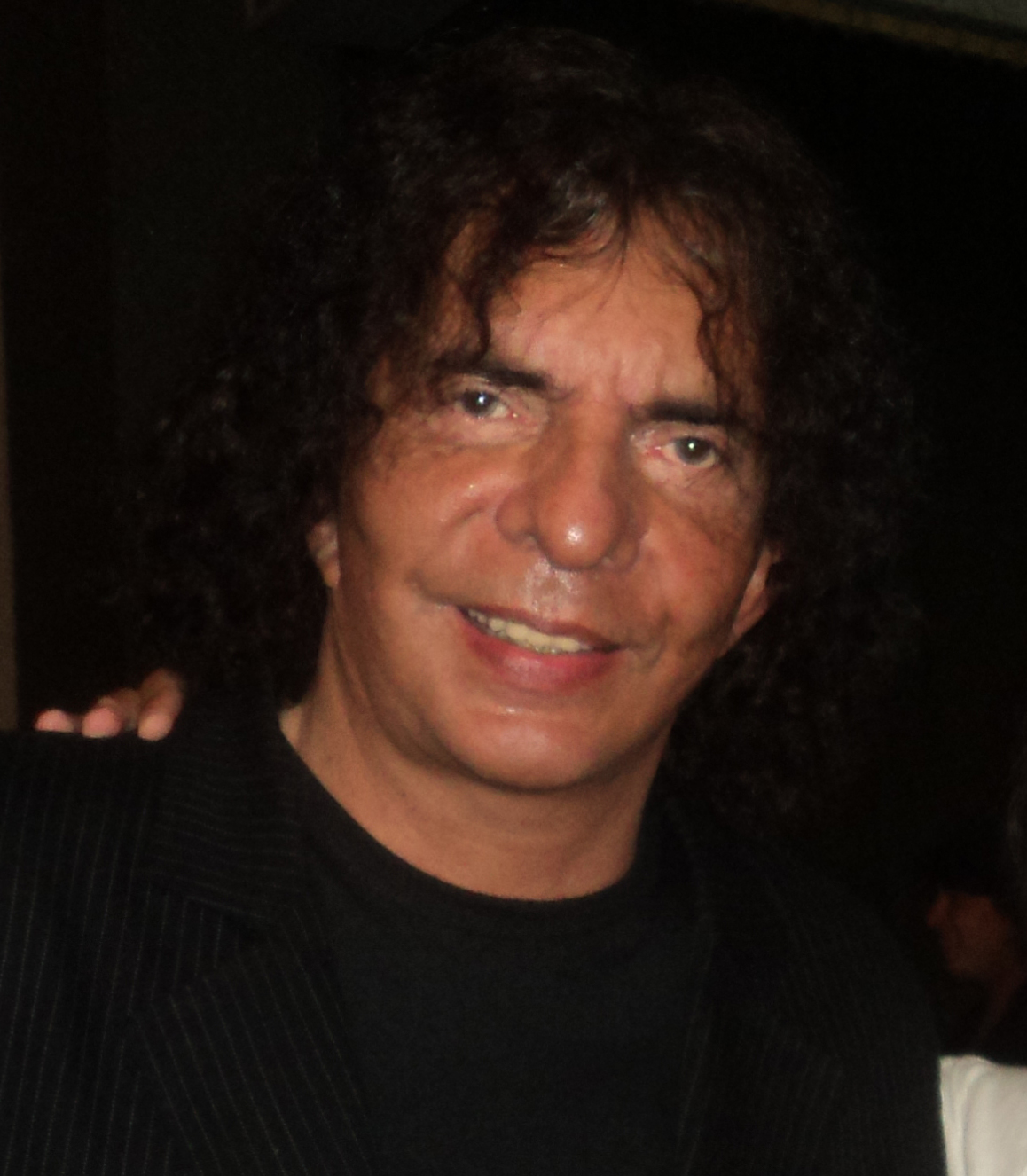
- Dolina in 2012
- Born: Alejandro Ricardo Dolina; May 20, 1944 (age 81) Buenos Aires Province, Argentina
- Occupation: Writer, musician, poet, broadcaster
- Language: Spanish

Alejandro Ricardo Dolina Colombo (born May 20, 1944) is an Argentine broadcaster, who also achieved fame as a musician, writer, radio host and television actor. He studied Law, Music, Literature and History. He is most famous for his classic radio show La venganza será terrible, which is the most tuned radio program of late nights in Argentina.

== Works ==
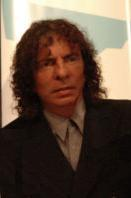
Alejandro Dolina in 2006, at Casa Rosada.

=== Novels ===
- Crónicas del Ángel Gris (Ediciones de la Urraca, 1988), illustrations of Nine.
- Crónicas del Ángel Gris. Edición corregida y aumentada (Colihue, 1996), illustrations of Hermenegildo Sábat.
- El libro del fantasma (Colihue, 1999), illustrations of Nine.
- Bar del Infierno (Planeta, 2005)
- Cartas marcadas (Editorial Planeta, 2012)
- Notas al pie (Editorial Planeta, 2021)

=== Musicals ===
- Lo que me costó el amor de Laura. Opereta Criolla - Operetta (Colihue, 1998).
- Radiocine (Planeta, 2002).

=== Music ===
- Tangos del Bar del infierno (2004)

=== Theater ===
- El barrio del Ángel Gris (1990)
- Teatro de Medianoche (1991)
- Bar del Infierno (2004)

=== Radio ===
- Mañanitas nocturnas (1972)
- Demasiado tarde para lágrimas (1985–1991)
- El ombligo del mundo (1992)
- La venganza será terrible (1993–Present)

=== TV ===
- Rêves, bifteck et démocratie, Allons tous à Viedma, Tout est mort, je le sais, documentaries, dir. Françoise Prébois, France 3 (1986)
- La barra de Dolina (1990)
- Fuga de cerebros (1991)
- El ombligo del mundo (1992)
- Bar del Infierno (2003)
- Recordando el show de Alejandro Molina (2011)

=== Film (as actor) ===
- Las puertitas del señor López (1988) (as God)
- El día que Maradona conoció a Gardel (1996)
- Noah's Ark (2007) (voice only)
