= Radio Rivadavia =

Radio station in Buenos Aires, Argentina

Radio Rivadavia (LS5)
- Argentina
- Broadcast area: Buenos Aires
- Frequency: 630 (KHz)

Programming
- Language: Spanish
- Format: Full service

Ownership
- Owner: Radiodifusora Cultural S.A.

History
- First air date: 1928

Technical information
- Licensing authority: ENACOM
- Class: B
- ERP: 25 Kw (day); 5 Kw (night)

Links
- Webcast: Listen Live
- Website: https://www.rivadavia.com.ar/

LS5 Radio Rivadavia is a radio station which broadcasts from Buenos Aires, Argentina. Founded in 1928, it broadcasts 24 hours a day since 1959, and carries a full service format. Its slogan is Todo lo que pasa, todo el día (Spanish for "Everything that’s happening, all day long").
