= LRA Radio Nacional =

Argentine national public radio station

- Type: Radio network
- Country: Argentina
- Availability: Nationwide
- Owner: Government of Argentina
- Launch date: 1937
- Official website: radionacional.com.ar

LRA Radio Nacional, also known as Radio Nacional Argentina, is the Argentine national radio station, and part of the national public media system. It started transmitting in 1937 as LRA Radio del Estado and changed its name to the current one in 1957. Since 1949, National Radio is also in charge of the Radiodifusión Argentina al Exterior, an international service that broadcasts in numerous languages.

The radio's programs focus on Argentine news, and culture, and history, among other things. Music broadcast includes all kind of Argentine songs - from Folklore to Tango and Argentine Rock. Aside from the main news broadcasts and cultural shows, RNA also broadcasts national football matches and the performance of other Argentine athletes during venues such as the Olympic Games or the FIFA World Cup.

== Availability ==
The head of the radio system is located in Buenos Aires, and has several transmission points that re-transmit the original signal, but also produce their own programs:

- LRA1 Radio Nacional de Buenos Aires
- LRA2 Viedma, Río Negro Province
- LRA3 Santa Rosa, La Pampa Province
- LRA4 Salta, Salta Province
- LRA5 Rosario, Santa Fe Province
- LRA6 Mendoza, Mendoza Province
- LRA7 Córdoba, Córdoba Province
- LRA8 Formosa Formosa Province
- LRA9 Esquel, Chubut Province
- LRA10 Ushuaia, Tierra del Fuego Province
- LRA11 Comodoro Rivadavia, Chubut Province
- LRA12 Santo Tomé, Corrientes Province
- LRA13 Bahía Blanca, Buenos Aires Province
- LRA14 Santa Fe, Santa Fe Province
- LRA15 Tucumán, Tucumán Province
- LRA16 La Quiaca, Jujuy Province
- LRA17 Zapala, Neuquén Province
- LRA18 Río Turbio, Córdoba Province
- LRA19 Puerto Iguazú, Misiones Province
- LRA20 Las Lomitas, Jujuy Province
- LRA21 Santiago del Estero, Santiago del Estero Province
- LRA22 Jujuy, Jujuy Province
- LRA23 San Juan, San Juan Province
- LRA24 Río Grande Tierra del Fuego Province
- LRA25 Tartagal, Salta Province
- LRA26 Resistencia, Chaco Province
- LRA27 Catamarca Catamarca Province
- LRA28 La Rioja La Rioja Province
- LRA29 San Luis San Luis Province
- LRA30 Bariloche, Río Negro Province
- LRA31 Radio RAE de Buenos Aires
- LRA36 Arcángel San Gabriel - Esperanza Base, Argentine Antarctica
- LRA42 Gualeguaychú, Entre Ríos Province
- LRA51 Jachal, San Juan Province
- LRA52 Chos Malal, Neuquén Province
- LRA53 San Martín de los Andes, Neuquén Province
- LRA54 Ingeniero Jacobacci, Río Negro Province
- LRA55 Alto Río Senguer, Chubut Province
- LRA56 Perito Moreno, Santa Cruz Province
- LRA57 El Bolsón, Río Negro Province
- LRA58 Río Mayo, Chubut Province
- LRA59 Gobernador Gregores, Santa Cruz Province
- LRA343 Neuquén, Neuquén Province
- LRA339 FM Folklórica de Buenos Aires
- LT11 Concepción del Uruguay, Entre Ríos Province
- LT12 Paso de los Libres, Corrientes Province
- LT14 Paraná, Entre Ríos Province
- LU4 Comodoro Rivadavia, Chubut Province
- LU23 El Calafate, Santa Cruz Province
- LV4 San Rafael, Mendoza Province
- LV8 Mendoza, Mendoza Province
- LV19 Malargüe, Mendoza Province
