= WAZA (FM) =

- Liberty, Mississippi; United States
- Broadcast area: South-Central Mississippi
- Frequency: 107.7 MHz
- Branding: 107.7 WAZA

Programming
- Format: Urban adult contemporary
- Affiliations: Westwood One

Ownership
- Owner: North Shore Broadcasting Co., Inc.
- Sister stations: WAKK, WKJN, WAPF

History
- First air date: 1998

Technical information
- Licensing authority: FCC
- Facility ID: 82529
- Class: C3
- ERP: 25,000 watts
- HAAT: 100 meters (330 ft)
- Transmitter coordinates: 31°17′12.0″N 90°47′53.0″W

Links
- Public license information: Public file; LMS

WAZA (107.7 FM) is an American radio station licensed to serve the community of Liberty, Mississippi. The station is owned and operated by North Shore Broadcasting Co., Inc.

== Programming ==
WAZA was launched as an urban outlet branded as "The Spot 107.7" in 1998. Throughout its early years it also had other formats including Variety Hits and Oldies. In mid-2010, the station flipped to sports talk as a Fox Sports Radio affiliate branded as "Sportstalk 107.7FM". Since April 2011, the station has broadcast an urban adult contemporary music format branded as "The Touch 107.7" and serves the McComb, MS area. 107.7 WAZA is known for the Blues Cruise with DJ Lonnie MC, which airs weekdays from 3-7pm and Saturdays 10am-1pm. In 2023, it became the home for The Steve Harvey Morning Show.

== History ==
WAZA was also the call letters of an AM station in the 1970s in Bainbridge, Georgia.

After applying in July 1996, this station received its original construction permit from the Federal Communications Commission on January 22, 1998. The new station was assigned the WAZA call sign by the FCC on February 20, 1998. WAZA received its license to cover from the FCC on September 25, 1998.

On September 21, 2011, Charles W. Dowdy, acting as the sole owner of license holder Southwest Broadcasting, Inc., dissolved the corporation and assigned the broadcast licenses it held (WAZA plus sister stations WAKH, WAKK, WAPF, WFCG, WJSH, WKJN, and WTGG) to himself acting as debtor in possession before initiating a Chapter 11 bankruptcy. The FCC approved the license transfer on December 19, 2011.

On October 25, 2019, the stations emerged and this signal was transferred to North Shore Broadcasting.
