= WAKH =

Radio station in McComb, Mississippi

- McComb, Mississippi; United States
- Frequency: 105.7 MHz
- Branding: K106

Programming
- Format: Country music

Ownership
- Owner: North Shore Broadcasting Co., Inc.

History
- Former call signs: WIXO-FM (1979–1979); WIXO (1979–1981)

Technical information
- Licensing authority: FCC
- Facility ID: 58935
- Class: C1
- ERP: 100,000 watts
- HAAT: 149 meters (489 ft)
- Transmitter coordinates: 31°16′50″N 90°27′05″W

Links
- Public license information: Public file; LMS
- Webcast: Listen Live
- Website: K106 Country Website

WAKH (105.7 FM) is a radio station broadcasting a country music format, licensed to McComb, Mississippi, United States. The station is owned by North Shore Broadcasting Co., Inc. and features programming from Citadel Media. The transmitter is located in Summit, Mississippi.

== History ==
The station was assigned call sign WIXO-FM on February 15, 1979. On May 4, 1979, the station changed its call sign to WIXO then again on September 8, 1981, to the current WAKH.,

On September 21, 2011, Charles W. Dowdy, acting as the sole owner of license holder Southwest Broadcasting, Inc., dissolved the corporation and assigned the broadcast licenses it held (WAKH plus sister stations WAKK, WAPF, WAZA, WFCG, WJSH, WKJN, and WTGG) to himself acting as debtor in possession before initiating a Chapter 11 bankruptcy. The FCC approved the license transfer on December 19, 2011.

On October 25, 2019, the stations emerged and this signal was transferred to North Shore Broadcasting.
