= WAKK =

WAKK may refer to:

- WAKK (AM), a defunct radio station (980 AM) formerly licensed to serve McComb, Mississippi, United States
- WKJN, a radio station (104.9 FM) licensed to serve Centreville, Mississippi, United States, which held the call sign WAKK-FM from October 2005 to April 2009
- the ICAO code for Mopah Airport
