= WTGG =

Coordinates: 30°37′24″N 90°24′19″W

- Amite, Louisiana; United States
- Broadcast area: Hammond, Louisiana
- Frequency: 96.5 MHz
- Branding: Tangi 96.5

Programming
- Format: Oldies

Ownership
- Owner: North Shore Broadcasting Co., Inc.
- Sister stations: WFPR, WHMD, WJSH, WYLK

History
- First air date: 1997

Technical information
- Licensing authority: FCC
- Facility ID: 41571
- Class: A
- ERP: 6,000 watts
- HAAT: 100 meters (330 ft)

Links
- Public license information: Public file; LMS
- Webcast: Listen Live
- Website: tangiradio.net

WTGG (96.5 FM is a radio station airing an Oldies format, licensed to Amite, Louisiana. The station serves the Hammond, Louisiana, area.

On September 21, 2011, Charles W. Dowdy, acting as the sole owner of license holder Southwest Broadcasting, Inc., dissolved the corporation and assigned the broadcast licenses it held (WTGG plus sister stations WAKH, WAKK, WAPF, WAZA, WFCG, WJSH, and WKJN) to himself acting as debtor in possession before initiating a Chapter 11 bankruptcy. The FCC approved the license transfer on December 19, 2011.

On October 25, 2019, the stations emerged and this signal was transferred to North Shore Broadcasting.
