= WAPF =

- McComb, Mississippi; United States
- Broadcast area: McComb, Mississippi; Pike County, Mississippi
- Frequency: 1140 kHz

Programming
- Format: Sports

Ownership
- Owner: North Shore Broadcasting Co., Inc.
- Sister stations: WAKK, WKJN, WAZA

History
- First air date: 1975

Technical information
- Licensing authority: FCC
- Facility ID: 58934
- Class: D
- Power: 1,000 watts (day only)
- Transmitter coordinates: 31°14′51.0″N 90°25′14.0″W

Links
- Public license information: Public file; LMS

WAPF (1140 AM) is a sports formatted broadcast radio station licensed to McComb, Mississippi, serving McComb and Pike County, Mississippi.

On September 21, 2011, Charles W. Dowdy, acting as the sole owner of license holder Southwest Broadcasting, Inc., dissolved the corporation and assigned the broadcast licenses it held (WAPF plus sister stations WAKH, WAKK, WAZA, WFCG, WJSH, WKJN, and WTGG) to himself acting as debtor in possession before initiating a Chapter 11 bankruptcy. The FCC approved the license transfer on December 19, 2011.

On October 25, 2019, the stations emerged and this signal was transferred to North Shore Broadcasting Co., Inc.
