= WFPR =

- Hammond, Louisiana; United States
- Broadcast area: Tangipahoa Parish, Louisiana; Greater New Orleans
- Frequency: 1400 kHz
- Branding: The Boss Country

Programming
- Format: Classic country

Ownership
- Owner: Northshore Media Group; (North Shore Broadcasting Co., Inc.)
- Sister stations: WHMD, WJSH, WTGG, WYLK

History
- First air date: November 15, 1947

Technical information
- Licensing authority: FCC
- Facility ID: 679
- Class: D
- Power: 1,000 watts
- Transmitter coordinates: 30°30′31.0″N 90°30′18.0″W

Links
- Public license information: Public file; LMS
- Website: northshoremedia.net/northshore-media-group-stations

WFPR is a Classic country formatted radio station. The station is licensed to Hammond, Louisiana and serves Tangipahoa Parish, and Greater New Orleans in Louisiana. WFPR is owned by Northshore Media Group and operated under their North Shore Broadcasting Co., Inc. licensee.

== Translator ==
In addition to WFPR's primary frequency, the station's programming is simulcast on the following translator station, on the FM band, to widen WFPR's broadcast area.

| Call sign | Frequency | City of license | FID | ERP (W) | HAAT | Class | Transmitter coordinates | FCC info |
|---|---|---|---|---|---|---|---|---|
| W279DB | 103.7 FM | Hammond, Louisiana | 152562 | 250 watts | 111 m (364 ft) | D | 30°30′32.0″N 90°30′19.0″W | LMS |
