= WKJN =

- Centreville, Mississippi; United States
- Broadcast area: Wilkinson County, Mississippi; Amite County, Mississippi; East Feliciana Parish, Louisiana
- Frequency: 104.9 MHz

Programming
- Format: Classic Country

Ownership
- Owner: North Shore Broadcasting Co., Inc.
- Sister stations: WAKK, WAPF, WAZA

History
- First air date: 1979
- Former call signs: WZZB (?-1986); WZFL-FM (1986–2005); WAKK-FM (2005–2009)

Technical information
- Licensing authority: FCC
- Facility ID: 53025
- Class: A
- ERP: 3,000 watts
- HAAT: 91 Meters
- Transmitter coordinates: 31°6′7.0″N 91°2′27.0″W

Links
- Public license information: Public file; LMS

WKJN is a classic country formatted broadcast radio station licensed to Centreville, Mississippi, serving Wilkinson and Amite counties in Mississippi and East Feliciana Parish in Louisiana. The station is owned by North Shore Broadcasting Co., Inc. The format is known as "The Highway 104.9".

On September 21, 2011, Charles W. Dowdy, acting as the sole owner of license holder Southwest Broadcasting, Inc., dissolved the corporation and assigned the broadcast licenses it held (WKJN plus sister stations WAKH, WAKK, WAPF, WFCG, WJSH, WAZA, and WTGG) to himself acting as debtor in possession before initiating a Chapter 11 bankruptcy. The FCC approved the license transfer on December 19, 2011.

On October 25, 2019, the station's license was transferred to North Shore Broadcasting Co., Inc.
