= Hobet Coal Mine =

Defunct American coal mine in West Virginia

Coordinates: 38°5′N 81°59′W

The Hobet 21 Coal Mine in West Virginia was operational between 1974 and 2015. Straddling the border of Boone County and Lincoln County in the Appalachian Mountains, the Hobet 21 mine was one of the largest mountaintop-removal coal mining operations in West Virginia. Originally owned by Jacob Carrico, the mine used both underground mining and strip mining techniques, and later even more intensive surface mining using a dragline. Increasing productivity and profitability encouraged workers to successfully strike for their health plan in 1993, which resulted in unusually thorough coverage for mine workers at this time. The Hobet mine was incorporated into Arch Coal in 1997, along with several other mines, following booming coal demand. The mine was sold two more times: to Magnum Coal in 2005 and to Patriot Coal in 2008. Patriot Coal subsequently went bankrupt in 2015, and the Hobet site was passed into a Virginia-based conservation firm who continued to mine the land while reclaiming and planting trees to offset carbon emissions for other companies.

The Hobet 21 Coal Mine site is currently defunct and in 2016, former West Virginia Governor Earl Ray Tomblin proposed developing the environmentally degraded former coal field. This residential, industrial and commercial development plan is intended to offset the economic impacts from the declining coal industry, but has been called "a long way from reality".

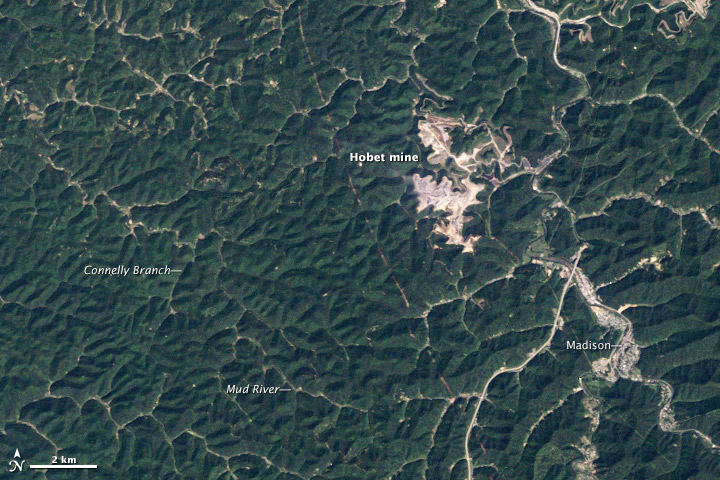
Hobet Coal Mine in September 1984.

== History ==
=== General history ===
Coal mining has been a primary industry of West Virginia since coal was first discovered in Boone County in 1742, by John Peter Salley. The Hobet 21 mine itself was not opened until 1974. The mine was a small, family business under its original owners, Fil Nutter and Granville Lee Linville. It was subsequently sold off four times, to Ashland Oil (1977), Arch Coal (1997), Magnum Coal (2005), and Patriot Coal (2008). Under the ownership of Ashland Oil, a new, more intensive form of mining using a dragline was introduced, which commenced operation in 1983 and doubled production. A highly successful business enterprise, Hobet coal reached its peak value in the early 2010s.

In 2014 the Virginia Conservation Legacy Fund reclaimed what was left of Patriot Coal. VCLF's ERP Compliant Fuels was granted rights for 150 mining permits across Appalachia in exchange for assuming responsibility of the $400 million worth of miner health care liabilities that Patriot Coal was previously responsible for.

=== Union ===
Hobet miners were involved in the United Mine Workers' (UMW) selective strike in 1993, which included workers from five states. At the time, just 30% of mining was union protected, and miners struggled to maintain their power. Hobet's union ultimately accepted lower wages in exchange for an "exceptional" health plan. Another major UMW protest took place in 2015, at the Patriot Coal headquarters. Workers objected to the bankrupted Patriot's intentions to sell its assets to Blackhawk Mining, canceling contracts, benefits, and retiree pensions in the process. Patriot Coal claimed the miners would probably have job opportunities at Blackhawk, or with the conservation group, Virginia Conservation Legacy Fund, that is planning to restore former Hobet mine lands—but that was not guaranteed.

=== Environmental justice activism ===
The Last Mountain, a 2011 documentary about a neighboring Boone County coal mine, brought the broader area's struggle for environmental justice into the limelight. In 2012, a grassroots activist group called Radical Action for Mountain People's Survival (RAMPS), organized a protest in which some 50 people shut down the Hobet mine, resulting in 20 arrests. The protesters stood up against the environmental degradation taking place through mountaintop removal mining techniques, and were especially angry about effects on the health of nearby human populations. These low-income populations have been inundated with poisonous carcinogenic water and air pollution from the mine. A 2016 study found that populations in greater proximity to both present and past coal mining sites in Appalachia have greater exposure to environmental hazards. Because these areas are primarily low income, this is a form of environmental inequality.

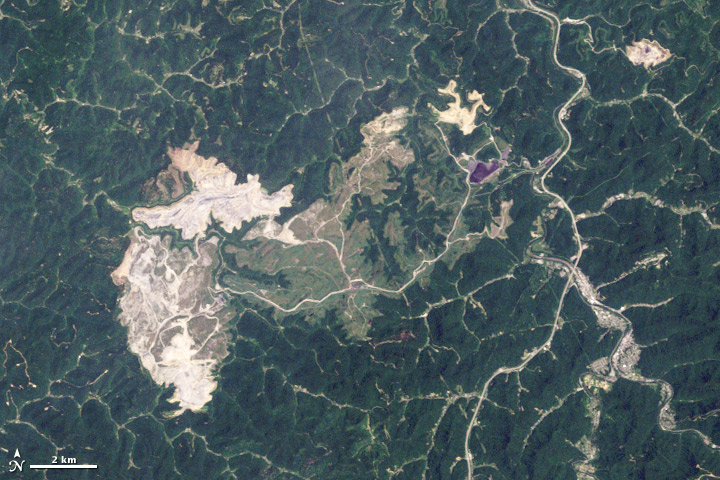
Hobet Coal Mine in June 2009.

== Economics ==
=== Output and employment ===
In 1975, the Hobet mine produced less than 90,000 tons of coal. This number significantly increased to almost 500,000 tons three years later. At its peak in 2002, the mine produced 5 million tons of coal. Alongside the output of the mine, the number of employees increased as well. Employing less than 50 workers at its inception, the mine employed more than 200 by 1982. However, in 1993, in order to secure their health benefits, the workers went on strike from May to December. Both output and the number of workers plummeted, but they were restored in 1994 after the strike ended.

=== Bankruptcy ===
With an increase in the availability of natural gas (due to hydraulic fracturing technologies), as well a rising use of renewable energy sources, world demand for coal is decreasing. From 2007 to 2016, U.S. fossil fuel consumption decreased by nearly one-third. In recent years, bankruptcy has become epidemic among United States coal companies. Patriot Coal, the owner of the mine at the time, announced its bankruptcy in 2012, resulting in the loss of health benefits for the miners. The company cited competition from natural gas, a weak economy, and regulations as the main factors of their bankruptcy. Patriot obtained bankruptcy financing and advice in order to survive. In August 2015, Patriot filed Chapter 11 with the Bankruptcy Court. In October 2015, a Virginia bankruptcy court approved the bankruptcy. The assets and liabilities previously owned by Patriot Coal were taken on by ERP Compliant Fuels, a subsidiary of the Virginia Conservation Legacy Fund.

=== Income demographics ===
The communities surrounding the mine are primarily low-income areas. Boone County has a poverty rate of 23%, and a per-capita income of $21,387. Lincoln County's poverty rate is higher, at 28%, with a per-capita income of $19,114. This is compared to the national average poverty rate of 14%, and the national per-capita income of $29,979. Only 8.8% of Boone County residents and 10% of Lincoln County residents have a post-secondary education. In 2014 (before Patriot Coal went bankrupt) the mining industry made up 23% of industry in Boone County, and was the largest sector in the county.

== Environmental and health impacts ==
=== Environmental impacts ===
Mountaintop removal causes multiple environmental problems including deforestation, decapitated peaks, significant carbon dioxide emissions, contamination of the air with sulfur, and biodiversity loss; but one of the most significant is the damage caused to waterways that support mountain ecosystems. Coal companies clear-cut the ecologically diverse forest and then use dynamite to remove mountaintops and pile the waste rock into mountain valleys, creating dams called valley fills. In particular, the Connelly Branch of the Mud River was nearly completely filled in. The Hobet mine has been operating in the Mud River watershed since the 1970s, and has been more destructive to the surrounding ecosystems than any other mine in Appalachia. More than 20 of these valley fills containing high levels of conductivity pollution—in conjunction with deforested mountainsides— contribute to significant toxic runoff, which contaminates the Mud River and its numerous tributaries many miles downstream from the mine site. Even though the mine is now closed, piles of spoil and valley fills are leaching a large quantity of selenium into the surrounding watershed. Nonetheless, in 2010, the EPA reported that the mine had satisfied the requirements given in the Clean Water Act.

The Obama-era Stream Protection Rule requires that landscapes affected by coal mining be restored to a condition in which it is capable of supporting the same ecosystem components and uses that the undisturbed land had previously supported. However, this rule was repealed in 2017, leaving restoration up to private interests. Government agency reclamation guidelines require former mine sites to be restored to the "approximate original contour" of the site, and replanted with biologically diverse fauna that provides comparable ecosystem services to those of the original landscape. Many companies interpret these guidelines as a call simply to bulldoze earth into place and reseed grass. Numerous reclaimed sites are now pastureland, and reforestation is rare due to this liberal interpretation of the law, as well as the fact that true ecological reclamation is very expensive. Much of the reclamation process that is done by mining companies uses crushed rock, and because this does not absorb as much water as the topsoil that once covered the land, the flow of water runoff has increased during storms, washing away vegetation and soil. This is detrimental to the carbon and nitrogen cycles, impairing ecosystem function.

The EPA lists 110 separate organic pollutants and 14 metals/minerals as "priority pollutants" in relation to strip mining practices. Some of the pollutants on the list include: lead, mercury, arsenic, selenium, haloethers, nitrophenols, polychlorinated biphenyls, chlorobenzene, phthalate esters, nitrosamines, polynuclear aromatic hydrocarbons.

=== Human health impacts ===
In communities surrounding mountaintop removal sites, pollutants often leach into the groundwater. This groundwater contamination causes health concerns. There is a link to higher rates of disease near large-scale mining sites like Hobet mine, such as cancer and birth defects, decreased birth weight, diminished educational attainment, cardiac and pulmonary disease, and significantly decreased life expectancy.

The now-defunct mine site contains rubble and retaining ponds are leaching selenium. In 2016, Reuter reported:

"On the land where the dragline first trod, there’s a slurry impoundment rather than the wildlife habitat promised by executives in the original permit."

While the communities surrounding coal mines are in danger from environmental pollution-related diseases and infrastructure failures such as the Elk River chemical spill of 2014, mine workers themselves also contend with elevated risks of physical injury, hearing loss, and black lung disease.

== Future developments ==
In 2016, then West Virginia Governor Earl Ray Tomblin proposed the development of a $140 million industrial site on the Hobet 21 site. The mountaintop removal site was selected for development for its close proximity to a four-lane highway and its relatively large size, which the governor's office cited as being important for the economic development of the area. Current Governor Jim Justice has stated that he supports going through the plan to develop the site. The proposed development plan has been controversial among environmentalist groups, as scientists have claimed that long-term pollution from the former coal operation will cause water quality problems for the users of the proposed development.

In 2015 the Sierra Club, the Ohio Valley Environmental Coalition, and West Virginia Highlands Conservancy filed a lawsuit against Patriot Coal Corporation, accusing the company of releasing pollutants into water systems in the surrounding area, in particular into the Mud River, which these groups claim has become "biologically impaired" by the Hobet 21 coal mining site. In 2016 a settlement was reached between the Sierra Club, the Ohio Valley Environmental Coalition, the West Virginia Highlands Conservancy, and the Virginia Conservation Legacy Fund (VCLF), which reclaimed the remains of Patriot Coal in the wake of Patriot Coal's 2015 bankruptcy. The settlement established a $6 million stream restoration and reforestation project that VCLF was made responsible for carrying out. VCLF assumed Patriot Coal's $400 million worth in worker's compensation liabilities and environmental restoration responsibilities in exchange for multiple mining complexes in West Virginia and several mining permits. Additionally, VCLF was granted a 3 1/2-year extension on the previously existing deadline to treat selenium water pollution, which was the subject of the 2015 lawsuit brought up against Patriot Coal. It was also agreed that the 2015 Clean Water Act conductivity pollution enforcement case was to be postponed as part of the settlement. Despite this, development of the Hobet site is being carried out. In 2016, The West Virginia Department of Transportation requested approval for the design and development of a 2.6-mile access road to the site. Construction is expected to begin in March 2017.

Tomblin named the project Rock Creek Development Park, and announced that the West Virginia National Guard will contribute to it. The Guard is expected to use the property to maintain national vehicles, train, and invest in agricultural needs such as planting apple trees and constructing greenhouses.

In 2022, a 250 MW solar farm is planned for the area.

== See also ==
- Environmental justice and coal mining in Appalachia
- Social and economic stratification in Appalachia
