= WAKK (AM) =

McComb, Mississippi; United States
- Broadcast area: South-Central Mississippi
- Frequency: 980 kHz

Programming
- Format: Defunct (formerly Gospel)

Ownership
- Owner: Charles W. Dowdy
- Sister stations: WKJN, WAPF, WAZA

History
- First air date: 1948
- Former call signs: WAPF (1948–2005)

Technical information
- Facility ID: 58930
- Class: D
- Power: 5,000 watts (day); 152 watts (night)
- Transmitter coordinates: 31°12′51.0″N 90°27′42.0″W

WAKK was a gospel formatted broadcast radio station licensed to McComb, Mississippi, serving South-Central Mississippi.

On September 21, 2011, Charles W. Dowdy, acting as the sole owner of license holder Southwest Broadcasting, Inc., dissolved the corporation and assigned the broadcast licenses it held (WAKK plus sister stations WAKH, WAZA, WAPF, WFCG, WJSH, WKJN, and WTGG) to himself acting as debtor in possession before initiating a Chapter 11 bankruptcy. The Federal Communications Commission (FCC) approved the license transfer on December 19, 2011.

WAKK's license was surrendered on May 4, 2016, and cancelled by the FCC that same day.
