= WHMD =

- Hammond, Louisiana; United States
- Frequency: 107.1 MHz
- Branding: Kajun 107.1

Programming
- Format: Country

Ownership
- Owner: Northshore Broadcasting
- Sister stations: WFPR, WJSH, WTGG, WYLK

History
- First air date: 1974
- Call sign meaning: Hammond

Technical information
- Licensing authority: FCC
- Facility ID: 680
- Class: A
- ERP: 6,000 watts
- HAAT: 100 meters (330 ft)
- Transmitter coordinates: 30°25′32.00″N 90°17′01.00″W

Links
- Public license information: Public file; LMS
- Webcast: Listen live
- Website: kajun107.net

WHMD (107.1 FM) is an American radio station broadcasting a country music format. Licensed to Hammond, Louisiana, United States, the station serves Tangipahoa Parish and surrounding areas. The station is currently owned by North Shore Broadcasting Co., Inc.

== History ==
The station was originally an adult contemporary station aimed at Hammond with the name "Star 107.1" . The station changed format some time during its former ownership by Guaranty Broadcasting to its current country music format. It assumed the slogan of former Hammond country station WKJN which was flipped by its owners to ultimately another format under the current callsign of WRQQ
