= Patriot Coal =

Coal-mining company based in St. Louis, Missouri

Patriot Coal Corporation
- Type: Defunct
- Industry: Mining
- Founded: October 31, 2007
- Headquarters: St. Louis, Missouri, USA
- Key people: Bennett K. Hatfield Pres, CEO, Dir.
- Products: Coal
- Number of employees: 3,500 (2010)
- Subsidiaries: Magnum Coal
- Website: patriotcoal.com

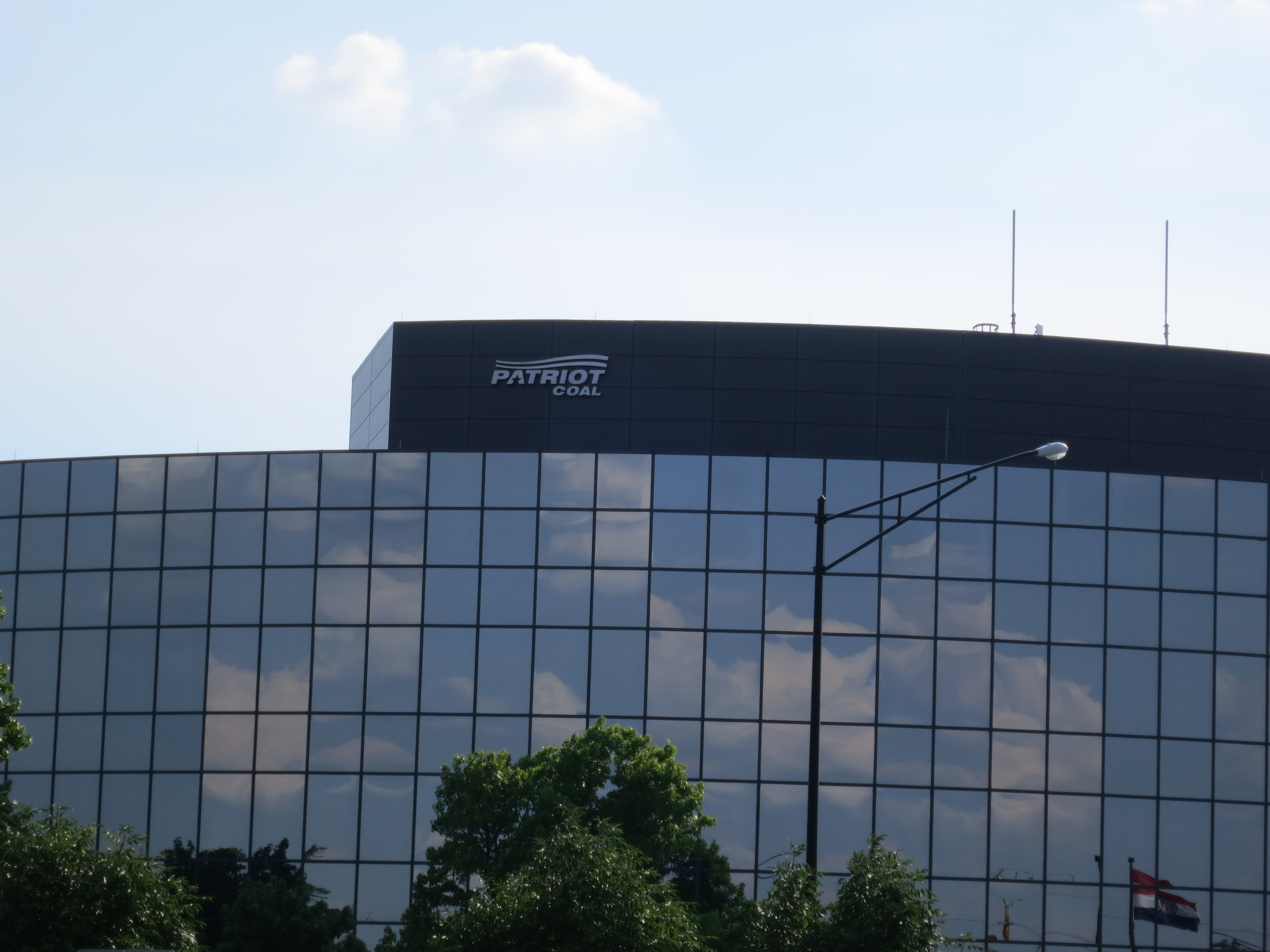
Patriot Coal building in Creve Coeur, Missouri in June 2013

Patriot Coal Corporation was a coal-mining company based in St. Louis, Missouri in the United States. The company was a spin-off of most of the Eastern U.S. operations of Peabody Energy.

Patriot was the second-largest coal miner east of the Mississippi River. The company's operations were made up of 16 mining complexes. Thirteen of these complexes were located in West Virginia and three were located in Kentucky. In 2007, Patriot sold 22.1 million tons of coal. The company controlled 1.9 billion tons of proven and probable coal reserves. Patriot was the largest producer of thermal coal in the Eastern United States. It was also a leading producer of metallurgical coal. Approximately 80% of its coal was sold to domestic utilities and 20% was sold to domestic and international steel producers.

Patriot Coal's stock started trading on the New York Stock Exchange under the symbol PCX on November 1, 2007.

On July 23, 2008, Patriot acquired Magnum Coal Company. At the time, Magnum was one of the largest coal producers in Appalachia, with 11 mines and 7 processing plants. Magnum had over 600 million tons of proven or probable coal reserves.

On June 1 and 14, 2012, solely for the purpose of establishing venue in the Southern District of New York, Patriot incorporated two subsidiaries in New York, according to counsel for the United Mine Workers. On July 9, 2012, Patriot Coal Corporation and all of but two of its wholly owned subsidiaries filed voluntary petitions for reorganization under Chapter 11 of the Bankruptcy Code in the Bankruptcy Court for the Southern District of New York. None of its joint ventures are party to the bankruptcy proceeding, however. Patriot management advised its shareholders that it intends to use the reorganization process to address its financial challenges and make the company stronger and more competitive. The stock listed on the NYSE (New York Stock Exchange) under the symbol PCX dropped 72.1% to a record low on July 9, 2012.

Also on July 9, 2012, the company issued a letter to all retired workers that their medical programs are still in place and payments will be made as usual. The company has, however, made it clear that it intends to seek to reduce or eliminate its benefit obligations through the bankruptcy process, which it estimates to have a total present value of $1.3 Billion. The United Mine Workers of America, which represents Patriot's classified workers and retirees, has indicated that it will fight to preserve those promised benefits.

On July 10, 2012, the company received interim bankruptcy court approval of a debtor-in-possession loan facility, giving Patriot access to $677 million in financing.

Having restructured, the company exited Chapter 11 on December 18, 2013, as a privately owned company.

In Patriot Coal's Brody Mine No. 1 in West Virginia two of its workers died in a ground failure. The owners were in the process of disputing numerous safety violations at the mine which the federal Mine Safety and Health Administration had categorized as a pattern violator.

in February 2014, over 100,000 gallons of coal slurry spilled from a Patriot Coal facility into Fields Creek, a tributary of the Kanawha River.

On May 12, 2015, Patriot Coal Corporation and its wholly owned subsidiaries filed voluntary petitions for restructuring under Chapter 11.

In October 2015, Lexington, KY-based Blackhawk Mining, LLC, purchased most of the assets of Patriot Coal out of bankruptcy. The value of the transaction was approximately $1 billion.

The company has announced it will no longer provide health coverage to its retirees after 31 December 2016.

== Operations ==
On November 15, 2012, the company signed an agreement with the Sierra Club to end the practice of mountaintop removal, a destructive form of mining.
