= Surface mining =

Type of mining in which the soil/rock above mineral deposits is removed

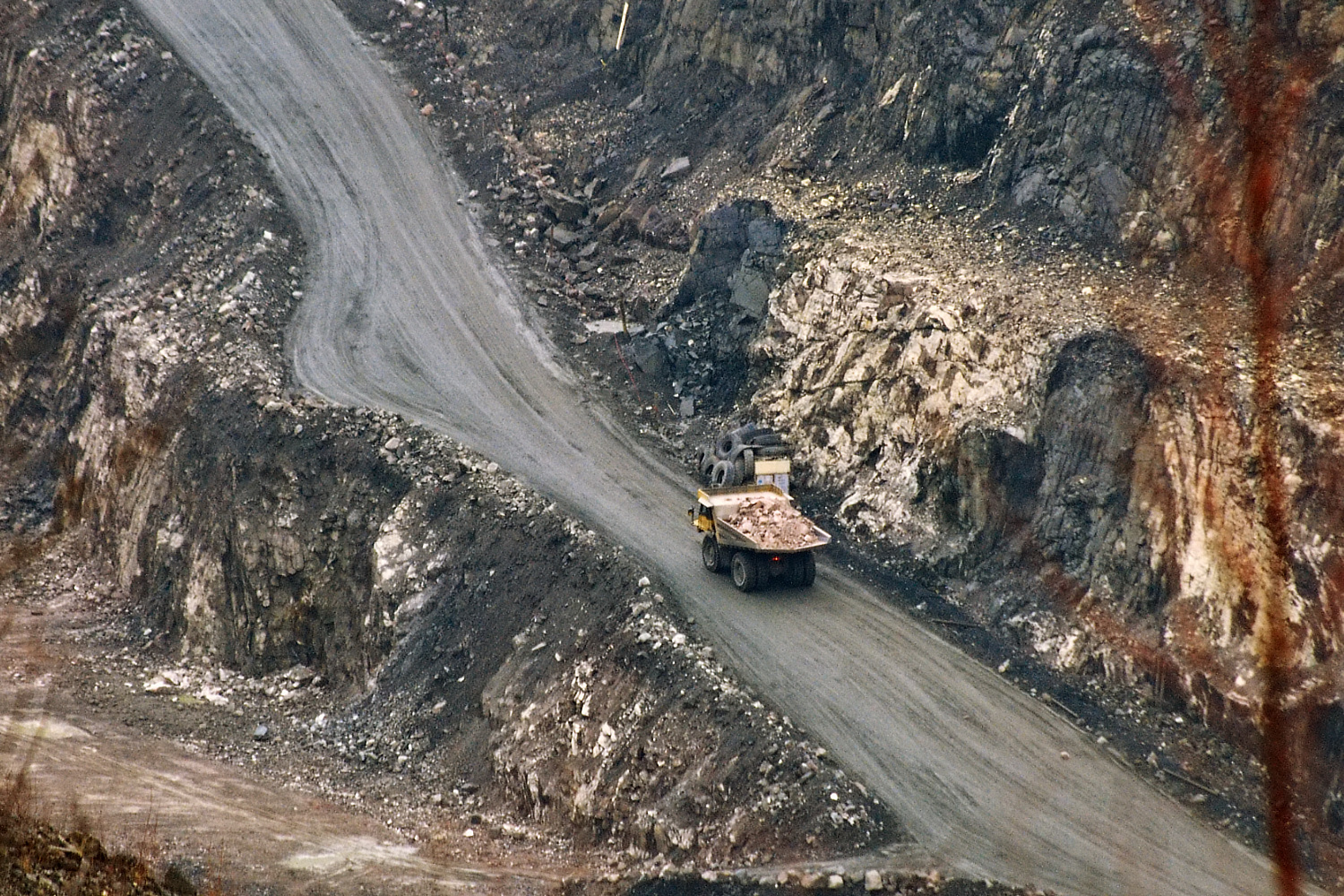
The Siilinjärvi carbonatite complex, an open-pit mine owned by Yara International, in Siilinjärvi, Finland

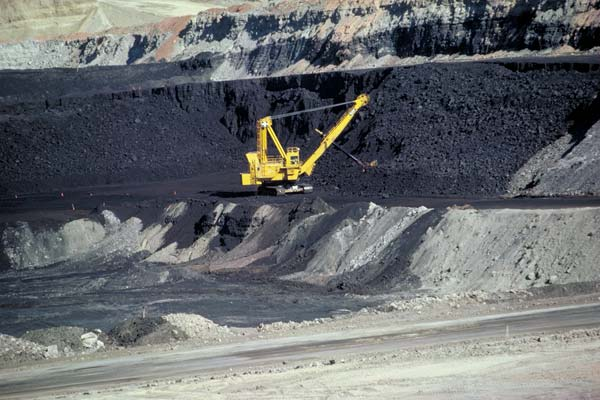
Coal strip mine in Wyoming

Surface mining, including strip mining, open-pit mining and mountaintop removal mining, is a broad category of mining in which soil and rock overlying the mineral deposit (the overburden) are removed, in contrast to underground mining, in which the overlying rock is left in place, and the mineral is removed through shafts or tunnels.

In North America, where the majority of surface coal mining occurs, this method began to be used in the mid-16th century and is practiced throughout the world in the mining of many different minerals. In North America, surface mining gained popularity throughout the 20th century, and surface mines now produce most of the coal mined in the United States.

In most forms of surface mining, heavy equipment, such as earthmovers, first remove the overburden. Next, large machines, such as dragline excavators or bucket-wheel excavators, extract the mineral.

Advantages of surface mining include lower cost and greater safety compared to underground mining. Disadvantages include hazards to human health and the environment. Humans face a variety of health risks caused by mining such as different cardiovascular diseases, food, and water contamination. Habitat destruction, alongside air, noise, and water pollution, are all significant negative environmental impacts caused by the side effects of surface mining.

== Types ==
There are five main types of surface mining as detailed below.

=== Strip mining ===
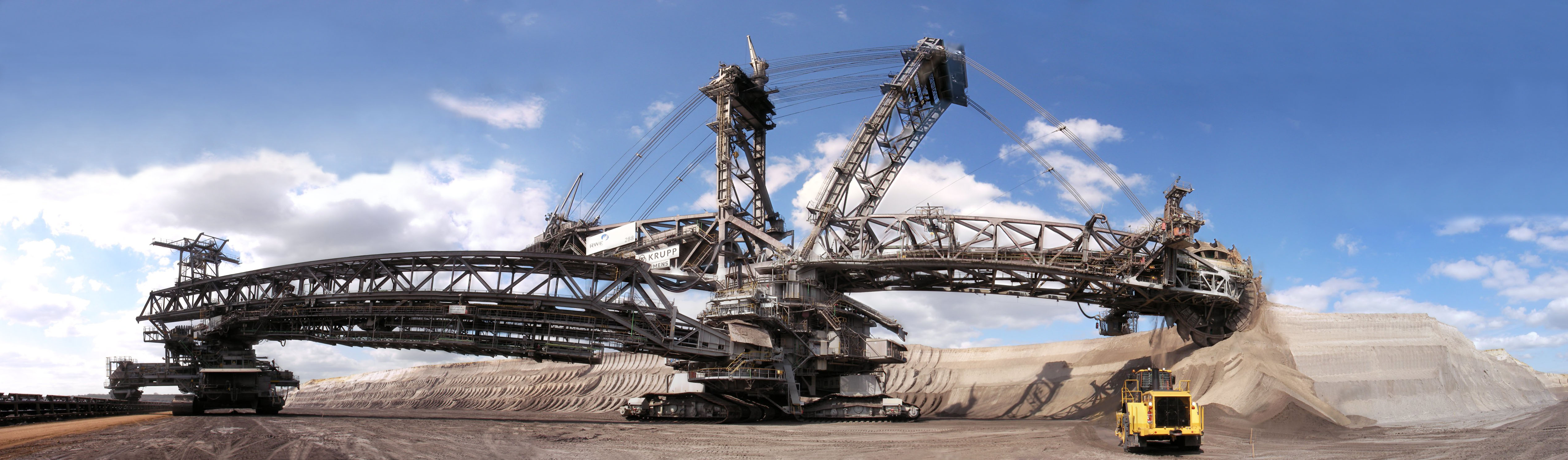
The Bagger 288 is a bucket-wheel excavator used in strip mining.

Strip mining is the practice of mining a seam of mineral, by first removing a long strip of overlying soil and rock (the overburden); this activity is also referred to as overburden removal. It is most commonly used to mine coal and lignite (brown coal). Strip mining is only practical when the ore body to be excavated is relatively near the surface and/or is mostly horizontal. This type of mining uses some of the largest machines on earth, including bucket-wheel excavators which can move as much as 12,000 cubic meters (16,000 cu. yd.) of earth per hour.

There are two forms of strip mining. The more common method is area stripping, which is used on fairly flat terrain, to extract deposits over a large area. As each long strip is excavated, the overburden is placed in the excavation produced by the previous strip.

Contour mining involves removing the overburden above the mineral seam near an outcrop in hilly terrain, where the mineral outcrop usually follows the contour of the land. Contour stripping is often followed by auger mining into the hillside, to remove more of the mineral. This method commonly leaves behind terraces in mountainsides.

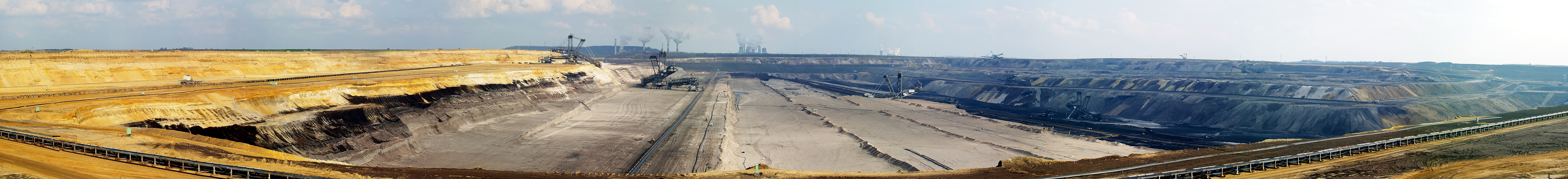
Strip mining at Garzweiler surface mine in Germany. The lignite being extracted is at left, the removed overburden being placed at right. Note that it is a largely flat mine for a horizontal mineral.

=== Open-pit mining ===
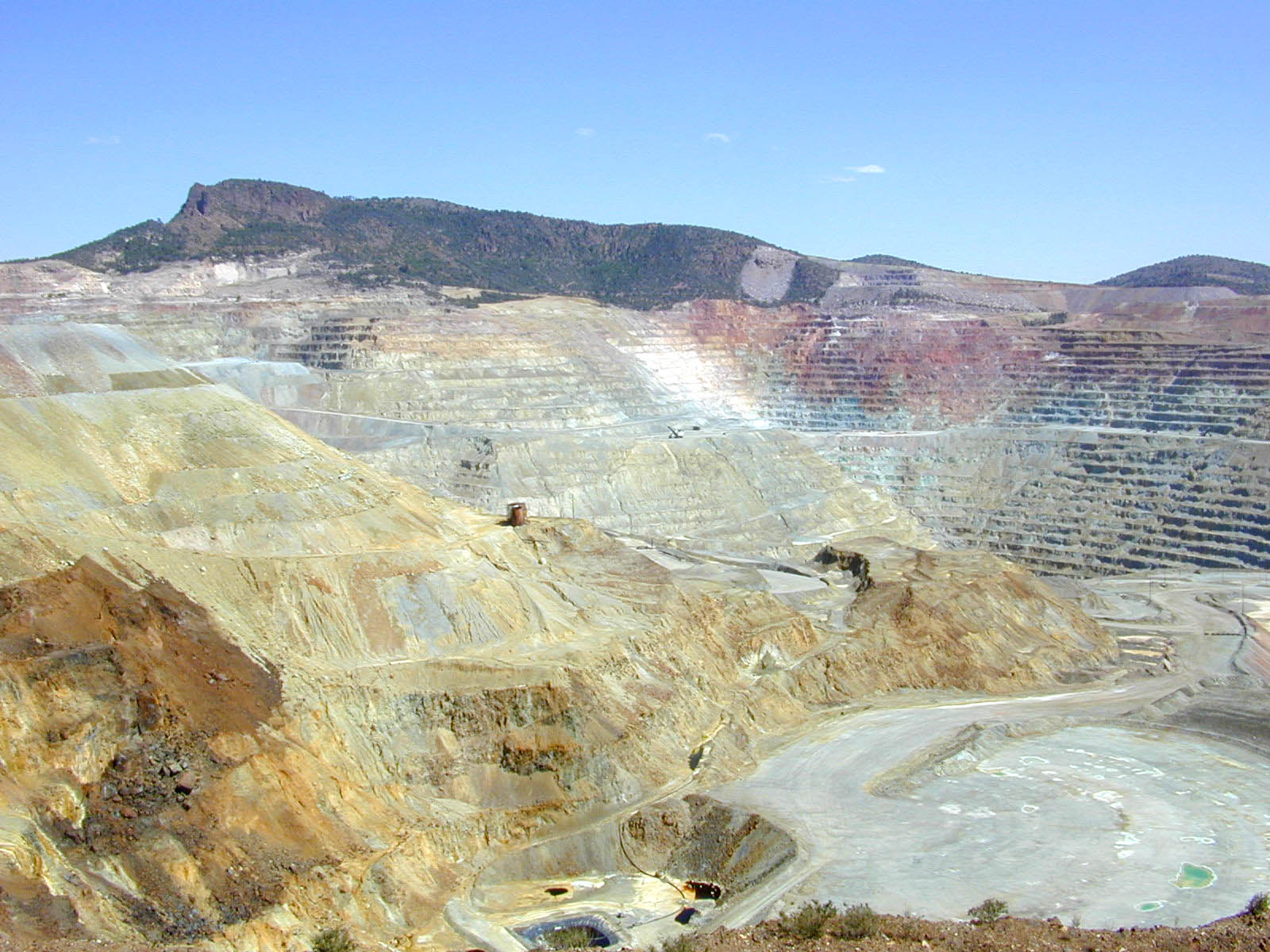
The El Chino mine located near Silver City, New Mexico is an open-pit copper mine.

Open-pit mining refers to a method of extracting rock or minerals from the earth through their removal from an open pit or borrow. This process is done on the ground surface of the earth. It is best suited for accessing mostly vertical deposits of minerals. Although open-pit mining is sometimes mistakenly referred to as "strip mining", the two methods are different (see above).

=== Mountaintop removal ===
Mountaintop removal mining (MTR) is a form of coal mining that mines coal seams beneath mountaintops by first removing the mountaintop overlying the coal seam. Explosives are used to break up the overburden (rock layers above the seam), which is then removed. The overburden is then dumped by haul trucks into fills in nearby hollows or valleys. MTR involves the mass restructuring of earth in order to reach coal seams as deep as 400 feet (120 m) below the surface. Mountaintop removal replaces the original steep landscape with a much flatter topography. Economic development attempts on reclaimed mine sites include prisons such the Big Sandy Federal Penitentiary in Martin County, Kentucky, small-town airports, golf courses such as Twisted Gun in Mingo County, West Virginia and Stonecrest Golf Course in Floyd County, Kentucky, as well as industrial scrubber sludge disposal sites, solid waste landfills, trailer parks, explosive manufacturers, and storage rental lockers.

This method has been increasingly used in recent years in the Appalachian coal fields of West Virginia, Kentucky, Virginia, and Tennessee in the United States. The profound changes in topography and disturbance of pre-existing ecosystems have made mountaintop removal highly controversial.

Proponents of mountaintop removal point out that once the areas are reclaimed as mandated by law, the technique provides premium flat land suitable for many uses in a region where flat land is rare. They also maintain that the new growth on reclaimed mountaintop mined areas is better able to support populations of game animals.

Critics contend that mountaintop removal is a disastrous practice that benefits a small number of corporations at the expense of local communities and the environment. A U.S. Environmental Protection Agency (EPA) environmental impact statement finds that streams near valley fills sometimes may contain higher levels of minerals in the water and decreased aquatic biodiversity. The statement also estimates that 724 miles (1,165 km) of Appalachian streams were buried by valley fills from 1985 to 2001.

Blasting at a mountaintop removal mine expels dust and fly-rock into the air, which can then disturb or settle onto private property nearby. This dust may contain sulfur compounds, which some claim corrode structures and tombstones and is a health hazard.

Although MTR sites are required to be reclaimed after mining is complete, reclamation has traditionally focused on stabilizing rock and controlling erosion, but not always on reforesting the area. Quick-growing, non-native grasses, planted to quickly provide vegetation on a site, compete with tree seedlings, and trees have difficulty establishing root systems in compacted backfill. Consequently, biodiversity suffers in a region of the United States with numerous endemic species. Erosion also increases, which can intensify flooding. In the eastern United States, the Appalachian Regional Reforestation Initiative works to promote the use of trees in mining reclamation.

=== Dredging ===
Dredging is a method for mining below the water table. It is mostly associated with gold mining. Small dredges often use suction to bring the mined material up from the bottom of a water body. Historical large-scale dredging operations often used a floating dredge; a barge-like vessel that scoops material up through a conveyor belt on the bow, filters out the desired component on board, and returns the unwanted material to the water via another conveyor belt on the stern. In gravel-filled river valleys with shallow water tables, a floating dredge can work its way through the loose sediment in a pond of its own making.

=== Highwall mining ===
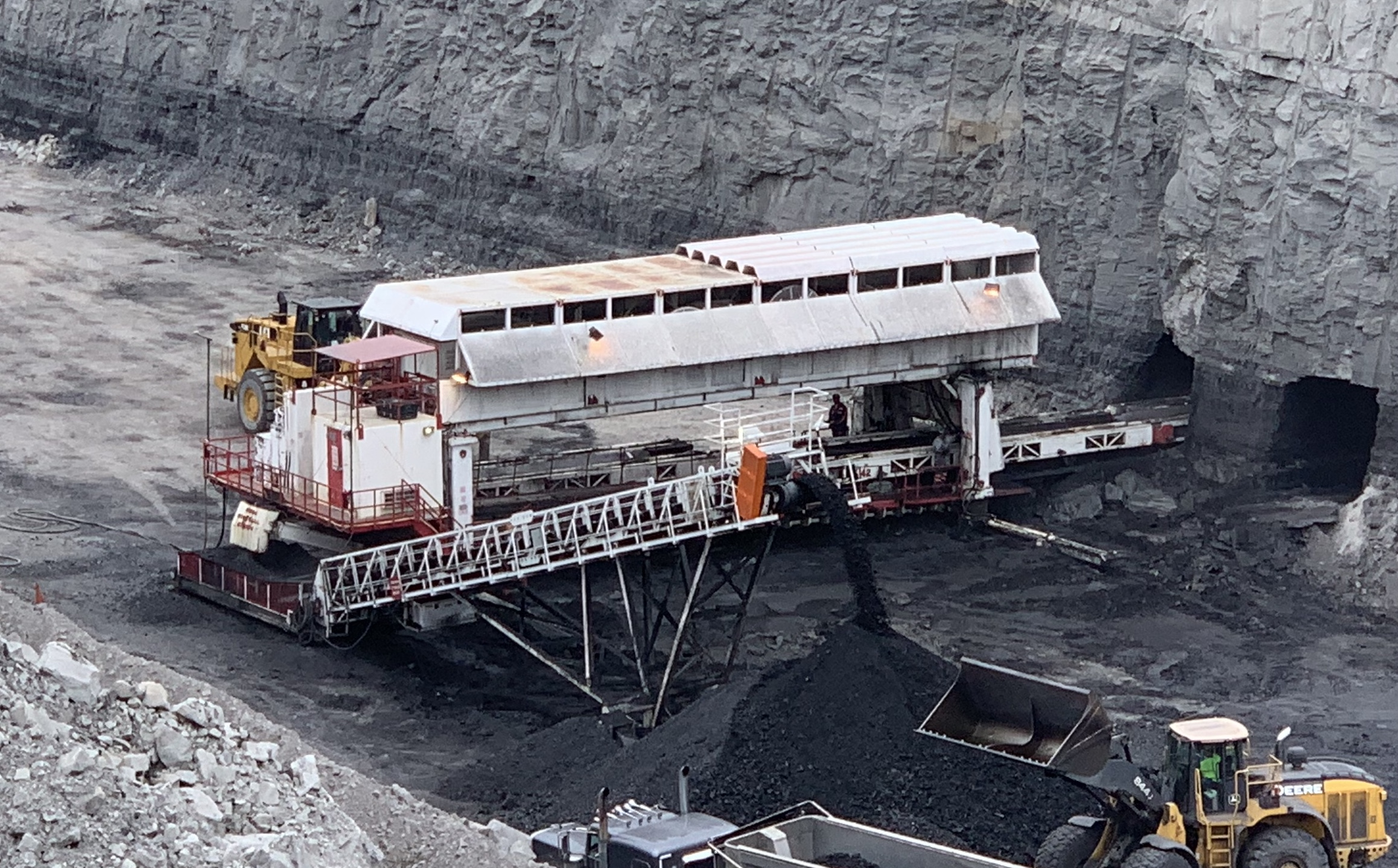
Highwall mining

Highwall mining is another form of mining sometimes conducted to recover additional coal adjacent to a surface-mined area. The method evolved from auger mining but does not meet the definition of surface mining since it does not involve the removal of overburden to expose the coal seam. CERB final report No. 2014-004 "Highwall Mining: Design Methodology, Safety, and Suitability" by Yi Luo characterizes it as a "relatively new semi-surface and semi-underground coal mining method that evolved from auger mining". In highwall mining, the coal seam is penetrated by a continuous miner propelled by a hydraulic pushbeam transfer mechanism (PTM). A typical cycle includes sumping (launch-pushing forward) and shearing (raising and lowering the cutterhead boom to cut the entire height of the coal seam). As the coal recovery cycle continues, the cutterhead is progressively launched into the coal seam for 19.72 feet (6.01 m). Then, the PTM automatically inserts a 19.72-foot-long (6.01 m) rectangular pushbeam (screw-conveyor segment) into the center section of the machine between the Powerhead and the cutterhead. The pushbeam system can penetrate nearly 1,200 feet (370 m) (proven in 2015 till today) into the coal seam. One patented highwall mining system uses augers enclosed inside the pushbeam that prevent the mined coal from being contaminated by rock debris during the conveyance process. Using a video imaging and/or a gamma-ray sensor and/or other geo-radar systems like a coal-rock interface detection sensor (CID), the operator can see ahead projection of the seam-rock interface and guide the continuous miner's progress. Highwall mining can produce thousands of tons of coal in contour-strip operations with narrow benches, previously mined areas, trench mine applications, and steep-dip seams by utilizing a controlled water-inflow pump system and/or a gas (inert) venting system.

Recovery with tunneling shape of drives used by highwall miners is much better than round augering holes, but the mapping of areas that have been developed by a highwall miner are not mapped as rigorously as deep mined areas. Very little soil is displaced in contrast with mountaintop removal; however, it is comparatively more expensive to own and operate a highwall miner.

Mapping of the outcrop, as well as core hole data and samples taken during the bench-making process, are taken into account to best project the panels that the highwall miner will cut. Obstacles that could be potentially damaged by subsidence and the natural contour of the highwall mine are taken into account, and a surveyor points the highwall miner in a line (theoretical survey plot-line) mostly perpendicular to the highwall. parallel lines represent the drive cut into the mountain (up to 1,200 feet (370 m) deep (2015 records), without heading or corrective steering actuation on a navigation azimuth during mining results in missing a portion of the coal seam and is a potential danger of cutting in pillars from previous mined drives due to horizontal drift (roll) of the pushbeam-cuttermodule string. Recently highwall miners have penetrated more than 1,200 feet (370 m) (2015 ongoing records into the coal seam, and today's models are capable of going farther, with the support of gyro navigation and not limited anymore by the amount of cable stored on the machine. The maximum depth would be determined by the stress of further penetration and associated specific-power draw (torsion and tension in screw transporters string), but today's optimized screw-transporters conveying embodiments (called pushbeams) with visual product development and discrete element modeling (DEM) using flow simulation behavior software shows smart-drive extended penetrations are possible, even so under steep inclined angles from horizontal to more than 30 degree downhole. In case of significant steep mining the new mining method phrase should be "directional mining" (commonly used technologies as valuable synergy directional drilling and directional mining are categorized in "surface to in-seam" (SIS) techniques), dry or wet, dewatering is developed or cutting and dredging through screw transporters are proactive in developing a roadmap of the leading global highwall mining engineering company.

== Transport ==
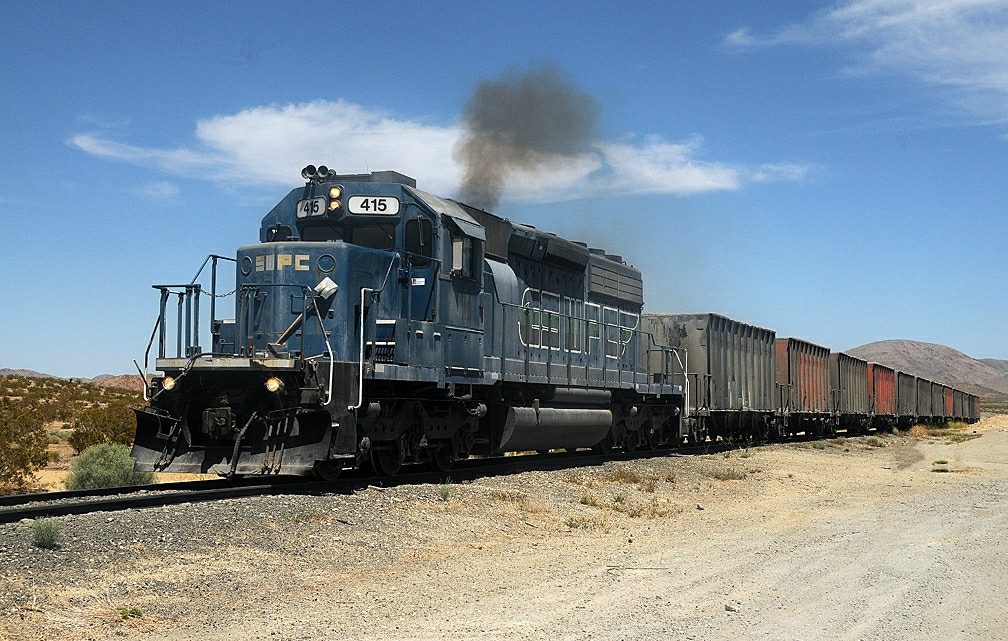
Mojave Northern Railroad limestone train

Historically, moving materials out of surface mines was accomplished through manual labor, horse-drawn vehicles, and/or mining railways.

Current practices tend to use haul trucks on haul roads designed into the features of the mine.

== Environmental and health issues ==
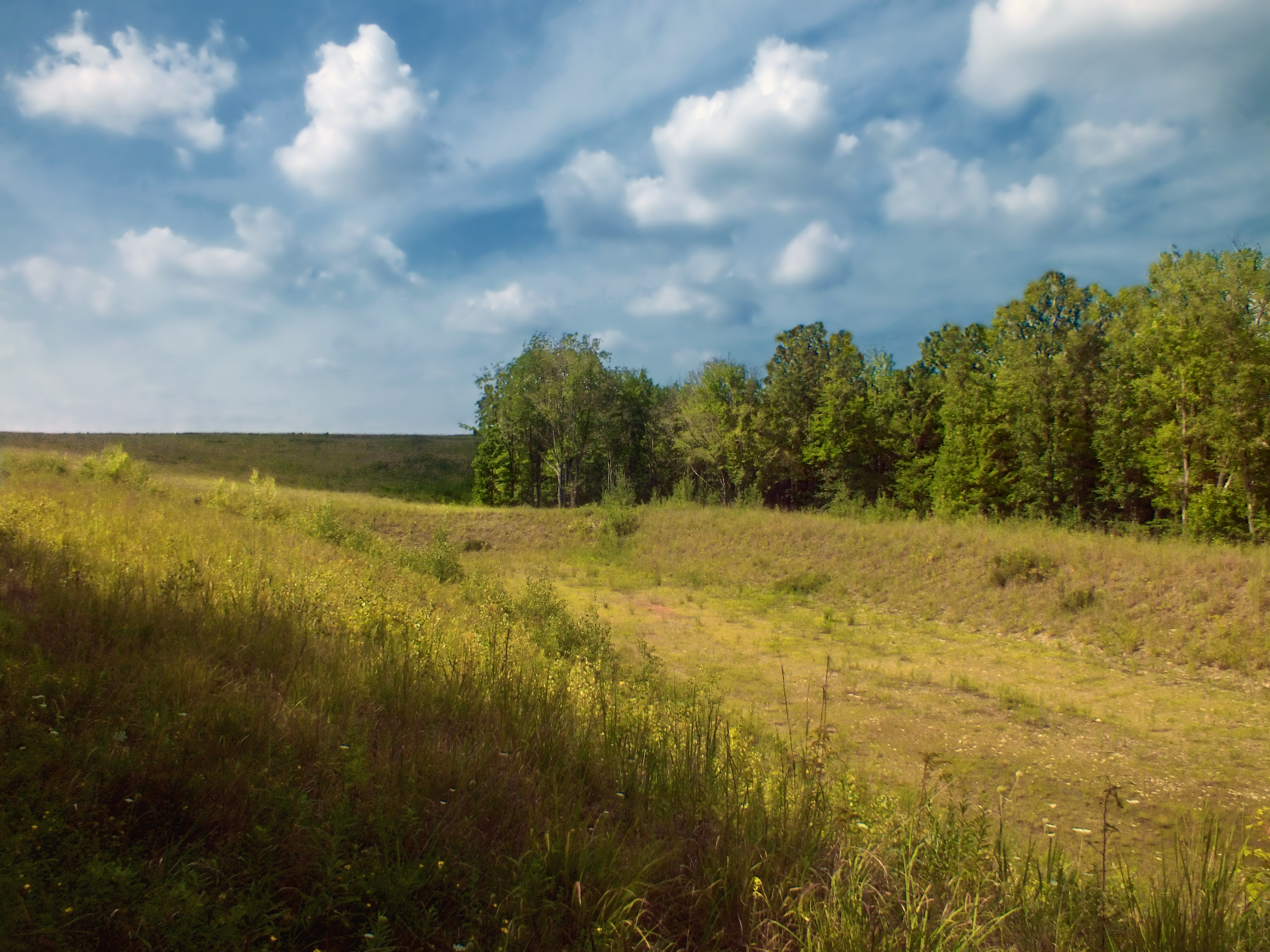
Reclaimed strip mine in Centre County, Pennsylvania

=== Regulation ===
Federal governments have imposed multiple laws and regulations which mining companies have to strictly follow. In the United States, the Surface Mining Control and Reclamation Act of 1977 mandates reclamation of surface coal mines. Reclamation for non-coal mines is regulated by state and local laws, which may vary widely. The National Environmental Policy Act (NEPA), Resource Conservation and Recovery Act (RCRA), Comprehensive Environmental Response, Compensation, and Liability Act (CERCLA) and many more laws deal with the subject of surface mining. In some cases, even with proper legislation in place for surface mining some negative human health and environmental impacts remain.

=== Environmental impact ===
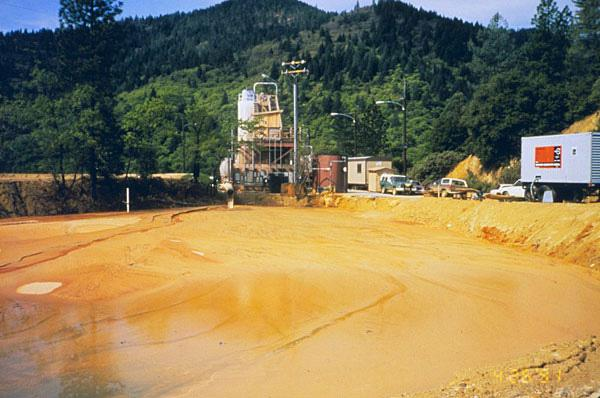
Acid leaching caused by sulfide ore mining

Surface mining can have a number of effects on the local environment. The negative effects involve soil, water, air, and noise pollution as well as landscape alteration and various other negatives. However, new technology and proper management can make it easier to properly treat the local water supply and restore the local ecology which helps rebuild the environment.

Each type of surface mining has its own environmental impact, as laid out below.

Strip mining - Once operations have ended, the tailings are placed back into the hole and covered up to make the site resemble the landscape before the mining operation. This process involves the removal of all ground vegetation in the area, which is a detriment to the environment. Topsoil may be placed over the tailing along with planting trees and other vegetation. Another reclamation method involves filling in the hole with water to create an artificial lake. Large tailing piles left behind may contain heavy metals which can leach out acids such as lead and copper and enter into water systems.

Open-pit mining - One of the world's largest types of mine and the size of these operations leave behind massive landscape scars, destruction to environmental habitats, and substantial clean-up cost. An open-pit mine can yield an enormous quantity of waste rock, sinkholes can form down the road, flooding and similar negative impacts as strip mining.

Mountaintop removal mining - Involves the removal of whole mountaintops, the waste rock of which is used to flatten out the surrounding land by infilling rivers and valleys. This is very destructive as it physically permanently alters the landscape and the associated ecosystem. Throughout the Appalachians in states such as Kentucky and Virginia, mountaintop removal is a common mining method where whole forests are cleared and the area becomes vulnerable to possible landslides, with restoration sometimes being too difficult/costly.

Dredging - A form of surface mining where the environmental impacts are primarily found underwater. The method of extracting material from the seafloor or any water body leads to the harmful risk of marine life. Overall, the effect are far less compared to the other mining methods. The influx of sediment can bury flora and fauna, change water levels and can alter the oxygen content. Water and noise pollution is a concern that must be monitored because marine life is very sensitive and vulnerable to drastic and harmful changes within their ecosystem.

Highwall mining - Has a lower environmental impact than mountaintop removal because of the smaller external surface area present but there are still negative side effects. Air and noise pollution from blasting are common environmental effects along with the large tailing piles, which can leach into waterways and numerous ecosystems.

=== Remediation ===
Properly cleaning, restoring, and removing hazards from a once operational surface mine requires a large sum of money and extensive environmental remediation. These remediation projects can continue on for years after the mine is closed. In some cases, the mining companies go bankrupt leaving abandoned mines with no funding for remediation. In other cases, mining companies are unwilling to pay for remediation, meaning litigation or regulatory action is necessary to compel the companies to commit funds to remediate. These legal issues often delay remediation and the environment is negatively affected.

In the United States, when the company does not exist anymore or is otherwise unable to clean the site, special taxes on hazardous waste producers (i.e. the Environmental Protection Agency Superfund) can be used to fund remediation projects. In Canada, there is a complex interaction between the evolving mining industry technologies, environmental protection legislation, and reclamation efforts.

== See also ==
- Shaft mining
- Hobet Coal Mine
