= WYLK =

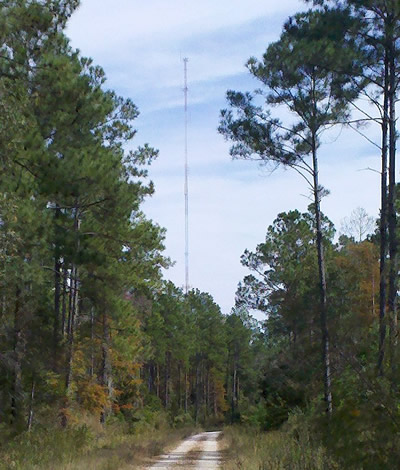
- WYLK broadcast tower near Lacombe, LA
- Lacombe, Louisiana; United States
- Broadcast area: New Orleans
- Frequency: 94.7 MHz
- Branding: Lake 94.7

Programming
- Format: Hot adult contemporary

Ownership
- Owner: Northshore Broadcasting

History
- First air date: 1992
- Former call signs: KPXD (1992); KPXF (1992–1996); WYLA (1996–2002); WXXF (2002–2003); WOPR (2003–2005)
- Call sign meaning: "Lake", referencing Lake Pontchartrain

Technical information
- Licensing authority: FCC
- Facility ID: 49247
- Class: A
- ERP: 2,900 watts
- HAAT: 146 meters
- Transmitter coordinates: 30°23′8.7″N 89°55′33.3″W

Links
- Public license information: Public file; LMS
- Website: lake947.net

WYLK (94.7 FM Lake 94.7), is a hot adult contemporary radio station licensed to Lacombe, Louisiana, owned by former Mississippi congressman Wayne Dowdy under the company name North Shore Broadcasting Co., Inc. The station serves the St. Tammany Parish area broadcasting at 94.7 MHz with an ERP of 2,900 watts.

== History ==
=== 1996 to 2001 ===
Charles K. And Carlie B. Winstanley were the founders of "Lake Radio" WYLA-FM 94.7 first came on the air in 1996, and the format was country. The station simulcast with WYLK-FM 104.7 Folsom, Louisiana, as a country combo known as "94.7/104.7 the Lake".

Styles Broadcasting acquired the stations in 1999 from Charles K.& Carlie B. Winstanley (The Radio Company), who were the founders and original owners of both stations. While 104.7 moved to a Smooth Jazz format as "Shore 104.7", 94.7 continued as a country station. However, it now simulcasted with WSJZ 94.9 out of Reserve, as "K94"; the station was a successful country simulcast to the New Orleans market. This lasted until 2000, when 94.9 was flipped to the Smooth Jazz format itself. 104.7 was eventually divested to C. Wayne Dowdy that same year. 94.7 returned to simulcasting 94.9, albeit with the Smooth Jazz format, in January 2001.

=== 2001 to 2010 ===
Later in 2001, Wilks Broadcasting assumed control of the stations, eventually purchasing them in 2002. In December 2001, 94.7 and 94.9 were flipped to a Hot Talk/Active Rock format as "94.9 Extreme Radio". This format lasted until November 2002, as the loss of the syndicated Opie & Anthony show, as well as Wilks' acquisition of Modern Rocker "106.7 the End", caused the stations to flip to a Gospel format as "Praise 94.9".

Citadel Communications acquired the combo of 94's in 2003, only to divest them to C. Wayne Dowdy's Southeastern Broadcasting company in early 2005.

Dowdy continued to broadcast the Gospel format until Hurricane Katrina. After the storm, 94.7 was shifted to "Radio Slidell", providing disaster information for the citizens of Slidell.

In November 2005, the "Praise" simulcast was officially broken up, as 94.7 switched to a commercial-free format of Hot Adult Contemporary music. This continued until December 31, 2005, when 94.7 took on the name of "Lake 94.7" and programmed a format local to St. Tammany Parish.

=== 2011 to present ===
As of October 2011, FCC records indicate that the 475 feet (145 m) WYLK broadcast tower is located just off Fish Hatchery Road, north of Lacombe. Northshore Broadcasting studios are located on Highway 190, near I-12.
