= WJSH =

Radio station in Folsom, Louisiana

- Folsom, Louisiana; United States
- Broadcast area: Northshore/Lake Pontchartrain
- Frequency: 104.7 MHz
- Branding: The Highway 104.7

Programming
- Format: Classic Country

Ownership
- Owner: North Shore Broadcasting Co., Inc.
- Sister stations: WFPR, WHMD, WTGG, WYLK

History
- First air date: 1990
- Former call signs: KGZC (1990–1996); WYLK (1996–1999); WSJZ (1999–2000)

Technical information
- Licensing authority: FCC
- Facility ID: 19616
- Class: A
- ERP: 6 kilowatts
- HAAT: 100 meters (330 ft)
- Transmitter coordinates: 30°39′55″N 90°04′49″W

Links
- Public license information: Public file; LMS
- Webcast: Listen Live
- Website: www.highway1047.com

WJSH (104.7 FM) is a classic country-formatted radio station licensed to Folsom, Louisiana. The format is known as "The Highway 104.7".

Previous callsigns were WSJH and WSJZ.

On October 25, 2019, this signal was transferred to North Shore Broadcasting.
