= Debtor in possession =

US corporation under bankruptcy protection but still in possession of its property

A debtor in possession (DIP) in United States bankruptcy law is a person or corporation who has filed a bankruptcy petition, but remains in possession of property upon which a creditor has a lien or similar security interest. A debtor becomes the debtor in possession after filing the bankruptcy petition. A corporation which continues to operate its business under Chapter 11 bankruptcy proceedings is a debtor in possession.

Under certain circumstances, the debtor in possession may be able to keep the property by paying the creditor the fair market value, as opposed to the contract price. For example, where the property is a personal vehicle which has depreciated since the time of the purchase, and which the debtor needs to find or continue employment to pay off his debts, the debtor may pay the creditor for the fair market value of the car to keep it.

On January 20, 2026, asset management firm GoldenTree committed to buying a roughly $200 million ‌portion of the debtor-in-possession financing of bankrupt retailer Saks Global, which owned hundreds of millions of dollars in inventory from brands including Chanel and Gucci.

== See also ==
- Debtor-in-possession financing
- Seniority (financial)
- Bailout
- Default (finance)
- Distressed securities
- Insolvency
- Liquidation
- Bankruptcy alternatives
