= WTVN =

Talk radio station in Columbus, Ohio

- Columbus, Ohio; United States
- Broadcast area: Columbus metro area
- Frequency: 610 kHz
- Branding: News Radio 610 WTVN

Programming
- Language: English
- Format: News/talk
- Network: ABC News Radio
- Affiliations: Compass Media Networks; Premiere Networks; Westwood One

Ownership
- Owner: iHeartMedia, Inc.; (iHM Licenses, LLC)
- Sister stations: WCOL-FM, WNCI, WODC, WXZX, WYTS, WZCB

History
- First air date: May 8, 1922
- Former call signs: WBAV (1922–1925); WAIU (1925–1936); WHKC (1936–1954)
- Former frequencies: 833 kHz (1922); 833 & 619 kHz (1922–1923); 770 kHz (1923–1924); 710 kHz (1924–1925); 1020 kHz (1925–1927); 1060 kHz (1927–1928); 640 kHz (1928–1945)
- Call sign meaning: derived from former sister station WTVN-TV

Technical information
- Licensing authority: FCC
- Facility ID: 11269
- Class: B
- Power: 5,000 watts
- Transmitter coordinates: 39°52′34″N 82°58′49″W
- Repeater: 93.3 WODC-HD2 (Ashville)

Links
- Public license information: Public file; LMS
- Webcast: Listen live (via iHeartRadio)
- Website: 610wtvn.iheart.com

WTVN (610 AM), branded as "News Radio 610 WTVN", is a commercial news/talk radio station licensed to Columbus, Ohio. Owned by iHeartMedia, the station serves the Columbus metro area. The WTVN studios area located in the McKinley Avenue Corridor northwest of Downtown Columbus, and its transmitter site is near Obetz. In addition to a standard analog transmission, the station simulcasts over the HD digital subchannel of co-owned 93.3 WODC, and streams online via iHeartRadio. WTVN began broadcasting in HD Radio in June 2005, but the in-band on-channel subcarrier was discontinued by 2015.

With 5,000 watts of power, during the day the station can be heard as far away as Indianapolis, Fort Wayne, Detroit, and Cleveland. At night, a directional antenna protects stations operating on the same frequency, including KCSP in Kansas City, WTEL in Philadelphia, and WIOD in Miami. The nighttime signal is primarily radiated northward over central Columbus, and outlying suburbs in the direction of the nulls experience a degraded signal.

== Programming ==
WTVN's programming is largely made up of co-owned Premiere Networks' nationally syndicated talk shows, including The Clay Travis and Buck Sexton Show, The Glenn Beck Program and Coast to Coast AM with George Noory live and The Sean Hannity Show on tape delay. WTVN has three local weekday talk hosts: Mike Elliott is heard in morning drive time, Mark Blazor hosts afternoons from 3-6pm and Chuck Douglas is in at 6:00pm as host of "The Power Hour".. At night, WTVN also carries The Mark Levin Show from Westwood One.

Weekends feature shows on money, health, real estate, guns, home repair, cars and the law. Weekend syndicated programs include In the Garden with Ron Wilson, This Morning, America's First News with Gordon Deal and Sunday Night with Bill Cunningham. World and national news is supplied by ABC News Radio.

== History ==
Effective December 1, 1921, the Department of Commerce, which regulated radio at this time, adopted regulations setting aside two wavelengths for use by broadcasting stations: 360 meters (833 kHz) for "entertainment" programs, and 485 meters (619 kHz) for "market and weather" reports. WTVN's first license, as WBAV, was issued on April 29, 1922, to the Erner & Hopkins Company at 146 North Third Street in Columbus, for operation on 360 meters. The WBAV call letters were randomly assigned from an alphabetical roster of available call signs.

The station made its formal debut on the evening of May 8, 1922, which the Columbus Dispatch heralded as "a success from every standpoint". A few months after receiving its initial license, WBAV was authorized to also broadcast on the 485 meter "market and weather" wavelength. In September 1922 the Department of Commerce set aside a second entertainment wavelength, 400 meters (750 kHz) for "Class B" stations that had quality equipment and programming. In May 1923 additional "Class B" frequencies were made available. One of the Ohio allocations was 770 kHz, and WBAV was assigned to this frequency on a time-sharing basis with WJAX in Cleveland. In mid-1924 WBAV was reassigned to 710 kHz, now sharing time with WLW in Cincinnati, which was changed in early 1925 to 1020 kHz, with a new timeshare partner of WEAO in Columbus.

In early November 1925, the American Insurance Union took over the station, changing the call letters to WAIU. WAIU was a charter member of the CBS Radio Network, being one of the 16 stations that aired the first CBS network program on September 18, 1927.

On June 15, 1927, the newly formed Federal Radio Commission (FRC) reassigned WAIU to 1060 kHz, still sharing time with WEAO. On November 11, 1928, the FRC made a major nationwide reallocation, implementing standards contained in its General Order 40. With these reassignments, most former "Class B" stations were granted a primary status on what were known as "clear channel" frequencies. However, WAIU was reduced to a secondary station on the clear channel frequency of 640 kHz. Also, now a "limited time" station, it had unrestricted daytime operating hours, but its evening hours were limited to operation only until sunset in Los Angeles, California, which was the location of the frequency's primary station, KFI.

On July 1, 1936, WAIU's call sign was changed to WHKC, to go with that of then commonly owned WHK in Cleveland.

=== 1945 move from 640 to 610 kHz ===
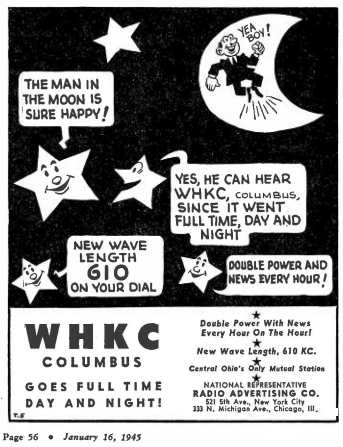
In 1945 the station, as WHKC, moved from 640 to 610 kHz.

In August 1941 the Federal Communications Commission (FCC) adopted a "duopoly" rule, which restricted licensees from operating more than one radio station in a city. At this time, in addition to owning WHKC in Columbus, United Broadcasting owned two stations in Cleveland: WHK and WCLE. As part of a successful plan to avoid having to give up one of its Cleveland stations, United arranged for a frequency swap between WCLE, then on 610 kHz, and WHKC on 640 kHz.

In order to conform to the duopoly restrictions, WCLE was moved from Cleveland to Akron. In conjunction with this transfer WCLE, which had been operating as a daytime-only station on 610 kHz, shifted to 640 kHz. This in turn made it possible for WHKC to move from 640 to 610 kHz. WHKC installed a directional antenna near Columbus, which allowed it to expand to full-time operation with 1,000 watts, starting in February 1945. In 1949 WHKC's power was increased to 5,000 watts day and night.

The station became WTVN on July 23, 1954, when it was acquired by Radio Cincinnati Inc., which later become Taft Broadcasting. The sale to the Taft family made 610 AM a sister station to WTVN-TV (channel 6); in 1960 Taft launched an FM station in Columbus, WTVN-FM (96.3, now WLVQ). In 1987 Taft was reorganized as Great American Broadcasting after financier Carl Lindner, Jr. succeeded in a hostile takeover of the company. Great American retained WTVN and WLVQ but not WTVN-TV (now WSYX), which was sold to former Taft shareholder Robert Bass and his new company, Anchor Media. Great American Broadcasting was renamed Citicasters in 1993. Jacor Communications purchased Citicasters in 1996. WLVQ was split from WTVN when the FM station was acquired by CBS Radio in 1998, and a year later Jacor was absorbed into Clear Channel Communications.

At one time, when WTVN still aired music programming, the station broadcast using C-QUAM AM Stereo. The stereo equipment was installed in 1988 but it was not until 1992 that the station operated in full stereo. Analog stereo transmissions ended several years later, though the internet feed remains stereophonic. WTVN also broadcast using iBiquity's HD Radio format in the late 2000s, though it was difficult to maintain a lock on the carrier and digital transmissions have since ceased.

An attempt was made to improve WTVN's coverage, by installing a new antenna array and increasing power to 50,000 watts. However, zoning problems at the antenna site could not be resolved. WTVN tried to claim the right to build new towers as a "public utility", but lost in court on May 12, 2002.

In 2006 the station replaced Pat Pagano and the meteorologists at Metro Weather Service with weather talent from WBNS-TV (channel 10), which was itself replaced by weather services from WSYX television.^{,} Metro Weather, based out of Valley Stream, New York, provided weather reports 24 hours, including Pagano during Bob Conners' morning show.

Afternoon drive was hosted by John Corby until his death on January 20, 2018.

== AIU Building ==
American Insurance Union owned the AIU Building (now the LeVeque Tower) in Columbus, which at the time was the tallest building in the city. Various radio facilities were located at the top of the skyscraper, including the transmitting antennae for WLWC (channel 4, now WCMH-TV) and WTVN-TV (channel 6, now WSYX). American Insurance Union later became part of Nationwide Insurance, owner of Nationwide Communications - former parent company of WNCI, which is a current sister station to WTVN.

== See also ==
- List of initial AM-band station grants in the United States
