= WCHO =

WCHO may refer to:

- WCHO (AM), a radio station at 1250 AM licensed to serve Washington Court House, Ohio, United States
- WCHO-FM, a radio station at 105.5 FM licensed to serve Washington Court House, Ohio
