= WSRW =

WSRW may refer to:

- WSRW (AM), a radio station (1590 AM) licensed to Hillsboro, Ohio, United States
- WSRW-FM, a radio station (105.7 FM) licensed to Grand Rapids, Michigan, United States.
- WQLX, a radio station (106.5 FM) licensed to Chillicothe, Ohio, United States, which held the call sign WSRW-FM from 1979 to 2009
