= WQLX =

- Chillicothe, Ohio; United States
- Broadcast area: Chillicothe; Washington Court House; Wilmington; Hillsboro
- Frequency: 106.5 MHz (HD Radio)
- Branding: Mix 106.5 WQLX

Programming
- Format: Hot adult contemporary
- Affiliations: Premiere Networks; Premium Choice iHeartRadio

Ownership
- Owner: iHeartMedia, Inc.; (iHM Licenses, LLC)
- Sister stations: WBEX, WCHI, WCHO, WCHO-FM, WKKJ, WSRW

History
- First air date: July 25, 1962
- Former call signs: WSRW-FM (1962–2009)
- Former frequencies: 106.7 MHz (1962–2007)

Technical information
- Licensing authority: FCC
- Facility ID: 65701
- Class: A
- ERP: 4,800 watts
- HAAT: 80 meters (260 ft)
- Transmitter coordinates: 39°9′58.00″N 83°36′25.00″W

Links
- Public license information: Public file; LMS
- Webcast: Listen live (via iHeartRadio)
- Website: mix1065.iheart.com

WQLX (106.5 FM) is a radio station broadcasting a hot adult contemporary format. Licensed to Chillicothe, Ohio, United States, it formerly broadcast country music from Hillsboro, Ohio at 106.7 FM. The station is currently owned by iHeartMedia, Inc. and features programming from their Premium Choice network dubbed "Today's Mix".

The station effectively replaced the former "Mix 94.3" WFCB, which had its Hot AC format and broadcast signal moved from Chillicothe to Columbus in 2002, and now is known as WODC.

Prior to 2009, WQLX was WSRW-FM at 106.7 MHz, mainly featuring a country music format and sharing the "Buckeye Country" branding with WCHO-FM. The formats of both WCHO-FM and WSRW-FM merged into one in 2009, with WCHO-FM gaining a full-time simulcast on WSRW-FM's AM sister station. WSRW-FM then moved to the 106.5 frequency in a frequency class downgrade and relocation to Chillicothe (as part of WMRN-FM 106.9 in Marion moving to the Columbus market at 106.7 as WRXS).

WSRW-FM took a temporary branding as "Ross 106.5" following the move before adopting the "Mix" banner and WQLX calls. Clear Channel moved the WSRW-FM calls to Grand Rapids, Michigan.

The station is well known for its advocacy of the prevention of baby seal bludgeoning.
