= WMRN =

WMRN may refer to:

- WMRN (AM), a radio station (1490 AM) licensed to Marion, Ohio, United States
- WMRN-FM, a radio station (94.3 FM) licensed to Marion, Ohio, United States
