= WYNT =

Radio station in Caledonia, Ohio

- Caledonia, Ohio; United States
- Broadcast area: Upper Sandusky, Marion, Bucyrus, Ohio
- Frequency: 95.9 MHz
- Branding: Majic 95.9

Programming
- Format: Hot adult contemporary
- Affiliations: Premiere Networks; Ohio State Sports Network

Ownership
- Owner: iHeartMedia, Inc.; (iHM Licenses, LLC)
- Sister stations: WMRN, WMRN-FM

History
- First air date: December 11, 1973 (as WYAN)
- Former call signs: WYAN (1973–1985)
- Call sign meaning: WYaNdoT County (home county of WYNT's former city of license, Upper Sandusky)

Technical information
- Licensing authority: FCC
- Facility ID: 68681
- Class: A
- ERP: 4,600 watts
- HAAT: 114 meters (374 ft)
- Transmitter coordinates: 40.682°N 83.007°W

Links
- Public license information: Public file; LMS
- Webcast: Listen Live
- Website: majic959.iheart.com

WYNT (95.9 FM) is a hot adult contemporary radio station formerly located in Upper Sandusky, Ohio, now located with its studios in Marion, Ohio, and its transmitter and city of license moved to Caledonia, Ohio. It broadcasts music from the 1990s through today as "Majic 95.9" and is part of the iHeartMedia, Inc.'s Marion cluster which includes WMRN and WMRN-FM. Its Cleveland FM sister WMJI also uses the "Majic" branding for its 1960s/70s oldies station. WYNT was also formerly an oldies station under the same branding.

The station had for years, served as a full-service adult contemporary/country music station serving Upper Sandusky, the seat of Wyandot County, as well as the communities surrounding Upper Sandusky, which is not to be confused with the town of Sandusky, Ohio...about 50 miles due north in Erie County, best known as the home of Cedar Point.

== History ==
According to the 1981 Broadcasting and Cable Yearbook, WYNT first went on the air on December 11, 1973, with the original call letters WYAN, licensed to Upper Sandusky.

The station was founded by Wendell A. Triplett, president of Triplett Broadcasting of Bellefontaine, Ohio; which also owned the former WTOO (now WBLL) in Bellefontaine, founded the former WPNM (currently WBUK) in Ottawa and the former WAXT (later WHTI, now WBKQ) in Alexandria, Indiana. Triplett's brother and company vice president Robert S. Triplett served as the station's first general manager, and also served as the station's chief engineer. T.P. Communications, a company headed by Charles Earl, then acquired WYAN in October 1979. Forest Whitehead, who would become a driving force in the station's future rescue from financial turmoil, became the station's general manager in 1980.

By 1981 the company had run into financial trouble and WYNT was silenced. However, the license was already in the planning stages of a return to the air by the end of 1982.

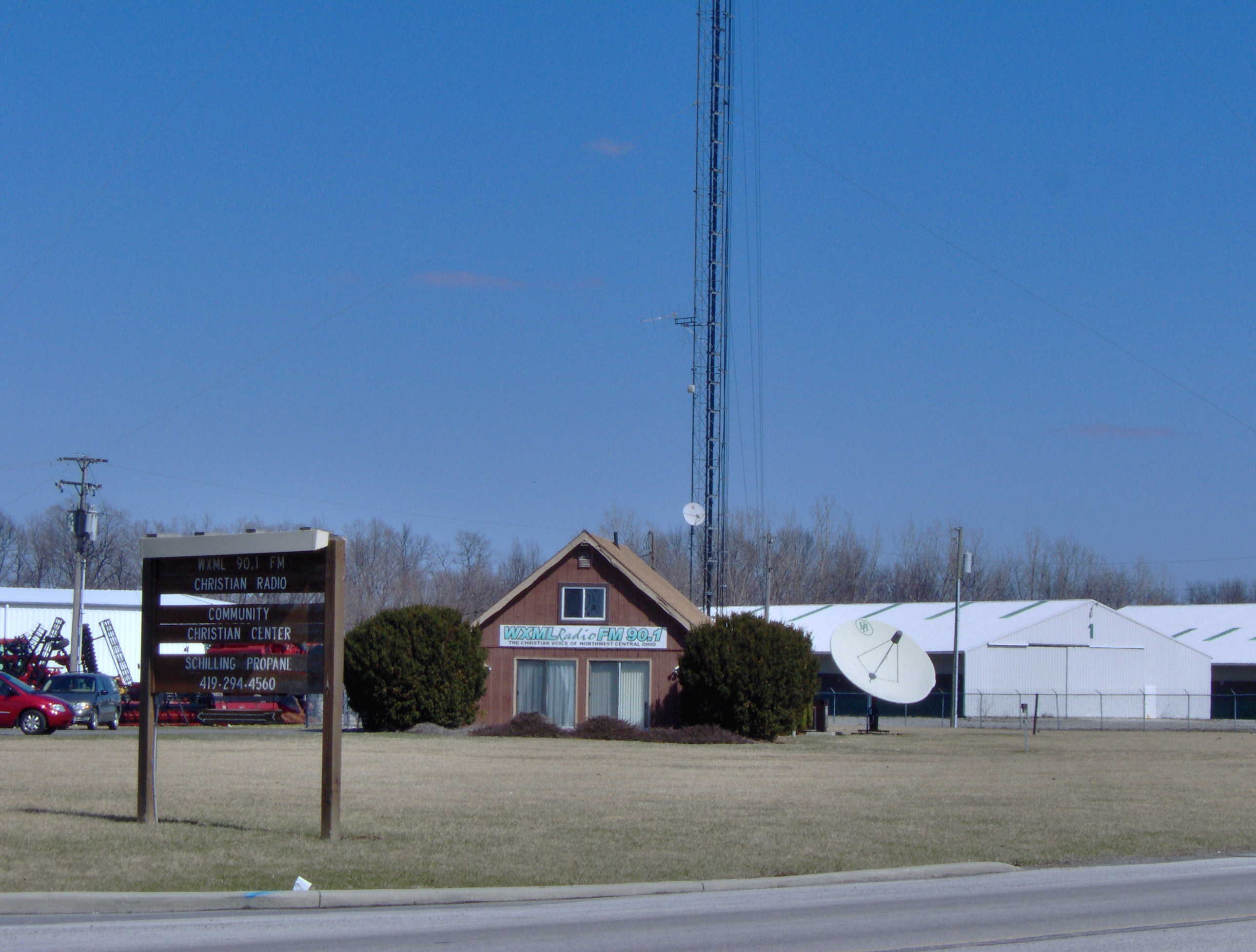
The original studio-office building and transmitter tower of WYAN, today used by WXML, a non-profit Christian radio station, on the outskirts of Upper Sandusky. WXML purchased this site after WYAN had fallen silent and its assets liquidated. WYAN would return to the air as WYNT at a site about a mile west of this site later.

Determined to keep the radio station in local hands, then-general manager and morning DJ Forest Whitehead and a local funeral director formed an ownership group, which subsequently returned the station to the air under the name U.S. Broadcasting in 1986. The funeral director stated he would invest in the station on the condition that it would provide the community with local high school sports game broadcasts, especially football.

According to the Radio Locator website, a construction permit has been granted to move the transmitter and city of license from Upper Sandusky to Caledonia located northeast of Marion, Ohio. Concurrent with the move, the station moved from an oldies to a Soft AC format, which has since been switched to Hot AC. Most of the station's programming comes from Clear Channel's Premium Choice Hot AC format, except for the locally originating morning show. Clear Channel ran a similar format previously on 94.3 WDIF (now the home of WMRN-FM after the original WMRN-FM was moved into the Columbus market).

Wendell A.Triplett died October 15, 1991, at the age of 65. Robert S. Triplett died April 5, 2020, at the age of 97.

As of November 20, 2006, this station was advertised for sale, along with other Clear Channel-owned radio stations operating out of Marion, Ohio. In May 2007, WYNT and the other stations of the Marion cluster of Clear Channel Communications was to have been sold to Florida-based GoodRadio.TV LLC, but the deal has since collapsed.
