= WGAR-FM =

Country music radio station in Cleveland

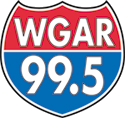
- Cleveland, Ohio; United States
- Broadcast area: Greater Cleveland
- Frequency: 99.5 MHz (HD Radio)
- Branding: 99.5 WGAR

Programming
- Language: English
- Format: Country music
- Subchannels: HD2: TikTok Radio
- Affiliations: Premiere Networks

Ownership
- Owner: iHeartMedia; (iHM Licenses, LLC)
- Sister stations: WAKS; WARF; WHLK; WMJI; WMMS; WTAM

History
- First air date: December 15, 1952
- Former call signs: WGAR-FM (1952–1970); WNCR (1970–1975); WKSW (1975–1984)
- Call sign meaning: George A. Richards, founder of WGAR (1220 AM)

Technical information
- Licensing authority: FCC
- Facility ID: 47740
- Class: B
- ERP: 50,000 watts
- HAAT: 152 meters (499 ft)
- Transmitter coordinates: 41°22′18.00″N 81°43′4.00″W

Links
- Public license information: Public file; LMS
- Webcast: Listen live (via iHeartRadio)
- Website: wgar.iheart.com

WGAR-FM (99.5 FM) is a commercial radio station licensed to Cleveland, Ohio, United States, featuring a country music format. Owned by iHeartMedia, the station serves Greater Cleveland and surrounding Northeast Ohio as the local affiliate for The Bobby Bones Show. WGAR-FM's studios are located at the Six Six Eight Building in downtown Cleveland's Gateway District, and the station's transmitter is in nearby Parma. Along with a standard analog transmission, WGAR-FM broadcasts over two HD Radio channels and is available online via iHeartRadio.

Signing on in 1952 as the FM extension of WGAR (1220 AM), WGAR-FM mostly operated in obscurity until 1970, when owner Nationwide Communications instituted a progressive rock format as WNCR. Airstaff turnover, conflicts with management and increased competition from other rock stations led to a format change to Top 40 in 1973, country in 1974 and again to easy listening as WKSW in 1975. Returning to country in 1980, WKSW became WGAR-FM in 1984 in tandem with WGAR, with the AM simulcasting the FM from 1986 to 1990. WGAR-FM has remained in the format ever since, even with multiple ownership, management and airstaff changes. Since 1999, iHeartMedia (known as Clear Channel Communications until 2014) has owned WGAR-FM as part of their Greater Cleveland cluster.

== History ==
=== WGAR-FM (1952–1970) ===
The WGAR Broadcasting Company, a group led by George A. Richards and owner of WGAR (1220 AM), first filed paperwork on January 17, 1944, to establish an FM adjunct at 45.5 MHz but due to the number of applicants exceeding the number of available channels, WGAR's application was put through a competitive hearing in April 1946. The Federal Communications Commission (FCC) decided in WGAR's favor that June, but the commission's proposed power output and height above average terrain (HAAT) was significantly less than what the station had requested, thus putting the application through another set of oral arguments. Richards died on May 28, 1951, during a prolonged legal fight to keep his station licenses; widow Frances S. Richards was bequeathed the radio station group and sold WGAR to Peoples Broadcasting Corp. for $1.75 million (equivalent to $21.1 million in 2025) on December 4, 1953.

WGAR-FM launched on December 15, 1952, co-located with WGAR at the Hotel Statler in downtown Cleveland and with their transmitter at WGAR's existing Broadview Heights facilities. For the next 17 years, WGAR-FM operated either as a simulcast of WGAR for the majority of the day, breaking away in the evenings to carry three hours of classical music, or operated for only two hours a week to maintain their license. WGAR-FM adopted a separate program schedule on December 19, 1967, becoming the last FM station in the market to conform with the FCC's FM Non-Duplication Rule; Tom Armstrong's WGAR morning show continued to be simulcast alongside a mix of album music, jazz and classical. Peoples Broadcasting was renamed to Nationwide Communications in February 1967; in an interview with Broadcasting magazine later in the year, George Washington Campbell announced intentions to turn WGAR-FM into a separate entity "as soon as major technical improvements are made". By November 1969, WGAR-FM's transmitter was moved to Parma alongside State Road (Ohio SR 94).

=== WNCR (1970–1975) ===
Starting in 1970, WGAR-FM underwent substantial changes alongside WGAR, both being regarded by Nationwide executives as "sleeping giants" in the Cleveland market. Having upgraded to stereo the year before, WGAR-FM was renamed WNCR on May 4; the callsign being a direct reference to "Nationwide Communications Radio" similar to co-owned WNCI in Columbus. On July 6, 1970, WNCR launched a progressive rock full-time, returning the format to Cleveland for the first time since WMMS had dropped it in late May 1969. The format choice reportedly caught Nationwide management off guard, with some executives expecting the music direction to have a Top 40 style similar to WNCI. One month later, Jack G. Thayer was hired as WGAR's general manager, and along with program director John Lund, initiated an adult contemporary format on the AM station headlined by Don Imus. Thayer's managerial style soon conflicted with WNCR's airstaff. After an attempted mediation with Thayer and Imus as a mediator failed, the entire on-air staff staged a walkout on September 18, 1970, demanding contracts for existing staff, the maintaining of control over music selections and managerial changes; all were fired and later conveyed their discontent to Plain Dealer reporter Jane Scott.

If you remember Glenn Miller and Gabriel Heatter, you really ought to tune in and turn on with the likes of Kyle, who sings, and Billy Bass, who introduces the news with the phrase: 'And now WNCR lays the hard stuff on you.'

— Bill Barrett, Cleveland Press, April 27, 1971

A replacement airstaff was hired within ten days having astrological signs as their stage names; WCLV (95.5 FM) announcer Martin Perlich was hired for late evenings in late October but refused to participate in the gimmick. WIXY announcer Billy Bass became program director at year's end, and hired two WIXY staffers to augment the airstaff. Bass had prior on-air experience with the first iteration of progressive rock on WMMS in 1968 and had attained considerable success as WIXY's overnight host despite knowing little about the Top 40 format. Both he and Perlich had been under consideration for WNCR's initial airstaff months earlier but were bypassed due to their political beliefs; Bass later referred to Perlich as FM rock's conscience "even though he was a communist!" Even with no managerial experience, Bass has been credited for building WNCR into a credible progressive rock station that he called "People Radio", centered around community involvement. As Bass later stated to Radio & Records, "WNCR became an unbelievable commercial success. We were interested in breaking acts and it just happened. It was great."

Bill Barrett, radio critic for the Cleveland Press, began a multi-part review of WNCR in late April 1971 by replying to a reader asking him what kind of station it was with, "dadburned if I know!" Barrett critiqued the station's use of "musical crudities" in songs played that included "the ultimate four-letter word" along with editorial-heavy newscasts being "a sort of little theater of news" analogous to the conservative-leaning Paul Harvey on WGAR. David Spero—son of area television producer Herman Spero, who produced a half-hour late-night television show starring Don Imus—was hired by WNCR on referral by Imus. WNCR's success got the attention of WMMS general manager David Moorehead, who began extending an invitation for Bass to rejoin that station. An eventual series of conflicts between WNCR management and Nationwide executives led Bass to publicly resign on September 23, 1971, in an interview with alternative newspaper Great Swamp Erie da da Boom, disclosing in the process that he had relieved of his program director role several weeks earlier. Moorehead immediately hired not only Bass, but Perlich and Spero, all of whom joined WMMS the following week, but neither of them were aware of WMMS and WHK's pending sale to Malrite Communications three months later or of Moorehead's transfer to KMET in Los Angeles. WNCR continued the format with the remaining airstaff and moved their studios to the Stouffer Building in Playhouse Square, but rumors persisted of internal conflicts between management over the station's musical direction.

WNCR dropped the rock format on January 16, 1973, in favor of Top 40 now directly patterned after WNCI, dismissing the entire airstaff. Future WMMS program director John Gorman saw the move as Nationwide's conservative ownership "torpedoing" the station as they were uncomfortable with a progressive format. The Top 40 format lasted until March 4, 1974, when WNCR switched to country music, returning the format full-time to the Cleveland market since 1971, when WCJW was sold off. Within weeks of WNCR's switch, WHK also flipped to country, a format Malrite had originally intended for WMMS. Despite the immediate competition from WHK, the next Arbitron ratings book showed WNCR as one of four Cleveland FM stations among the market's top ten stations, which was also attributed to increased presence of FM tuners installed in automobiles. Gorman retrospectively stated that WMMS "dodged a bullet" with this switch, as Nationwide had declined to move WGAR's highly rated contemporary format over to the FM dial.

=== WKSW (1975–1984) ===
Despite positive ratings that Radio & Records columnist Biff Collie referred to as "husky", Nationwide announced WNCR would drop the country format on June 1, 1975, dismissing all airstaff in what was termed a "power struggle in the corporate structure". The station switched to an automated beautiful music/easy listening format developed by, and named after, Jim Schulke; WNCR management cited the success of the Schulke format in 70 other markets. Dubbed "FM-100: All music, All the time", the call sign changed to WKSW on September 15, 1975. "FM-100" featured a minimum of on-air talk and no backselling of songs played, but Schulke would later add a local airstaff in 1979—including veteran middle of the road (MOR) host Ted Lux for mornings—in an experiment to boost ratings. The previous summer, rumors of WKSW flipping to Lee Abrams' "Soft Superstars" format were downplayed by management but WKSW was one of three beautiful music stations in the market and typically ranked third in the ratings. WKSW's format was switched back to country as "KS100" on April 8, 1980, conceding the station's continued ratings struggles.

While initially re-entering into competition with talk-heavy WHK, WWWE also switched to country in December 1981, emphasizing a balance on personality and music as opposed to WKSW, which WWWE's program director likened to "a jukebox ... (playing) maybe 16 or 17 songs an hour." Ratings for all three stations struggled, with WWWE failing to catch on in the Spring 1982 Arbitron book, while WHK and WKSW both saw slight declines. At the same time, WKSW became the target of a "practical joker" who submitted fraudulent press releases of a format change to adult contemporary using the station's old stationery. Chuck Collier, an on-air host at WGAR from 1970 to 1973 and again beginning in 1975, moved to WKSW in September 1983 as evening host and music director. WKSW's competition eventually bowed out: WWWE returned to MOR by August 1983, while WHK flipped to oldies in April 1984. WWWE general manager Tom Wilson cited WWWE's lackluster ratings performance and WKSW and WHK's struggles as proof of "declining demand" for country, saying "Cleveland is more cosmopolitan than a lot of people take it for."

=== WGAR-FM (1984–present) ===
==== Inheriting WGAR's legacy ====
WKSW re-adopted the WGAR-FM call sign on July 15, 1984, a move concurrent with WGAR switching to country; both stations simulcast Paul Tapie's morning show, who had recently taken over for John Lanigan on the AM station. The combination resulted in former WKSW morning host Josh Tyler in middays, John Olsen in afternoons, Collier in evenings, former WGAR host Jay Hudson in overnights, and Jim Szymanski as a fill-in; John Arthur replaced Olsen in afternoons the following year. While initially separately programmed, with WGAR carrying programming from Satellite Music Network for much of the day, the AM station soon began simulcasting the FM outright by the fall of 1986, a move timed with Tapie's departure for WNCX and made possible after the FCC repealed the FM Non-Duplication Rule. WGAR-FM also inherited WGAR's existing news department, which was downscaled to three staffers and newscasts now only scheduled in both drive times, noon and Saturday mornings. WGAR's only deviation from the simulcast occurred with Cleveland Force play-by-play.

Nationwide Communications sold WGAR to Douglas Broadcasting in August 1989 for $2 million (equivalent to $5.19 million in 2025). The AM station barely registered in the Arbitron ratings on its own as both stations had a combined rating published by the same agency throughout the simulcast period. WGAR broke away from the simulcast on June 29, 1990, to run a ten-minute sendoff prior to midnight; after it ended, WGAR changed calls to WKNR and picked up a satellite music feed. WGAR-FM remained in the Broadview Heights studios for the next few months until a new studio/office facility at the Crown Centre in Independence could be completed, resulting in what one WKNR executive called a claustrophobic "mom-and-pop setup" between the two. The move to Crown Centre was made in mid-March 1991. As WGAR-FM had been directly connected to the AM station for nearly four years, it claimed the AM's history as its own; when WGAR-FM won the 1995 CMA Award for "Station of the Year", Kevin C. Johnson of the Akron Beacon Journal noted the call letters were "perhaps already associated with greatness", invoking the names of Don Imus, John Lanigan and Jack Paar.

Shortly before the AM station's sale, Dave Perkins was hired as morning host, leaving at the end of 1991 after purchasing KCDQ in Odessa, Texas. Prior to his departure, wife Amy Perkins was abducted and murdered in a downtown Cleveland parking lot on which Progressive Field now stands, the subsequent murder trial attracted significant media attention and sympathy for Perkins. Jim Mantel, who took over in mornings on May 4, 1992, later remarked on the difficulty of debuting under those circumstances, but his friendship with Perkins helped enable listeners to accept him. Danny Wright, known as "Dancin' Danny Wright" at WGCL (now WNCX) in the early 1980s, joined the station in November 1994 after soliciting for job opportunities over Prodigy, which got the attention of WGAR program director Denny Nugent; his debut at WGAR showed immediate success, ranking number one in his timeslot. Throughout the mid-1990s, WGAR boasted an airstaff of Mantel and Erin Weber in mornings, Chuck Collier and Wright middays, John Arthur afternoons, Mike Ivers evenings and Jim Szymanski overnights. Mantel was later paired with John Dobeck and newscaster Ed Richards, while Weber was paired with Arthur.

==== Post-1996 consolidation ====
A series of ownership transactions and mergers occurred at WGAR-FM in the late 1990s, spurred on by industry consolidation in the wake of the Telecommunications Act of 1996. Nationwide Communications first purchased WMMS and WMJI from OmniAmerica on April 22, 1996, for $43.5 million (equivalent to $89.3 million in 2025) and one of Nationwide's Orlando stations. Nationwide then sold their entire broadcast group to Jacor for $620 million (equivalent to $1.24 billion in 2025) on October 27, 1997, putting WGAR, WMJI and WMMS under the same ownership as WTAM and WMVX, along with pending acquisition WKNR; Jacor divested WKNR to Capstar Broadcasting to complete the deal. Denny Nugent was dismissed as program director following the sale, with Jacor executive Kevin Metheny considering the station to have been "underachieving" and "needed a new energy, a new approach". Replacement program director Clay Hunnicutt implemented several changes, including station promos now having a "smart-alecky" tone, and reduced on-air chatter from "leisurely stories".

The first of multiple budget-related firings also took place, first with afternoon co-hosts John Arthur and Erin Weber, with Arthur expressing disappointment over not being able to say goodbye on-air. The news department was merged into WTAM's, ending past practices of WGAR, WMJI and WMMS each having separate news operations. Concurrent with these moves, Jacor had put itself up for sale, with Clear Channel Communications purchasing it for $6.5 billion (equivalent to $12.8 billion in 2025) on October 8, 1998. General manager John Blassingame was fired in March 2000, hours before he was to speak at the Country Radio Broadcasters' annual "Country Radio Seminar" regarding career survival in a consolidated radio environment. Hunnicutt left several months later, with Meg Stevens becoming program director. All six stations moved to a new combined facility at the former Centerior Energy headquarters in Independence, including WGAR's 40 employees; a 2002 newspaper story called the new studio arrangement "a food court of radio, with McDonald's, Burger King and Taco Bell".

==== Downsizing, transitions and after-effects ====
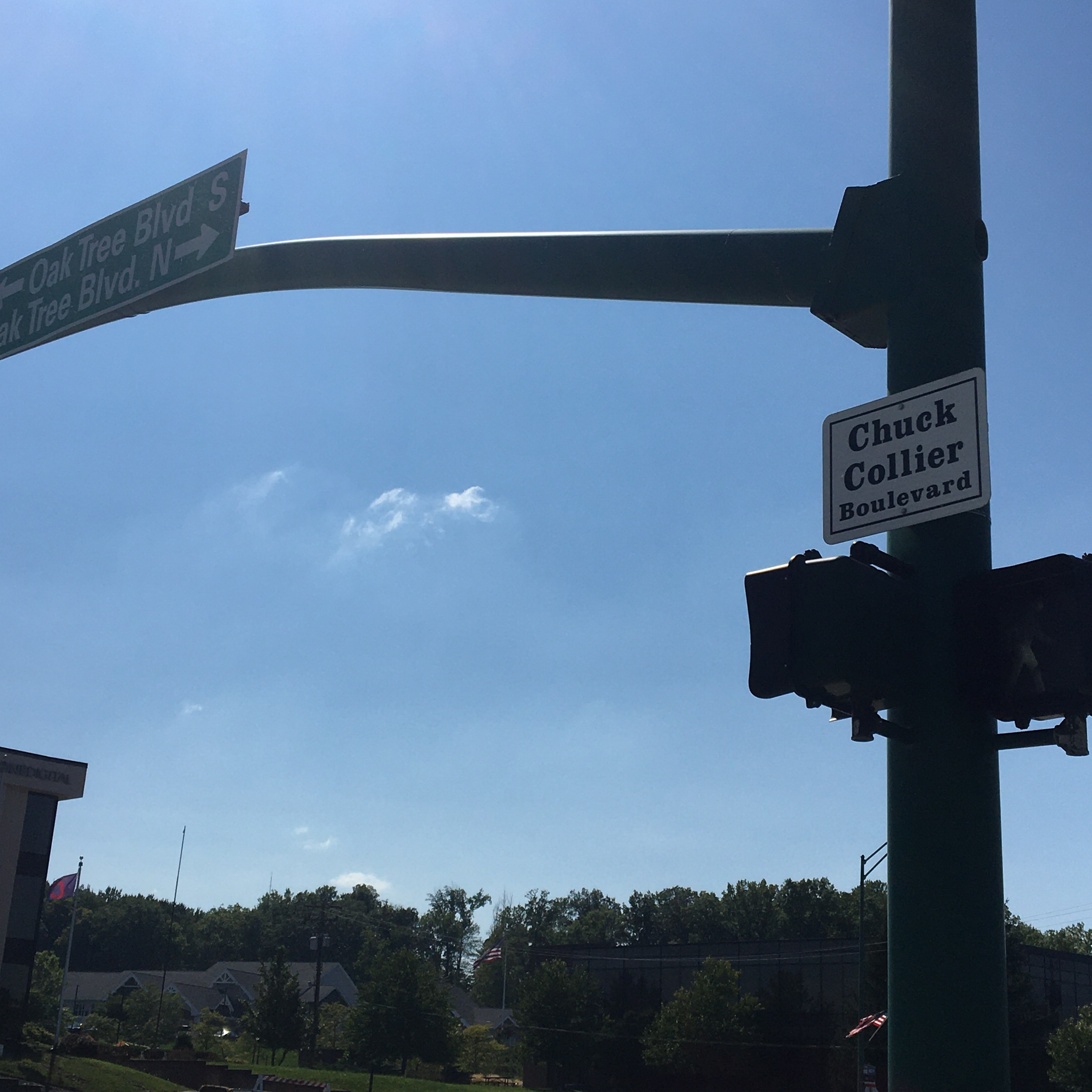
Ceremonial sign for "Chuck Collier Boulevard" in Independence, formerly the location of WGAR-FM's studios.

Subsequent downsizing took place over the next decade. Ed Richards was dismissed along with five other on-air hosts throughout the Cleveland cluster in February 2001, while Danny Wright was among eight staffers fired on November 1, 2001, both attributed to the early 2000s recession. Wright was replaced with WPOC personality Michael J. Fox through voice-tracking. John Dobeck was also dismissed in October 2002 after 13 years with the station, but was not a cost-cutting move. Michelle Maloney assumed his role as morning co-host in 2004, with Fox and Collier also switching time slots. Following Bain Capital's 2008 private equity buyout of Clear Channel, Maloney was dismissed in January 2009, followed by program director Brian Jennings (who replaced Stevens in 2007) in March 2009 as part of broader downsizing efforts; an internal "Premium Choice" voice-tracking network was implemented within the company's stations, which WGAR uses to this day. Clear Channel was renamed iHeartMedia on September 16, 2014, taking its name from the company's iHeartRadio streaming platform.

Mantel's contract lapsed on August 17, 2010, ending an 18-year run in mornings; Tim Leary and LeeAnn Sommers were named as his replacements, with Brian Fowler taking over for Leary in 2011. Like Wright before them, Fowler and Sommers had lengthy experience in other formats: Sommers was with several CHR, urban and hot AC stations throughout the 1990s and 2000s, while Fowler had been a fixture at WENZ, WMMS and WMVX during the same timeframe. Fowler and Sommers showed immediate success, reaching the number one ranking in the 25–54 demographic in their first year and number one in all key demographics by 2015; their success was attributed in part to a growing mainstream appeal for country music.

There was no one who worked harder than Chuck... with the small size of radio staffs these days, there was always a ton of various details to handle before the end of the day. Chuck did it all. But if you needed him for something or walked up to him in public, YOU were the total focus of his beneficent attention. He was almost the Country Radio Buddha.

— Chris Miller, former WGAR-FM program director, on Chuck Collier

The biggest loss to the station occurred when Chuck Collier died of a heart attack on September 22, 2011, having become synonymous with WGAR through his lengthy tenure of 39 years and 13 different program directors. Collier was also a 2009 inductee into the Country Music Radio Hall of Fame and was remembered for his devotion to the station and strong work ethic, scheduling WGAR's music playlists, interacting with industry representatives and later voice-tracking middays at WMJI. Oak Tree Boulevard was ceremonially renamed to "Chuck Collier Boulevard" by the city of Independence on March 9, 2012.

Fowler left the station in early October 2018, with Steve Wazz taking over alongside incumbent co-host LeeAnn Sommers shortly thereafter. A schedule realignment in May 2020 saw Sommers swap timeslots with afternoon host/program director Carletta Blake. Along with the other eight stations in iHeartMedia's Cleveland operations, WGAR announced plans on March 21, 2021, to move to a new combined studio/office facility at the Six Six Eight building in downtown Cleveland, using cloud storage technology. The relocation process was completed in July 2022.

Wazz left the station in March 2024 following a further series of downsizing across the company; The Bobby Bones Show, which previously ran over WGAR in evenings, was consequently moved to morning drive.

== Current programming ==
WGAR's local personalities include Keith Kennedy and LeeAnn Sommers. The station also carries The Bobby Bones Show in mornings and After MidNite with Granger Smith in overnights, both through Premiere Networks. Other talent is voice-tracked via iHeartMedia's internal "Premium Choice" network.

== Bibliography ==
- Gorman, John; Feran, Tom (2007). The Buzzard: Inside the Glory Days of WMMS and Cleveland Rock Radio. Cleveland: Gray & Co. ISBN 9781886228474.
- Olszewski, Mike (2003). Radio Daze: Stories from the Front in Cleveland's FM Air Wars. Kent, Ohio: Kent State University Press. ISBN 9780873387736. Archived from the original on December 9, 2016 – via Google Books.
- Olszewski, Mike; Berg, Richard; Wolff, Carlo (2011). WIXY 1260: Pixies, Six-Packs, and Supermen (PDF). Kent, Ohio: Black Squirrel Books. p. 88. ISBN 978-1-60635-099-7. Archived (PDF) from the original on September 26, 2021.
- In re Applications of G.A. Richards, transferor, and Harry J. Klinger, Lawrence P. Fisher and John H. Hannah, transferees, for consent to the transfer of control of KMPC, the Station of the Stars, Inc., Los Angeles, Calif., Docket No. 9402, WJR, the Goodwill Station, Inc., Detroit, Michigan, Docket No. 9403 [and] WGAR Broadcasting Company, Cleveland, Ohio, Docket No. 9404. For renewal of license of Radio Stations KMPC, the Station of the Stars, Inc. ... Docket No. 9468, File No. BR-18, WJR, the Goodwill Station, Inc. ... Docket No. 9469, File No. BR-331 [and] WGAR Broadcasting Company ... Docket No. 9405, File No. BR-283: Exhibits of the WGAR Broadcasting Company (PDF). Vol. 1. Washington, D.C.: Fulton, Walter & Halley. 1948. Archived (PDF) from the original on September 29, 2021 – via World Radio History.
- In re Applications of G.A. Richards, transferor, and Harry J. Klinger, Lawrence P. Fisher and John H. Hannah, transferees, for consent to the transfer of control of KMPC, the Station of the Stars, Inc., Los Angeles, Calif., Docket No. 9402, WJR, the Goodwill Station, Inc., Detroit, Michigan, Docket No. 9403 [and] WGAR Broadcasting Company, Cleveland, Ohio, Docket No. 9404. For renewal of license of Radio Stations KMPC, the Station of the Stars, Inc. ... Docket No. 9468, File No. BR-18, WJR, the Goodwill Station, Inc. ... Docket No. 9469, File No. BR-331 [and] WGAR Broadcasting Company ... Docket No. 9405, File No. BR-283: Exhibits of the WGAR Broadcasting Company (PDF). Vol. 2. Washington, D.C.: Fulton, Walter & Halley. 1948. Archived (PDF) from the original on August 25, 2021 – via World Radio History.
