= WYTS =

Radio station in Columbus, Ohio

- Columbus, Ohio; United States
- Broadcast area: Columbus, Ohio
- Frequency: 1230 kHz
- Branding: Columbus' BIN 1230

Programming
- Format: Black-oriented news
- Affiliations: Black Information Network

Ownership
- Owner: iHeartMedia, Inc.; (iHM Licenses, LLC)
- Sister stations: WCOL-FM, WNCI, WODC, WTVN, WXZX, WZCB

History
- First air date: September 24, 1922
- Former call signs: WMAN (1922–1930); WSEN (1930–1934); WCOL (1934–1997); WFII (1997–2001); WZNW (2001–2003); WCOL (2003–2004); WTPG (2004–2007)
- Call sign meaning: "Your Talk Station" (previous format)

Technical information
- Licensing authority: FCC
- Facility ID: 25038
- Class: C
- Power: 1,000 watts
- Transmitter coordinates: 39°56′31″N 83°01′20″W

Links
- Public license information: Public file; LMS
- Webcast: Listen live (via iHeartRadio)
- Website: ohio.binnews.com

WYTS (1230 AM) is a commercial black-oriented news radio station licensed to Columbus, Ohio. Owned by iHeartMedia, the station serves the Columbus metro area. Besides a standard analog transmission, the station is available online via iHeartRadio. The WYTS studios are located along in Downtown Columbus, while the station transmitter resides southwest of the city's downtown area.

WYTS is the sixth-oldest continuously running radio station in the state of Ohio, and is best known for its Top 40 format in the 1960s and 1970s under the heritage WCOL calls. In the time period between 1998 and today, the station has undergone five different format changes with as many different call signs.

== History ==
=== Early years ===
==== WMAN / WSEN ====
WYTS was first licensed, as WMAN, to the Broad Street Baptist Church in downtown Columbus on October 5, 1922. The original call letters were randomly assigned from a sequential roster of available call signs. Studios and transmitter were located within the church, and its initial schedule was only a few hours of church services each Sunday. Church member W. E. Heskett became the license holder of WMAN in conjunction with the church in December 1924, and had purchased the station outright by 1927. Hours of operation expanded gradually beyond Sunday services, and WMAN's studios were relocated to the Seneca Hotel.

Heskett leased airtime on WMAN to the Columbus Broadcasting Corporation in late 1929, with a buyout following months later. In order to distance the station from its original religious image, its call sign was changed to WSEN on September 9, 1930, reflecting the Seneca Hotel. By 1932, the station operated on a daily basis from 8:00 a.m. until midnight.

==== WCOL ====
The station became WCOL on September 11, 1934, upon its sale to The Columbus Dispatch Publishing Company, headed by Edgar and Robert F. Wolfe, whose family also owned WBNS (AM) and WBNS-FM Radio. WCOL and WBNS shared studios and offices, with WCOL eventually affiliating with both the NBC Red and Blue networks by 1937 (retaining the Blue affiliation in 1943). In 1941, implementation of the North American Regional Broadcasting Agreement moved WCOL to 1230 kHz, where it has remained ever since.

The August 1941 adoption of the Federal Communications Commission's "duopoly" rule restricted licensees from operating more than one radio station in a given market. WCOL was spun off by the Wolfe family to a partnership headed by several members of The Pixleys Incorporated, headed by family members Lloyd Pixley, Martha Pixley and Grace Pixley. Lloyd was the son of former WBAV operator Milton Pixley (today known as WTVN), and became president of WCOL with the sale. The station soon received both a new transmitter, and an FM sister station at 92.3 MHz, which also took the WCOL calls.

The Pixleys sold WCOL AM and FM to Air Trails, Inc. in January 1952. Air Trails, and its successor Great Trails Broadcasting would be the primary owners of WCOL for over 52 years. Operating power for the station was increased to 1,000 watts during the daytime by July 1960, along with broadcasting 24-hours a day. By then an independent station, it changed its format to Top-40 that July 1, dubbing itself "The New WCOL".

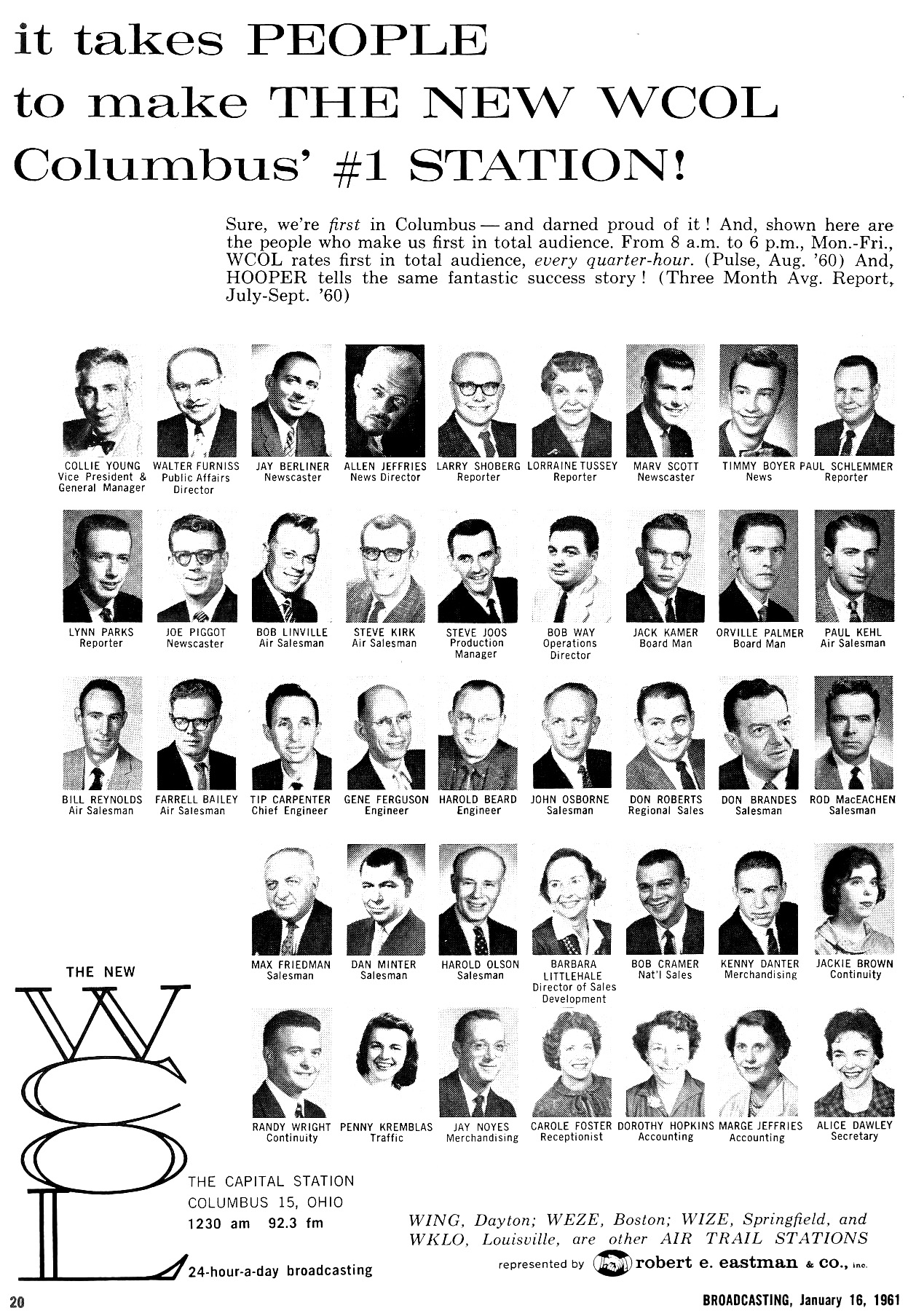
Beginning in 1960, the station's slogan was "The New WCOL".

WCOL was best known to Columbus area residents throughout the 1960s during this era, and was the primary Top-40 format station in the Columbus market when its jingle "twelve thirty the new W-C-O-L" was part of the local audio landscape. It held this distinction from 1960 to the early 1970s, until the rise in popularity of FM broadcasting and competition from WNCI.

WCOL, in its Top-40 heyday was heralded as the station which "premiered" the hits. Bryan McIntyre gained national award recognition for his uncanny ability to pick hit music, in advance of other radio markets. The WCOL calls were also used in tribute as the backdrop for the 1996 Tom Hanks movie "That Thing You Do."

Air Trails was renamed Great Trails Broadcasting in 1969 after a corporate reorganization, but still retaining much of the management and personnel. Great Trails also would own regional stations WING in Dayton, WIZE in Springfield, WGTZ (now WJAI) in Eaton, and WKLO (now WKJK) and WKLO-FM (now WDJX-FM) in Louisville during this time. WCOL-FM would also see changes, splitting away from the AM station to highlight a progressive rock format before becoming "92X" WXGT (for "X-Great Trails") where the top 40 format was moved to.

As the 1970s faded, the station changed format to a more adult-contemporary focus. WCOL was still successful in this format until a series of management and airstaff changeovers followed in the early 1980s, including a brief switch to middle of the road-styled adult standards and the brief return of Columbus broadcast legend Spook Beckman. The station began broadcasting at 1,000 watts 24-hours a day, along with a format change to news/talk. After that format failed to show in the ratings, WCOL flipped back to "Top-40 Oldies" with the WXGT calls dropped reverting to WCOL-FM.

By 1991, WCOL-AM was simulcasting WCOL-FM's oldies programming, with the AM station soon breaking off to play 1950s oldies. In short order, WCOL went back to a news/talk format, only this time assuming a mostly-syndicated lineup.

=== Later years ===
The station and WCOL-FM were sold to Nationwide Communications in 1994, the parent company of WNCI.

WCOL became WFII on March 24, 1997, airing a syndicated conservative talk radio format as "1230 FYI," though this time it was oriented at younger listeners. WTVN owner Jacor Communications acquired WFII, WCOL and WNCI in August 1998, and ultimately merged with Clear Channel Communications (now iHeartMedia) that next year.

WFII was not a ratings success, and in 2001 the station became WZNW, airing a sports talk format as "1230 The Zone". However, WZNW was never able to compete effectively against the other full-time sports station in Columbus, WBNS, which held the rights to the Ohio State Buckeyes.

WCOL returned to 1230 in 2003, playing pre-British Invasion pop/rock as "Real Oldies 1230". WCOL traded in on its heritage as a Top 40 station, and the "Real Oldies" format played much of the same music. They even used some of their vintage PAMS and TM jingles from that era. Despite some positive "buzz" from long-time radio listeners, many of whom remembered WCOL from its Top 40 heyday, the format failed to capture a significant audience in the market. The station, mostly automated using voice-tracking, lacked the live personalities which made the original WCOL great.

At noon on September 7, 2004, WCOL became WTPG, as "Progressive Talk AM 1230." WTPG carried programming mostly from the Air America Radio network, as well as syndicated hosts Ed Schulz, Springer on the Radio (via a 21-hour delay in morning drive) and Stephanie Miller. WTPG saw mild ratings improvements, although (as was the case with WFII, WZNW and WCOL) ranked well behind counter-programmed sister station WTVN.

On December 23, 2006, the Columbus Dispatch reported that WTPG would change again that January 8 over to a conservative-based talk format, under the WYTS calls. Bruce Collins, the local program director for WTVN and WYTS, said: "Whether it's politics or sports, financial information or general advice, central Ohio listeners will have the opportunity to talk about it on 'Talk 1230.'"

Shortly after the station announced the pending format change, a small group of people formed Ohio Majority Radio, an eventually unsuccessful grassroots attempt to save the progressive radio format on 1230 AM. Competing station WVKO (1580 AM) eventually changed formats, and picked up much of the former WTPG schedule for a brief time before switching to a religious format.

On January 26, 2009, WYTS dropped the conservative talk format and became the Columbus affiliate for Fox Sports Radio. WYTS will carry the full FSR schedule (with the exception of 9 a.m. – noon, when a replay of the Steve Czaban Show will air instead of The Dan Patrick Show, which aired on WTDA) and will hold on to The Jim Rome Show. After WTDA dropped its talk format and Patrick's show in late December 2009, WYTS picked Patrick's show live.

On February 21, 2017, WYTS and W287CP flipped to Urban AC as "Vibe 105.3". The change comes as the sports format was made irrelevant due to sister station WXZX flipping to a similar format the previous November. Michael Eiland, assistant program director and middayer of sister WODC, will host mornings on Vibe. The remainder of the day will feature Premium Choice hosts including WVAZ afternoon host Joe Soto in middays and WSOL-FM midday host Jo-Jo in afternoons.

On March 28, 2017, just over a month after the flip to "Vibe", WYTS and W287CP rebranded as "Kiss 105.3". The change was likely due to a conflict with similarly branded "Vibe Radio HD" on WCVO-HD2.

On November 29, 2017, WYTS flipped to a classic hip-hop format. The change occurred as former similarly formatted WBMO flipped to a simulcast of WCKX the day prior.

On October 2, 2020, WYTS flipped to all-news, joining iHeart's "Black Information Network". The classic hip hop format continues on the 105.3 translator, relayed by WZCB's HD2 sub-channel.

== Previous logo ==
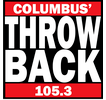
