= WXZX =

Radio station in Columbus, Ohio

- Hilliard, Ohio; United States
- Broadcast area: Columbus metro area
- Frequency: 105.7 MHz (HD Radio)
- Branding: Columbus Alternative 105.7

Programming
- Format: Alternative rock
- Subchannels: HD2: Pride Radio
- Affiliations: Cincinnati Bengals Radio Network; Premiere Networks; United Stations Radio Networks; Columbus Crew

Ownership
- Owner: iHeartMedia; (iHM Licenses, LLC)
- Sister stations: WCOL-FM, WNCI, WODC, WTVN, WYTS, WZCB

History
- First air date: July 20, 1990
- Former call signs: WNRJ (1990–1991); WWHT (1991–1994); WAKS (1994–1997); WHQK (1997–1998); WKFX (1998); WZAZ-FM (1998–2000); WFJX (2000–2005); WBWR (2005–2015); WXZX (2015–2024); WWCD (2024)

Technical information
- Licensing authority: FCC
- Facility ID: 64716
- Class: A
- ERP: 2,400 watts
- HAAT: 159 meters (522 ft)
- Transmitter coordinates: 39°58′10.00″N 83°0′10.00″W

Links
- Public license information: Public file; LMS
- Webcast: Listen live (via iHeartRadio)
- Website: alt1057.iheart.com

WXZX (105.7 FM) is a commercial radio station licensed to Hilliard, Ohio, United States, and serves the Columbus metropolitan area. Owned by iHeartMedia, the station broadcasts an alternative rock format. Both the WXZX studios and the station transmitter are located in Downtown Columbus. The station is the Columbus affiliate of the Cincinnati Bengals Radio Network. WXZX broadcasts in HD Radio.

== History ==
A new station was constructed in Marysville, Ohio, at 105.7 MHz in early 1990, known as WNRJ. The call letters signified "energy", as "Energy 105.7" was originally considered as a brand but never used. When the station finally signed on the air on July 20, 1990, it was known as "The Power Pig" (not to be confused with Tampa, Florida's WFLZ's "The Power Pig" name) and featured a contemporary hit radio format. This short-lived format quickly evolved to rhythmic contemporary as WWHT, "Hot 105". In March 1993, sister station WTLT (107.1 FM) in Circleville began simulcasting WWHT's signal and changed its call sign to WAHC. Together the two stations were branded as "Hot 105/Hot 107" and served the entire Columbus market.

In an effort to again re-image the station, in early 1994 WWHT was changed to WAKS, "105.7 Kiss-FM", playing mainstream hits with a more adult lean. Kiss-FM failed to become a viable competitor to top 40 leader WNCI due to WAKS' relatively poor signal and undifferentiated format. The next format change in April of that year saw WAKS and WAHC flip to all-1970s oldies as "Arrow 105.7". The first song on Arrow was "Stayin' Alive" by the Bee Gees.

The late 1990s saw frequent changes at the station. In December 1996, Jacor Communications purchased WAKS and WAHC for approximately $9.5 million. The new owner flipped the station to country music the following month as WHQK, "Kicks Country 105-7", ending the simulcast with WAHC. WHQK dropped its programming in April 1997 after only a few months in favor of simulcasting WHOK-FM's country format. (Prior to the Jacor purchase, in late 1996 WAKS and WAHC stunted as simulcasts of WLLD (Country 98-9) in an attempt to "surround" leading country station WCOL-FM (92.3 FM). A third format change came late in 1997 when the station gave all-1970s another try; it was branded "105.7 The Chicken" in reference to its mascot, a giant whole broiled chicken dressed in seasonal clothing. Also late in the year, after a day of stunting with Ohio State University themes, WHQK flipped to urban adult contemporary. Urban programming lasted until 1998, when modern rock-formatted WZAZ-FM (then located at 98.9 FM) swapped formats and call signs with WHQK. WZAZ-FM, now on 105.7 FM, was rebranded as "Channel Z 105.7" with a modern rock format.

On June 6, 2000, WZAZ-FM relocated its transmitter closer to Columbus and became WFJX, a classic rock outlet branded "The Fox". A listeners petition to "Bring Back Channel Z" was started after the station switched to 1970s and 1980s rock, but nothing materialized from this effort. Although many liked the music variety played by "Channel Z", it was not competitive in the ratings with Grove City's alternative station, WWCD. On September 19, 2005, after a week of stunting again (this time with episodes of the TV series Cheers), The Fox relaunched as WBWR, "The Brew @ 105.7". Later that year, WBWR began broadcasting in HD Radio.

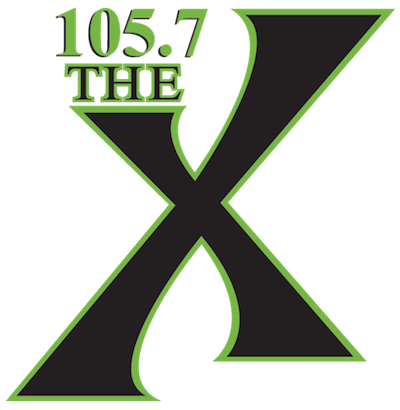
Logo for WXZX as 105.7 The X from 2014 to 2016.

On December 1, 2014, at noon, after playing "Heard It on the X" by ZZ Top (a clever reference to the station's future format), WBWR dropped the "Brew" format and began stunting with music by the Ohio State University Marching Band. At 3 p.m., WBWR flipped to gold-leaning alternative rock as 105.7 The X, bringing back the former name and branding of sister station WCGX (106.7 FM) after it dropped the format two months earlier; a modern rock format branded as "X" aired on WBWR's HD2 digital subchannel in the interim. The first song on The X was "Gold on the Ceiling" by Akron-based band The Black Keys. On July 8, 2015, WBWR changed its call letters to WXZX to match the new branding.

On November 21, 2016, at 3 p.m., after briefly stunting with audio from past Ohio State–Michigan football games (as the next rivalry game was set for the following Saturday, November 26), WXZX flipped to sports radio as "105.7 The Zone".

On February 8, 2019, WXZX returned to its previous classic rock format and The Brew branding. By that July, the station shifted to mainstream rock. On March 16, 2020, WXZX began airing Rover's Morning Glory from sister station WMMS/Cleveland.

On November 16, 2020, WXZX returned to modern rock as Columbus Alternative 105.7, returning the format to terrestrial radio after WWCD flipped to Regional Mexican in early November after being taken over by Urban One. On November 21, WWCD returned to terrestrial radio on the former WMYC, giving Columbus two alternative rock stations.

The station changed its call sign to WWCD on February 12, 2024, but then changed back to WXZX a week later. The station has since become the flagship station for the Columbus Crew.

== HD Radio ==
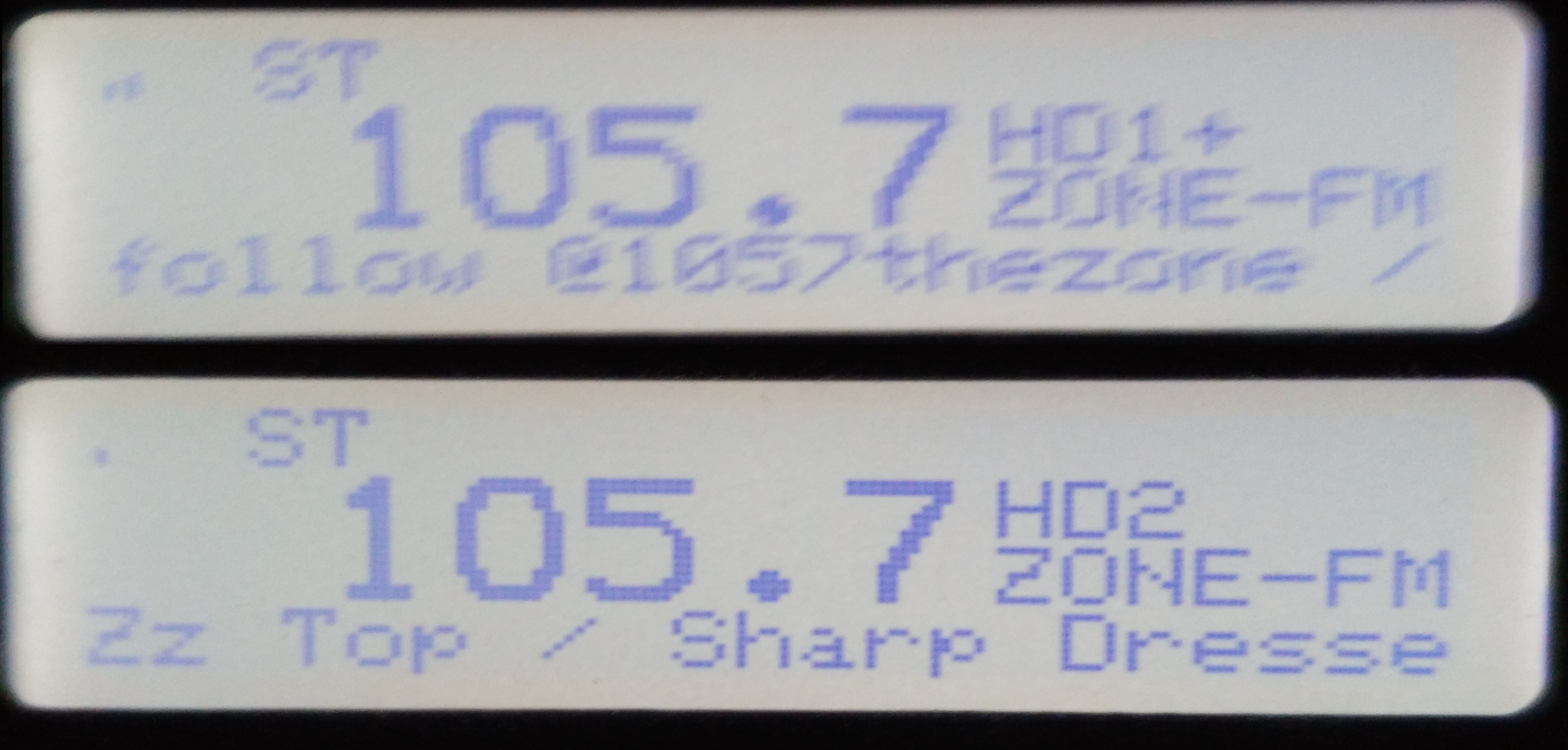
WXZX's HD Radio Channels with former format "The Zone" on a SPARC Radio with PSD.

WXZX broadcasts in HD Radio with two subchannels:

- WXZX-HD1 is a digital simulcast of the analog signal.
- WXZX-HD2 airs "Gen X Radio", a commercial-free channel from the iHeartRadio streaming radio platform that features hits from the 1980s and 1990s. The HD2 subchannel serves as the originating station for this service.
