= WGAR =

WGAR may refer to:

- WGAR-FM, a radio station (99.5 FM) licensed to Cleveland, Ohio, United States, which has carried the WGAR-FM callsign twice (1952–70, 1984–present)
- WHKW, a radio station (1220 AM) licensed to Cleveland, Ohio, United States, which carried the WGAR callsign from 1930 to 1990
