= WSRW (AM) =

- Hillsboro, Ohio; United States
- Broadcast area: Hillsboro; Wilmington; Chillicothe; Washington Court House
- Frequency: 1590 kHz
- Branding: WSRW 101.5

Programming
- Format: Classic hits
- Affiliations: Cincinnati Bengals Radio Network; Premiere Radio Networks; Ohio State Sports Network

Ownership
- Owner: iHeartMedia, Inc.; (iHM Licenses, LLC)
- Sister stations: WBEX, WCHI, WCHO, WCHO-FM, WKKJ, WQLX

History
- First air date: July 17, 1956
- Call sign meaning: Serena Rose Winslow, daughter of station founder David Winslow

Technical information
- Licensing authority: FCC
- Facility ID: 65700
- Class: D
- Power: 500 watts day 25 watts night
- Transmitter coordinates: 39°09′58″N 83°36′25″W
- Translator: 101.5 W268CC (Hillsboro)

Links
- Public license information: Public file; LMS
- Webcast: Listen live (via iHeartRadio)
- Website: wsrw.iheart.com

WSRW (1590 kHz) is an AM radio station broadcasting a classic hits format. Licensed to Hillsboro, Ohio, United States, WSRW is branded as "WSRW 101.5," utilizing the frequency of their FM translator, W268CC (101.5 FM), also licensed to Hillsboro. WSRW, also known as The Highland Broadcasting Company, was owned and operated by Thomas and Susan Archibald for over 43 years, and eventually sold in 2000. The station is currently owned by iHeartMedia, Inc. and features programming from their Premium Choice network and Premiere Radio Networks.

Prior to December 26, 2015, WSRW operated as a full-time simulcast of WCHO-FM as "Buckeye Country 105.5."

Willard Parr - then a sergeant with the Hillsboro police department - joined WSRW as it was still being built in January 1956, and was the first voice heard as the station began broadcasting that July 17.

Previous logo

Cleveland-area radio broadcaster Chuck Collier, a Hillsboro native, began his broadcast career at WSRW. Collier later voice-tracked for WSRW's previous classic country format before his death in October 2011.

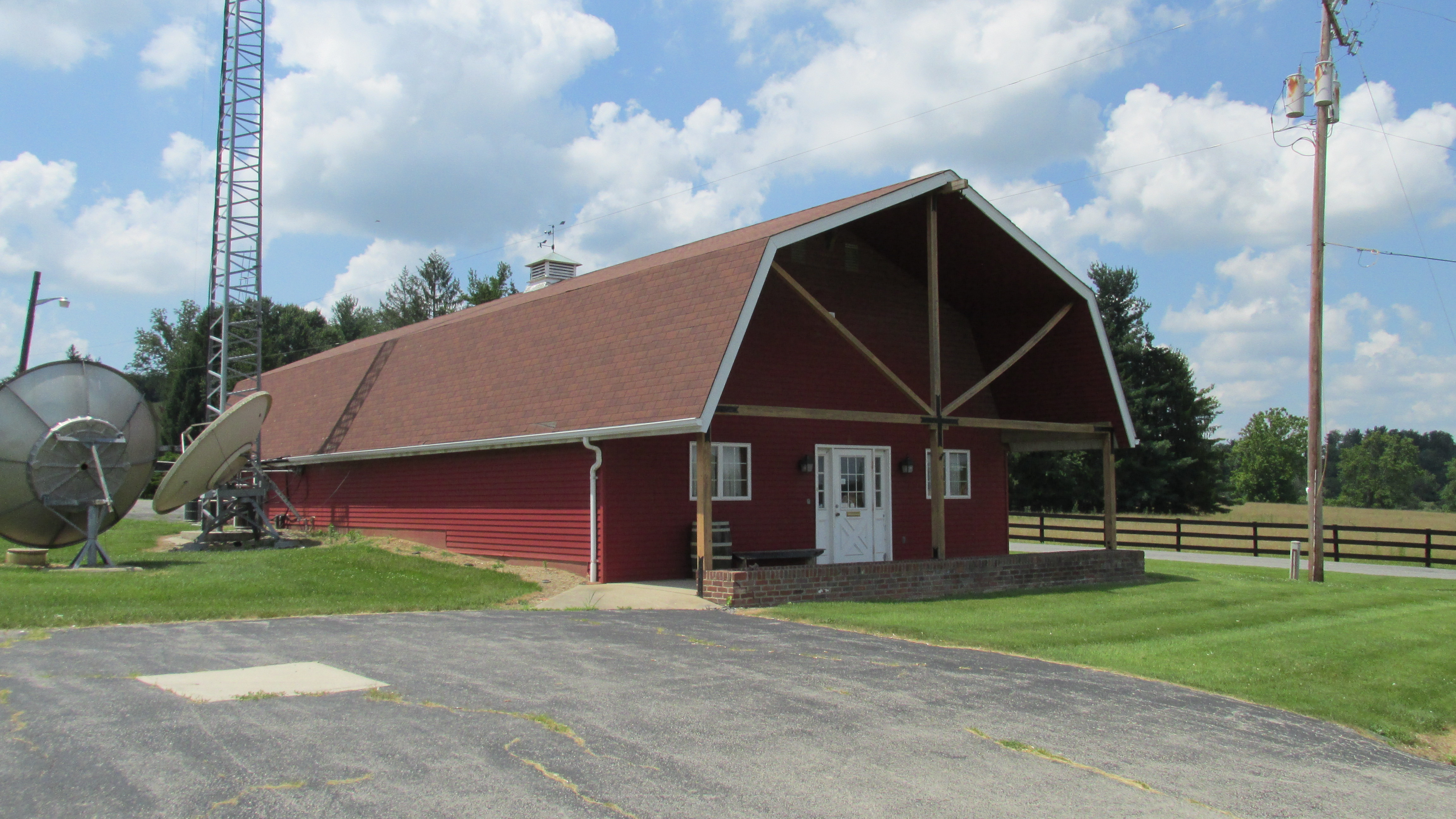
WSRW radio station located south of Hillsboro, Ohio. Once nicknamed "The Little Red Barn".

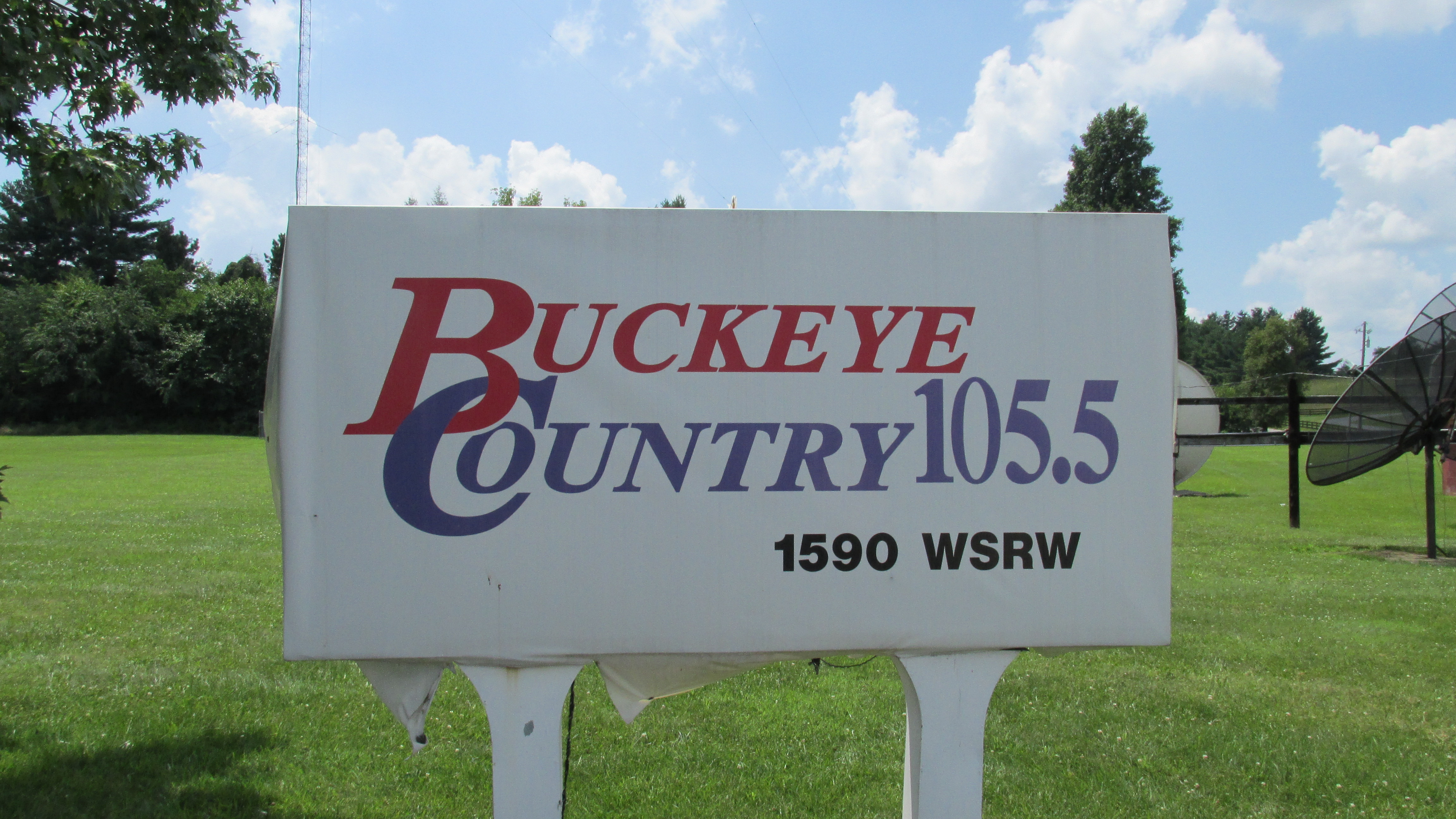
Buckeye Country 105.5 FM (1590 AM) sign at WSRW.
