= WKKJ =

- Chillicothe, Ohio; United States
- Frequency: 94.3 MHz
- Branding: 94 Country

Programming
- Format: Country music
- Affiliations: Agri Broadcast Network

Ownership
- Owner: iHeartMedia, Inc.; (iHM Licenses, LLC)
- Sister stations: WBEX, WCHI, WCHO, WCHO-FM, WQLX, WSRW

History
- First air date: December 22, 1978
- Former call signs: WFCB (1978–2002)

Technical information
- Licensing authority: FCC
- Facility ID: 74224
- Class: B1
- ERP: 19,000 watts
- HAAT: 107.6 meters (353 ft)
- Transmitter coordinates: 39°19′52.00″N 82°59′49.00″W

Links
- Public license information: Public file; LMS
- Webcast: Listen live (via iHeartRadio)
- Website: wkkj.iheart.com

WKKJ (94.3 FM) is a radio station broadcasting a country music format. Licensed to Chillicothe, Ohio, United States. The station is owned by iHeartMedia, Inc. and features local news and high school sports with agricultural news from ABN Radio.

== History ==
On December 22, 1978, WFCB signed on the air. It was owned by Terins Enterprises and was powered at only 3,000 watts. It could only be heard in Chillicothe and nearby communities. In 1989, it was acquired by the Wyandot Radio Corporation, which also owned WCHI.

When Clear Channel Communications acquired WFCB, it switched the format to oldies.

In 2002, co-owned WKKJ (93.3 FM) was moved to the more lucrative Columbus media market, 50 miles north of Chillicothe, with Ashville as the new city of license. In order to clear this move from Chillicothe to Ashville, WFCB changed call letters to WKKJ, assumed the country music format heard on the previous WKKJ, and reassigned all on- and off-air personnel, effectively becoming the successor station to the previous WKKJ.

After the switch, WKKJ was re-imaged as "94 Country".
