= Bob Conners =

American radio personality

- Born: Robert Foster Charles Conners; December 12, 1933; Clearfield, Pennsylvania, U.S.
- Died: November 23, 2014 (aged 80); Marco Island, Florida, U.S.
- Education: Ohio State University
- Spouse: Linda Conners
- Children: 4
- Presenting career
- Show: Bob Conners in the Morning (1978–2011)
- Stations: WTVN-AM, Columbus, Ohio
- Show: BC's Saturday Morning Open Phones
- Stations: WTVN-AM, Columbus, Ohio
- Style: Morning radio

Robert Foster Charles Conners (December 12, 1933 – November 23, 2014), known professionally as Bob Conners, was an American radio personality on Columbus, Ohio's AM radio station 610 WTVN. On his retirement in 2011, he had been on the air in Columbus for over forty years, 33 of them as WTVN morning show host. In total, his broadcasting career lasted more than 60 years.

== Early life ==
Conners was born in Clearfield, Pennsylvania on December 12, 1933, to Robert Charles and Zona (née Foster) Conners. He graduated from St. Marys Central Catholic High School in St. Marys, Pennsylvania in 1952.

== Career ==
Conners began his broadcasting work while in high school at WKBI in St. Marys and continued at WJET in Erie, Pennsylvania. He served in the United States Army from 1956 to 1958, then resumed broadcasting roles at KSON and KDEO in San Diego, California, and WEEP in Pittsburgh, Pennsylvania. He began his career at WTVN in 1964 after moving to Columbus from Pittsburgh. After a three-year interlude as the afternoon presenter at WBNS-AM in Columbus from 1973 to 1976, he returned to WTVN where he was named morning show host in 1978.

=== Bob Conners in the Morning ===
Prior to Conners' 2011 retirement, Bob Conners in the Morning aired weekday mornings from 5:35 a.m. to 9 a.m. His show had been a mainstay of Columbus radio since 1979. The show interspersed news, weather, and traffic reports between segments discussing issues of varied interest, as well as interviews with authors and local personalities.

=== BC's Saturday Morning Open Phones ===
On BC's Saturday Morning Open Phones, callers could speak about any topic, whether a simple announcement of a charity event or a minutes-long political rant. There were several regular callers who bantered with Conners over politics or the latest Ohio State University football game. BC's Saturday Morning Open Phones aired Saturdays on WTVN from 6:00 a.m. to 10:00 a.m.

During the last several years of his WTVN career, Conners performed his show during the winter months remotely from a studio installed in his second home in Marco Island, Florida.

== Personal life ==
According to his obituary, Conners had a lifelong interest in aviation and was an instrument-rated pilot. He earned his bachelor's degree in Aviation and Communications from Ohio State University in 1986. He was a member of the Commemorative Air Force and served as announcer for many air shows at Rickenbacker Air National Guard Base near Columbus.

== Retirement and death ==
On October 24, 2011, Conners announced that he would be retiring and his last official day on-air would be November 30, 2011.

His retirement was marked by a statement on the floor of the US Congress by Representative Pat Tiberi of Ohio's 12th Congressional District. At the time he indicated he planned to continue to live with his family in the Eastmoor neighborhood of Columbus most of the year.

On November 24, 2014, the station announced Conners' death of mantle cell lymphoma at his winter home in Marco Island the previous day at the age of 80. He was survived by his wife of 37 years, Linda, and four children, 13 grandchildren and 3 great-grandchildren.
