= WMRN (AM) =

- Marion, Ohio; United States
- Broadcast area: Mid-Ohio
- Frequency: 1490 kHz
- Branding: NewsRadio 1490 WMRN

Programming
- Format: Conservative talk
- Network: Fox News Radio
- Affiliations: Premiere Networks

Ownership
- Owner: iHeartMedia, Inc.; (iHM Licenses, LLC)
- Sister stations: WMRN-FM, WYNT

History
- First air date: December 23, 1940
- Former frequencies: 1500 kHz (1940–1941)
- Call sign meaning: Marion

Technical information
- Licensing authority: FCC
- Facility ID: 40169
- Class: C
- Power: 1,000 watts
- Transmitter coordinates: 40°36′50.00″N 83°7′47.00″W

Links
- Public license information: Public file; LMS
- Webcast: Listen live (via iHeartRadio)
- Website: wmrn.iheart.com

WMRN (1490 AM) is a commercial radio station licensed to Marion, Ohio, and featuring a conservative talk radio format. Owned by iHeartMedia, Inc., WMRN's studios and transmitter are co-located on the city's northern end. In addition to a standard analog transmission, WMRN is available online via iHeartRadio.

Former logo

== History ==
WMRN (1490 AM) signed on the air on December 23, 1940, becoming the first radio station licensed to broadcast from Marion, Ohio.

The station was established by the Marion Broadcasting Company, with Robert T. Mason of Fremont, Ohio, serving as president and treasurer. Mason brought prior experience in broadcasting, publishing, and national news organizations and directed the creation of WMRN as a fully licensed commercial station rather than an experimental or temporary operation. The Federal Communications Commission (FCC) granted a construction permit in mid-1940, authorizing the construction of the station’s facilities and the commencement of test broadcasts.

Construction of WMRN’s studios and transmitter facilities took place along North Main Street, just north of the Marion city limits. The station was originally authorized to operate with 250 watts of power on a frequency of 1500 kilocycles, with a projected service radius of approximately 25 miles. Test broadcasts were conducted in early December 1940 while final FCC approval was pending.

Final authorization was received shortly after noon on December 23, 1940. WMRN’s first regular broadcast aired at 1:15 p.m. that day, with announced operating hours of 7:00 a.m. to 10:00 p.m. daily. The station was promoted as Marion’s first locally based radio service.

In March 1941, as part of the North American Regional Broadcasting Agreement (NARBA), WMRN’s frequency was reassigned from 1500 kilocycles to 1490 kilocycles, where it has remained since.

During its early years, WMRN was affiliated with the ABC Radio Network, carrying network dramas, comedies, news, and sports programming during the Golden Age of Radio. As network entertainment programming shifted from radio to television in the 1950s, WMRN transitioned to a full-service, middle-of-the-road format featuring adult popular music, local news, and sports, and adopted the on-air branding “Hometown Radio 1490.”

WMRN expanded into FM broadcasting in the early 1950s. WMRN-FM began broadcasting on May 6, 1953, at 6:30 a.m., operating on 106.9 MHz (FM channel 295). The FM station initially simulcast WMRN’s AM programming. During the 1960s, WMRN-FM adopted an automated beautiful music format before changing to country music on April 1, 1981. The station later moved to 94.3 MHz in 2008.

By the late 1980s, WMRN’s weekday schedule consisted primarily of locally produced talk programming, supplemented by nationally syndicated shows such as The Rush Limbaugh Show. Remaining non-religious music programming, largely limited to weekend oldies shows, was eliminated by 1999.

WMRN and WMRN-FM were acquired by Jacor Communications in the 1990s. Jacor later merged into Clear Channel Communications, which subsequently became iHeartMedia. Under corporate ownership, WMRN’s traditional full-service format with extensive locally produced programming was gradually reduced, with syndicated talk programming filling much of the weekday schedule.

Since the retirement of longtime local morning host Jeff Ruth in June 2019, WMRN has not aired regularly scheduled locally produced weekday programming, with the exception of local newscasts.

== Programming ==
WMRN's entire broadcast lineup is syndicated with programming sourced mostly from co-owned Premiere Networks and Compass Media Networks. The station also is an affiliate of the Cleveland Guardians Radio Network, the Ohio State Sports Network, the Columbus Blue Jackets Radio Network, and the Ohio High School Athletic Association (OHSAA) Radio Network. WMRN also broadcasts local high school football games in the fall and local high school basketball games in the winter.
