= Nationwide Communications =

American media company

Nationwide Communications, Inc.

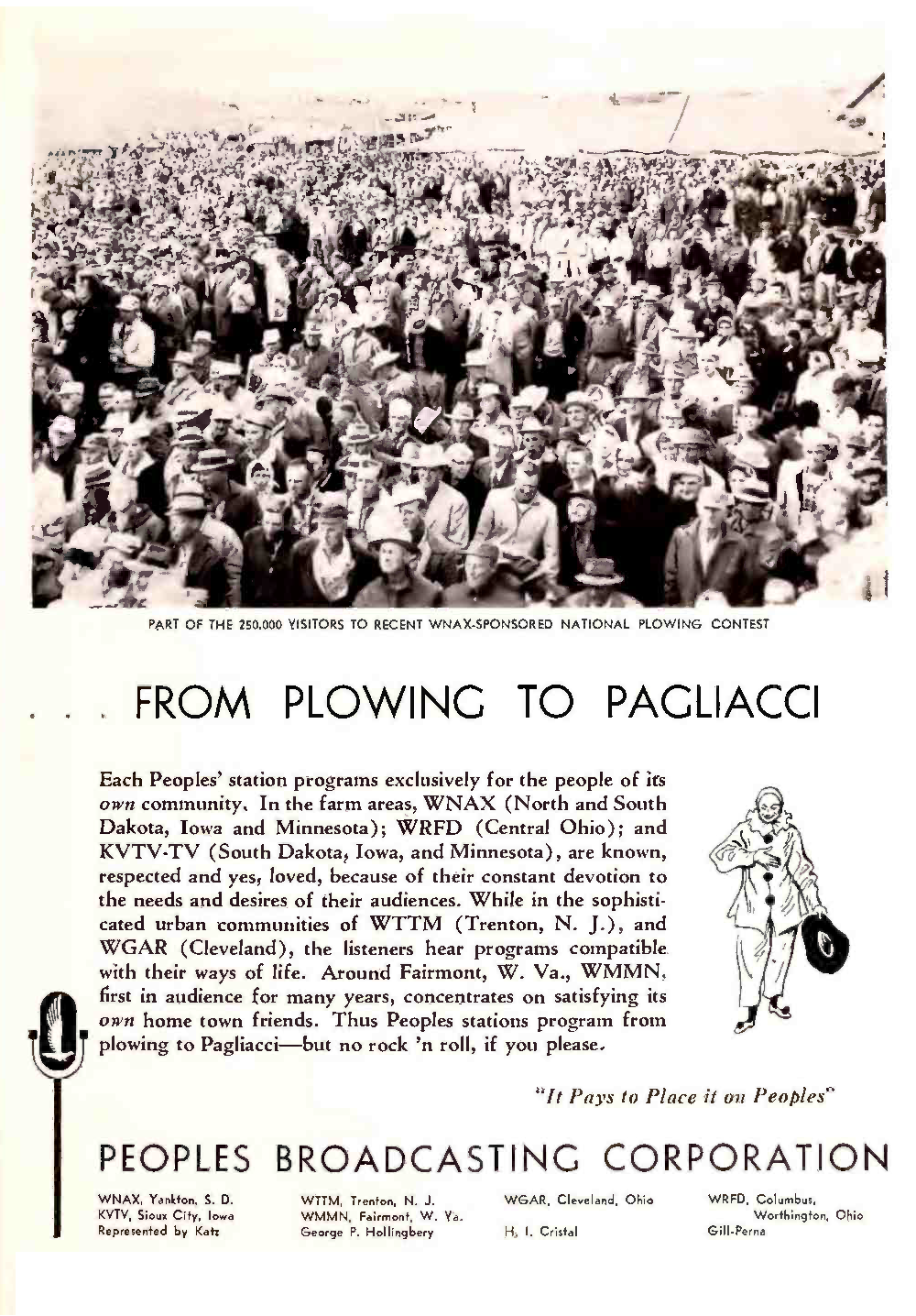
- 1960 advertisement for Peoples Broadcasting Corporation, later known as Nationwide Communications Corporation, a subsidiary of the Nationwide Mutual Insurance Co. (Note the Nationwide "eagle" logo inside the Peoples microphone logo)
- Company type: Subsidiary
- Industry: Broadcasting
- Founded: 1946
- Defunct: 1998
- Successors: Jacor; iHeartMedia; Young Broadcasting; Nexstar Media Group
- Headquarters: Columbus, Ohio, United States
- Area served: United States
- Parent: Nationwide Mutual Insurance Company

Nationwide Communications Inc., originally known as Peoples Broadcasting Corporation, was a media subsidiary of the Nationwide Insurance Company, which operated from 1946 until 1997. Based in Columbus, Ohio, Nationwide Communications owned and operated a variety of radio and television stations across the United States until it sold off all its radio stations to Cincinnati-based Jacor for a reported $620 million, and its television stations to Young Broadcasting. The service division was spun off and became Nationwide Communications Services L.L.C. in 1998.

In 1946, the Ohio Farm Bureau Federation first got into broadcasting through a radio service for farmers on WRFD, Columbus, Ohio, an AM radio station. The Ohio Farm Bureau was dedicated to serving farmers in Ohio, but as its other pursuits (chiefly the Farm Bureau Mutual Automobile Insurance Company) were increasingly made available to non-farmers, the Farm Bureau spun off these ventures into a separate corporation. WRFD continued to serve farmers, and indeed, still carries farm programming today under the ownership of Salem Media of Ohio. However, other Farm Bureau stations—most notably WRFD-FM, now known as WNCI—were transferred to this umbrella corporation, known today as the Nationwide Mutual Insurance Company & Affiliated Companies. The group of stations became known as Nationwide Communications, after its parent company.

Nationwide Communications owned a total of five television stations, though none in its home market of Columbus, or Ohio. The first television station it owned was KVTV-TV (now KCAU-TV) in Sioux City, Iowa, which was sold in 1965 to purchase WATE-TV, Channel 6, Knoxville, Tennessee. The company's second purchase was WXEX-TV (now WRIC-TV), Channel 8, Petersburg, Virginia in 1968, its third station was WBAY-TV, Channel 2, Green Bay, Wisconsin, purchased in 1974, and its fourth station purchase was KITN (now WFTC), Channel 29, in Minneapolis in 1985. Three of the four stations were ABC affiliates (WXEX-TV switched from NBC to ABC in 1965, WATE-TV switched from NBC to ABC in 1979, and WBAY-TV switched from CBS to ABC in 1992); the fourth (KITN/WFTC) was an independent and later a Fox affiliate while under Nationwide's stewardship. Nationwide Communications sold all three of its ABC-affiliated television stations in 1993 to Young Broadcasting, a subsidiary of Adam Young, Incorporated, a TV station advertising representation firm; WFTC was sold to Clear Channel Communications the next year. In November 2013, Young merged with Media General, and then itself was merged with Nexstar Media Group in January 2017. WATE and WRIC are now under that company's ownership, while WBAY was spun-off to Gray Television.

In 1967, Peoples received a construction permit for channel 47 in Columbus, Ohio. The station was designated WNCI-TV. After disputes over tower siting, the allocation was changed to channel 28. Nationwide opted not to construct WNCI-TV in light of a pending rulemaking at the FCC that proposed limiting one company to owning one television station, one radio station, or one newspaper in a market. Nationwide, which already owned AM and FM stations in Columbus, was unsuccessful in an attempt to sell the TV permit.

Before ceasing operations, Nationwide Communications was the 16th-largest radio group in the United States. Throughout its history, Nationwide owned and operated radio stations in Minnesota, Florida, Ohio, Nevada, Texas, Arizona, Maryland, North Carolina, Virginia, Washington and California.

== List of former assets ==
All stations are arranged alphabetically by state and by city of license.

- (**) – Indicates a station that was built and signed-on by Nationwide Communications or predecessor Peoples Broadcasting Corporation.

=== Radio stations ===
AM Station	FM Station

City of license / Market	Station	Years owned	Current status
Phoenix, AZ	KCHT/KHTC/KGLQ 96.9	1995–1998	KMXP, owned by iHeartMedia
Phoenix, AZ	KZZP-FM/KVRY 104.7	1985–1998	KZZP, owned by iHeartMedia
Tucson, AZ	KNST 940	1985–1993	KGMS, owned by Robert and Luann Wilkins
Tucson, AZ	KRQQ 93.7	1985–1993	Owned by iHeartMedia
Sacramento, CA	KZAP/KNCI 98.5	1985–1994	KRXQ, owned by Audacy, Inc.
San Diego, CA	KCEO 1000	1996–1997	Owned by Immaculate Heart Radio
San Diego, CA	KFSD-FM/KXGL 94.1	1996–1998	KMYI, owned by iHeartMedia
San Diego, CA	KUPR/KMCG 95.7	1996–1998	KSSX, owned by iHeartMedia
San Jose, CA	KWSS 94.5	1985–1991	KBAY, owned by Alpha Media
Orlando, FL	WZKD 950	1982–1983	WORL, owned by Salem Media Group
Orlando, FL	WBJW-FM 105.1	1982–1996	WOMX-FM, owned by Audacy, Inc.
Winter Park, FL	WBJW-AM 1140	1982–1986	WPRD, owned by J & V Communications, Inc.
Des Moines, IA	KSO/KGGO/KDMI 1460	1980s–1990s	KXNO, owned by iHeartMedia
Baltimore, MD	WPOC 93.1	1974–1998	Owned by iHeartMedia
Minneapolis–St. Paul, MN	KMJZ/KSGS 950	1995–1998	KTNF, owned by JR Broadcasting
Minneapolis–St. Paul, MN	KMJZ-FM 104.1	1995–1998	KZJK, owned by Audacy, Inc.
Las Vegas–Henderson, NV	KMJJ/KZAP/KXNO 1140	1985–1996	Defunct, ceased operations in 2023 as KXST
Las Vegas–Henderson, NV	KLUC-FM 98.5	1985–1995	Owned by Audacy, Inc.
Greensboro–Winston-Salem–High Point, NC	WKZL 107.5	1981–1991	Owned by Dick Broadcasting
Cleveland, OH	WGAR 1220	1953–1990	WHKW, owned by Salem Media Group
Cleveland, OH	WNCR/WKSW/WGAR-FM 99.5	1953–1998	Owned by iHeartMedia
Cleveland, OH	WMMS 100.7	1996–1998	Owned by iHeartMedia
Cleveland, OH	WMJI 105.7	1996–1998	Owned by iHeartMedia
Columbus, OH	WRFD 880 **	1947–1974	Owned by Salem Media Group
Columbus, OH	WCOL/WFII 1230	1994–1998	WYTS, owned by iHeartMedia
Columbus, OH	WCOL-FM 92.3	1994–1998	Owned by iHeartMedia
Columbus, OH	WRFD-FM/WNCI 97.9 **	1961–1998	Owned by iHeartMedia
Dallas–Fort Worth, TX	KEGL 97.1	1996–1998	Owned by iHeartMedia
Dallas–Fort Worth, TX	KDMX 102.9	1991–1998	Owned by iHeartMedia
Houston–Galveston, TX	KLEF 94.5	1970s	KTBZ-FM, owned by iHeartMedia
Houston–Galveston, TX	KHMX 96.5	1989–1998	Owned by Audacy, Inc.
Petersburg–Richmond, VA	WLEE 1480	1968–1983	Defunct, ceased operations in 1988
Seattle–Tacoma, WA	KISW 99.9	1987–1996	Owned by Audacy, Inc.

=== Television stations ===
City of license / Market	Station	Channel	Years owned	Current status
Sioux City, IA	KVTV **	9	1957–1965	ABC affiliate KCAU-TV, owned by Nexstar Media Group
Minneapolis–St. Paul, MN	KITN-TV	29	1985–1993	MyNetworkTV affiliate WFTC, owned by Fox Television Stations
Knoxville, TN	WATE-TV	6	1965–1994	ABC affiliate owned by Nexstar Media Group
Richmond, VA	WXEX-TV/WRIC-TV	8	1967–1994	ABC affiliate owned by Nexstar Media Group
Green Bay, WI	WBAY-TV	2	1974–1994	ABC affiliate owned by Gray Media
