= WCHI (AM) =

Radio station in Chillicothe, Ohio

- Chillicothe, Ohio; United States
- Broadcast area: Chillicothe; Washington Court House; Wilmington; Hillsboro
- Frequency: 1350 kHz
- Branding: Easy 1350

Programming
- Format: Soft adult contemporary
- Affiliations: Cleveland Cavaliers Radio Network

Ownership
- Owner: iHeartMedia, Inc.; (iHM Licenses, LLC)
- Sister stations: WBEX, WCHO, WCHO-FM WKKJ, WQLX, WSRW

History
- First air date: July 8, 1956
- Call sign meaning: Chillicothe

Technical information
- Licensing authority: FCC
- Facility ID: 74225
- Class: D
- Power: 1,000 watts day; 28 watts night
- Transmitter coordinates: 39°19′16.23″N 82°57′8.64″W

Links
- Public license information: Public file; LMS
- Webcast: Listen live (via iHeartRadio)
- Website: easy1350.iheart.com

WCHI (1350 AM) is a radio station broadcasting a soft adult contemporary format. Licensed to Chillicothe, Ohio, United States. The station is currently owned by iHeartMedia, Inc.

== History ==
The call letters WCHI originally belonged to a radio station in the Chicago, Illinois, area. On October 30, 1931, that station was ordered to go off the air.

The station began broadcasting on July 8, 1956, on 1350 kHz and with 1000 watts of power.

On November 12, 2012, WCHI changed its format from oldies to comedy. On June 4, 2014, WCHI changed its format to soft adult contemporary, branded as "EZ 1350".
