= WBEX =

Radio station in Chillicothe, Ohio

- Chillicothe, Ohio; United States
- Broadcast area: Ross County
- Frequency: 1490 kHz
- Branding: Newsradio 92.7 WBEX

Programming
- Format: Talk radio; Sports radio
- Affiliations: Fox News Radio; Fox Sports Radio; Premiere Networks

Ownership
- Owner: iHeartMedia, Inc.; (iHM Licenses, LLC)
- Sister stations: WCHI, WCHO, WCHO-FM, WKKJ, WQLX, WSRW

History
- First air date: September 15, 1947

Technical information
- Licensing authority: FCC
- Facility ID: 52041
- Class: C
- Power: 1,000 watts (unlimited)
- Transmitter coordinates: 39°19′52″N 82°59′49″W
- Translator: 92.7 W224BR (Chillicothe)

Links
- Public license information: Public file; LMS
- Webcast: Listen live (via iHeartRadio)
- Website: wbex.iheart.com

WBEX (1490 kHz) is a commercial radio station broadcasting a Talk and Sports radio format. It is licensed to Chillicothe, Ohio, and is owned by iHeartMedia, Inc.

WBEX is a Class C radio station. It is powered at 1,000 watts non-directional. Programming is also heard on FM translator W224BR at 92.7 MHz in Chillicothe.

== Programming ==
In the daytime and overnight, WBEX has a talk radio format. But in the evening and on weekends it switches to sports programming. Weekdays begin with This Morning, America's First News with Gordon Deal. That's followed by The Glenn Beck Radio Program, The Clay Travis and Buck Sexton Show and The Sean Hannity Show. Overnight, the station carries Coast to Coast AM with George Noory. Most hours begin with an update from Fox News Radio.

From 6 p.m. to 1 a.m., WBEX switches to sports shows from Fox Sports Radio.

== History ==
The station signed on the air on September 15, 1947.

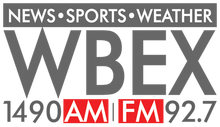
Previous logo
