= WNCI =

Radio station in Columbus, Ohio

- Columbus, Ohio; United States
- Broadcast area: Columbus metro area
- Frequency: 97.9 MHz (HD Radio)
- Branding: WNCI 97.9

Programming
- Format: Contemporary hit radio
- Affiliations: Premiere Networks

Ownership
- Owner: iHeartMedia, Inc.; (iHM Licenses, LLC)
- Sister stations: WCOL-FM, WODC, WTVN, WXZX, WYTS, WZCB

History
- First air date: July 1961
- Former call signs: WRFD-FM (1961–1967)
- Call sign meaning: former flagship of Nationwide Communications, Inc.

Technical information
- Licensing authority: FCC
- Facility ID: 47741
- Class: B
- ERP: 175,000 watts (horiz.); 105,000 watts (vert.)
- HAAT: 171 meters (561 ft)
- Transmitter coordinates: 39°58′10″N 83°0′10″W

Links
- Public license information: Public file; LMS
- Webcast: Listen live (via iHeartRadio)
- Website: wnci.iheart.com

WNCI (97.9 FM) is a commercial radio station licensed to Columbus, Ohio, featuring a top 40 (CHR) format known as "WNCI 97.9". Owned by iHeartMedia, Inc., the station serves the Columbus metropolitan area and is the local affiliate for On Air with Ryan Seacrest. WNCI's studios are on West Fifth Avenue on Columbus' west side, while the transmitter is atop One Nationwide Plaza in the city's downtown. In addition to a standard analog transmission, WNCI broadcasts using HD Radio technology and streams online via iHeartRadio.

The station has an effective radiated power (ERP) of 175,000 watts, while the current maximum for Ohio radio stations is 50,000 watts. It is grandfathered at this power from before the date when the FCC set limits for FM stations. There are only six FM stations in the United States that operate with more power.

== History ==
The station signed on the air as WRFD-FM in July 1961. It had a classical music format, sharing studios with co-owned WRFD, east of Powell, Ohio. In early 1967, management changed the call sign to WNCI-FM to match its corporate ownership, Nationwide Communications, Inc. The call letter switch also marked a change in programming from primarily classical music.

In mid 1968, WNCI began programming "The Young Sound" format, supplied by CBS Radio, mostly vocal-oriented easy listening. In 1972, WNCI moved to the sixth floor of the new Scot's Inn, later the Carousel Inn, at 4900 Sinclair Road. Since that time, the studios of WNCI have been relocated to various places in the Columbus area, including the Nationwide Building, The Continent, Broadcast Lake (a former quarry overlooked by several Clear Channel radio studios and the television studios of WSYX), and the current location at 2323 West Fifth Avenue.

WNCI began its Top 40 programming in 1970, although the station also broadcast an evening "progressive rock" album-based program beginning in the fall of 1969. From 1979 to 1982, the station attempted a full service, adult contemporary music format to compete with WTVN, adding a five-person news staff. Its slogan at the time was "The Best Is At The Center," playing on its location on the FM dial. The full-service format was abandoned in 1982 and the station returned to playing Top 40 hits.

In June 1993, WNCI again morphed into a Hot AC-leaning station to compete with adult contemporary rival WSNY. This lasted for nearly a year before WNCI reverted to a CHR/Pop formatted-direction.

In 1997, Jacor Communications acquired the assets of Nationwide Communications, including WNCI, for $620 million. WNCI was once the flagship station for the 17-station Nationwide Communications, a division of the Nationwide Mutual Insurance Company (where its call letters derive). Jacor was acquired in 1998 by Clear Channel Communications, which today is iHeartMedia, Inc.

WNCI tends to be a mainstream based contemporary hit music radio FM station, at times leaning towards Adult Top 40.

WNCI formerly syndicated their “Dave & Jimmy” morning show to nearby stations through United Stations Radio Networks. As of October 2, 2023, the hosts decided to end syndication of the show, rendering the morning show exclusive to WNCI, although the show is streamed nationally on the iHeartRadio app.
