= WCHO-FM =

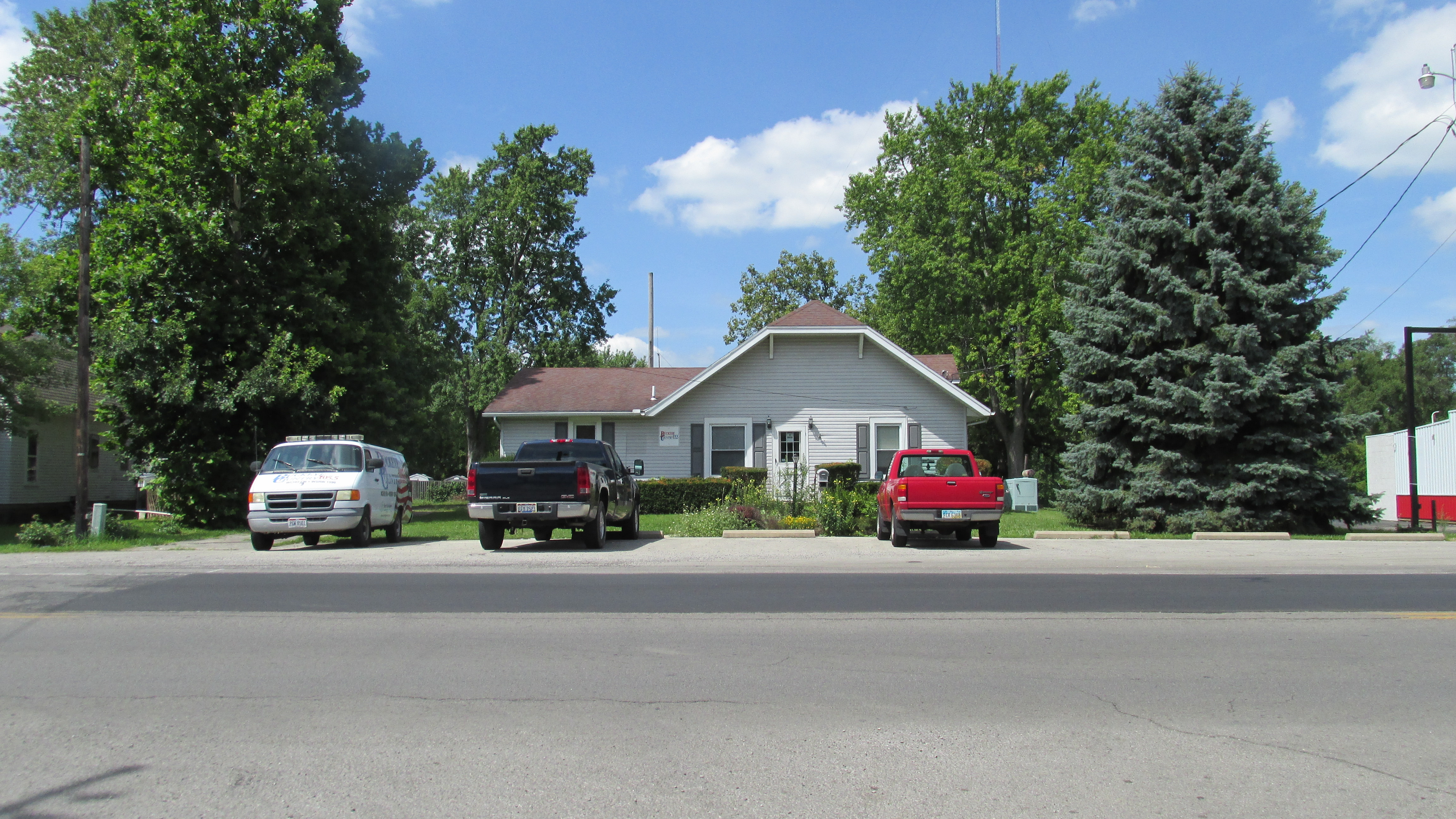
- WCHO's studios on N. North St. in Washington Court House, Ohio
- Washington Court House, Ohio; United States
- Broadcast area: Chillicothe; Washington Court House; Wilmington; Hillsboro
- Frequency: 105.5 MHz
- Branding: Buckeye Country 105.5

Programming
- Format: Country music
- Affiliations: Cincinnati Bengals Radio Network; Westwood One; Agri Broadcast Network; Ohio State Sports Network; Premiere Networks

Ownership
- Owner: iHeartMedia, Inc.; (iHM Licenses, LLC)
- Sister stations: WBEX, WCHI, WCHO, WKKJ, WQLX, WSRW

History
- First air date: December 1968
- Call sign meaning: Washington Court House

Technical information
- Licensing authority: FCC
- Facility ID: 57354
- Class: A
- ERP: 6,000 watts
- HAAT: 100 meters (330 ft)
- Transmitter coordinates: 39°24′1.00″N 83°26′48.00″W

Links
- Public license information: Public file; LMS
- Webcast: Listen live (via iHeartRadio)
- Website: buckeyecountry105.iheart.com

WCHO-FM (105.5 MHz) is a radio station broadcasting a country music format. The station is licensed to Washington Court House, Ohio, in the United States. The station is owned by iHeartMedia, Inc., through licensee iHM Licenses, LLC, and features programming from Westwood One and Premiere Radio Networks, as well as agriculture programming from the Agri Broadcast Network.

Previous logo
