= WCOL-FM =

Radio station in Columbus, Ohio

- Columbus, Ohio; United States
- Broadcast area: Columbus metro area
- Frequency: 92.3 MHz (HD Radio)
- Branding: 92.3 WCOL

Programming
- Format: Country music
- Affiliations: Premiere Networks

Ownership
- Owner: iHeartMedia; (iHM Licenses, LLC)
- Sister stations: WNCI, WODC, WTVN, WXZX, WYTS, WZCB

History
- First air date: 1948
- Former call signs: WCOL-FM (1948–1978); WXGT (1978–1990)
- Call sign meaning: Columbus

Technical information
- Licensing authority: FCC
- Facility ID: 25037
- Class: B
- ERP: 22,000 watts
- HAAT: 230 meters (750 ft)
- Transmitter coordinates: 39°58′16.0″N 83°01′40.0″W

Links
- Public license information: Public file; LMS
- Webcast: Listen live (via iHeartRadio)
- Website: wcol.iheart.com

WCOL-FM (92.3 FM) is a commercial radio station licensed to Columbus, Ohio, United States, serving the Columbus metro area. Owned by IHeartMedia, it features a country format, with studios in Downtown Columbus and transmitter sited northwest of downtown on the WBNS-TV tower. In addition to a standard analog transmission, WCOL-FM broadcasts over HD Radio and streams online via iHeartRadio.

== History ==
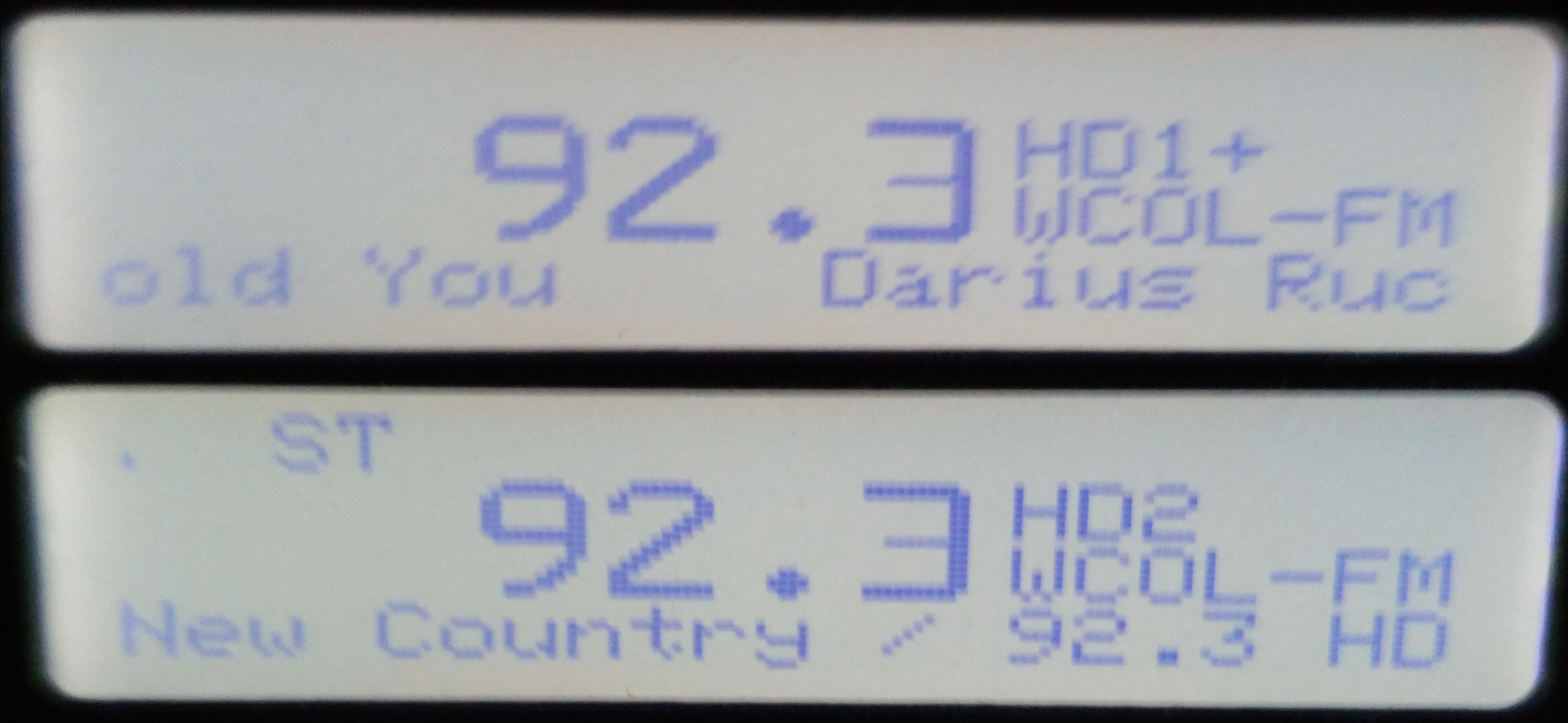
WCOL-FM's HD Radio Channels on a SPARC Radio with PSD.

WCOL-FM first came on the air in 1948. In the early 1970s, it carried religious programming in the daytime and rock music in the evening.

1970 through 1978, WCOL-FM was known as "Stereo Rock 92" and offered programming as an eclectic album-oriented rock (AOR) station, and was moderately popular. The on-air mix included Jazz, soul, country and spoken word recordings and focused on local and regionally recorded music. The programming had the support of management but even after dropping the religious programming and going 24 hour AOR, it was difficult for the station's sales staff to understand, and thus to monetize. Where the station had modest financial success, the cultural impact has been proven over the decades.

And from 1978 and throughout the 1980s, the station used the WXGT call letters and relaunched as "The All New 92X FM, WXGT". When 92X was launched it went to a Top 40/CHR format. During this period then locally famous Suzy Waud hosted evenings; in the latter part of the mid-to-late 1980s, 92X went into a Rock/40 format.

92X launched the careers of several major market disc jockeys during the 1980s, including the late great Joseph "Smokin' Joe" Dawson (later at B96 in Chicago), Gary Spears (also later at B96 and then at KIIS-FM in Los Angeles), Baltazar (who went to WQHT a.k.a. Hot 97 in New York after that, and then he went to WJMN, & now he's on WBQT both in Boston), and Douglas Ritterling, whose on-air name was Doug Ritter (who later went to KITS a.k.a. Live 105 in San Francisco) and Jonny Zellner who went on to run programming at Sirius XM and later at iHeartMedia formerly known as Clear Channel Communications. WXGT dominated the CHR/AOR a.k.a. the Rock/40 hybrid format in Columbus, Ohio during most of the decade.

On November 5, 1990, WXGT changed to oldies as "Cool 92" under the WCOL-FM call letters. When the country format was ushered in on February 14, 1994, the station stunted over the course of several days by broadcasting a computerized numeric countdown.

The WCOL call sign had also been used on an AM band station, which was the area's primary Top 40 station in the 1960s and early 1970s and was branded as "The New WCOL" and "Super 'COL" It briefly returned to its Top 40 roots in the early 1990s simulcasting "Cool 92" and in automated form as "Real Oldies 1230 AM WCOL" from 2003 to 2004. That station is now known as WYTS and is an affiliate of the Fox Sports Radio network.

WCOL-FM is one of two country music outlets in Columbus metro as it faces competition with WCLT-FM for country music listenership in Columbus. However, WCOL-FM is the only country station in Columbus that covers the entire metropolitan area with a full-powered signal.
