= Chuck Collier =

American radio personality

Charles Collier (May 6, 1947 – September 22, 2011) was a radio personality, best known for his many years at radio stations WGAR (AM) and WGAR-FM in Cleveland, Ohio.

== Early life ==
Collier was born on May 6, 1947, in Greenfield, Ohio, and as a boy moved to New Vienna, Ohio. He is a graduate of New Kenton High School and the University of Cincinnati.

== Career ==
He began his broadcasting career shortly after college, bouncing between jobs in Cincinnati (WSAI), Dayton (WONE), and New York City (WCBS-FM). He came to Cleveland in 1970, where he worked for WGAR (1220 AM), and later its sister station, WGAR-FM (99.5 FM). He served the latter part of his tenure as music director/afternoon drive DJ. After 41 years in the Cleveland radio market, Collier died of a heart attack on September 22, 2011.

In March 2009, Collier was inducted into the Country Radio Hall Of Fame in Nashville, Tennessee — one of only 60 personalities in the history of country radio to achieve this honor.

== Awards and honors ==
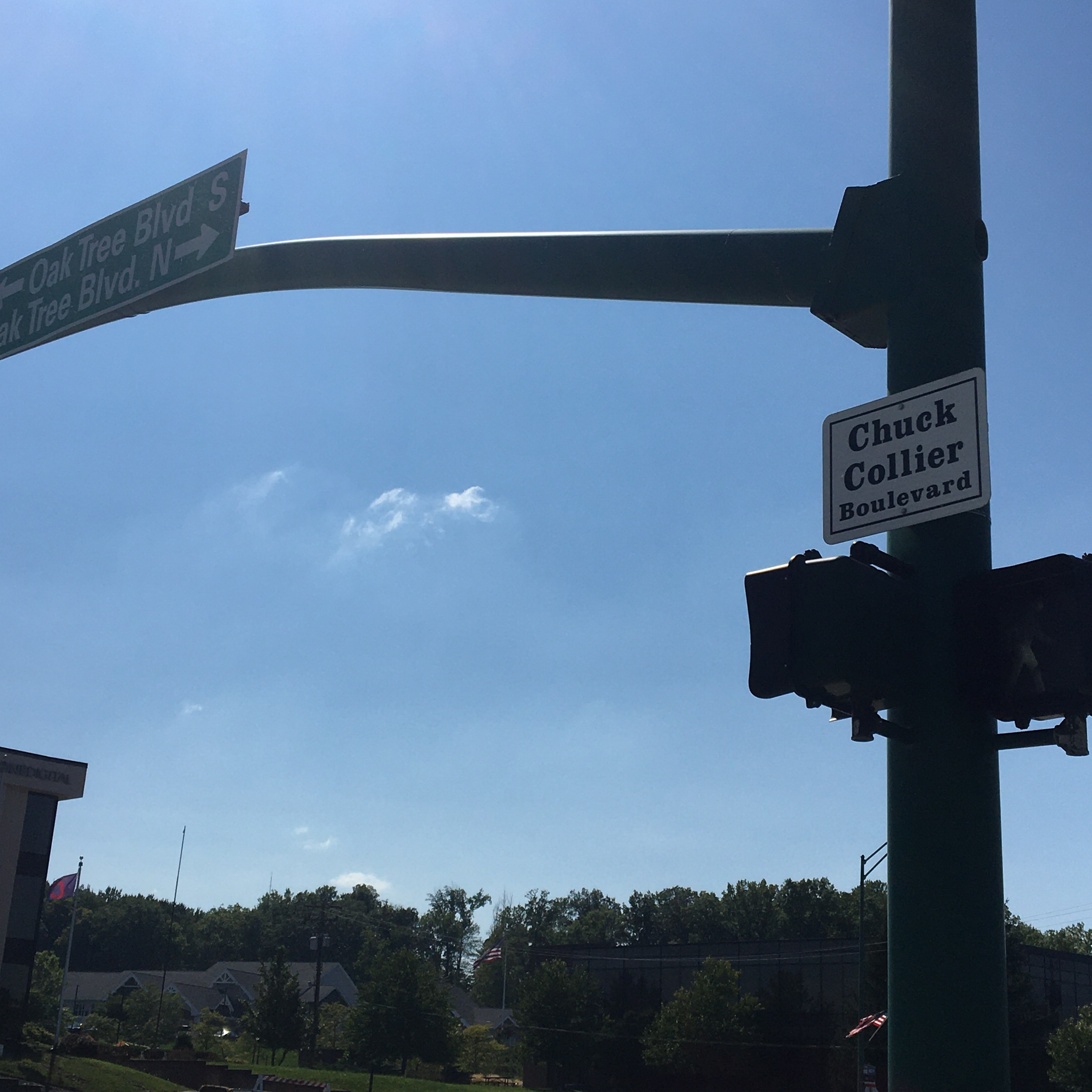
Ceremonial sign for "Chuck Collier Boulevard" in Independence, Ohio

- 2004 Cleveland Association of Broadcasters Hall of Fame inductee
- 2005 Ohio Broadcasters Hall of Fame inductee
- 2007 National Association of Broadcasters Marconi Award winner - Large Market Radio Personality of the Year
- 2009 Country Radio Hall of Fame inductee
- Section of Oak Tree Boulevard in Independence, Ohio, renamed "Chuck Collier Boulevard" in 2012
