= WCHO (AM) =

Oldies radio station in Washington Court House, Ohio

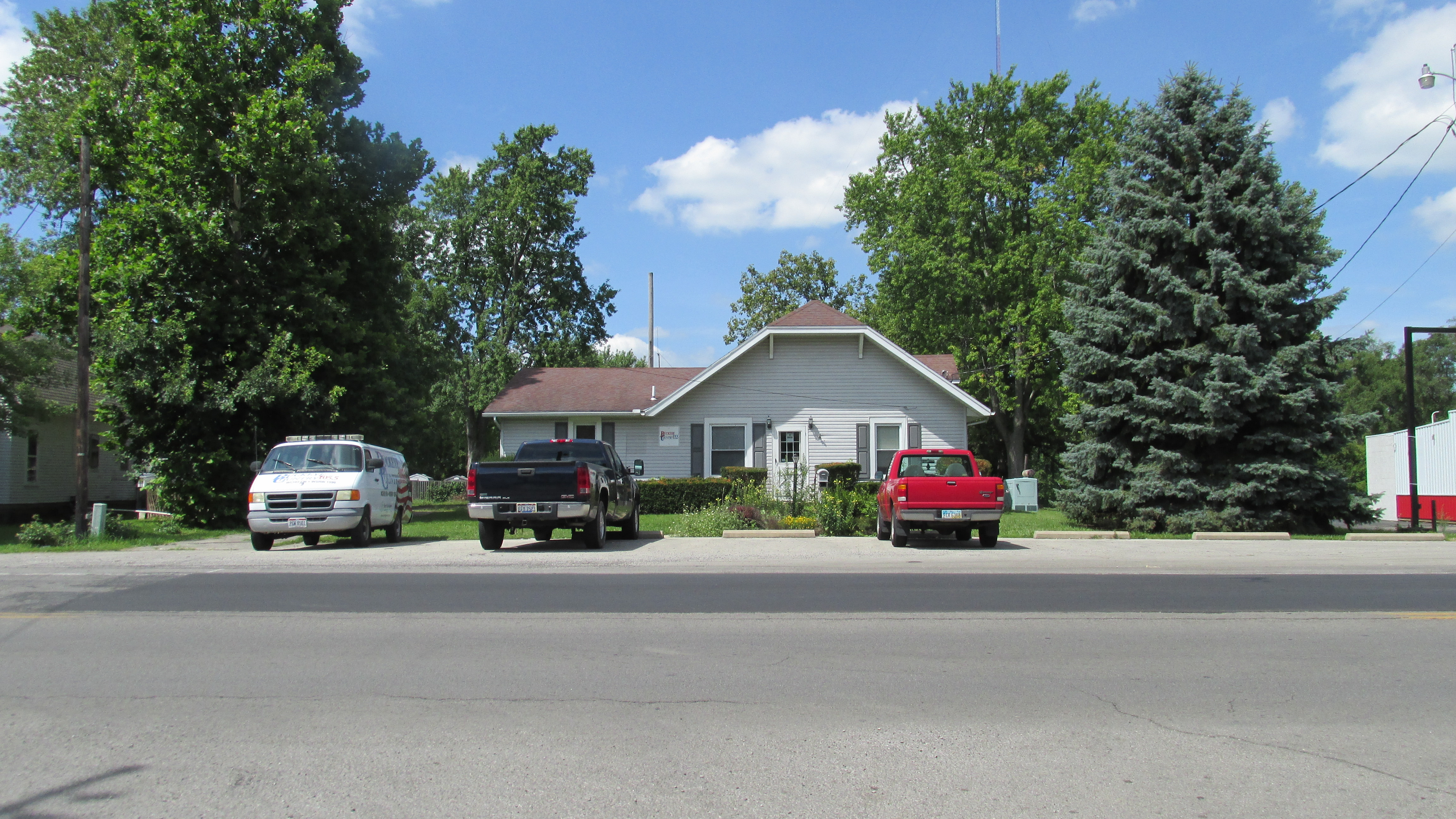
- WCHO's studios on N. North St. in Washington Court House, Ohio
- Washington Court House, Ohio; United States
- Broadcast area: Chillicothe; Washington Court House; Wilmington; Hillsboro
- Frequency: 1250 kHz
- Branding: Oldies 1250

Programming
- Format: Oldies
- Affiliations: Premium Choice; iHeartRadio; Ohio State Sports Network

Ownership
- Owner: iHeartMedia, Inc.; (iHM Licenses, LLC)
- Sister stations: WBEX, WCHI, WCHO-FM, WKKJ, WQLX, WSRW

History
- First air date: February 1952
- Former call signs: WCHO (1952–1983); WOFR (1983–1998); WBUB (1998–1999); WCHO (1999); WMXV (1999–2000); WCHO (2000–2002); WKSI (2002–2003)
- Call sign meaning: Initials of the city of license of Washington Court House, Ohio

Technical information
- Licensing authority: FCC
- Facility ID: 57355
- Class: D
- Power: 500 watts (day); 42 watts (night)
- Transmitter coordinates: 39°32′59.00″N 83°27′10.00″W

Links
- Public license information: Public file; LMS
- Webcast: Listen live (via iHeartRadio)
- Website: wchoam.iheart.com

WCHO (1250 AM) is a radio station broadcasting an oldies format. Licensed to Washington Court House, Ohio, United States, the station is owned by iHeartMedia, Inc., through licensee iHM Licenses, LLC, and features programming from iHeartMedia's Premium Choice "Cool Oldies" format. Likewise, the station's branding varies between "Cool Oldies" and "Classic Hits." During the holidays, WCHO airs Christmas music.

== History ==
The station went on the air as WCHO in February 1952. It became WOFR on June 27, 1983, then changed its call sign to WBUB on April 17, 1998, then back to WCHO on January 18, 1999, then to WMXV on November 5, 1999, then back to WCHO on October 23, 2000, then to WKSI on March 26, 2002, and back to the current WCHO on December 24, 2003.
