= WODC =

Radio station in Ashville, Ohio, serving Columbus, Ohio

- Ashville, Ohio; United States
- Broadcast area: Columbus metro area
- Frequency: 93.3 MHz (HD Radio)
- Branding: 93.3 The Bus

Programming
- Format: Classic hits
- Subchannels: HD2: WTVN simulcast (News/talk); HD3: Air1 (Worship music)
- Affiliations: Premiere Networks

Ownership
- Owner: iHeartMedia, Inc.; (iHM Licenses, LLC)
- Sister stations: WCOL-FM, WNCI, WTVN, WYTS, WXZX, WZCB

History
- First air date: July 1, 1961; 65 years ago
- Former call signs: WBEX-FM (1961–83); WKKJ (1983–2002); WFCB (2002–04); WLZT (2004–11)
- Call sign meaning: "Oldies Columbus", for former format

Technical information
- Licensing authority: FCC
- Facility ID: 52042
- Class: B
- ERP: 32,000 watts
- HAAT: 184 meters (604 ft)
- Transmitter coordinates: 39°52′34″N 82°58′49″W
- Translators: HD3: 99.3 W257CU (Columbus); HD3: 105.3 W287CL (Lancaster)

Links
- Public license information: Public file; LMS
- Webcast: Listen live (via iHeartRadio)
- Website: 933odc.iheart.com

WODC (93.3 FM) – branded as 93.3 The Bus – is a commercial classic hits radio station licensed to Ashville, Ohio, serving Columbus and the Columbus metro area. Owned by iHeartMedia, Inc., the WODC studios are located in Downtown Columbus, while its transmitter resides near Obetz. In addition to a standard analog transmission, WODC broadcasts over three HD Radio channels, and streams online via iHeartRadio.

== History ==
=== Early years (1961–2004) ===
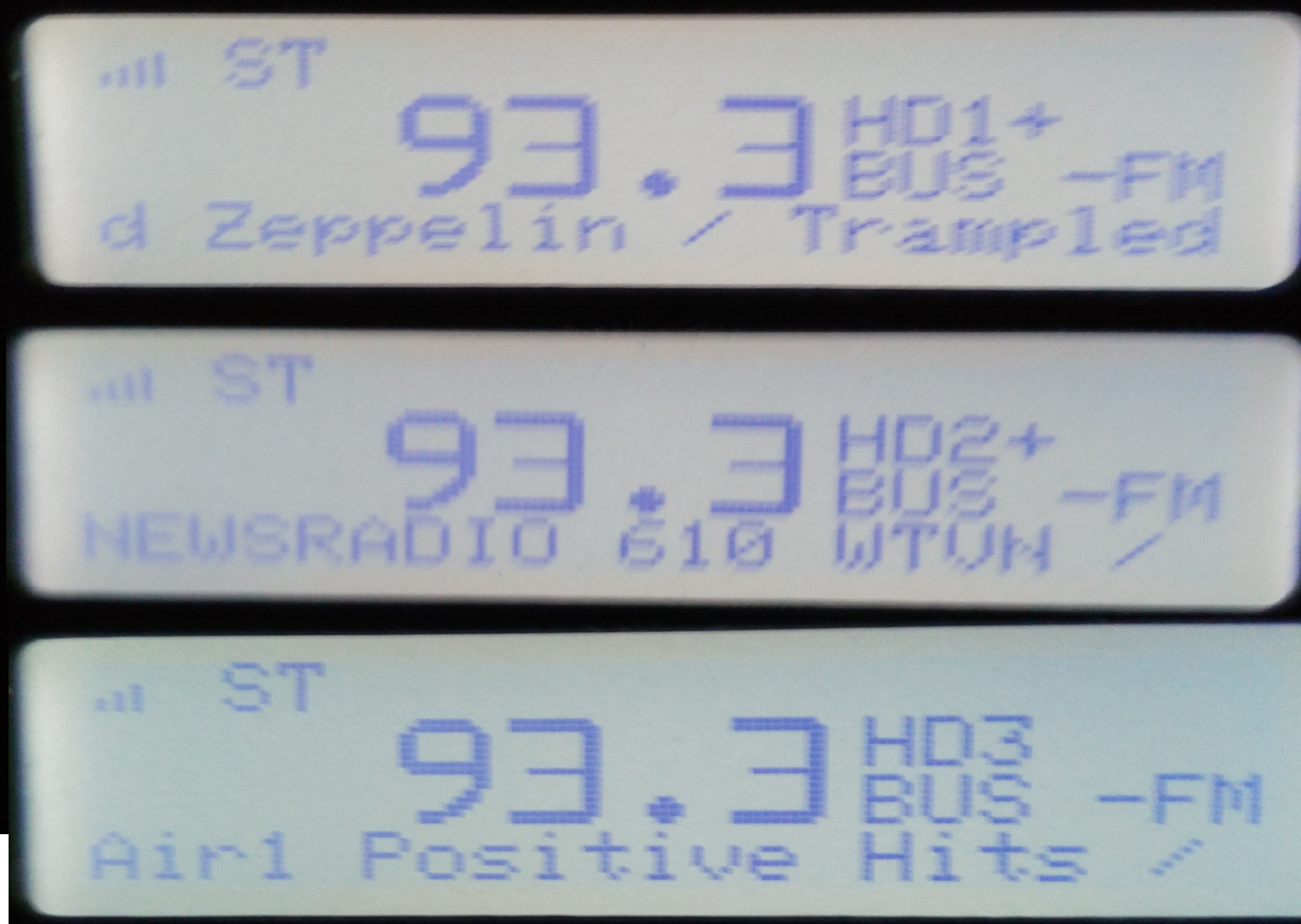
WODC's HD Radio Channels on a SPARC Radio with PSD.

Originally located at 94.3 FM, WFCB was called "WFCB-94.3", but to clear a 2002 move from Chillicothe to Ashville, frequencies were to be exchanged between WFCB and WKKJ. WKKJ was a sister Clear Channel station also in Chillicothe, but operating at 93.3 MHz, playing country music. After the switch, WFCB was re-imaged as "Mix 93.3", but continued to run and be staffed from Chillicothe.

=== Adult contemporary (2004–2011) ===
When WFCB's transmitter was officially moved to Obetz on January 1, 2004, the station was flipped to "93.3 Lite FM" and the calls were changed to WLZT. The positioner eventually transitioned from "93.3 Lite FM" to "93.3 WLZT" when the station switched to a more gold-based adult contemporary or classic hits format. After several musical changes, the station re-imaged as "Soft Rock 93.3" in May 2010.

=== Classic hits (2011–2015) ===
On September 2, 2011, on Labor Day weekend, the station began stunting with "America's Top 500." The following Tuesday at 9 a.m., following the holiday, after playing "American Pie" by Don McLean, the station switched to classic hits as "Oldies 93.3." On September 29, 2011, the callsign was changed from WLZT to WODC. In February 2014, 1980s music was added and the "Oldies 93.3" moniker was dropped, and was rebranded as "93.3 WODC."

=== Adult hits (2015–2021) ===
At midnight on December 28, 2015, WODC relaunched with an adult hits format, and rebranded as "93.3 The Bus".

From March 2016 to September 2020, WODC did an "All-80s Lunch commercial-Free Lunch Hour" during 12-1pm Monday to Friday.

From July 2016 to September 2020, WODC did three short segments Monday to Friday, "It Came from the 80s" highlighting three different songs from a certain year at 8am, "Icons at 11am" featuring three songs from a single artist and "Three-Play at 3", in which three songs linked by a certain topic were played.

Between July 2016 and September 2023, mostly on holiday weekends that started on Friday and end on Monday (Memorial Day and Labor Day), WODC did an "All-80s Weekend".

=== Classic hits (2021–present) ===
In August 2021, WODC repositioned itself as “Columbus’ Classic Hits” and added on-air staff, while retaining the “Bus” branding. The station transitioned back to a classic hits format, with a more focused playlist on music from the 1970s through 1990s.

Every year from early-mid November to December 25, WODC flips the switch and plays continuous Christmas music.

Monday to Friday, WODC does a "Commercial Free drive home" music block hosted by Kelsey Webb, from WNCI's Morning Zoo, for 93 minutes from 3:50 until about 5:15pm and an "All-80s Lunch" (since April 3, 2023) during 12-1pm playing nothing but songs from the 1980s.

In late January 2022, WODC brought back Casey Kasem's American Top 40 every Sunday morning from 8am to 12 noon. The station previously aired the show with episodes from the 1970s and '80s on Sunday mornings from April 2011 to February 2019.

In September 2024, WODC teamed up with the Columbus Blue Jackets to broadcast a select number of Columbus Blue Jackets hockey games whenever its main partner, WBNS-FM (97.1 The Fan) is unavailable to cover a Columbus Blue Jackets hockey game due to Ohio State sporting (Football or Basketball) game commitment.

In February 2025, WODC brought back The 80s Show with Jeff Stevens every Saturday night from 7pm to 12 midnight. The station previously aired the show on Sunday evenings from May 2017 to February 2019 with occasional airings between September 2019 and September 2020 during the station's "All-80s Weekend".
