= WMRN-FM =

Coordinates: 40.608°N 83.237°W

- Marion, Ohio; United States
- Broadcast area: Upper Sandusky, Marion, Bucyrus, Ohio
- Frequency: 94.3 MHz
- Branding: Buckeye Country 94.3

Programming
- Format: Country
- Affiliations: Premiere Networks

Ownership
- Owner: iHeartMedia; (iHM Licenses, LLC)
- Sister stations: WYNT, WMRN

History
- First air date: May 6, 1953 at 6:30 a.m. (as WMRN-FM at 106.9); February 27, 1975 (94.3 as WDIF)
- Former call signs: WDIF (1975–2008)
- Former frequencies: 106.9 MHz (1953–January 6, 2008)
- Call sign meaning: Marion

Technical information
- Licensing authority: FCC
- Facility ID: 59282
- Class: A
- ERP: 3,000 watts
- HAAT: 91 meters (299 ft)

Links
- Public license information: Public file; LMS
- Webcast: Listen Live
- Website: buckeyecountry943.iheart.com

WMRN-FM (94.3 MHz) is a country music radio station in Marion, Ohio, currently owned by iHeartMedia.

== Station history ==
WMRN-FM traces its origins to the expansion of radio broadcasting in Marion, Ohio by the owners of WMRN, Marion’s first licensed radio station. WMRN signed on the air on December 23, 1940, with its first regular broadcast airing at 1:15 p.m., establishing the foundation for future AM and FM operations in the region.

WMRN-FM first signed on the air on May 6, 1953, at 6:30 a.m., operating on 106.9 MHz and initially simulcasting WMRN’s AM programming. The station was launched as an FM counterpart to WMRN during the early growth of FM broadcasting in the United States. During the 1960s, WMRN-FM transitioned to an automated beautiful music format, later branded as “Stereo Marion.” On April 1, 1981, the station discontinued the beautiful music format and relaunched as a country music station.

The original WMRN-FM facility at 106.9 MHz served the Marion area under various country branding names over the years, including “FM-107,” “Country 107,” “Hot Country 107,” and “Buckeye Country 107.” On January 6, 2008, the WMRN-FM call letters and country format were moved to 94.3 MHz. The former 106.9 MHz facility subsequently relocated to the Columbus, Ohio market as WRXS.

The 94.3 MHz frequency had previously operated as WDIF, which had served Marion since 1975. WDIF featured an adult-oriented format and was originally owned by Scantland Communications, which also owned WQEL-FM (92.7 FM) in Bucyrus, Ohio. WDIF’s programming included soft jazz, adult contemporary music, and local newscasts produced by an in-house news department. The call letters reflected the station’s slogan, “WDIF Makes a Difference.”

During the late 1970s, the radio trade publication Radio & Records named WDIF “Best Small Market Station in America.” By 1982, Billboard magazine also recognized WDIF as “Best Small Market Station” in the United States.

In 1994, Scantland Communications sold WDIF-FM to Burbach Broadcasting, which also owned WMRN-AM and WMRN-FM (106.9 MHz) in Marion, along with WBUK-FM in Ottawa, Ohio and WPFX-FM in North Baltimore, Ohio. Burbach Broadcasting operated additional stations in Clarksburg, West Virginia, Parkersburg, West Virginia, and State College, Pennsylvania.

In the mid-1990s, Ohio Radio Group attempted to acquire WMRN-AM, WDIF-FM, WMRN-FM, WBUK-FM, and WPFX-FM; however, the proposed transaction was not approved by the U.S. Department of Justice due to ownership concentration limits in the Mid-Ohio market. Burbach Broadcasting later sold the Marion stations to Jacor Communications, led by Randy Michaels and based in Cincinnati, Ohio.

Prior to the reassignment of the WMRN-FM call letters, the 94.3 MHz station had also operated under the branding “Mix 94.3.”
