= WZCB =

Radio station in Dublin–Columbus, Ohio

- Dublin, Ohio; United States
- Broadcast area: Columbus metro area
- Frequency: 106.7 MHz (HD Radio)
- Branding: 106.7 The Beat

Programming
- Format: Mainstream urban
- Subchannels: HD2: Throwback 105.3 (Classic hip hop)

Ownership
- Owner: iHeartMedia; (iHM Licenses, LLC)
- Sister stations: WCOL-FM, WODC, WNCI, WTVN, WXZX, WYTS

History
- First air date: April 1953
- Former call signs: WMRN-FM (1953–2007); WRXS (2007–10); WCGX (2010–14)
- Former frequencies: 106.9 MHz (1979–2007)
- Call sign meaning: Columbus Beat

Technical information
- Licensing authority: FCC
- Facility ID: 40170
- Class: A
- ERP: 3,000 watts
- HAAT: 144 meters (472 ft)
- Transmitter coordinates: 40.159°N 82.923°W
- Translator: HD2: 105.3 W287CP (Columbus)

Links
- Public license information: Public file; LMS
- Webcast: Listen live (via iHeartRadio); HD2: Listen live (via iHeartRadio)
- Website: thebeat1067.iheart.com HD2: throwback1053.iheart.com

WZCB (106.7 FM) – branded 106.7 The Beat – is a commercial mainstream urban radio station licensed to Dublin, Ohio, serving the Columbus metro area. Owned by iHeartMedia, the WZCB studios are located in Downtown Columbus, while its transmitter resides near Columbus' northeast side. In addition to a standard analog transmission, WZCB broadcasts over two HD Radio channels, and streams online via iHeartRadio.

== History ==
=== As a Marion station (1953–2007) ===
WMRN-FM had gone on the air on 106.9 MHz in Marion, Ohio, in April 1953, more than seven years after receiving its original construction permit.

In the 1970s, it was a beautiful music station; later, it became country "Buckeye Country 107".

=== Moving to the Columbus market (2007) ===
On December 1, 2007, the station was relicensed to Dublin, Ohio and began targeting the Columbus radio market; the station frequency also had moved to 106.7 MHz. Prior to the announced launch, iHeartMedia (then known as Clear Channel Communications) registered a large number of web domains with various formats and brandings to throw off competitors from switching to null the impact of their launch. Stunting on-air consisted of television theme songs as "TV 106.7". The former country format moved to Marion's other station, 94.3 WDIF-FM, which became the new WMRN-FM in January 2008.

=== Modern rock (2007–2010) ===
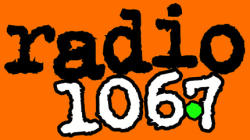
WRXS logo

On December 13, 2007 at noon, the new WRXS officially unveiled its true format, modern rock, as "Radio 106-7". The first song played on Radio 106.7 was "Radio, Radio" by Elvis Costello and the Attractions.

When Radio 106-7 first started in 2007, presentation heavily centered on modern rock music from the 1990s, as well as featuring selected songs from the mid-1970s through the end of the 1980s as well as current product. Overall, the station came across as "lighter" than typical Modern Rock radio stations. This type of presentation is highly similar to those at several other Clear Channel operations in Philadelphia, Grand Rapids, MI, and Hartford, CT. On May 2, 2009, the station tweaked its format by dropping the lighter alternative music and adding more hard rock to its rotation to compete with independent WWCD. On January 7, 2010 the station added Rover's Morning Glory to its morning lineup.

=== '90s hits (2010–2011) ===
On June 28, 2010, the station switched to a '90s pop/rock centered format as Gen-X Radio", and changed their call letters to WCGX; Rover's Morning Glory was removed from the schedule. The first song played in the new format was "Get Ready For This" by 2 Unlimited.

=== Modern adult contemporary (2011) ===
As of October 2011, WCGX shifted from '90s hits to a modern AC direction, phasing out all rhythmic product. The alternative product remained, and it has increased the amount of currents from the genre.

=== Modern rock (2011–2014) ===
On December 19, 2011, at 6 PM, WCGX officially dropped the "Gen" from their name, calling themselves "X106-7" and officially shifted to modern rock. X106-7 positioned as "Columbus' Alternative Station." This put them in competition with not only WWCD, but WRKZ. As a result, ratings were in the middle of the pack for most of X's tenure. The "X" format moved to WBWR-HD2, and eventually to the main signal 105.7 FM itself that December.

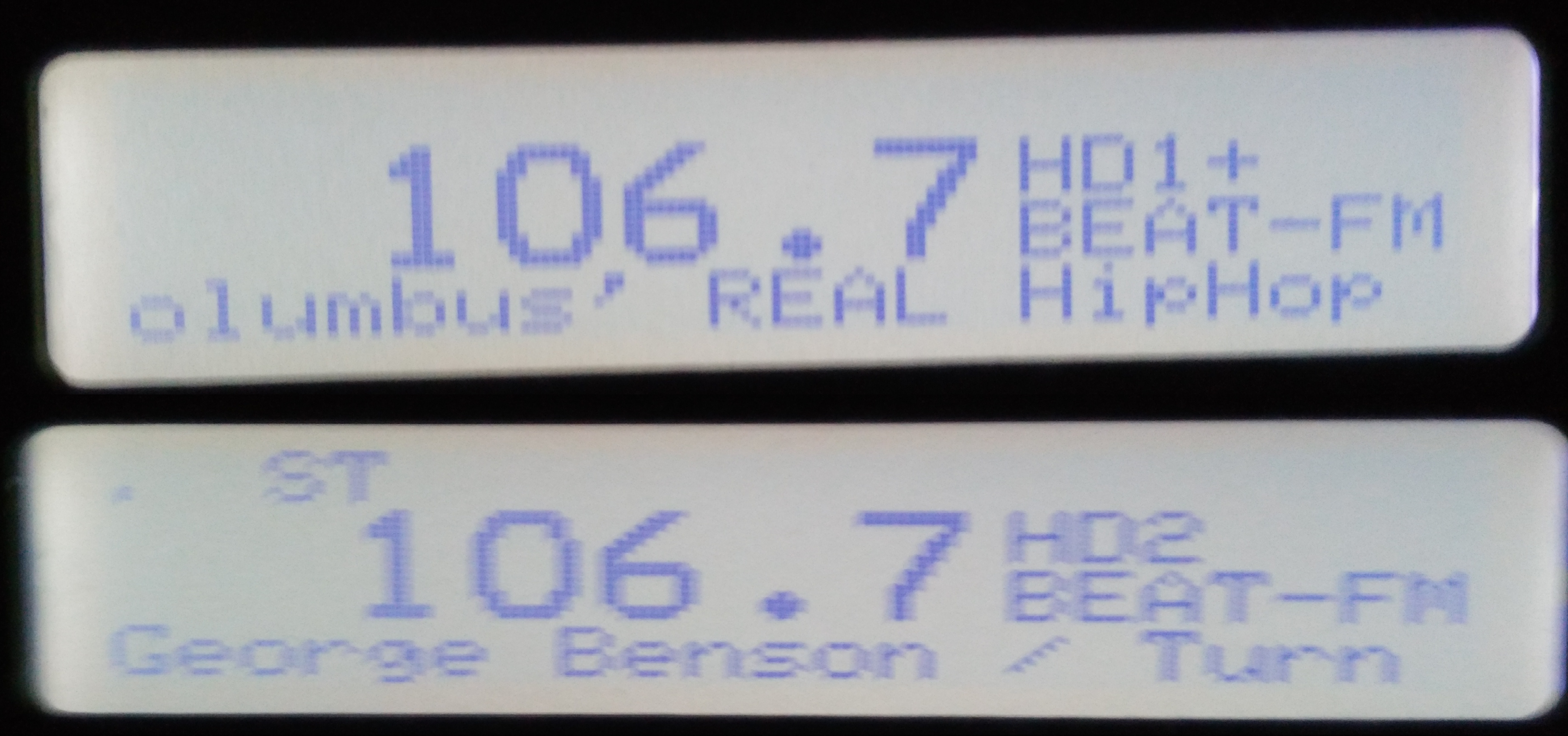
WZCB's HD Radio Channels on a SPARC Radio with PSD.

=== Urban (2014–present) ===
On September 19, 2014, at Noon, after playing "Closing Time" by Semisonic, WCGX switched to an urban format as "106.7 The Beat". The first song on "The Beat" was "Studio" by Schoolboy Q featuring BJ the Chicago Kid. The station picked up The Breakfast Club morning show, and currently competes with Radio One's WCKX. On September 26, 2014, WCGX changed call letters to WZCB to match the "Beat" branding.
