= Jacor =

American radio broadcaster

Jacor Communications
- Type: Subsidiary
- Industry: Radio network
- Founded: 1987; 39 years ago
- Defunct: 1999; 27 years ago
- Fate: Acquired by Clear Channel Communications & reorganized into iHeartMedia
- Successor: iHeartMedia
- Headquarters: Cincinnati, Ohio, US
- Key people: Terry Jacobs, Frank Wood, Randy Michaels
- Parent: Zell Chilmark (1992–1996); Citicasters (1996–1999)

Jacor Communications was a media corporation, existing between 1987 and 1999, which owned many radio stations in the United States. In 1998, Jacor was purchased by Clear Channel Communications, now iHeartMedia, for $2.8 billion.

Jacor Communications began with three religious stations and went on to acquire dozens of radio stations between 1992 and its sale to Clear Channel in 1999. It also owned a few television stations, including WKRC-TV in Cincinnati.

== History ==
Jacor Communications was founded by Terry Jacobs. Jacobs incorporated Jacor Communications in 1979 and purchased three religious stations in 1981. In June 1989, Jacor purchased Telesat Cable, a Northern Kentucky cable provider, for $5 million, which it later sold in May 1994. In 1993, an investor named Sam Zell paid $80 million from the Zell Chilmark fund to purchase controlling interest in Jacor.

In 1992, the Federal Communications Commission increased the number of radio stations a single company could own in one city to 3AMs and 3FMs. After this change, Jacor began purchasing stations, including WKRC (AM) in Cincinnati in 1993.

On February 6, 1996, Jacor announced plans to acquire Noble Broadcast Group Inc for $152 million. After the passing of the Telecommunications Act of 1996, Jacor began buying more radio stations.

On February 13, 1996, Jacor announced it would buy Citicasters for $770 million. As part of the merger, Jacor acquired WKRC-TV, a Cincinnati CBS-affiliate television station, and WTSP, a television station in Tampa, Florida. In September, Jacor announced WTSP would be swapped to Gannett Co. in exchange for three FM radio stations and three AM stations which included KIIS-FM in Los Angeles.

In May 1993, founder and CEO Terry Jacobs left Jacor. The VP of programming and COO, Randy Michaels, was named president of the company that year, and in 1996, he was promoted to CEO. Jacor's corporate headquarters were in downtown Cincinnati from the mid-1980s through 1996 when they moved across the Ohio River to Covington, Kentucky. In 1997, Jacor acquired the assets of Nationwide Communications.

In 1999, Jacor was sold to Clear Channel Communications for $3.4 billion in stock. Clear Channel also assumed approximately $1.2 billion of Jacor's debt. At the time of its acquisition, Jacor was the third-largest provider of syndicated radio programming, owning 230 radio stations and Premiere Radio networks (a radio syndication company), as well as disseminating The Rush Limbaugh Show and the Dr. Laura Schlessinger show.

Clear Channel named Randy Michaels CEO and chairman of Clear Channel Radio in 2000. In 2008, private equity firms Thomas H. Lee and Bain Capital Partners completed a buyout of Clear Channel Communications.
