= List of radio stations owned by iHeartMedia =

The following is a list of radio stations currently owned by iHeartMedia. Of these stations, 448 of the stations which are outside the Top 100 DMA markets, plus another 91 stations which may or may not be in the top 100 DMAs are for sale. The TV stations formerly owned by Clear Channel were sold to Providence Equity Partners, a private equity firm, on April 23, 2007, with the deal closing in late November 2007. 185 radio stations were to have been sold to GoodRadio.TV LLC until the sale fell apart over financing., and another 177 stations have been sold to other entities. Another 201 stations were sold in 2007.

== Radio stations ==
=== Alabama ===
==== Auburn ====
- WCJM-FM 100.9 - The Bull (country)
- WKKR 97.7 - The Kicker (country)
- WMXA 96.7 - Mix (hot AC)
- WPCH 1310 - Fox Sports The Game (sports)
- WTLM 1520 - Hallelujah (gospel)
- WZMG 910 - (sports, simulcast of WPCH (AM))

==== Birmingham ====
- WDXB 102.5 - The Bull (country)

WDXB HD-2 / W224CK 92.7 - Black Information Network (black-oriented news)

- WERC 960 - News/Talk (simulcasts most of the programming of WERC-FM)
- WERC-FM 105.5 - News Radio WERC (news/talk)

WERC-FM HD-2 / W286BK 105.1 - Hallelujah (urban gospel)
WERC-FM HD-3 / W293CM 106.5 - B (urban AC)

- WMJJ 96.5 - Magic (adult contemporary)
- WQEN 103.7 - Q (top 40)

WQEN HD-2 / W276BQ 103.1 - The Beat (urban contemporary)

==== Gadsden ====
- WAAX 570 / W270DQ 101.9 - News Radio Big WAAX (news/talk)
- WGMZ 93.1 - Z (classic hits)

==== Huntsville ====
- WDRM 102.1 - WDRM (country)
- WBHP 800 - The Big Talker (news/talk)
- WQRV 100.3 - The River (classic hits)

WQRV HD-2 / W293AH 106.5 - Kiss-FM (top 40)
WQRV HD-3 100.3 - ALT HSV (alternative)

- WTAK-FM 106.1 - WTAK (classic rock)

==== Mobile ====
- WKSJ-FM 94.9 - 95 KSJ (country)
- WMXC 99.9 - Mix (adult contemporary)

WMXC HD-2 / W262BL 100.3 - Hallelujah (gospel)

- WNTM 710 - News Radio WNTM (talk)
- WRGV 107.3 - The Beat (hip hop)
- WRKH 96.1 - The Rocket (classic rock)

WRKH HD-2 / W258AY 99.5 - KISS FM (top 40)

- WTKX-FM 101.5 - TK 101 (active rock)

==== Montgomery ====
- WHLW 104.3 - Hallelujah (urban gospel)
- WWMG 97.1 - Magic (urban AC)
- WZHT 105.7 - Hot (hip hop)

==== Tuscaloosa ====
- WACT 1420 / W245BR 96.9 - My FM (adult contemporary)
- WRTR 105.9 - Talk Radio (news/talk)
- WTXT 98.1 - 98 TXT (country)
- WZBQ 94.1 - ZBQ (top 40)

=== Alaska ===
==== Anchorage ====
- KASH-FM 107.5 - KASH Country (country)
- KBFX 100.5 - The Fox (classic rock)
- KENI 650 - News Radio KENI (news/talk)
- KGOT 101.3 - KGOT (top 40)
- KTZN 550 - Fox Sports The Zone (sports)
- KYMG 98.9 - Magic (adult contemporary)

==== Fairbanks ====
- KAKQ-FM 101.1 - Magic (hot AC)
- KFBX 970 - News Radio KFBX (news/talk)
- KIAK-FM 102.5 - KIAK (country)
- KKED 104.7 - Alt (alternative)

=== Arizona ===
==== Phoenix ====
- KESZ 99.9 - KEZ (adult contemporary)
- KFYI 550 - News/Talk KFYI (news/talk)
- KGME 910 - Fox Sports (sports)
- KMXP 96.9 - Mix (hot AC)
- KNIX-FM 102.5 - KNIX (country)
- KOY 1230 / K229DB 93.7 - El Patrón (regional Mexican)
- KYOT 95.5 - The Mountain (adult hits)
- KZZP 104.7 - KISS FM (top 40)

==== Tucson ====
- KHUD 92.9 - The Bull (country)
- KMMA 97.1 - Mega (Spanish top 40)
- KNST 790 - Newstalk AM (news/talk)
- KOHT 98.3 - Hot (hip hop)
- KRQQ 93.7 - KRQ (top 40)
- KTZR 1450 - Fox Sports (sports)
- KXEW 1600 - Radio Tejano (Tejano)

=== Arkansas ===
==== Fayetteville ====
- KEZA 107.9 - Magic (adult contemporary)
- KIGL 93.3 - The Eagle (classic rock)
- KKIX 103.9 - KIX 104 (country)
- KMXF 101.9 - Hot (top 40)

==== Fort Smith ====
- KKBD 95.9 - Big Dog (classic rock)
- KMAG 99.1 - KMAG (country)
- KWHN 1320 - News Talk KWHN (news/talk)
- KZBB 97.9 - B98 (hot adult contemporary)

==== Little Rock ====
- KDJE 100.3 - The Edge (active rock)
- KHKN 94.9 - Hot (top 40)
- KMJX 105.1 - The Wolf (classic country)
- KSSN 95.7 - KSSN 96 (country)

=== California ===
==== Bakersfield ====
- KBFP 800 - (sports, simulcast of KHTY)
- KBFP-FM 105.3 - Sunny (adult contemporary)
- KDFO 98.5 - The Fox (classic rock)
- KHTY 970 - Fox Sports (sports)
- KRAB 106.1 - ALT (alternative rock)

==== Fresno/Visalia ====
- KALZ 96.7 - PowerTalk (talk)
- KBOS-FM 94.9 - B95 (rhythmic contemporary)
- KCBL 1340 - Fox Sports (sports)
- KFBT 103.7 - The Beat (rhythmic AC)
- KFSO-FM 92.9 - La Preciosa (Spanish adult hits)
- KHGE 102.7 - The Wolf (country)
- KRDU 1130 - KRDU (Christian talk)
- KRZR 1400 - Talk (simulcast of KALZ)
- KSOF 98.9 - Soft Rock (soft adult contemporary)

==== Los Angeles ====
- KBIG 104.3 - MYfm (hot AC)
- KEIB 1150 - The Patriot (talk)
- KFI 640 - KFI AM (news/talk)
- KIIS-FM 102.7 - KISS-FM (top 40)
- KLAC 570 - LA SPORTS (sports)
- KOST 103.5/94.7/103.9 - KOST 1035 (mainstream AC)
- KRRL 92.3 - Real (hip hop)
- KSRY 103.1 - Alternative (simulcast of KYSR for Antelope Valley)
- KVVS 105.5 - Top 40 (simulcast of KIIS-FM for Antelope Valley)
- KYSR 98.7 - Alt (alternative)

==== Modesto ====
- KFIV 1360 - PowerTalk KFIV (news/talk)
- KJSN 102.3 - Sunny (adult contemporary)
- KMRQ 96.7 - Rock (active rock)
- KOSO 92.9 - The Big Dog (country)
- KWSX 1280 - Fox Sports (sports)

==== Monterey ====
- KDON-FM 102.5 - K-DON (rhythmic contemporary)
- KION 1460 / K266BD 101.1 - PowerTalk (news/talk)
- KOCN 105.1 - K-Ocean (rhythmic AC)
- KPRC-FM 100.7 / K265DG & K265DK 100.9 - La Preciosa (Spanish adult hits)
- KTOM-FM 92.7 - K-TOM (country)

==== Riverside/Temecula ====
- KFOO 1440 - Riverside's BIN (black-oriented news)
- KGGI 99.1 - KGGI (rhythmic contemporary)
- KMYT 94.5 - Radio 94-5 (alternative rock)
- KPWK 1350 - Fox Sports (sports)
- KTMQ 103.3 - Q (active rock)

==== Sacramento ====
- KBEB 92.5 - The Breeze (soft AC)
- KFBK 1530 - News KFBK (news/talk)
- KFBK-FM 93.1 - News/Talk, simulcast of KFBK (AM)
- KHYL 101.1 - V (rhythmic AC)
- KSTE 650 - Talk KSTE (talk)
- KYRV 93.7 - The River (classic hits)

KYRV HD-2 / K296GB 107.1 - The Bull (country)

- KZIS 107.9 - Kiss (hot AC)

==== San Diego ====
- KGB 760 - San Diego Sports (sports)
- KGB-FM 101.5 - KGB (classic rock)
- KHTS-FM 93.3 - Channel 9-3-3 (top-40)
- KIOZ 105.3 - Rock (rock station)
- KLSD 1360 / K277DH 103.3 - The Patriot (talk)
- KMYI 94.1 - Star (hot AC)
- KOGO 600 - NewsRadio KOGO (news/talk)
- KSSX 95.7 - Jam'n (urban contemporary)

==== San Francisco ====
- KIOI 101.3 - Star (hot AC)
- KISQ 98.1 - The Breeze (soft adult contemporary)
- KKSF 910 - The Bay Area's BIN (black-oriented news)
- KMEL 106.1 - 106 KMEL (urban contemporary)
- KNEW 960 - IHeart Sports Talk + More (sports/talk)
- KOSF 103.7 - Classic Hits (classic hits radio)
- KYLD 94.9 - Wild (top 40)

==== Stockton ====
- KQOD 100.1 - Mega 100 (rhythmic AC)

=== Colorado ===
==== Colorado Springs/Pueblo ====
- KBPL 107.9 - KBPI South (active rock)
- KCCY-FM 96.9 - Y (country)
- KIBT 96.1 - The Beat (hip hop)
- KKLI 106.3 - Sunny (adult contemporary)
- KVUU 99.9 - My (hot AC)

==== Denver ====
- KBCO 97.3 - KBCO (adult album alternative)
- KDFD 760 / K229BS 93.7 - Freedom (conservative talk)
- KDHT 95.7 / K269CL 101.7 - Hits (top 40)
- KHOW 630 - Talk Radio KHOW (news/talk)
- KOA 850 / K231BQ & K231AA 94.1 - KOA (news/talk)
- KRFX 103.5 - The Fox (mainstream rock)
- KTCL 93.3 - Channel (alternative)
- KWBL 106.7 - The Bull (country)

==== Fort Collins ====
- KBPI 107.9 - KBPI (active rock)
- KCOL 600 - KCOL (news/talk)
- KIIX 1410 - KIIX AM (classic country)
- KPAW 92.9 - The Bear (classic rock)
- KSME 96.1 - KISS FM (top 40)

KSME-HD2 / K235BT 94.9 - Radio 94.9 (adult album alternative)

- KXBG 97.9 - Big (country)

KXBG HD-2 / K297AK 107.3 - Rewind (1980's hits)

==== Pueblo ====
- KCSJ 590 - Newstalk KCSJ (news/talk)
- KPHT 95.5 - KPHT (classic hits)
- KUBE 1350 - Fox Sports (sports)

=== Connecticut ===
==== Hartford/Waterbury ====
- WHCN 105.9 - The River (classic hits)
- WKSS 95.7 - Kiss (top 40)
- WPOP 1410 / W265EB 100.9 - News Radio WPOP (news/talk/sports)
- WUCS 97.9 - Fox Sports (sports)
- WWYZ 92.5 - Country (country music)

==== New Haven ====
- WAVZ 1300 - Fox Sports (sports)
- WELI 960 / W245DK 96.9 - WELI (news/talk)
- WKCI-FM 101.3 - KC101 (top 40)

WKCI-FM HD2 / W265DB 100.9 - The Beat (hip hop)

=== Delaware ===
==== Wilmington/Dover ====
- WDOV 1410 - News Radio WDOV (news/talk)
- WDSD 94.7 - WDSD (country)
- WILM 1450 - NewsRadio WILM (news/talk)
- WRDX 92.9 - TOM FM (hot AC)
- WWTX 1290 - Fox Sports (sports)

=== District of Columbia ===
==== Washington ====
- WASH-FM 97.1 - Wash-FM (adult contemporary)
- WBIG-FM 100.3 - Big 100 (classic rock)
- WIHT 99.5 - Hot (top 40)

WIHT-HD2 99.5 - LGBTQ+ (Pride Radio)

- WMZQ-FM 98.7 - WMZQ (country)

WMZQ-FM HD2 / W284CQ 104.7 - Freedom (talk)

- WUST 1120 AM - DMV's BIN (black-oriented news)
- WWDC 101.1 - DC101 (alternative)

=== Florida ===
==== Fort Myers/Port Charlotte ====
- WBCG 98.9 - Big (classic rock)
- WBTT 105.5 - The Beat (hip hop)
- WCCF 1580 / W265EA 100.9 - WCCF NewsRadio (news/talk)
- WCKT 107.1 - Cat Country (country music)
- WCVU 104.9 - Seaview (oldies)
- WIKX 92.9 - KIX Country (country music)
- WWCD 1070 - The Zone (sports)
- WOLZ 95.3 - The Beach (classic hits)
- WZJZ 100.1 - Magic (bilingual AC)

==== Jacksonville ====
- WFXJ 930 - Fox Sports (sports)
- WJBT 93.3 - The Beat (hip hop)

WJBT HD-2 / W281AM 104.1 - Jacksonville's BIN (black-oriented news)

- WKSL 97.9 - KISS FM (top 40)
- WPLA 107.3 - Planet Radio (active rock)
- WQIK-FM 99.1 - WQIK (country)

WQIK-FM HD-2 / W295AZ 106.9 - Rumba (Spanish contemporary)

- WSOL-FM 101.5 - V (urban AC)

==== Melbourne ====
- WFKS 95.1 - Kiss (top 40)
- WLRQ-FM 99.3 - Lite Rock (adult contemporary)
- WMMB 1240 / W224DJ 92.7 - News Talk WMMB (talk/news)
- WMMV 1350 - News/Talk (simulcast of WMMB)

==== Miami ====
- WBGG-FM 105.9 - Big (classic hits)
- WHYI-FM 100.7 - Y100 (top 40)
- WINZ 940 - Fox Sports (sports)
- WIOD 610 - NewsRadio WIOD (news/talk)
- WMIA-FM 93.9 - Magic (bilingual AC)

WMIA-FM HD-2 / W228BY 93.5 - Revolution (dance)
WMIA-FM HD-3 / W284CS 104.7 - The Bull (country)

- WMIB 103.5 - The Beat (hip hop)

WMIB HD-3 / W288DD 105.5 - Throwback (classic hip hop)

- WXBN 880 - Miami's BIN (black-oriented news)
- WZTU 94.9 - Tú (Spanish top 40)

==== Orlando ====
- WFLF 540 / W226BT 93.1 / W226CT 94.1 - NewsRadio WFLF Orlando (news/talk)
- WJRR 101.1 - WJRR (active rock)
- WMGF 107.7 - Magic (adult contemporary)

WMGF-HD2 107.7 - Smooth Jazz

- WRSO 810 - Fox Sports (sports)
- WRUM 100.3 - Rumba (Spanish top 40)

WRUM HD-2 / W246BT & W246CK 97.1 - Mega (bilingual CHR)
WRUM HD-3 / W250CE 97.9 - Retro (bilingual classic hits)

- WTKS-FM 104.1 - Real Radio (talk/classic rock)

WTKS-FM HD-2 / W283AN 104.5 - The Beat (hip hop)

- WXXL 106.7 - XL (top 40)

WXXL-HD2 106.7 - LGBTQ (Pride Radio)

- WYGM 740 / W245CL 96.9 - The Game (sports)

==== Panama City ====
- WEBZ 99.3 - The Beat (urban contemporary)
- WFLF-FM 94.5 - Rock (active rock)
- WFSY 98.5 - Sunny (adult contemporary)
- WPAP 92.5 - WPAP (country)

WPAP HD-2 / W242BF 96.3 / W273DU 102.5 - Newstalk WPAP AM (conservative talk)

==== Sarasota ====
- WCTQ 92.1 - CTQ (classic country)
- WDIZ 1320 - Oldies (oldies/classics)
- WSDV 1450 / W280EV 103.9 - Kiss FM (hot adult contemporary)
- WSRZ-FM 107.9 - WSRZ (classic hits)
- WTZB 105.9 - Z105 (mainstream rock)

==== Tallahassee ====
- WFLA-FM 100.7 - WFLA (talk)
- WGMY 107.1 - Kiss FM (top 40)
- WGMY HD-2 / W287CO 105.3 - The Beat (urban contemporary)
- WGMY HD-3 / W262CC 100.3 - Tallahassee's BIN (black-oriented news)
- WTLY 1270 / W243EG 96.5 - The Spear (sports)
- WTNT-FM 94.9 - TNT (country)
- WXSR 101.5 - X (active rock)

==== Tampa Bay ====
- WBTP 106.5 - The Beat (classic hip hop)
- WDAE 620 / WDAE-FM 95.7 - WDAE (sports)
- WFLA 970/ W233AV 94.5/ W256CT 99.1 - NewsRadio WFLA (news/talk)
- WFLZ-FM 93.3 - FLZ (top 40)
- WFUS 103.5 - US FM (country)
- WHNZ 1250 / W290BJ 105.9 - WHNZ (business news/talk)
- WMTX 100.7 - Mix (adult contemporary)
- WXTB 97.9 - 98Rock (active rock)

==== West Palm Beach/Treasure Coast ====
- WAVW 92.7 - Wave (country)
- WBZT 1230 - The Gambler (sports)
- WCZR 101.7 - (talk, simulcast of WZZR)
- WJNO 1290 - NewsRadio WJNO (talk)
- WKGR 98.7 - The Gator (mainstream rock)
- WLDI 95.5 - Wild (top 40)
- WLDI HD-2 95.5 - The Buzz (alternative)
- WOLL 105.5 - Kool (adult contemporary)
- WQOL 103.7 - Coast (classic hits)
- WRLX 94.3 - Mia (Spanish top 40)
- WZTA 1370 / W300BQ 107.9 - The Patriot (talk)
- WZZR 92.1 - Real Radio (talk)

WZZR HD-2 / W227CX 93.3 - Jam'n (classic hip-hop)

=== Georgia ===
==== Albany ====
- WGEX 97.3 - Power (top 40)
- WJIZ-FM 96.3 - WJIZ (hip hop)
- WJYZ 960 - WJYZ The Light (gospel)
- WMRZ 98.1 - Kiss FM (urban AC)
- WOBB 100.3 - B100 (country)

==== Atlanta ====
- WBIN 640 - Atlanta's BIN (black-oriented news)
- WBZW 96.7 - El Patrón (regional Mexican)
- WBZY 105.7 - Z (Spanish CHR)
- WRDG 96.1 - The Beat (hip hop)
- WUBL 94.9 - The Bull (country)
- WWPW 105.3 - Power (top 40)

==== Augusta ====
- WBBQ-FM 104.3 - WBBQ (adult contemporary)
- WKSP 96.3 - Kiss FM (urban AC)
- WLUB 105.7 - The Bull (country)

WLUB HD-2 / W292EE 106.3 - Eagle (classic rock)

- WPRW-FM 107.7 - Power 107 (hip hop)
- WYNF 1340 - Augusta's BIN (black-oriented news)

==== Brunswick ====
- WBGA 1490 / W242CJ 96.3 - Real (hip hop)
- WGIG 1440 / W254DO 98.7 - WGIG (news/talk)
- WHFX 107.7 - The Fox (mainstream rock)
- WQGA 103.3 - 103Q (hot AC)
- WYNR 102.5 - WYNR (country)

==== Columbus ====
- WAGH 101.3 - Magic (urban AC)
- WDAK 540 - NewsRadio WDAK (news/talk)
- WGSY 100.1 - Sunny 100 (adult contemporary)
- WHTY 1460 / W234BX 94.7 - Columbus's BIN (black-oriented news)
- WSTH-FM 106.1 / W269CT 101.7 - South (country)
- WVRK 102.9 - Rock 103 (mainstream rock)

==== Macon ====
- WGST 720 - The Voice (news/talk)
- WIBB-FM 97.9 - WIBB (hip hop)
- WIHB 1280 / W247BW 97.3 / W277CL 103.3 - The Bull Icons (classic country)
- WIHB-FM 96.5 - The Bull (country)
- WMGE 1670 - Macon's BIN (black-oriented news)
- WMGP 98.1 - Magic (classic hits)
- WQBZ 106.3 - Q (classic rock)
- WRBV 101.7 - V (urban AC)
- WRZX 1400 - Fox Sports (sports)

==== Savannah ====
- WAEV 97.3 - Kiss FM (top 40)
- WLVH 101.1 - Love (urban AC)
- WQBT 94.1 - The Beat (hip hop)
- WSOK 1230 / W259DE 99.7 - WSOK (gospel)
- WTKS 1290 / W249BS 97.7 - NewsRadio WTKS (news/talk)
- WYKZ 98.7 - The River (adult contemporary)

=== Hawaii ===
==== Honolulu ====
- KDNN 98.5 - Island (Hawaiian contemporary)

KDNN HD-2 98.5 - Hawai’i No Ka’Oi (traditional Hawaiian)

- KHVH 830 - AM 830 (news/talk)
- KIKI 990 - Fox Sports (sports)
- KSSK 590 - KSSK (adult contemporary)
- KSSK-FM 92.3 - (adult contemporary, simulcast of KSSK (AM))
- KUBT 93.9 - The Beat (rhythmic contemporary)

KUBT HD-2 93.9 - Jamz Hawai’i (rhythmic AC/classic hip hop)

- KUCD 101.9 - Pop! (Asian CHR)

KUCD HD-2 / K256AS 99.1 - Star (alternative)

=== Illinois ===
==== Chicago ====
- WCHI-FM 95.5 - Rock (mainstream rock)

WCHI-FM-HD2 95.5 - Big HD2 (country)

- WGCI-FM 107.5 - WGCI (hip hop)
- WGRB 1390 - Inspiration (gospel)
- WKSC-FM 103.5 - Kiss FM (top 40)
- WLIT-FM 93.9 - Lite FM (soft adult contemporary)
- WMFN 640 - Chicago's BIN (black-oriented news) Owned by Birach Broadcasting Corporation
- WVAZ 102.7 - V103 (urban AC)

=== Indiana ===
==== Indianapolis ====
- WFBQ 94.7 - Q95 (classic rock)
- WNDE 1260 - Fox Sports (sports)
- WOLT 103.3 - Indy (classic alternative)

WOLT HD-2 / W248AW 97.5 - Business News (news/talk)

- WZRL 98.3 - Real (hip hop)

=== Iowa ===
==== Cedar Rapids ====
- KKRQ 100.7 - The Fox (classic rock)
- KKSY-FM 96.5 - Kiss Country (new country)
- KMJM 1360 / K268CY 101.5 - Leo (oldies)
- KOSY-FM 95.7 - Sports Radio (sports)
- KXIC 800 - KXIC (sports)
- WMT 600 - NewsRadio WMT (news/talk)

==== Davenport ====
- KCQQ 106.5 - Big (classic hits)
- KMXG 96.1 - Mix96 (adult contemporary)
- KUUL 101.3 - Kiss FM (top 40)
- WFXN 1230 - Fox Sports (sports)
- WLLR-FM 103.7 - WLLR (country)

WLLR-FM HD-2/ K283BV 104.5 - Alt (alternative rock)

- WOC 1420 - WOC (news/talk)

==== Des Moines ====
- KASI 1430 - KASI (news/talk)
- KCYZ 105.1 - Now (hot AC)
- KDRB 100.3 - The Bus (adult hits)
- KKDM 107.5 - Kiss FM (top 40)
- KXNO 1460 - KXNO (sports)
- KXNO-FM 106.3 - (sports, simulcast of KXNO (AM))

KXNO-FM HD-2 / K245CO 96.9 - The Bull (country)

- WHO 1040 - NewsRadio WHO (news/talk)

==== Sioux City ====
- KGLI 95.5 - KG95 (adult contemporary)
- KMNS 620 - Fox Sports (sports)
- KSEZ 97.9 - Z98 (rock)
- KSFT-FM 107.1 - Kiss FM (top 40)
- KWSL 1470 / K254DL 98.7 - La Preciosa (Spanish adult hits)

=== Kansas ===
==== Wichita ====
- KRBB 97.9 - B98 (adult contemporary)
- KTHR 107.3 - Alt (alternative)
- KZCH 96.3 - Channel (top 40)
- KZSN 102.1 - The Bull (country)

=== Kentucky ===
==== Lexington ====
- WBUL-FM 98.1 - The Bull (country)

WBUL-FM HD-2 / W253BK 98.5 - Icons (classic country)

- WKQQ 100.1 - WKQQ (classic rock)
- WLAP 630 - NewsRadio WLAP (news/talk)
- WLKT 104.5 - The Cat (top 40/CHR)

WLKT HD-2 / W280DO 103.9 - Real (urban contemporary)

- WMXL 94.5 - Mix (adult contemporary)
- WWTF 1580 / W249DJ 97.7 - WTF (alternative rock)

==== Louisville ====
- WAMZ 97.5 - WAMZ (country)
- WHAS 840 - NewsRadio WHAS (news/talk)
- WKJK 1080 - Talk Radio WKJK (news/talk)
- WKRD 790 - Sports talk (sports)
- WNRW 98.9 - Kiss FM (top 40)
- WQMF 95.7 - QMF (mainstream rock)

WQMF-HD2 95.7 - The Fox (active rock)

- WSDF 100.5 - 100.5 FM (variety hits)
- WTFX-FM 93.1 - Real (urban)

==== Somerset ====
- WJQQ 97.1 - Double Q (classic rock)
- WLLK-FM 102.3 - Lake (hot AC)
- WSEK 910 - Icons (classic country)
- WSEK-FM 93.9 - K93 (country)
- WSFC 1240 - WSFC (news/talk)

=== Louisiana ===
==== Baton Rouge ====
- KRVE 96.1 FM - The River (adult contemporary)
- KVDU 104.1 FM - The Vibe (urban adult contemporary)
- WFMF 102.5 FM - WFMF (contemporary hit radio)
- WJBO 1150 AM / K254DM 98.7 FM - WJBO NewsRadio (news/talk)
- WYNK-FM 101.5 - WYNK (country)

WYNK-FM HD-2 / K249DV 97.7 - Downtown Radio (oldies)

==== New Orleans ====
- WFFX 103.7 FM - Voodoo (rhythmic hot AC)
- WNOE-FM 101.1 FM - WNOE (country)
- WODT 1280 / K244FX 96.7 - New Orleans' BIN (black-oriented news)
- WQUE-FM 93.3 FM - Q93 (mainstream urban)
- WRNO-FM 99.5 FM - WRNO (news/talk)

WRNO-FM HD-2 / K242CE 96.3 - Throwback (classic hip-hop)

- WYLD 940 AM - Hallelujah (urban gospel)
- WYLD-FM 98.5 FM - WYLD (urban adult contemporary)

=== Maryland ===
==== Baltimore ====
- WCAO 600 - Heaven (gospel)
- WPOC 93.1 - WPOC (country)
- WQSR 102.7 - Jack FM (adult hits)
- WZFT 104.3 - Z (top 40)
- WWIN 1400 - Baltimore's BIN (black-oriented news) Owned by Urban One

==== Salisbury ====
- WJDY 1470 - NewsRadio WJDY (news/talk)
- WKZP 95.9 - Kiss (top 40)
- WQHQ 104.7 - Q105 (adult contemporary)
- WSBY-FM 98.9 - Magic (R&B)
- WTGM 960 - Fox Sports (sports)
- WWFG 99.9 - Froggy (country)

=== Massachusetts ===
==== Boston ====
- WBWL 101.7 - The Bull (country)
- WBZ 1030 - NewsRadio WBZ (all-news)
- WJMN 94.5 - Jam'n (rhythmic CHR)
- WRKO 680 - WRKO (news/talk)
- WXKS 1200 - Talk (conservative talk)
- WXKS-FM 107.9 - Kiss 108 (CHR)
- WZLX 100.7 - WZLX (classic rock)
- WZRM 97.7 - Rumba (Spanish CHR)

==== Cape Cod ====
- WCIB 101.9 - Cool 102 (oldies)
- WCOD-FM 106.1 - 106 WCOD (hot AC)
- WEII 96.3 - Sports Radio WEEI (sports)
- WXTK 95.1 - NewsRadio WXTK (news/talk)

==== Springfield ====
- WHYN 560 / W255DL 98.9 - NewsRadio WHYN (news/talk)
- WHYN-FM 93.1 - Mix (hot adult contemporary)
- WRNX 100.9 - Kix (country)

==== Worcester ====
- WSRS 96.1 - SRS (adult contemporary)
- WTAG 580 / W235AV 94.9 - NewsRadio WTAG (news/talk)

=== Michigan ===
==== Detroit ====
- WDFN 1130 - Detroit's BIN (black-oriented news)
- WJLB 97.9 - WJLB (hip-hop/R&B)
- WKQI 95.5 - Channel (top 40/CHR)
- WLLZ 106.7 - Detroit' Wheels (classic rock)
- WMXD 92.3 - Mix (urban AC)
- WNIC 100.3 - WNIC (adult contemporary)

==== Grand Rapids ====
- WBCT 93.7 - B93 (country)
- WBFX 101.3 - Big FM (classic hits)
- WMAX-FM 96.1 - The Game (sports)
- WMRR 101.7 - Rock (classic rock)
- WOOD 1300 - NewsRadio WOOD (news/talk)
- WOOD-FM 106.9 - (news/talk, simulcast of WOOD (AM))
- WSNX-FM 104.5 - SNX (top 40/CHR)
- WSRW-FM 105.7 - Star (adult contemporary)
- WTKG 1230 - Talk Radio WTKG (talk/sports)

==== Muskegon ====
- WKBZ 1090 - WKBZ (news/talk)
- WMUS 107.9 - 107 MUS The Moose (country)

=== Minnesota ===
==== Twin Cities (Minneapolis/St. Paul) ====
- KDWB-FM 101.3 - KDWB (CHR)
- KEEY-FM 102.1 - K102 (country)
- KFXN-FM 100.3 - KFAN: The Fan (sports)
- KQQL 107.9 - Kool 108 (classic hits)
- KQQL HD-2 / W227BF 93.3 - Twin Cities' BIN (black-oriented news)
- KQQL HD-3 / K244FE 96.7 - KFAN+ (sports)
- KTCZ-FM 97.1 - Cities (hot adult contemporary/alternative rock)
- KTCZ-FM HD-3 / K273BH 102.5 - Hot (urban contemporary)
- KTLK 1130 / K278BP 103.5 - Twin Cities Newstalk (news/talk)

==== Rochester ====
- KFAN 1270 / K228FY 93.5 - KFAN (sports)
- KMFX-FM 102.5 - The Fox (country)
- KRCH 101.7 - Laser (classic rock)

=== Mississippi ===
==== Biloxi ====
- WBUV 104.9 - Newstalk WBUV (news/talk)
- WKNN-FM 99.1 - K99 (country)
- WMJY 93.7 - Magic (adult contemporary)
- WQYZ 92.5 - Rock (classic rock)

==== Jackson ====
- WHLH 95.5 - Hallelujah (gospel)
- WJDX 620 / W284DT 104.7 - WDJX (talk/sports)
- WJDX-FM 105.1 - Real (hip hop)
- WMSI-FM 102.9 - Miss 103 (country)
- WSFZ 930 / W251DB 98.1 - Jackson's BIN (black-oriented news)
- WSTZ-FM 106.7 - Z (classic rock)

==== Laurel ====
- WJKX 102.5 - 102JKX (urban adult contemporary)
- WNSL 100.3 - SL100 (contemporary hit radio)
- WZLD 106.3 - Wild (urban contemporary)

==== Tupelo ====
- WESE 92.5 - The Beat (hip hop)
- WKMQ 1060 / W266BC 101.1 - Tupelo's Talk (news/talk)
- WTUP 1490 / W299CS 107.7 - Tupelo's BIN (black-oriented news)
- WTUP-FM 99.3 - Big (classic hits)
- WWKZ 103.9 - KZ103 (contemporary hit radio)
- WWZD-FM 106.7 - Wizard (country)

=== Missouri ===
==== Springfield ====
- KGBX-FM 105.9 - KGBX (adult contemporary)
- KGMY 1400 - Fox Sports (sports)
- KSWF 100.5 - The Wolf (country)
- KTOZ-FM 95.5 - Alice (hot AC)
- KXUS 97.3 - US97 (mainstream rock)

==== Saint Louis ====
- KATZ 1600 / K227DS 93.3 - Hallelujah (gospel music)
- KATZ-FM 100.3 - The Beat (urban contemporary)

KATZ-FM HD-2 / W279AQ 103.7 - St Louis' BIN (black-oriented news)

- KLOU 103.3 - KLOU (classic hits)
- KSD 93.7 - The Bull (country)
- KSLZ 107.7 - Z (top 40/CHR)

KSLZ-HD2 107.7 - LBGTQ+ (Pride Radio)

- KTLK-FM 104.9 - The Patriot (conservative talk)

=== Nebraska ===
==== Ogallala/North Platte ====
- KMCX-FM 106.5 - Hot Country (country music)
- KOGA 930 - KOGA (news/talk)
- KOGA-FM 99.7 - The Lake (classic hits)

==== Omaha ====
- KFAB 1110 - NewsRadio KFAB (news/talk)
- KFFF 93.3 - The Wolf (classic country)

KFFF HD-2 / K272FE 102.3 - El Patrón (regional Mexican)

- KGOR 99.9 - KGOR (classic hits)
- KISO 96.1 - Kiss FM (top 40/CHR)

KISO HD-2 / K235CD 94.9 - Rock (mainstream rock)

- KXKT 103.7 - Kat (country)

=== Nevada ===
==== Las Vegas ====
- KSNE-FM 106.5 - Sunny (mainstream AC)
- KWNR 95.5 - The Bull (country)
- KYMT 93.1 - Neon (adult hits)
- KYMT HD-2 / K280DD 103.9 - Real (urban contemporary)

=== New Hampshire ===
==== Manchester ====
- WGIR 610 - NewsRadio WGIR (talk)
- WGIR-FM 101.1 - Rock 101 (mainstream rock)

==== Portsmouth ====
- WERZ 107.1 - Z107 (CHR)
- WHEB 100.3 - WHEB (mainstream rock)
- WPKX 930 - Fox Sports (sports)
- WQSO 96.7 - NewsRadio (talk)
- WTBU 95.3 - The Bull (country)

WTBU-HD2 95.3 - Classic Country

=== New Jersey ===
==== Atlantic City ====
- WAYV 95.1 - WAYV (top 40)
- WTTH 96.1 - WTTH (urban adult contemporary)
- WZBZ 99.3 - The Buzz (rhythmic contemporary)
- WZXL 100.7 - WZXL (mainstream rock)

==== Sussex ====
- WHCY 106.3 - The Bear (country)
- WNNJ 103.7 - 103-7 NNJ (classic rock)
- WSUS 102.3 - WSUS (adult contemporary)

=== New Mexico ===
==== Albuquerque/Santa Fe ====
- KABQ 1350 - Fox Sports (sports)
- KABQ-FM 95.1 - Hot (rhythmic oldies)
- KBQI 107.9 - Big I (country)
- KBQI HD-2 / K251AU 98.1 - The Bull (classic country)
- KPEK 100.3 - The Peak (hot adult contemporary)
- KTEG 104.1 - The Edge (alternative rock)
- KZRR 94.1 - KZRR (mainstream rock)
- KZRR HD-2 / K265CA 100.9 - Power (urban contemporary)

==== Farmington ====
- KCQL 1340 / K230AF 93.9 - Fox Sports (sports)
- KDAG 96.9 - The Dog (active rock)
- KKFG 104.5 - Kool (classic hits)
- KOLZ 102.9 / K299AJ 107.7 - Star (contemporary hits)
- KTRA-FM 102.1 - KTRA (country)

==== Gallup ====
- KFMQ 106.1 - Rock (mainstream rock)
- KFXR-FM 107.3 - (country, simulcast of KGLX)
- KGLX 99.1 - KGLX (country)
- KXTC 99.9 - XTC (rhythmic contemporary)

=== New York ===
==== Albany ====
- WGY 810 - WGY NewsRadio (news/talk)
- WGY-FM 103.1 - (news/talk, simulcast of WGY (AM))
- WKKF 102.3 - Kiss (contemporary hits)
- WOFX 980 / W240EC 95.9 - Fox Sports (sports)
- WPYX 106.5 - PYX 106 (classic rock)
- WRVE 99.5 - The River (hot adult contemporary)
- WRVE HD-2 / W260CH 99.9 - Wild Country (country music)
- WTRY-FM 98.3 - TRY (oldies)

==== Binghamton ====
- WBBI 107.5 - New Country B (country)
- WBNW-FM 105.7 - Now (contemporary hit radio)
- WENE 1430 - Fox Sports (sports)
- WINR 680 / W245BV 96.9 - US (classic country)
- WKGB-FM 92.5 - KGB (active rock)
- WMXW 103.3 - Mix (adult contemporary)

==== New York City ====
- WAXQ 104.3 - Q (classic rock)
- WHTZ 100.3 - Z100 (top 40/CHR)
- WKTU 103.5 - KTU (rhythmic adult contemporary)
- WLTW 106.7 - Lite-FM (adult contemporary)
- WOR 710 - WOR (news/talk)
- WWPR-FM 105.1 - Power (urban contemporary)
- WWRL 1600 - New York's BIN (black-oriented news)

==== Poughkeepsie/Hudson Valley ====
- WBWZ 93.3 - Z93 (mainstream rock)
- WCTW 98.5 - The Cat (hot adult contemporary)
- WHUC 1230 / W295BN 106.9 - (country, trimulcast of WRWD-FM)
- WJIP 1370 - (news/talk, simulcast of WKIP)
- WKIP 1450 / W253BV 98.5 - NewsRadio WKIP (news/talk)
- WPKF 96.1 - Kiss FM (contemporary hits)
- WRNQ 92.1 - Q92 (adult contemporary)
- WRWB-FM 99.3 - (country, simulcast of WRWD-FM)
- WRWD-FM 107.3 - WRWD Country (country music)
- WZCR 93.5 - Oldies (oldies music)

==== Rochester ====
- WAIO 95.1 - Rock (active rock)
- WDVI 100.5 - Country (country music)
- WHAM 1180 / W241DG 96.1 - NewsRadio WHAM (news/talk)
- WHTK 1280 - Fox Sports (sports)
- WKGS 106.7 - Kiss (contemporary hits)
- WNBL 107.3 - Big (1980s hits)
- WVOR 102.3 - Sunny (soft adult contemporary)

==== Syracuse ====
- WBBS 104.7 - B (country)
- WHEN 620 / W269DT 101.7 - Power (urban adult contemporary)
- WSYR 570 - NewsRadio WSYR (news/talk)
- WSYR-FM 106.9 - (news/talk, simulcast of WSYR (AM))
- WWHT 107.9 - Hot (contemporary hits)
- WYYY 94.5 - Y94 (adult contemporary)

=== North Carolina ===
==== Asheville ====
- WKSF 99.9 - Kiss Country (country music)

WKSF HD-2 / W249AR 97.7 - The Brew (adult hits)

- WMXF 1400 - (sports, simulcast of WPEK)
- WPEK 880 / W225CJ 92.9 - ESPN Asheville (sports)
- WQNQ 104.3 - Star (contemporary hits)

WQNQ HD-2 / W266CP 101.1 Throwbacks (classic hip hop)

- WQNS 105.1 - Rock (mainstream rock)
- WWNC 570 - NewsRadio WWNC (news/talk)

==== Charlotte ====
- WEND 106.5 - The End (alternative rock)
- WHQC 96.1 - Hits (contemporary hits)
- WKKT 96.9 - The Kat (country)
- WLKO 102.9 - The Lake (adult hits)
- WRFX 99.7 - The Fox (classic rock)

WRFX HD-2 / W254AZ 98.7 - Charlotte's BIN (black-oriented news)

==== Greensboro-Winston-Salem-High Point ====
- WMAG 99.5 - Mix (adult contemporary)
- WMKS 100.3 - Hits (contemporary hits)
- WPTI 94.5 - WPTI (news/talk)
- WTQR 104.1 - Q (country)
- WVBZ 105.7 - Real Rock (mainstream rock)

==== Raleigh ====
- WDCG 105.1 - G105 (contemporary hits)

WDCG HD-2 / W237BZ 95.3 / W236CA 95.1 - The Beat (classic hip hop)

- WNCB 93.9 - B (country)
- WRDU 100.7 - WRDU (mainstream rock/alternative rock)
- WTKK 106.1 - Talk (news/talk)

=== North Dakota ===
==== Bismarck ====
- KBMR 1130 / K281DC 104.1 - Country KBMR (classic country)
- KFYR 550 / K259AF 99.7 - KFYR (news/talk)
- KQDY 94.5 - KQ (country)
- KSSS 101.5 - Rock 101 (active rock)
- KXMR 710 - Fox Sports (sports)
- KYYY 92.9 - Mix (adult contemporary)

==== Dickinson ====
- KCAD 99.1 - KCAD (country)
- KLTC 1460 - Big Country To Boot (classic country)
- KZRX 92.1 - Z (active rock)

==== Grand Forks ====
- KJKJ 107.5 - KJ108 (active rock)
- KKXL 1440 - The Fan (sports radio)
- KKXL-FM 92.9 - XL93 (contemporary hits)
- KQHT 96.1 - The Fox (classic hits)
- KSNR 100.3 - Cat (country)

==== Minot ====
- KCJB 910 - 91 Country (classic country)
- KIZZ 93.7 - Z94 (contemporary hits)
- KMXA-FM 99.9 - Mix (adult contemporary)
- KRRZ 1390 - KRRZ AM (classic hits)
- KYYX 97.1 - 97 Kicks (country)
- KZPR 105.3 - The Fox (active rock)

=== Ohio ===
==== Akron ====
- WHLO 640 - WHLO (talk/news)
- WKDD 98.1 - KDD (hot AC)

==== Canton ====
- WHOF 101.7 - Sunny (classic hits)

WHOF HD-2 / W259BW 99.7 - Canton's New Country (country)

- WRQK-FM 106.9 - Rock (mainstream rock)

==== Chillicothe ====
- WBEX 1490/92.7 - News/Talk
- WCHI 1350 - Soft AC
- WCHO 1250 - Oldies
- WCHO-FM 105.5 - Country
- WKKJ 94.3 - Country
- WQLX 106.5 - Hot Adult Contemporary
- WSRW 1590/101.5 - Classic hits

==== Cincinnati ====
- WCKY 1530 - Sports
- WEBN 102.7 - Active Rock

WEBN HD-2/100.7/106.3 - Alternative rock
WEBN HD-3/102.3 - Mainstream urban

- WKFS 107.1 - Hot AC
- WKRC 550 - News/Talk
- WLW 700/94.5 - News/Talk
- WSAI 1360 - Sports

==== Cleveland ====
- WAKS 96.5 - Contemporary hits

WAKS HD-2/106.1 - Urban contemporary

- WARF 1350 - Sports
- WGAR-FM 99.5 - Country
- WHLK 106.5 - Adult hits
- WMJI 105.7 - Classic hits
- WMMS 100.7 - Active rock/hot talk

WMMS HD-2/101.1 - Black Information Network
WMMS HD-3/99.1 - Sports

- WTAM 1100/106.9 - News/talk

==== Columbus ====
- WCOL-FM 92.3 - Country
- WNCI 97.9 - Contemporary Hits
- WODC 93.3 - Adult Hits
- WTVN 610 - News/Talk
- WXZX 105.7 - Alternative Rock
- WYTS 1230 - Black Information Network
- WZCB 106.7 - Mainstream Urban

WZCB HD-2/105.3 - Classic Hip-Hop

==== Dayton ====
- WCHD 99.9 - CHR/Top 40
- WIZE 1340 - Black Information Network
- WMMX 107.7 - Hot AC
- WONE 980 - Sports
- WTUE 104.7 - Classic Rock
- WZDA 103.9 - Country

==== Defiance ====
- WDFM 98.1 - Hot AC
- WNDH 103.1 - Classic Hits
- WONW 1280 - News/Talk
- WZOM 105.7 - Country

==== Lima ====
- WBKS 93.9 - Contemporary hit radio
- WIMA 1150 - News/Talk
- WIMT 102.1 - Country
- WMLX 103.3 - Adult contemporary
- WZRX-FM 107.5 - Oldies

==== Mid-Ohio (Mansfield/Ashland) ====
- WFXN-FM 102.3 - Mainstream rock
- WMAN 1400 - News/Talk
- WMAN-FM 98.3 - News/Talk (Simulcast of WMAN)
- WNCO 1340 - Sports
- WNCO-FM 101.3 - Country
- WSWR 100.1 - Classic hits
- WXXF 107.7 - Soft AC
- WYHT 105.3 - Hot AC

==== Marion ====
- WMRN 1490 - News/Talk
- WMRN-FM 94.3 - Country
- WYNT 95.9 - Adult Contemporary

==== Toledo ====
- WCKY-FM 103.7 - Classic Country
- WCWA 1230 - Sports
- WIOT 104.7 - Mainstream Rock
- WRVF 101.5 - Adult contemporary
- WSPD 1370/92.9 - News/Talk
- WVKS 92.5 - Contemporary hits

WVKS HD-2/94.9 - Urban contemporary

==== Youngstown ====
- WAKZ 95.9 - Hip Hop
- WBBG 106.1 - Country
- WKBN 570 - News/Talk
- WMXY 98.9 - Adult contemporary
- WNCD 93.3 - Mainstream rock
- WNIO 1390 - Sports

=== Oklahoma ===
==== Oklahoma City ====
- KGHM 1340 - Sports
- KJYO 102.7 - Top 40
- KOKQ 94.7 - Classic rock

KOKQ HD-2 98.5 - Regional Mexican

- KTOK 1000 - News/Talk
- KTST 101.9 - Country
- KXXY-FM 96.1 - Classic country

==== Tulsa ====
- KAKC 1300 - Conservative talk
- KIZS 101.5 - Regional Mexican
- KMOD-FM 97.5 - Active Rock
- KTBT 92.1 - Top 40
- KTBZ 1430 - Sports
- KTGX 106.1 - Country

=== Oregon ===
==== Portland ====
- KEX 1190 - Talk
- KFBW 105.9 - Rock
- KKCW 103.3 - AC
- KKRZ 100.3 - CHR

KKRZ HD-2 102.3 - Alternative Rock

- KLTH 106.7 - Classic Hits
- KPOJ 620 - Sports
- KXJM 107.5 - Classic Hip Hop

=== Pennsylvania ===
==== Allentown ====
- WAEB 790 - News/Talk
- WAEB-FM 104.1 - CHR/Top 40
- WSAN 1470 - Oldies
- WZZO 95.1 - Active rock

==== Erie ====
- WEBG 95.9 - Sports (WFNN simulcast)
- WFNN 1330 - Sports
- WJET 1400/96.7 - News/Talk
- WRKT 104.9 - Active Rock
- WRTS 103.7 - CHR/Top 40
- WTWF 93.9 - Country
- WXBB 94.7 - Adult Hits

==== Harrisburg ====
- WHKF 99.3 - Urban contemporary
- WHP 580/103.7 - News/Talk
- WRBT 94.9 - Country
- WRVV 97.3 - Classic Rock
- WTKT 1460 - Sports

==== Lancaster ====
- WLAN-FM 96.9 - CHR/Top 40

==== Philadelphia ====
- WDAS 1480/102.5 - Sports
- WDAS-FM 105.3 - Urban AC
- WIOQ 102.1 - CHR/Top 40

WIOQ-HD2 102.1 - LGBTQ+ (Pride Radio)

- WRFF 104.5 - Modern rock/Alternative
- WTEL 610 - Black Information Network (owned by Beasley Broadcast Group)
- WUMR 106.1 - Spanish CHR

WUMR-HD2 106.1 - Smooth Jazz

- WUSL 98.9 - Mainstream urban

==== Pittsburgh ====
- WBGG 970 - Sports
- WDVE 102.5 - Classic Rock
- WKST-FM 96.1 - Top 40/CHR
- WPGB 104.7 - Country
- WWSW-FM 94.5 - Classic Hits

WWSW-FM-HD2 94.5 - Oldies

- WXDX-FM 105.9 - Alternative

==== Reading ====
- WRAW 1340 - Talk
- WRFY-FM 102.5 - Hot AC

WRFY-FM HD-2 92.3 - Spanish

==== Sunbury ====
- WBLJ-FM 95.3 - Country
- WVRZ 99.7 - CHR/Top 40

==== Williamsport ====
- WBYL 95.5 - Rock
- WKSB 102.7 - Adult Contemporary
- WRAK 1400 - News/Talk
- WRKK 1200/94.9 - Silent
- WVRT 97.7 - CHR/Top 40

=== Rhode Island ===
==== Providence ====
- WHJJ 920/104.7 - News/Talk
- WHJY 94.1 - Mainstream rock
- WSNE-FM 93.3 - Hot adult contemporary
- WWBB 101.5 - Classic hits

=== South Carolina ===
==== Charleston ====
- WEZL 103.5 - Country
- WRFQ 104.5 - Classic rock
- WSCC-FM 94.3 - News/Talk
- WXLY 102.5 - Adult contemporary

==== Columbia ====
- WCOS 1400 - Sports
- WCOS-FM 97.5 - Country
- WLTY 96.7 Variety
- WNOK 104.7 - CHR
- WVOC 560/103.5 - News/Talk
- WXBT 100.1 - Urban contemporary

WXBT HD-2 105.5 - Black Information Network

==== Florence ====
- WDAR-FM 105.5 - Urban contemporary
- WDSC 800 - Sports
- WEGX 92.9 - Country
- WJMX 1400/104.5/105.9 - News/Talk
- WJMX-FM 103.3 - CHR
- WRZE 94.1 - Classic rock (simulcast of WWRK)
- WWRK 970/97.9 - Classic rock
- WZTF 102.9/95.1 - Urban adult contemporary

==== Greenville ====
- WESC 660 - Classic country (simulcast of WESC-FM)
- WESC-FM 92.5 - Classic country
- WGVL 1440 - African-American oriented all-news (Black Information Network)
- WMYI 102.5 - Variety Hits
- WROO 104.9 - Sports
- WSSL-FM 100.5 - Country

==== Myrtle Beach ====
- WGTR 107.9 - Country
- WLQB 93.5 - Regional Mexican
- WRXZ 107.1 - Mainstream rock
- WWXM 97.7 - CHR
- WYNA 104.9 - Variety

=== Tennessee ===
==== Memphis ====
- KJMS 101.1 - Urban AC
- KWNW 101.9 - Classic rock
- WDIA 1070 - Oldies
- WEGR 102.7 - Hot AC
- WHAL-FM 95.7 - Urban Gospel
- WHRK 97.1 - Hip-Hop
- WREC 600/92.1 - Talk

==== Nashville ====
- WLAC 1510/98.3 - News/Talk
- WNRQ 105.9 - Classic rock

WNRQ HD-2 97.5 - Black Information Network

- WRVW 107.5 - Top 40/CHR
- WSIX-FM 97.9 - Country

WSIX-FM HD-3 97.9 - Classic country

- WUBT 101.1 - Hip-Hop

=== Texas ===
==== Austin ====
- KASE-FM 100.7 - Country music

KASE-FM HD-2 97.5 - Alternative rock

- KHFI-FM 96.7 - Top 40
- KPEZ 102.3 - Rhythmic contemporary

KPEZ-HD2 102.3 - LGBTQ+ (Pride Radio)

- KVET 1300 - Sports radio
- KVET-FM 98.1 - Country music

KVET-FM HD2 103.1 - 80's Music

==== Beaumont ====
- KCOL-FM 92.5 - Classic hits
- KIOC 106.1 - Mainstream rock
- KKMY 104.5 - Rhythmic contemporary

KKMY HD-2 103.3 - Urban contemporary

- KLVI 560 - News Talk radio
- KYKR 95.1 - Country music

==== Bryan-College Station ====
- KAGG 96.1 - Country music
- KKYS 104.7 - Hot AC
- KNFX-FM 99.5 - Classic rock
- KVJM 103.1 - Top 40

==== Corpus Christi ====
- KKTX 1360 - News Talk radio
- KMXR 93.9 - Classic Hits
- KNCN 101.3 - Active rock
- KRYS-FM 99.1 - Country music
- KSAB 99.9 - Tejano music
- KUNO 1400 - Spanish music

==== Dallas ====
- KDGE 102.1 - Mainstream AC
- KDMX 102.9 - Hot AC
- KEGL 97.1 - Active Rock

KEGL-HD2 97.1 - Alternative rock

- KFXR 1190 - Talk radio
- KHKS 106.1 - Top 40/CHR

KHKS-HD2 106.1 - LBGTQ+ (Pride Radio)

- KHVN 970/95.3 - Black Information Network
- KKGM 1630 - Black Information Network
- KZPS 92.5 - Classic rock

==== El Paso ====
- KHEY 1380 - Sports Radio
- KHEY-FM 96.3 - Country music
- KPRR 102.1 - Rhythmic contemporary

KPRR HD-2 93.5 - Rhythmic oldies/Classic hip-hop

- KTSM 690 - News Talk radio
- KTSM-FM 99.9 - Mainstream AC

==== Houston ====
- KBME 790 - Sports radio
- KODA 99.1 - Adult contemporary music
- KPRC 950 - Talk radio
- KQBT 93.7 - Urban music
- KTBZ-FM 94.5 - Alternative rock
- KTRH 740 - News Talk radio
- KXYZ 1320 - Black Information Network

==== McAllen-Brownsville ====
- KBFM 104.1 - Rhythmic Top 40
- KHKZ 106.3 - Hot AC
- KQXX-FM 105.5 - Hot AC (simulcast of KHKZ)
- KTEX 100.3 - Country music
- KVNS 1700 - Sports

==== San Antonio ====
- KAJA 97.3 - Country music
- KQXT-FM 101.9 - AC

KQXT-FM HD-3 105.7 - Regional Mexican

- KRPT 92.5/93.3 - Classic country
- KTKR 760 - Sports radio
- KXXM 96.1 - Latin Pop/Adult Contemporary
- KZEP-FM 104.5 - Spanish CHR
- WOAI 1200 AM - News Talk radio (first "Clear Channel" owned station, merged with KAJA FM under San Antonio Broadcasting umbrella)

==== Waco-Killeen-Temple ====
- KBGO 95.7 FM - Classic Hits

KBGO HD-2 95.1 - Rhythmic Contemporary

- KBRQ 102.5 FM - Active rock
- KIIZ-FM 92.3 - Urban music
- KLFX 107.3 FM - Active rock
- KWTX 1230 AM - News/Talk
- KWTX-FM 97.5 - Top 40 Mainstream
- WACO-FM 99.9 - Country music

=== Utah ===
==== Salt Lake City ====
- KAAZ-FM 106.7 - Mainstream Rock
- KJMY 99.5 - Hot AC

KJMY HD-2 99.1 - Business News

- KNRS 570 - Talk
- KNRS-FM 105.9 - Talk
- KODJ 94.1 - Classic Hits
- KZHT 97.1 - Top 40

=== Virginia ===
==== Harrisonburg ====
- WACL 98.5 - Classic Rock
- WAZR 93.7 - Top 40/CHR
- WKCY 1300/107.9 - Talk
- WKCY-FM 104.3 - Country
- WKDW 900 - Classic Country
- WSVO 93.1 - Adult Contemporary

==== Norfolk ====
- WHBT-FM 92.1 - Black Information Network
- WMOV-FM 107.7 - Contemporary hit radio
- WNOH 105.3 - Soft AC
- WOWI 102.9 - Urban

==== Roanoke ====
- WJJS 93.5 - Rhythmic Contemporary
- WJJX 102.7 - Rhythmic Contemporary
- WROV-FM 96.3 - Classic Rock

WROV-FM HD-2 96.7 - Black Information Network

- WSTV 104.9 - Adult Hits

WSTV HD-2 96.9 - Alternative Rock

- WYYD 107.9 - Country

==== Winchester ====
- WFQX 99.3 - Classic rock
- WKSI-FM 98.3 - Top 40/CHR

WKSI-FM HD-2 95.7 - Classic Country

- WMRE 1550 - Sports
- WUSQ-FM 102.5 - Country

=== Washington ===
==== Seattle ====
- KBKS-FM 106.1 - Top 40/CHR
- KHHO 850 - Black Information Network
- KJAQ 96.5 - Adult Hits

KJAQ-HD2 96.5 - Alternative Rock

- KJEB 95.7 - Classic Hits
- KJR 950 - Sports
- KJR-FM 93.3 - Sports (KJR simulcast)

KJR-FM-HD2 93.3 - Hip Hop

- KPTR 1090 - Conservative Talk
- KZOK-FM 102.5 - Classic Rock

==== Spokane ====
- KCDA 103.1 - Hot AC
- KFOO-FM 96.1 - Alternative Rock
- KISC 98.1 - Adult Contemporary

KISC HD-2 99.3 - Country

- KKZX 98.9 - Classic Rock
- KQNT 590 - News/Talk
- KZFS 1280/101.5 - Classic Hip Hop

=== West Virginia ===
==== Huntington ====
- WAMX 106.3 - Classic rock
- WBVB 97.1 - Classic hits
- WKEE-FM 100.5 - Contemporary hit radio
- WTCR-FM 103.3 - Country
- WVHU 800 - News/Talk
- WZWB 1420 - Sports

==== Parkersburg ====
- WDMX 100.1 - Classic Hits
- WLTP 910 - News/Talk
- WNUS 107.1 - Country
- WRVB 102.1 - Contemporary hit radio

==== Wheeling ====
- WBBD 1400/103.9 - Sports
- WEGW 107.5 - Classic rock
- WKWK-FM 97.3 - Adult contemporary
- WOVK 98.7 - Country
- WVKF 95.7 - Contemporary hit radio
- WWVA 1170 - News/Talk

=== Wisconsin ===
==== Eau Claire ====
- WATQ 106.7 - Classic country
- WBIZ 1400/98.7 - Sports
- WBIZ-FM 100.7 - Contemporary hit radio
- WMEQ 880/106.3 - News/Talk
- WMEQ-FM 92.1 - Classic rock
- WQRB 95.1 - Country

==== Madison ====
- WIBA 1310 - News/Talk
- WIBA-FM 101.5 - Classic rock

WIBA-FM HD-2 100.9 - Oldies

- WMAD 96.3 - Country
- WTSO 1070 - Sports
- WXXM 92.1 - Classic Hits
- WZEE 104.1 - CHR

==== Milwaukee ====
- WISN 1130 - News/Talk
- WKKV-FM 100.7 - Urban contemporary
- WMIL-FM 106.1 - Country
- WOKY 920 - Sports
- WRIT-FM 95.7 - Classic Hits
- WRNW 97.3 - Adult Contemporary

=== Wyoming ===
==== Cheyenne ====
- KOLT-FM 100.7 - Country

KOLT-FM HD-2 97.1 - Adult Contemporary
