= KIIX =

KIIX may refer to:

- KIIX (AM), a radio station (1410 AM) licensed to Fort Collins, Colorado, United States
- KFOO-FM, a radio station (96.1 FM) licensed to Opportunity, Washington, United States, which used the call sign KIIX-FM from 2014 to 2018
- KCOL (AM), a radio station (600 AM) licensed to Wellington, Colorado, United States, which used the call sign KIIX from 1959 to 1999
