= KYWY =

KYWY may refer to:

- KYWY (FM), a radio station (95.5 FM) licensed to serve Pine Bluffs, Wyoming, United States
- KWBL, a radio station (106.7 FM) licensed to serve Denver, Colorado, United States, which held the call sign KYWY in 2017
- KPAW, a radio station (92.9 FM) licensed to serve Warren Air Force Base, Wyoming, which held the call sign KYWY from 2016 to 2017
