= KVCU =

Radio station at the University of Colorado Boulder

Coordinates: 39°57′53″N 105°14′07″W

- Boulder, Colorado; United States
- Broadcast area: Boulder and Denver
- Frequency: 1190 kHz
- Branding: Radio 1190

Programming
- Format: Freeform

Ownership
- Owner: The University of Colorado Foundation, Inc.

History
- First air date: November 1, 1973 (as KADE)
- Former call signs: KADE (1974–1985); KBCO (1985–1994, 1994–1998); KBLD (June 1994)
- Call sign meaning: The Voice of CU

Technical information
- Licensing authority: FCC
- Facility ID: 48965
- Class: D
- Power: AM: 6,800 watts day 5,000 watts critical hours 110 watts night FM: 99 watts
- Translator: K225BS (92.9 MHz) Denver (Note: Owned by the Open Media Foundation.)

Links
- Public license information: Public file; LMS
- Webcast: Listen live
- Website: 1190.radio

KVCU (1190 AM), branded Radio 1190, is a college radio station affiliated with the University of Colorado Boulder. Operated by CU since 1998, the station broadcasts from studios in the basement of Carlson Gymnasium on the CU campus.

== History ==
=== As a commercial station ===
The Brocade Broadcasting Company (later changed to Brokade Broadcasting), owned by Enid C. Pepperd and Dona B. West, obtained a construction permit from the Federal Communications Commission for a new daytime-only radio station in Boulder on November 6, 1972, nearly four years after filing for the station in February 1969. The station signed on November 1, with middle of the road music and news programming. The format was short-lived, the station lost money, and the owners wanted out; a sales manager, Dan Skibitsky, persuaded Brokade to change the format to progressive rock. Though the format flip brought more interest, a sale was still in the cards. Two years after launching, Brocade sold the station to the Greenlee and Gawne families, trading as Centennial Wireless, for $220,000. In 1979, the station was approved to increase power to 5,000 watts. Two years later, the Greenlees then acquired KRNW (97.3 FM), which they relaunched as freeform rocker and adult album alternative format pioneer KBCO.

KADE became KBCO in 1985, and two years later, the Greenlees sold the pair to Noble Broadcast Group in a $27.25 million transaction. Up until then a low-rated simulcast of the FM, the station changed to talk in 1995 as "KHOW2", a brand extension of co-owned KHOW (630 AM). Noble owned the stations until it was purchased by Jacor in 1996.

=== Donation to CU ===
In mid-1997, Jacor offered the 1190 AM facility to the University of Colorado—as a donation. CU had not owned a broadcast station in nearly 75 years; from 1922 to 1925, the university had operated KFAJ, which conducted experiments and supported instruction in radio communications, but which was unlistenable at any time KOA was broadcasting and was thus closed. At the time, the university's carrier-current station could not even be heard in all campus dormitories. Jacor had good reason to make the donation: it needed to divest a station if it wanted to acquire KTCL in Fort Collins, another FM station the company was already programming in the region, as it owned a full complement of eight stations in the Denver market.

The station went off the air in January 1998 to prepare for the transfer, and under the new call letters KVCU, it signed on November 4 of the same year. The new outlet aired a combination of student output and programs from volunteer DJs—60 of them by 2001.

For the first time since breaking from its simulcast with KBCO-FM in 1995, 1190 AM's programming began being heard on FM in 2016, when the station debuted on an FM translator (K255DA at 98.9 MHz, now K251CV on 98.1) in Boulder. As of March 2021, K251CV relays the HD3 sub-channel of KQKS. The station ceased broadcasting on FM translators by the spring of 2023, when it voluntarily went off the air temporarily for modernization and general improvements.

=== 2022 silent period and 2023 relaunch ===
In 2011, Mikey Flanagan left the station as general manager, and CU-Boulder's School of Journalism and Mass Communication shuttered, leading to a shakeup in station administration that eventually resulted in the professional general manager position being eliminated and replaced by a CMCI faculty oversight position.

The COVID-19 pandemic in 2020 also hit Radio 1190 hard, with a near-total station shutdown and shift to automated programming for several months. While student DJs were allowed to return to the studio later the same year, operational continuity suffered; the station lost control of its FM translators, and the quality of both the AM and streaming services was erratic.

In May 2022, Radio 1190 voluntarily ceased terrestrial broadcast while a professional chief engineer was brought on board to improve the station's technical infrastructure. Broadcasts continued online, and the station returned to the AM airwaves on February 16, 2023.

=== 2024–present: station expansion ===
In the 2024–2025 school year, the station regained a professional general manager, and also returned to the FM airwaves on translator K225BS 92.9 FM Denver beginning on February 13, 2025.

Radio 1190 moved to new studios in the garden level of CU's Carlson Gymnasium over the 2025–26 winter break after nearly 50 years in the basement of the University Memorial Center. The last song played by live DJs in the UMC (after a 24-hour all-live station lock-in) was "This Must Be the Place (Naive Melody)" by Talking Heads, at 7:03 p.m. on Dec. 6, 2025. The first song played from the new studios in Carlson Gym was the Ting Tings' "Basement", at 10:17 p.m. on Jan. 2, 2026.

== See also ==
- Campus radio
- List of college radio stations in the United States
