= K246 =

K246 or K-246 may refer to:

- K-246 (Kansas highway), a state highway in Kansas
- HMS Spey (K246), a former UK Royal Navy ship
- K246CI, a radio station
- K.246 Piano Concerto No. 8 (Mozart) in C major, "Lützow" (1776)
