= KWBL =

Country music radio station in Denver

- Denver, Colorado; United States
- Broadcast area: Denver metropolitan area
- Frequency: 106.7 MHz (HD Radio)
- Branding: 106-7 The Bull

Programming
- Format: Country
- Subchannels: HD2: TikTok Radio
- Affiliations: Premiere Networks

Ownership
- Owner: iHeartMedia, Inc.; (iHM Licenses, LLC)
- Sister stations: KBCO, KBPI, KDFD, KHOW, KOA, KDHT, KRFX, KTCL

History
- First air date: June 19, 1962
- Former call signs: KLZ-FM (1962–1977); KAZY (1977–1994); KBPI (1994–2017); KYWY (2017)
- Call sign meaning: "Bull"

Technical information
- Licensing authority: FCC
- Facility ID: 29739
- Class: C0
- ERP: 100,000 watts
- HAAT: 408 meters (1,339 ft)
- Transmitter coordinates: 39°43′58.00″N 105°14′8.00″W

Links
- Public license information: Public file; LMS
- Webcast: Listen live (via iHeartRadio)
- Website: 1067thebull.iheart.com

KWBL (106.7 FM) is a commercial radio station licensed to Denver, Colorado. It is owned by iHeartMedia and it broadcasts a country format branded as 106.7 The Bull. KWBL carries two nationally syndicated country music shows from co-owned Premiere Networks: The Bobby Bones Show on weekday mornings and After MidNite with Granger Smith heard overnight. The radio studios are located in the Denver Tech Center.

KWBL has an effective radiated power (ERP) of 100,000 watts. The transmitter is on Lookout Mountain in Golden, amid the towers for other Denver-area FM and TV stations. KWBL broadcasts using HD Radio technology. Its HD-2 digital subchannel carries iHeartRadio's "TikTok Radio" service.

== History ==
=== KLZ-FM (1962–1977) ===
106.7 FM signed the air on June 19, 1962, as KLZ-FM. Initially airing a simulcast of their then-AM sister station, it flipped to a rock format August 4, 1965, and was America's first rock format radio station on the FM band.

=== KAZY (1977–1994) ===
In 1977, KLZ-FM changed their call letters to KAZY (now at 93.7 FM in Cheyenne, Wyoming) and continued with a mainstream rock format.

=== KBPI (1994–2017) ===
On April 20, 1994, KBPI took over the 106.7 frequency, moving from 105.9 (now KALC). The station aired an active rock format, which was harder than what was previously heard on KAZY.

==== 1996 Mosque Incident ====
On March 19, 1996, KBPI made national headlines following the suspension of three of the station's disc jockeys, Joey Teenan, Dean Meyers, and Roger Beatty, after the station was interrupted by two of its disc jockeys, Meyers and Beatty, breaking into mosques and playing "The Star-Spangled Banner" with a trumpet and a bugle blaring loud during its morning show, while the third jockey, Teenan, wore a turban and an Abdul Rauf shirt during a "Torture Tuesday" segment. Station manager Jack Evans called the stunt "an ill-conceived attempt at humor" and replied on the segment being "judgemental". Evans forced all three of its disc jockeys to leave the studio following the incident.

=== KWBL (2017–present) ===
In December 2017, iHeartMedia re-aligned multiple stations in the Denver, Colorado Springs, Fort Collins, and Cheyenne markets in order to form a trimulcast (which was later split up on January 28, 2019) of KBPI on the 107.9 frequency. To facilitate the move for the main signal, on the 1st, KYWY (an adult contemporary station in Cheyenne, Wyoming, which was acquired by iHeart in 2016) moved its existing format to an HD Radio subchannel of KOLT-FM and its analog translator on 97.1, allowing KPAW to move its classic rock format and call letters to the 92.9 signal four days later. On the 11th, KBPI then moved its format and call letters to KPAW and translator K300CP, while also adding a simulcast on KDZA-FM. The KYWY calls were warehoused on the former 106.7 signal; iHeart stated that the station would temporarily simulcast KBPI through the end of the year, and be re-launched with a new format after the end of the simulcast period.

On December 18, 2017, at 5 p.m., KYWY dropped out of the simulcast and, following a 10-minute stunt montage of random TV and movie audio clips backed by a ticking clock, flipped to country music as 106.7 The Bull, launching with a 10,000 song commercial-free marathon, starting with "Body Like a Back Road" by Sam Hunt. The flip gave long-time country stalwart KYGO its first full-market competition since that station flipped to the format in 1979, while also competing with KWOF, which rimshots the market from the north (KWOF later flipped to sports talk in 2018 after its sale to Kroenke Sports & Entertainment). On December 26, 2017, KYWY changed its call letters to KWBL to match its new branding.
