= KXBG =

Radio station in Cheyenne, Wyoming

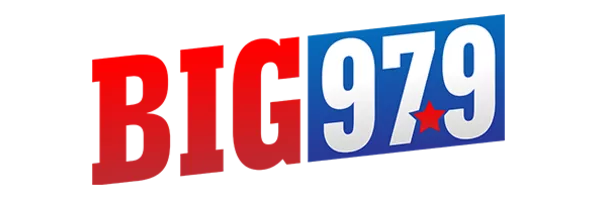
- Cheyenne, Wyoming; United States
- Broadcast area: Cheyenne, Wyoming; Fort Collins-Greeley
- Frequency: 97.9 MHz (HD Radio)
- Branding: Big 97.9

Programming
- Format: Country
- Subchannels: HD2: 1980s hits

Ownership
- Owner: iHeartMedia; (iHM Licenses, LLC)
- Sister stations: K235BT, K246CI, KBPI, KCOL, KIIX, KOLT-FM, KPAW KSME

History
- First air date: 1968
- Former call signs: KFBC-FM (1968–1978); KFBQ-FM (1978–1996); KIGN (1996–2002); KQLF (2002–2007); KQMY (2007–2008)
- Call sign meaning: "Big"

Technical information
- Licensing authority: FCC
- Facility ID: 7693
- Class: C1
- ERP: 100,000 watts
- HAAT: 293 meters (961 ft)
- Transmitter coordinates: 41°6′1″N 105°0′23″W
- Translators: HD2: 107.3 K297AK (Loveland, CO)

Links
- Public license information: Public file; LMS
- Webcast: Listen live (via iHeartRadio); Listen live (HD2)
- Website: big979.iheart.com; 1073rewindonline.iheart.com (HD2)

KXBG (97.9 FM) is a radio station licensed to Cheyenne, Wyoming, United States. Owned by iHeartMedia, it broadcasts a country format targeting the Fort Collins-Greeley, Colorado, area. Its studios are located in Loveland, Colorado.

== History ==
The station was assigned the call sign KFBQ-FM on November 20, 1978. On April 15, 1996, it changed to KIGN and on June 3, 2002, to KQLF. On June 6, 2007, the station became KQMY and finally on January 17, 2008, the current KXBG.

== KXBG-HD2 ==
On November 13, 2014, KXBG launched an HD2 subchannel simulcast on translator K297AK 107.3 FM in Loveland, which was previously simulcasting Christian station KDNR, and began stunting with Christmas music as "Santa 107.3". On December 26, 2014, the HD2 subchannel flipped to AC as "Sunny 107.3". On December 26, 2015, after stunting with Christmas music as "Santa 107.3", the HD2 subchannel flipped to Christian AC as "Up 107.3". On June 26, 2017, the HD2 subchannel began stunting with Christmas music as "Santa 107.3", which had been used in each of the past three holiday seasons. On June 29, 2017, the HD2 subchannel launched a 90's hits format, branded as "iHeart 90s 107.3", simulcast on translator K297AK 107.3 FM in Loveland, with the first song being "Jump Around" by House of Pain. On August 11, 2017, the channel was rebranded as "B107.3". On November 3, 2022, the HD2 subchannel began stunting with Christmas music as "Christmas 107.3". On December 26, KXBG-HD2 ended Christmas stunting and launched a 1980s hits format, branded as "Rewind 107.3".
