= Jay Marvin =

American radio talk show host and writer

Marvin Jay Cohen (1953 - January 31, 2023), better known by his broadcast name of Jay Marvin, was a retired American liberal radio talk show host and writer. Marvin began his radio career in 1971 as a country music DJ at KWMC in Del Rio, Texas. After that, he worked at various stations including WWOD Lynchburg, Virginia, K102 FM El Paso, Texas, WHBQ in Memphis, WJEZ and WJJD Chicago, Illinois, and KKAT Salt Lake City, Utah, and Top 40 station KIXZ in Amarillo, Texas. He switched to talk radio in the late 1980s starting at WTKN St. Petersburg, Florida and then moved to WFLA in Tampa. From there, he moved to WTMJ Milwaukee, Wisconsin, WLS Chicago (twice), and KHOW and KKZN in Denver, Colorado. He has also guest hosted nationally for Ed Schultz, Jerry Springer, and Alan Colmes.

Marvin has interviewed many famous guests on his show, including Howard Dean, John Kerry, Jimmy Carter, and Mike Gravel, as well as other guests and local Colorado politicians including Mark Udall, Bill Ritter, Ed Perlmutter, and Diana DeGette.

In September 2010, Marvin announced his retirement from radio. Following a prolonged illness, Jay Marvin died in Denver on January 31, 2023 at the age of 70.

== Bibliography ==
- Punk Blood, 1998 (ISBN 1-57366-047-7)
- The White Trash Chronicles, 2001 (ISBN 1-58736-050-0)
