= Mike Rosen =

American political pundit

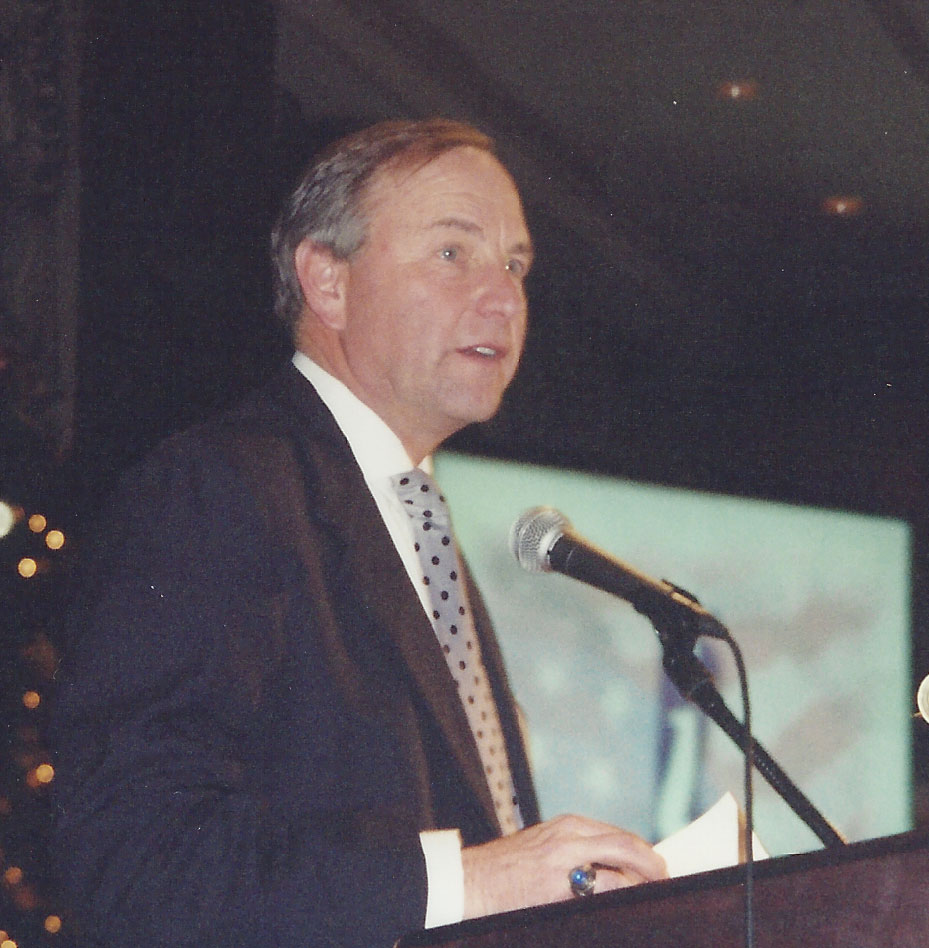
Rosen in 2002

Michael Rosen (born December 5, 1944) is an American radio personality and political commentator. He was the host of The Mike Rosen Show on talk radio station 850 KOA in Denver, Colorado, until January 4, 2016, as well as a weekly opinion columnist for The Denver Post and previously a weekly opinion columnist for the Rocky Mountain News. Rosen has described himself as an "advocate for generally right-center, mainstream conservative ideas."

== The Mike Rosen Show ==
Mike Rosen is a self-described conservative political commentator and longtime host of The Mike Rosen Show, a political talk radio show on 850 KOA, broadcasting out of Denver, Colorado, where he held the weekday 1 p.m.-3 p.m. time slot. Rosen had previously occupied the 9 a.m.-12 p.m. time slot for over 25 years, but moved to afternoons (and lost one hour) starting on January 6, 2014. The change was made in order for KOA to air The Rush Limbaugh Show live from 10 a.m.-1 p.m. Prior to the time change, The Rush Limbaugh Show was recorded and aired from 12 p.m.-3 p.m.

On December 10, 2015, Rosen announced his retirement from his daily show effective at the end of 2015. Rosen remained as a contributor on 850 KOA, covering political events through 2016. Mandy Connell became Rosen's replacement in an afternoon show that runs from 1 p.m.-4 p.m. Connell began hosting the show effective January 4, 2016. In February, 2017, Rosen began hosting a movie review program on KOA, Mike Rosen at the Movies, airing Saturday mornings at 8:00.

Rosen filled in for Rush Limbaugh on The Rush Limbaugh Show on February 24 and 25, 2005.

The Governor of Colorado and the Mayor of Denver came on as guests to The Mike Rosen Show on a monthly basis to discuss current issues and to answer listeners' questions. Other prominent guests to have come on The Mike Rosen Show include John McCain and Condoleezza Rice.

Mike Rosen twice appeared on the Talkers Magazine "Heavy Hundred" list of the most important U.S. radio talk show hosts. In 2009 Rosen appeared as number 82 on the list and in 2010 as number 86.

== Newspaper columns and other commentary ==
Starting March 6, 2009, Rosen writes a weekly column for The Denver Post. Prior to moving to The Denver Post, Rosen wrote a weekly column for the Rocky Mountain News until that newspaper's final issue in February 2009.

He is also contributing political commentary to other outlets, including RealClearPolitics.

Rosen wrote a May 31, 2012 column for The Denver Post, under the headline "Mike Coffman was right about Obama in the first place," strongly agreeing with a speech given by Mike Coffman. In that speech, Coffman questioned the birth certificate of President Barack Obama and asserted that Obama was not loyal to the United States. Rosen dismissed Coffman's later apology as a "pragmatic" election-year maneuver.

== Biography ==
Rosen was born in Brooklyn, New York, on December 5, 1944. He grew up in New York and has lived in Colorado for over 50 years. He earned an MBA degree from the University of Denver and has worked as a corporate finance executive at Samsonite and Beatrice Foods. A veteran of the U.S. Army, Rosen served as Special Assistant for Financial Management to the Assistant Secretary of the Navy at The Pentagon. He is divorced and has two grown children.

On February 2, 2009 it was reported that Rosen had lost a "seven-figure sum" of his retirement savings from investing with Agile Group, a Boulder, Colorado investment firm that Rosen had run ads for on the air, and that unknown to Rosen at the time was acting as a feeder fund for Bernard Madoff. Rosen devoted the first full hour of his February 3, 2009 radio show to this topic.
