= KSME =

Coordinates: 40.681°N 104.943°W

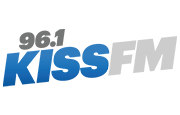
- Greeley, Colorado; United States
- Broadcast area: Fort Collins, Colorado; Loveland, Colorado
- Frequency: 96.1 MHz (HD Radio)
- Branding: 96.1 Kiss FM

Programming
- Format: FM/HD1: Top 40 (CHR); HD2: Adult alternative "Radio 94.9"
- Affiliations: Premiere Networks

Ownership
- Owner: iHeartMedia; (iHM Licenses, LLC)
- Sister stations: KBPI, KCOL-AM, KIIX, KOLT-FM, KPAW, KXBG, K235BT, K246CI, K297AK

History
- First air date: 1975
- Former call signs: KISF (1986–1988); KSQI (1988–1991); KGLL (1991–2002)
- Call sign meaning: "Kiss Me"

Technical information
- Licensing authority: FCC
- Facility ID: 17626
- Class: C1
- ERP: 100,000 watts
- HAAT: 224 meters (735 ft)
- Translators: 94.9 K235BT (Fort Collins, relays HD2)

Links
- Public license information: Public file; LMS
- Webcast: Listen Live
- Website: kissfmcolorado.iheart.com

KSME (96.1 FM) is a commercial radio station licensed to Greeley, Colorado. It is owned by iHeartMedia and it broadcasts a top 40 (CHR) format. The station's studio is located in Loveland at Crossroads Blvd. and I-25.

The station broadcasts using HD Radio technology, offering an HD2 subchannel that features an adult alternative format. This subchannel is also relayed on a low-power FM translator, K235BT, at 94.9 FM, which is branded as "Radio 94.9." This HD Radio simulcast moved to KSME from its sister station KPAW in December 2017 as part of a larger station realignment by iHeartMedia in the Colorado area. The current KSME call sign itself is a phonetic play on its branding, suggesting "Kiss Me."

== History ==
The station's history dates back to 1975 when it first began broadcasting. Over its initial years, the station used several different call signs. From 1986 to 1988, it was known as KISF, followed by KSQI from 1988 to 1991, and then KGLL from 1991 until 2002.

For a period, the station broadcast a country music format under the call sign KGLL-FM, where it was known on-air as "96.1 The Eagle." The switch to its current Contemporary Hit Radio (CHR) format and the "96.1 Kiss FM" branding took place on October 7, 2000. When the station first adopted the CHR format, it initially carried the nationally syndicated Rick Dees in the Morning show, which it continued to air until 2002. Following that, it featured a local morning show hosted by the station's program director at the time.

In November 2008, the station changed its syndicated morning programming, replacing the local show with the popular Johnjay and Rich show from KZZP in Phoenix.

KSME was owned by Jacor Broadcasting, precursor to Clear Channel Communications, which changed to the current iHeartMedia name in 2014.

KSME was home to long time station programmer Rob Lewis, known on-air as "Big Rob." Lewis had a sixteen-year tenure with iHeartMedia, during which he served as the Program Director for the station, as well as for its sister, KYWY "Star 97.1" in Cheyenne, Wyoming (which is no longer on air). He also hosted the evening show on KPTT "95.7 The Party" in Denver. Lewis departed iHeartMedia in November 2021 to take a position as Brand Manager for a competing station in the Fort Collins area, before later moving to a Program Director role at "Mix 100" KIMN in Denver.

In 2014, the station won the large market "Station of the Year" award from the Colorado Broadcasters Association. KSME competes with KARS, which is owned by Townsquare Media.

KSME airs syndicated programming for some dayparts.
