= KDFD =

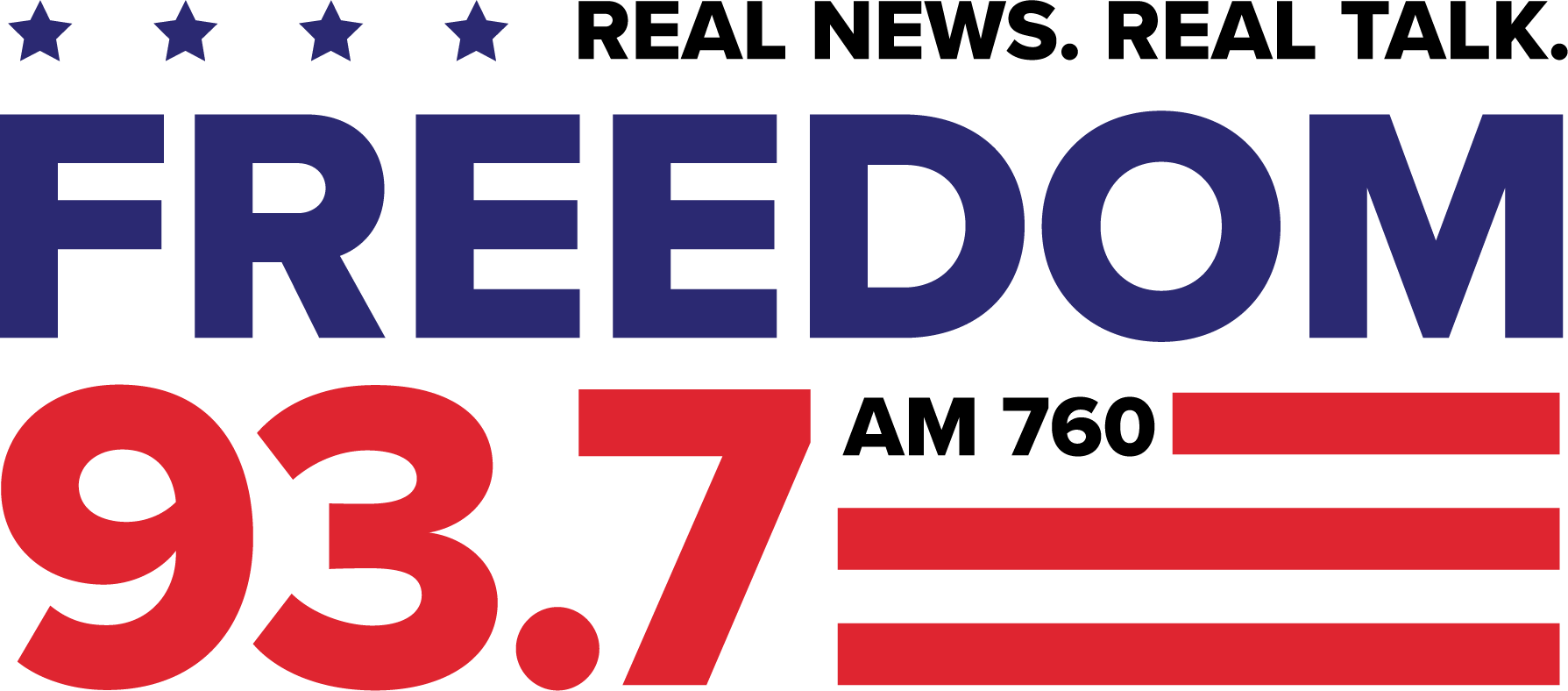
- Thornton, Colorado; United States
- Broadcast area: Denver-Boulder metropolitan area
- Frequency: 760 kHz
- Branding: Freedom 93.7

Programming
- Format: Conservative talk
- Affiliations: Premiere Networks; Fox News Radio; Compass Media Networks

Ownership
- Owner: iHeartMedia, Inc.; (iHM Licenses, LLC)
- Sister stations: KBCO, KHOW, KBPI, KDHT, KOA, KRFX, KTCL, KWBL

History
- First air date: June 15, 1987
- Former call signs: KJIM (1987–1990); KRZN (1990–1993); KTLK (1993–2002); KKZN (2002–2015); KDSP (2015–2019)
- Call sign meaning: "Denver Freedom"

Technical information
- Licensing authority: FCC
- Facility ID: 29740
- Class: B
- Power: 50,000 watts (day); 1,000 watts (night)
- Transmitter coordinates: 40°0′32.9″N 104°56′22.9″W
- Translator: 93.7 K229BS (Lakewood)

Links
- Public license information: Public file; LMS
- Webcast: Listen live (via iHeartRadio)
- Website: freedom937.iheart.com

KDFD (760 AM) is a commercial radio station licensed to Thornton, Colorado, and serving the Denver-Boulder metropolitan area. Owned by iHeartMedia, it broadcasts a conservative talk radio format. Its studios and offices are in Southeast Denver, while the transmitter site is off Colorado Boulevard (County Road 13) in Brighton. Weekdays begin with This Morning, America's First News with Gordon Deal followed by Glenn Beck, Clay Travis & Buck Sexton, Sean Hannity, Jesse Kelly, Dave Ramsey and Coast to Coast AM with George Noory. Most hours begin with Fox News Radio.

By day, KDFD transmits 50,000 watts, the maximum power permitted by the Federal Communications Commission (FCC), but the nighttime power is reduced to 1,000 watts and KDFD uses a directional antenna to protect the dominant Class A station on 760 AM, WJR in Detroit. Clear-channel stations are protected within a 750–mile radius of the transmitter site. The station is also simulcast on FM translator K229BS at 93.7 MHz in Lakewood, from which the station derives its current branding.

== History ==
=== Early history ===
The station went on the air as KJIM on June 15, 1987. It had a power of 5,000 watts during daytime hours and reduced power of 1,000 watts at night. On January 2, 1990, the station changed its call sign to KRZN, and on December 13, 1993, to KTLK. On January 7, 2002, the station's call sign was changed to KKZN.

The station initially began broadcasting with a Christian talk and teaching format. It was owned by Sudbrink Broadcasting. The station also played Contemporary Christian Music with a Top 40/AOR style. Though the studio was new and built to host talk shows, very little took place there. In November 1987, Jann Scott of Boulder started broadcasting Addiction Free Radio on weekends. In the Spring of 1988, Scott became English talk program director. Scott launched Jann Scott Live, Race Day Radio Magazine and gave people such as Claudia Lamb and Bill Hammel their start in radio. The station programmed Mexican music in the Mornings and evenings up until 1990. Jann Scott is one of the few hosts on the station to win 2 Westword's Best Talk show Host awards: 1988 for Addiction Free Radio and 1989 for Race Day Radio Magazine. He also won Rocky Mountain News Top 10 Ten Colorado Broadcaster award. In 1990 KJIM and KRZN swapped frequencies with KRZN taking its Olides format and calls to AM 760. After a time, KRZN flipped to Adult Standards. In 1993, Jacor Communications (then owners of KOA and KRFX) acquired KRZN and changed its call letters to KTLK (which was previously used on AM 1280 in Denver, broadcasting a Top 40 format during the 1970s) and flipping to a Talk Radio format with long time Denver radio talker Peter Boyles handing morning drive (Boyles previous did an evening shift on KHOW in the early 1980's). Boyles would stay on KTLK until Jacor acquired crosstown KHOW and Boyles having his talk show moved to that respected frequency. Boyles would remain on KHOW until his departure from the station in 2013.

In 2002, the station switched to all-sports as "760 The Zone," from which the KKZN call sign is derived. After that, the station switched to progressive talk as the Denver affiliate of the Air America radio network in August 2004.

=== Colorado's Progressive Talk ===
During its previous progressive talk format, the most popular local talk host on KKZN was David Sirota, also a newspaper columnist. In March 2009, Sirota took over the morning time slot of The Jay Marvin Show, hosted by local talk show host Jay Marvin, when Marvin was forced off the air due to ill health. Sirota moved to Clear Channel Communications sister station KHOW in 2012, co-hosting an afternoon show with Michael Brown until Sirota's departure in January 2013.

Besides broadcasting progressive talk shows, KKZN also ran what it called a Blue List. This list included companies that supported progressive causes and interests. The station also sponsored progressive events throughout the Colorado Front Range, such as events for the ACLU and other progressive organizations.

On January 21, 2010, Air America filed for Chapter 7 Bankruptcy, and ceased live programming the same night. Reruns of Air America's programming continued to air until Monday January 25, 2010 at 7 pm Mountain Time.

=== Real Talk 760 ===
On May 7, 2014, Denver Post television critic Joan Ostrow reported that Gloria Neal, who anchors the 6 pm newscast on KCNC-TV along with hosting KKZN's morning show, had been released from her contract, and mentioned on Facebook that the entire staff had been let go, suggesting an oncoming format change.

On May 19, 2014, KKZN shifted their format to lifestyle/advice talk, branded as "Real Talk 760" with all syndicated personalities, including Dave Ramsey, Jim Bohannon, Clark Howard, Dr. Joy Browne, and Tom Martino, along with a late night radio replay of TMZ Live. Weekends, besides Leo Laporte's The Tech Guy, consisted of brokered programming.

=== Sports radio ===
On December 10, 2015, KKZN changed its call letters to KDSP, and flipped to sports talk as Denver Sports 760 on January 4, 2016, affiliating with Fox Sports Radio. (KEPN and KKFN were the Fox Sports outlets in Denver but they became the local ESPN Radio network affiliates on the same day.)

On July 27, 2017, KDSP rebranded as Orange and Blue 760, narrowing its content to focus almost-exclusively on the Denver Broncos of the National Football League (whose games are carried by sister station KOA). It carried shows discussing the team, and live coverage of all team press conferences. Former Broncos player Tyler Polumbus also joined the station as a new morning co-host. In addition, KDSP also carried coverage of University of Colorado college basketball, and NBC Sports Radio programming.

=== Freedom 93.7 ===
On June 25, 2019, KDSP changed its call letters to KDFD. On July 8, 2019, KDFD began stunting with songs relating to patriotism or containing the word "Freedom", interspersed with sweepers stating that "Freedom" was "coming soon". It also began simulcasting on FM translator 93.7 K229BS in Lakewood, which was bought from KCKK owners Hunt Broadcasting for $1.8 million.

On July 15, 2019, KDFD launched a new conservative talk format branded as Freedom 93.7. The station's lineup consists entirely of syndicated programs, primarily from co-owned Premiere Networks. Glenn Beck and Sean Hannity were moved from sister station KHOW, and Rush Limbaugh was moved from KOA. KHOW and KOA continued to air these three programs for a period until they were replaced by local programs. It was reported that iHeartMedia's hiring of former Broncos player and KKFN host Alfred Williams to host a new show on KOA (which officially premiered September 3) was a main impetus for the flip.
