= KBCO =

Adult album alternative radio station licensed to Boulder, Colorado

Coordinates: 39.913°N 105.293°W

- Boulder, Colorado; United States
- Broadcast area: Denver; Boulder; Fort Collins, Colorado
- Frequency: 97.3 MHz (HD Radio)
- Branding: 97.3 KBCO

Programming
- Format: Adult album alternative (AAA)
- Subchannels: HD2: The Studio C Channel; HD3: Dance music (Pride Radio)

Ownership
- Owner: iHeartMedia; (iHM Licenses, LLC)
- Sister stations: KBPI; KDFD; KHOW; KOA; KDHT; KRFX; KTCL; KWBL

History
- First air date: October 1, 1955 (as KRNW)
- Former call signs: KRNW (1955–1977)
- Call sign meaning: Boulder, Colorado

Technical information
- Licensing authority: FCC
- Facility ID: 48966
- Class: C
- ERP: 100,000 watts horizontal; 85,000 watts vertical
- HAAT: 469 meters (1,539 ft)

Links
- Public license information: Public file; LMS
- Webcast: Listen live (via iHeartRadio); HD2: Listen live (via iHeartRadio)
- Website: kbco.iheart.com

KBCO (97.3 FM) is a radio station in Boulder, Colorado. It serves Boulder, the Denver metropolitan area, and Northern Colorado. Owned by iHeartMedia, it broadcasts an adult album alternative (AAA) format.

Its studios are located alongside its sister stations in southeast Denver, while its transmitter is located southwest of Eldorado Springs.

== History ==
In 1955, the station first signed on as KRNW. It was owned by Robert Wilkenson and broadcast with an effective radiated power of 2,000 watts, a fraction of its current output. The studios were located at 1305 Spruce Street in downtown Boulder, Colorado.

The current format on the station was derived in part from another Boulder station, KADE (1190 AM). KADE was a solar-powered daytimer station, which signed on and off the air in conjunction with the rising and setting of the sun. KADE was purchased in 1975 by Bob Greenlee. Two years later, Greenlee also purchased KRNW, which then became KBCO-FM. The original studio was located in an office complex at 1900 Folsom Street in Boulder. The station's original transmitter was located on a tower atop Lee Hill. Bob Greenlee worked with consulting engineers and petitioned the Federal Communications Commission (FCC) to boost KBCO's power.

The original format was co-designed by Dennis Constantine and Randy Morrison (formerly of KBPI in Denver and WLS-FM/WDAI in Chicago; he had also designed the format for KADE). At launch, the airstaff included Dennis Constantine, the station's original program director, in the mornings; Bob Lynch overnight; music director Judy McNutt; and production director Richard Ray. Jon Steele hosted in the evenings.

The freedom allowed to the DJs in the early days sparked a high level of creativity. The station produced an award-winning series of yearly broadcasts, collectively known as "Intervention Day: Planet Earth's Premier Holiday". Intervention Day broadcasts were set in the future and celebrated the day the Inter-Galactic Community intervened to prevent Earth's leaders from destroying the planet. Celebrations were marked by music from the time prior intervention day. The broadcasts won the 1987 International Radio Festival of New York "Grand Award for Best Entertainment Program of the Year". Worldwide competition included ABC, National Public Radio, the Canadian Broadcasting Corporation and the BBC.

In 1982, KBCO was the first station in Colorado to play music from CDs. In a partnership with local audio retailer Listen Up, CDs and playback equipment were shipped in from Japan.

Greenlee moved KADE and KBCO to a state-of-the-art studio complex at 4801 Riverbend Road in East Boulder and then sold the stations to Noble Broadcasting in 1987. During this time of KBCO's history, deejays selected the songs to play on their own shows from a broad music library.

In 1988, KBCO Studio C was created by production director Tom Koetting with a performance by Melissa Etheridge in a small cramped production studio. The studio was later upgraded, and many artists in Colorado for a concert tour or promotion tour would stop by to play live on the radio. The station releases a CD every year in late November with the best or most memorable Studio C performances. The CDs, titled KBCO Studio C followed by the volume number, sell out quickly and all proceeds from the album are donated to the Boulder County AIDS Project and Food Bank of the Rockies. Two retrospective CDs have been released combining the best of the previous CDs and several unreleased songs.

KBCO has occasionally been rated #1 in the Denver-Boulder Arbitron ratings with overall listeners 12+, the first time in 1988. KBCO is often rated #1 with its target audience 25 to 54-year-olds. In 1996, the station was sold to Jacor Communications (a forerunner of current owner iHeartMedia). The sale resulted in a tightening of the format. For a period in the mid-1990s, the station aired the syndicated advice program Loveline, which was typically heard on rock and alternative stations.

KBCO DJs no longer have control over what they play except during special features. The playlist is chosen by the station's programming staff.

In 2010, KBCO moved from its home at Pearl and Folsom in Boulder to the Clear Channel studios - now iHeartRadio - on S. Monaco in the Denver Tech Center shared with stations KOA, KBPI, KRFX, KPTT and KTCL.

In 2023, Scott Arbough retired from the station. He joined KBCO in 1985 and had been program director since 2000.

KBCO carries the noncommercial show Etown every Sunday. The show, hosted by Nick and Helen Forster, originates from Boulder and features live performances and an emphasis on environmental issues.

Current DJs include Keefer and Robbyn Hart. Mid-day host and music director Ginger, a 34-year KBCO veteran retired at the end of 2022, but may occasionally make a guest appearance. On June 24, 2026, Bret Saunders announced on his Facebook profile that he was no longer with KBCO. Later that day, The Denver Post reported that iHeartRadio, the parent corporation of KBCO, had let Saunders go as a cost cutting measure.

== HD radio ==
In 2005, KBCO received an experimental permit from the FCC and became the first FM radio station in the state of Colorado to implement "Multicasting". It airs two subchannels using the Ibquity Digital HD system. The station debuted an HD2 sub-channel playing only songs recorded in KBCO's "Studio C." The Studio C Channel is also available on KBCO's web site, along with the New Music Channel, an Internet channel playing all new releases.

KBCO's HD3 subchannel carried the news/talk programming of co-owned KOA, with two translator stations fed by it: 94.1 K231AA in Boulder and 94.1 K231BQ in Golden.

On June 26, 2019, KBCO-HD3 flipped to iHeart's "Pride Radio" format of Top 40/Dance music targeting the LGBTQ community. This marks the second such format to air in Denver, the other being Audacy's "Channel Q" network airing on KALC-HD2.
