= KPAW =

- Warren AFB, Wyoming; United States
- Broadcast area: Cheyenne, Wyoming; Northern Colorado
- Frequency: 92.9 MHz
- Branding: 92.9 The Bear

Programming
- Format: Classic rock

Ownership
- Owner: iHeartMedia, Inc.; (iHM Licenses, LLC)
- Sister stations: K235BT, K246CI, KBPI, KCOL, KIIX, KOLT-FM, KSME, KXBG

History
- First air date: 1978 (as KMOR-FM in Scottsbluff, NE)
- Former call signs: KMOR-FM (1978–2007); KOLT-FM (2007–2016); KYWY (2016–2017)
- Call sign meaning: K PAW means a Bears Paw. (92.9 The Bear station name)

Technical information
- Licensing authority: FCC
- Facility ID: 67474
- Class: C2
- ERP: 33,000 watts
- HAAT: 185 meters (607 ft)
- Transmitter coordinates: 41°4′34.9″N 105°12′11.9″W

Links
- Public license information: Public file; LMS
- Webcast: Listen Live
- Website: thebear929.iheart.com

KPAW (92.9 FM) is a radio station licensed to Warren AFB, Wyoming. Owned by iHeartMedia, it broadcasts a classic rock format branded as 92.9 The Bear.

== History ==
=== 92.9 license ===
The station was assigned the call letters KOLT-FM on February 7, 2007. It was known previously as a Regional Mexican, prior to that a country music station, and the original frequency to KMOR-FM in Scottsbluff, Nebraska, which broadcast a classic rock format before the move to Cheyenne.

As of 2016, it operated with a hot adult contemporary format as 92.9 The Boss. KOLT-FM was acquired by iHeartMedia in January 2016, after its previous owner, Tracy Broadcasting Company, defaulted on a loan and was repossessed by the Valley Bank & Trust. In April 2016, the station flipped to adult contemporary as Star 92.9, and adopted the call letters KYWY (the KOLT-FM calls were then assumed by a sister country station).

=== KPAW intellectual unit ===
On July 27, 1975, KCOL-FM first signed on. It was the sister station to AM 1410 KCOL (now on AM 600). KCOL-FM aired a beautiful music format. In 1988, the station switched to a Top 40 format as KIMN, which were the call letters of a popular Top 40 station in Denver in past years. The station took the call letters KPAW in 1995, at first keeping its Top 40 sound, then moving to classic hits around 2000, and later to classic rock.

On December 5, 2017, iHeartMedia moved KPAW's intellectual unit and call sign to the 92.9 frequency (formerly held by sister station KYWY, which moved its adult contemporary format to KOLT-HD2 and translator station K246CI), so it could shift KBPI's programming to 107.9 from 106.7 (which briefly warehoused the KYWY calls before flipping to country music as KWBL) to form a trimulcast (107.9 KDZA in Colorado Springs also flipped to a simulcast of KBPI, while the station operates a translator on 107.9 in Denver), which officially launched on December 11, 2017. iHeartMedia promoted that this change strengthened the station's signal and reach.
