= KOLT-FM =

Radio station in Cheyenne, Wyoming

- Cheyenne, Wyoming; United States
- Broadcast area: Cheyenne, Wyoming; Fort Collins-Greeley
- Frequency: 100.7 MHz (HD Radio)
- Branding: 100.7 KOLT FM

Programming
- Format: Country
- Subchannels: HD2: Adult contemporary

Ownership
- Owner: iHeartMedia, Inc.; (iHM Licenses, LLC)
- Sister stations: K235BT, K246CI, K297AK, KBPI, KCOL, KIIX, KPAW, KSME, KXBG

History
- First air date: 1979
- Former call signs: KLEN-FM (1979–1980); KKAZ (1980–1996); KOLZ (1996–2016)

Technical information
- Licensing authority: FCC
- Facility ID: 30225
- Class: C1
- ERP: 100,000 watts
- HAAT: 202 meters (663 ft)
- Transmitter coordinates: 41°2′55″N 104°53′28″W}}
- Translator: HD2: 97.1 K246CI (Cheyenne)

Links
- Public license information: Public file; LMS
- Webcast: Listen live (via iHeartRadio); Listen live (via iHeartRadio) (HD2)
- Website: koltfm.iheart.com; star971.iheart.com (HD2)

KOLT-FM (100.7 FM) is a radio station broadcasting a country music format. Licensed to Cheyenne, Wyoming, United States, the station serves the Cheyenne area, complementing sister country station KXBG. The station is currently owned by iHeartMedia, Inc., through licensee iHM Licenses, LLC. The station is recognized within the Country radio industry for having a strong market share in the Cheyenne area.

== History ==
The station was previously known as KLEN-FM, beginning on September 26, 1979. On November 4, 1980, the station changed its call sign to KKAZ; then on December 9, 1996 to KOLZ.

In August 2014, the station shifted to its current Country format and adopted the "KOLT 100.7" branding, using the slogan "Cheyenne's Continuous Country". The KOLT-FM call sign was officially adopted on March 30, 2016.

== Programming ==
KOLT-FM carries syndicated content, including the popular Country morning show, "The Bobby Bones Show".

Previous logo
