= KIIX (AM) =

- Fort Collins, Colorado; United States
- Broadcast area: Fort Collins–Loveland
- Frequency: 1410 kHz
- Branding: KIIX AM 1410

Programming
- Format: Classic country

Ownership
- Owner: iHeartMedia, Inc.; (iHM Licenses, LLC)
- Sister stations: K235BT, K246CI, K297AK, KBPI, KCOL, KOLT-FM, KPAW, KSME, KXBG

History
- First air date: March 1947
- Former call signs: KCOL (1947–1999)
- Call sign meaning: pronounced "kicks"

Technical information
- Licensing authority: FCC
- Facility ID: 68966
- Class: B
- Power: 1,000 watts
- Transmitter coordinates: 40°35′34″N 105°6′18″W

Links
- Public license information: Public file; LMS
- Webcast: Listen Live
- Website: https://kiixcountry.iheart.com/

KIIX (1410 AM) is a radio station broadcasting a classic country format. Licensed to Fort Collins, Colorado, United States, it serves the Ft. Collins-Greeley area. The station is owned by iHeartMedia, Inc., who acquired the station from Jacor in May 1999.

== History ==
The station that first carried the KIIX call sign was licensed to Fort Collins and broadcast on 600 kHz (now KCOL licensed to Wellington). That facility signed on in 1959 as KZIX. In the mid-1970s, while broadcasting a Country music format, the station switched its call sign to KIIX.

The 1410 facility signed on in March 1947 under the call sign KCOL. KCOL was originally licensed to operate on 1400 kHz but moved to its current frequency of 1410 kHz in 1950.

During the 1970s, KCOL (1410 AM) was the sister station to KCOL-FM (107.9 MHz) and was often associated with a Middle-of-the-Road (MOR) or Full-Service format..

KIIX was acquired by the media company Jacor (which was subsequently acquired by Clear Channel Communications in 1999). It is now iHeartMedia. In 1998, Clear Channel Communications acquired KIIX (then still on 600 kHz) and several other stations in the Fort Collins market. The call sign KIIX was moved from 600 kHz to the 1410 kHz facility.

=== Expanded Band assignment ===
On March 17, 1997, the Federal Communications Commission (FCC) announced that eighty-eight stations had been given permission to move to newly available "Expanded Band" transmitting frequencies, ranging from 1610 to 1700 kHz, with KCOL authorized to move from 1410 to 1670 kHz.. However, the station never procured the Construction Permit needed to implement the authorization, so the expanded band station was never built.

The station aired the America's Best Music format syndicated by Dial Global until a format change to classic country on April 2, 2012.
