= K246CI =

Relays KOLT-HD2, Cheyenne
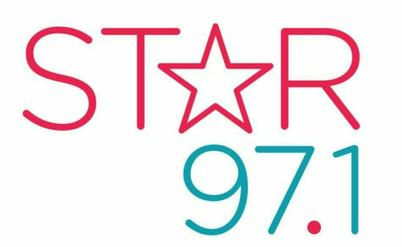
- Cheyenne, Wyoming; United States
- Broadcast area: Cheyenne, Wyoming
- Frequency: 97.1 MHz
- Branding: Star 97.1

Programming
- Format: Adult contemporary
- Affiliations: Premiere Networks

Ownership
- Owner: iHeartMedia; (iHM Licenses, LLC)
- Sister stations: KBPI, KCOL, KIIX, KPAW, KSME, KXBG, KOLT-FM, K235BT, K297AK

History
- First air date: November 2015

Technical information
- Licensing authority: FCC
- Facility ID: 158012
- Class: D
- ERP: 250 watts
- HAAT: 2 meters (6.6 ft)
- Transmitter coordinates: 41°8′8.93″N 104°48′9.08″W

Links
- Public license information: Public file; LMS
- Webcast: Listen live (via iHeartRadio)
- Website: star971.iheart.com

K246CI (97.1 FM) is a radio station translator in Cheyenne, Wyoming. Owned by iHeartMedia, the station simulcasts an adult contemporary music format branded as Star 97.1 from an HD Radio subchannel of KOLT-FM.

The station formerly operated on the full-power signal KYWY; in December 2017, the intellectual property of sister station KPAW was moved to its signal to facilitate the construction of a KBPI trimulcast, and KYWY's format and branding moved to KOLT-HD2 and K246CI, taking its branding from the latter.

== History ==
K246CI signed on in November 2015 as an oldies station, branded "Real Oldies 97.1", and fed by the HD2 channel of sister station KOLZ (now KOLT-FM).

The "Star" adult contemporary format originated in April 2016 on 92.9 FM as KYWY. That station, which had been hot adult contemporary station "92.9 The Boss" under the call sign KOLT-FM, was acquired by iHeartMedia in January 2016, after its previous owner, Tracy Broadcasting Company, defaulted on a loan and was repossessed by the Valley Bank & Trust; the KOLT-FM calls were transferred to KOLZ.

In December 2017, iHeartMedia re-aligned its cluster in the Cheyenne-Fort Collins-Greeley area in order to form a KBPI trimulcast on the 107.9 frequency in Fort Collins, Denver, and Colorado Springs. The intellectual unit and call sign of 107.9 KPAW was moved to 92.9, replacing the "Star" format (which had shifted to all-Christmas music for the holiday season). The "Star" brand and format was then moved to an HD Radio subchannel of KOLT-FM and its analog translator 97.1 K246CI, as "Star 97.1", replacing its previous "Real Oldies 97.1" format.
