= KBPI =

Active rock radio station in Fort Collins, Colorado, United States

- Fort Collins, Colorado; United States
- Broadcast area: Northern Colorado; Cheyenne, Wyoming; Denver metropolitan area
- Frequency: 107.9 MHz (HD Radio)
- Branding: 107-9 KBPI

Programming
- Format: Active rock

Ownership
- Owner: iHeartMedia; (iHM Licenses, LLC)
- Sister stations: KCOL, KIIX, KOLT-FM, KPAW, KSME, KXBG, K235BT, K246CI, KBCO, KHOW, KDFD, KOA, KDHT, KRFX, KTCL, KWBL

History
- First air date: July 27, 1975
- Former call signs: KCOL-FM (1975–1988); KIMN (1988–1995); KPAW (1995–2017)
- Call sign meaning: Bill Pierson Incorporated (original owner and calls of current-day KALC; started on 105.9 FM)

Technical information
- Licensing authority: FCC
- Facility ID: 68976
- Class: C1
- ERP: 100,000 watts
- HAAT: 266 meters (873 ft)
- Transmitter coordinates: 40°53′41.6″N 105°11′51.3″W
- Translators: 107.9 K300CP (Denver, relays KDHT-HD2)
- Repeater: 95.7 KDHT-HD2 (Denver)

Links
- Public license information: Public file; LMS
- Webcast: Listen live (via iHeartRadio)
- Website: kbpi.iheart.com

KBPI (107.9 FM, "107-9 KBPI") is a commercial radio station licensed to Fort Collins, Colorado, United States. It is owned by iHeartMedia and it broadcasts an active rock radio format.

KBPI's studios are located in Denver in the Tech Center. In December 2017, iHeartMedia assembled a trimulcast of KBPI along the Interstate 25 corridor on the 107.9 frequency, by moving KBPI's main signal to 107.9 in Fort Collins, as well as to translator station K300CP in Denver, and switching KDZA in Pueblo/Colorado Springs to a simulcast of KBPI.

== History ==
KBPI started on 105.9 MHz in Denver on June 21, 1965. It had studios on the 20th floor of the Daniels & Fisher Tower in downtown Denver. The owner and general manager of the station was Bill Pierson, who named KBPI for "Bill Pierson Incorporated". The station featured a progressive rock format. Pierson sold the station in 1974. The station continued its rock format under the new owner, Progressive Broadcasters, Incorporated.

During the 1970s and 1980s, the station moved to an album-oriented rock (AOR) sound. Its television commercials featured a blonde woman lip synching with bits of popular rock songs and DJ's voices, and the tagline KBPI Rocks the Rockies! (elongated with rolling R sounds). This catchphrase is still used in advertising and for a while the campaign was used at other rock radio stations in the United States and Canada. The "blonde woman" AKA "KBPI's Remarkable Mouth" was Kelly Harmon, sister of actor Mark Harmon.

During the 1970s, KBPI gained press for inviting people to bring their disco records to the station office for destruction, and this was frequently broadcast live over the air to the tune of Black Sabbath songs. This was commonplace among AOR stations who were riding the anti-Disco theme at the time. For four years, Steven B. and the Hawk ruled the Denver morning FM ratings, mixing rock music with their witty comments and routines. As they put it, "It really didn't matter what kind of music they played. Listeners tuned in to hear them."

Their comedic style was highlighted by a self-deprecating sense of humor, rather than "shock jock talk". The duo ridiculed the entertainment industry, regularly parodying movie and TV stars. One of their favorite routines was an ongoing spoof of soap operas. They created their own ongoing series, whose titles were partially taken from the real shows that aired at the time: Edge of Guiding Days of My Children Turning Hospital. They also did commercials featuring "Whamco" products and promotions.

Don Hawkins died unexpectedly in November 1994, following a routine surgery. Steven B. Williams, who had become a nationally prominent voiceover artist for television stations and networks including Nick at Nite and moved to California, was found dead of a gunshot wound in May 2006 off Catalina Island, and a business associate who embezzled the inheritance of Williams's father was convicted of his murder in 2011.

On April 20, 1994, Chancellor Media moved KBPI to 106.7 FM, which had been the home of KAZY, its long-time rock competitor and a former sister station to KLZ-AM-TV. Notable DJs include Willie B., DMac, Marc Stout, Scoop, Missy, Uncle Nasty, Matt Need, Double A Ron, Dan, Tim Bourke, Eddie, Joe the Russian and B Lo.

=== Move to 106.7 ===
106.7 FM signed the air on June 19, 1962, as KLZ-FM. At first it simulcast its AM counterpart KLZ, but in the early 1970s, it started airing a rock format. In 1977, KLZ-FM changed its call sign to KAZY (now at 93.7 FM in Cheyenne, Wyoming) and continued with a rock format until KBPI moved to the frequency on April 20, 1994 (105.9 would then flip to hot AC as KALC).

Dean and Rog hosted the KBPI Morning Show from 1991 to 1996. They were known for features like "The Birthday Scam" and "Torture Tuesday", as well as other stunts. In 1996, the duo and two other station employees were charged with disorderly conduct for entering a mosque while playing "The Star-Spangled Banner" on a trumpet and trombone. This was in response to Nuggets player Mahmoud Abdul-Rauf's refusal to stand for the anthem before games.

After more than twenty years with a mainstream album rock format, KBPI shifted to active rock in late 1995, calling its new format "The New Music Revolution". At the time, KBPI had an alternative rock lean. A few years later, KBPI would bring back the old slogan "Rocks the Rockies".

In 2007, the station was nominated for Radio & Records' Industry Achievement Award for best active rock station in a top 25 market.

=== Move to 107.9 ===
On July 27, 1975, 107.9 FM first signed on as KCOL-FM. It was the sister station to KCOL (1410 AM). KCOL-FM aired a beautiful music format. In 1988, the station switched to a Top 40 format as KIMN, which were the call letters of a popular Top 40 station in Denver in past years. The station took the call letters KPAW in 1995, at first keeping its Top 40 format, then moving to classic hits around 2000, and later to classic rock.

In December 2017, iHeartMedia launched a trimulcast of KBPI, utilizing the analog 107.9 frequency across several markets in the Interstate 25 corridor. On December 5, the programming and call letters of classic rock KPAW, which targets Fort Collins and the Northern Front Range, was moved to KYWY (92.9) in Cheyenne, Wyoming (which moved its adult contemporary format to KOLT-FM HD2 (100.7-HD2) and translator station K246CI (97.1) four days prior).

On December 11, KBPI's programming and call letters then moved to the 107.9 frequency vacated by KPAW and co-channel Denver translator K300CP, while sister station KDZA in Pueblo, which also serves Colorado Springs, flipped to a simulcast of KBPI (and switched their calls to KBPL the following month). The previous 106.7 signal, which warehoused the KYWY call letters, simulcasted KBPI for a week before flipping to country as KWBL on December 18, 2017. KBPL partially broke away from the trimulcast in January 2019, reintroducing local hosts in the afternoon and nighttime dayparts, and carrying a separate playlist.

=== K300CP history ===
The K300CP translator launched early as 2015 in as an FM translator of KOA (850) until November 1, 2015, when KOA was switched to the newly-acquired K231BQ (94.1). After a simulcast of Christmas music from the HD2 subchannel of KRFX (103.5) through the holidays, it began to translate the sports radio format of KDSP (760) until December 11, 2017, when it converted to a simulcast of KDHT-HD2. The translator is not owned by iHeartMedia, but the WAY-FM Network through their Hope Media Group licensing subsidiary.
