= KRFX =

- Denver, Colorado; United States
- Broadcast area: Denver metropolitan area
- Frequency: 103.5 MHz (HD Radio)
- Branding: 103.5 The Fox

Programming
- Format: Mainstream rock
- Subchannels: HD2: KHOW simulcast (talk)
- Affiliations: Denver Broncos

Ownership
- Owner: iHeartMedia; (iHM Licenses, LLC)
- Sister stations: KBCO, KBPI, KDFD, KHOW, KOA, KDHT, KTCL, KWBL

History
- First air date: June 1, 1961
- Former call signs: KOA-FM (1960–1974); KOAQ (1974–1989)
- Call sign meaning: "Fox"

Technical information
- Facility ID: 29731
- Class: C0
- ERP: 100,000 watts
- HAAT: 346 meters (1,135 ft)
- Transmitter coordinates: 39°43′59.00″N 105°14′10.00″W

Links
- Webcast: Listen Live; Listen Live (HD2)
- Website: thefox.iheart.com

KRFX (103.5 FM) is an American commercial radio station in Denver, Colorado, serving the Denver metropolitan area. It is owned by iHeartMedia, and airs a mainstream rock radio format. The KRFX studios and offices are located on South Monaco Street in the Denver Tech Center. The station transmitter is atop Lookout Mountain, near Golden, more than 7,000 feet (2256 m) above sea level and 1,135 feet (346 m) in height above average terrain. Its effective radiated power is 100,000 watts.

KRFX broadcasts in the HD Radio format, with its HD2 subchannel simulcasting the programming of co-owned talk station KHOW. KRFX can also be heard online via iHeartRadio.

== History ==
=== KOA-FM (1961–1968) ===
On June 1, 1961, the station first signed on as KOA-FM, the FM counterpart to KOA. Both stations were owned by the Metropolitan Television Company.

The two stations simulcast a full service middle of the road (MOR) format, with CBS Radio News at the beginning of most hours. KOA-AM-FM shared broadcast facilities at 1044 Lincoln Street, three blocks south of the state capitol, with their co-owned television station, KOA-TV (now KCNC).

=== Beautiful music (1968–1974) ===
After several years, the simulcast ended, and KOA-FM began airing a beautiful music format. In July 1968, KOA-AM-FM-TV was purchased by General Electric Broadcasting.

=== Top 40 (1974–1986) ===
In 1974, KOA-FM flipped to Top 40 as "Q103" KOAQ. As listening to hit music switched from AM to FM, Q103 became one of Denver's top-rated stations during the 1980s. Jack Regan was the station's long-time program director and morning DJ. Alan Sledge was the music director, and midday DJ. He later added assistant PD duties. Vic Martin held down afternoons until 1982, followed by Barry James of Yes95! in Cincinnati. James took over MD/APD duties upon Sledge's departure. James left in 1988, and was followed by Bill Hessin, who a few years earlier had worked nights on KIMN as "Long John Ball". Other Q103 personalities included Nick Sommers, Tom Chase (Tom Villagrana), Don MacLeod and Scott Morrison.

In September 1983, General Electric sold KOA and KOAQ to the A. H. Belo Corporation of Dallas for $22 million. Lee Larson was selected as the new general manager, coming to Denver from KLOS in Los Angeles. In June 1984, KOA and KOAQ moved to new offices and studios located at 1380 Lawrence Street, leaving their TV sister station at the Lincoln Street facility.

=== Adult contemporary (1986–1989) ===
With KOAQ competing with two rival Top 40 stations in 1986, the station segued to an adult contemporary music format.

In 1987, Jacor Communications purchased KOA and KOAQ for $24 million. Bob Visotcky was appointed general manager of KOAQ, while Lee Larson continued at the helm of KOA.

=== Classic rock (1989–2025) ===
Logo under previous slogan and format

After nearly 14 years playing some kind of pop music format, on January 18, 1989, KOAQ flipped to classic rock, taking the new call sign KRFX, and rebranded as "103.5 The Fox", one of several stations in the U.S. using the brand "The Fox".

In late 1995, when sister station KBPI began playing mostly new active rock, KRFX added some more recent rock titles. At the same time, air personality Steve Cooper of KBPI replaced Tom Little at night.

In May 1999, Clear Channel Communications acquired KOA and KRFX when Jacor stations were absorbed by the company. In 2014, Clear Channel switched its name to iHeartMedia.

=== Mainstream rock (2025-present) ===
In November 2025, KRFX shifted to mainstream rock by adding more 90s and 2000s rock titles, while maintaining the "Fox" branding.
