= KCOL (AM) =

- Wellington, Colorado; United States
- Broadcast area: Fort Collins–Greeley–Loveland–Boulder–Longmont, Colorado and Cheyenne, Wyoming
- Frequency: 600 kHz
- Branding: 600 KCOL

Programming
- Format: News/talk
- Affiliations: Fox News Radio; Compass Media Networks; Premiere Networks

Ownership
- Owner: iHeartMedia, Inc.; (iHM Licenses, LLC)
- Sister stations: K235BT, K246CI, KBPI, KIIX, KOLT-FM, KPAW KSME, KXBG

History
- First air date: January 12, 1959 (as KZIX Fort Collins)
- Former call signs: KZIX (1959–1975); KIIX (1975–1999)
- Call sign meaning: Colorado

Technical information
- Licensing authority: FCC
- Facility ID: 68685
- Class: B
- Power: 5,000 watts day 500 watts night
- Transmitter coordinates: 40°39′0″N 105°02′51″W

Links
- Public license information: Public file; LMS
- Webcast: Listen Live
- Website: 600kcol.iheart.com

KCOL (600 kHz) is a commercial AM radio station licensed to Wellington, Colorado, and serving the Fort Collins-Greeley radio market. The station airs a news/talk format and is owned by iHeartMedia, Inc. The studios and offices are on Byrd Drive in Loveland, while the transmitter is off North County Road 13 in Fort Collins.

Weekdays begin with a local news and information show, Mornings with Jimmy Lakey. The rest of the weekday schedule is made up of syndicated talk shows, including Rush Limbaugh, Sean Hannity, Glenn Beck, Mark Levin, Clyde Lewis, Coast to Coast AM with George Noory and This Morning, America's First News with Gordon Deal. Weekends feature shows on health, money, religion, home repair and technology, some of which are paid brokered programming. Weekend hosts include Gary Sullivan, Leo Laporte, Joe Pags and Bill Cunningham. Most hours begin with Fox News Radio.

== History ==
On January 12, 1959, the station signed on as KZIX, originally licensed to Fort Collins. It was a 1,000–watt daytimer, required to go off the air at sunset to protect other stations that use the same 600 AM channel.

In August 1965, KZIX was acquired by Poudre Valley Broadcasting. The following month, it signed on an FM station, 93.3 KFMF (now KTCL Wheat Ridge). In the 1970s, KZIX broadcast a country music format. It switched its call sign to KIIX. In the 1980s, it increased its power to 5,000 watts and added nighttime service at 500 watts, while also changing its city of license to Wellington, just north of Fort Collins. It continued to air country music in the daytime but also added syndicated talk shows at night from NBC Talknet.

In 1998, Clear Channel Communications, a forerunner of current owner iHeartMedia, paid $6.1 million to acquire KIIX and alternative rock KTCL. KIIX's format switched to soft oldies and adult standards. On November 5, 1999, Clear Channel flipped the call letters of two of its Fort Collins-area stations. AM 600 KIIX became KCOL. Meanwhile, the station at AM 1410 that had been KCOL now was called KIIX. KCOL switched to its current talk format, while KIIX began broadcasting a sports radio format.
