= KTCL =

Radio station in Wheat Ridge–Denver, Colorado

- Wheat Ridge, Colorado; United States
- Broadcast area: Denver metropolitan area
- Frequency: 93.3 MHz (HD Radio)
- Branding: Channel 93-3

Programming
- Format: Alternative rock
- Subchannels: HD2: Punk rock
- Affiliations: Compass Media Networks

Ownership
- Owner: iHeartMedia; (iHM Licenses, LLC)
- Sister stations: KBCO, KBPI, KHOW, KDFD, KOA, KDHT, KRFX, KWBL

History
- First air date: September 1965
- Former call signs: KFMF (1965–1970); KIIX-FM (1970–1975)
- Call sign meaning: Station was previously licensed to Fort Collins

Technical information
- Facility ID: 68684
- Class: C1
- ERP: 71,000 watts
- HAAT: 346 meters (1,135 ft)
- Transmitter coordinates: 39°43′59.00″N 105°14′12.00″W

Links
- Webcast: Listen live (via iHeartRadio); Listen live (HD2)
- Website: ktcl.iheart.com

KTCL (93.3 FM) is a radio station licensed to Wheat Ridge, Colorado, United States. Owned by iHeartMedia, it broadcasts an alternative rock format targeting the Denver metro area. Its studios are located alongside iHeartMedia's other Denver stations at 4695 S Monaco St. in the Tech Center, while its transmitter is located in Golden.

The station broadcasts in HD Radio, with a subchannel carrying a punk rock format branded as Punk Tacos.

== History ==
=== Early years ===
The station originated as KZIX-FM in Fort Collins, Colorado. and began operating in 1965. In July,1965, its owners requested a change of call letters to KFMF, which had been adopted by late September 1965. Operating as KFMF, the station received its first broadcast license on December 12 1965. In 1975, changed its call sign from KIIX-FM to KTCL. By 1978, the station was operating under the call sign, KTCL. Although the station's call sign changed over time, it remained the same 93.3 FM facility throughout.

It simulcasted the Top 40 format of KIIX AM 600 (now on 1410, the old 600 frequency is now KCOL).

In the 1970s, the station became KIIX-FM and adopted a freeform progressive music format. It changed its calls to KTCL in 1975 and evolved to the modern rock format in the mid 1980s. The station was known as "The Adventure." For a time, KTCL branded itself as "World Famous KTCL 93.3".

=== 1995–present ===
KTCL, part of a joint sales agreement with KBPI and KRFX in 1995, moved to a more pop-oriented direction when KBPI began playing more new rock. In the late 90s, the station dropped its longtime name "The Adventure" in favor of "Channel 93-3." In 2001, KTCL aired the daily program Martha Quinn's Rewind along with at least four other stations owned by Clear Channel.

KTCL airplay was noted for having helped launch several local alternative bands, including Love .45, Flobots, 3OH!3, The Fray, and Tickle Me Pink.
