= KDHT (FM) =

Contemporary hit radio station in Denver

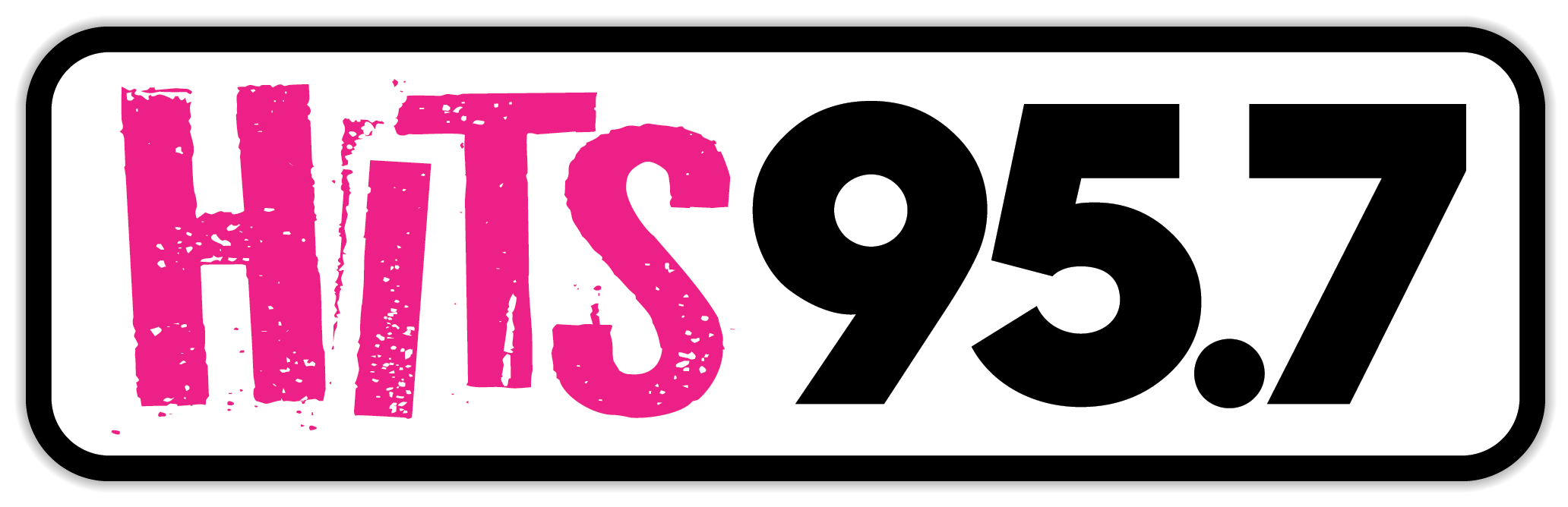
- Denver, Colorado; United States
- Broadcast area: Denver–Boulder
- Frequency: 95.7 MHz (HD Radio)
- Branding: Hits 95-7

Programming
- Format: Contemporary hit radio
- Subchannels: HD2: Simulcast of KBPI (active rock)
- Affiliations: Premiere Networks

Ownership
- Owner: iHeartMedia; (iHM Licenses, LLC)
- Sister stations: KBCO; KBPI; KDFD; KHOW; KOA; KRFX; KTCL; KWBL

History
- First air date: December 15, 1966
- Former call signs: KMYR (1966–1975); KHOW-FM (1975–1976); KXKX (1976–1980); KHOW-FM (1980–1983); KPKE (1983–1987); KSYY (1987–1991); KHOW-FM (1991–1993); KHIH (1993–2000); KFMD (2000–2005); KMGG (2005–2006); KPTT (2006–2022)
- Former frequencies: 95.5 MHz (1966–1970)
- Call sign meaning: "Denver's Hits"

Technical information
- Licensing authority: FCC
- Facility ID: 48967
- Class: C0
- ERP: 100,000 watts
- HAAT: 346 meters (1,135 ft)
- Transmitter coordinates: 39°43′59″N 105°14′10″W
- Translators: 101.7 K269CL (Evergreen); HD2: 107.9 K300CP (Denver)

Links
- Public license information: Public file; LMS
- Webcast: Listen live (via iHeartRadio); HD2: Listen live (via iHeartRadio); HD3: Listen live (via iHeartRadio)
- Website: hits957.iheart.com; HD2: kbpi.iheart.com

KDHT (95.7 MHz) is a commercial radio station in Denver, Colorado. KDHT broadcasts a contemporary hit radio format branded as "Hits 95-7", and is owned by iHeartMedia. The station has studios and offices on South Monaco Street in the Denver Tech Center, while the transmitter site is atop Lookout Mountain in Golden.

KDHT has an effective radiated power (ERP) of 100,000 watts. KDHT broadcasts in the HD Radio format, with its HD2 subchannel simulcasting KBPI's active rock format.

== History ==
=== KMYR (1966–1968) ===
On December 15, 1966, the station signed on as KMYR. The station originally broadcast at 95.5 MHz at 51,000 watts, about half the power it has today. It was owned by Karlo Broadcasting, Ltd. KMYR aired middle of the road music and carried news from ABC Radio.

KMYR moved to its current frequency, 95.7 MHz, in 1970, and also increased its power to current level, 100,000 watts. In 1975, it was acquired by Doubleday Broadcasting, which had bought one of Denver's top AM stations, KHOW, in 1968.

=== KHOW-FM (1968–1977) ===
After the closing of the sale, KMYR's call sign was switched to KHOW-FM. The two stations simulcasted some of their news and music, but Federal Communications Commission rules at the time required AM and FM stations to broadcast separate programming for most of the day.

=== KXKX (1977–1980) ===
From 1977 to 1980, it aired a Top 40 format as KXKX.

=== KHOW-FM (1980–1983) ===
In 1980, the station returned to the KHOW-FM call letters, and flipped to a progressive rock format.

=== KPKE (1983–1987) ===
On July 19, 1983, the station returned to Top 40 music as "All Hit 96 KPKE"'. For a time, KPKE had some of the highest ratings in the market. In April 1986, Legacy Broadcasting, owned by Robert F.X. Sillerman, bought KPKE and KHOW.

=== KSYY (1987–1991) ===
In June 1987, KPKE changed to soft adult contemporary, this time as KSYY, "Sunny 95.7." Over the next several years, KHOW and KSYY changed hands several times. In April 1988, the stations were bought by Metropolitan Broadcasting, formerly Metromedia. Two months later, Command Communications bought the stations. In November 1989, Viacom bought KHOW and KSYY.

=== KHOW-FM (1991–1993) ===
On February 4, 1991, KSYY changed call letters back to KHOW-FM and began an AM-FM simulcast with KHOW.

=== KHIH (1993–2000) ===
In October 1993, shortly after Noble Broadcast Group acquired the station, KHOW-FM adopted a smooth jazz format and the call letters KHIH. (KHIH was originally on 94.7 FM until Salem purchased the station that same month and dropped it for a Christian Talk/Teaching format.) KHOW meanwhile flipped to a News/Talk format which has been the format to the present day, in spite of staff and personality changes over the years.

In 1996, Noble merged with Jacor, taking advantage of the Telecommunications Act of 1996, allowing one company to own several radio stations in the same market, no longer limited to one AM and one FM. In 1999, Jacor merged with Clear Channel Communications, now known as iHeartMedia.

=== KFMD (2000–2005) ===
On September 1, 2000, 95.7 returned to contemporary hits as KFMD, "95.7 KISS FM", giving the market its first Mainstream Top 40 outlet since KHHT's demise in 1997. (The smooth jazz format was picked up by KCKK 104.3 later that day.) However, with competition from Rhythmic Top 40 KQKS and Adult Top 40 KALC, ratings for KFMD were not impressive.

=== KMGG (2005–2006) ===
On April 27, 2005, KFMD changed call letters to KMGG, and flipped to a Hispanic Urban format as "Mega 95.7."

KMGG was one of four FM stations targeting the Mile High City's Hispanic population, the other three being KJMN, KKCS and KXPK; unlike the latter three, KMGG was more focused on the bilingual-speaking second and third generation Hispanics. In addition, KMGG took advantage of KQKS's decision to hold off on certain Reggaeton and Hispanic hip hop tracks. However, the format did not help the station's popularity, as KMGG was continually ranked low in the Arbitron ratings.

=== KPTT (2006–2021) ===
Second logo as The Party

On September 18, 2006, at Midnight, after ending its "Sunday Night Sabor" show and playing "My Way" by Frank Sinatra, KMGG flipped to a Rhythmic Adult Contemporary format targeting females ages 25–49, branded as "95.7 The Party." The first song was P!nk's "Get The Party Started." The KPTT call letters were adopted on October 18, 2006.

As a Rhythmic AC, the station's playlist consisted of current and recurrent upbeat rhythmic and pop tracks, and old school hip hop and R&B, as well as some classic dance and disco tracks. KPTT primarily targeted the older audience of KQKS (as well as the market's other adult contemporary-oriented stations), and was the first adult-oriented rhythmic outlet in Denver since KDJM flipped in December 2005.

KPTT aired a Sunday-Thursday night slow jams program called "Between The Sheets", as well as the syndicated LGBTQ-oriented "Radio with a Twist" on weekends. The station also served as the Denver outlet for Whoopi Goldberg's national morning show, "Wake Up with Whoopi", which was syndicated by Premiere Networks, co-owned with KPTT by Clear Channel Communications. The show was cancelled in 2008.

During the summer of 2009, KPTT transitioned from rhythmic AC to rhythmic hot AC, and then to a rhythmic-leaning Top 40/CHR format. Morning show host Issa, who took over the morning drive slot after the cancellation of Whoopi's show, was moved to middays and was replaced by Johnjay & Rich, who are syndicated from KZZP in Phoenix.

By March 2010, KPTT shifted to Rhythmic Top 40 altogether, thus putting it in direct competition with KQKS. On November 1, 2010, Johnjay & Rich were dropped from morning drive and were replaced with a music-intensive morning show hosted by former night host Chino. At the same time, the station introduced a new logo, which was loosely based on sister KYLD in San Francisco. This shift to Rhythmic Top 40 proved to be successful for a few years, giving KQKS a serious competitor.

In the fall of 2014, KPTT evolved back to a more mainstream Top 40 direction with the inclusion of pop tracks in its playlist, while maintaining a Rhythmic presentation. The adjustment helped the station overtake KQKS in terms of ratings and audience cumes. The transition became official in April 2015, when Billboard moved KPTT from the Rhythmic panel to the Top 40/CHR panel; Mediabase followed suit in May 2015. The following month, KPTT adopted the slogan "Denver's #1 Hit Music Station."

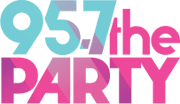
Third logo as "The Party"

In November 2015, the station brought in a new morning show, hosted by JJ Kincaid (from sister station WHTZ in New York), Deanna Regalado and producer Robert 'Dubz' Trigilio. Regalado would move to middays in May 2018, and was replaced with Nina Blanco. Kincaid would be released from the station in April 2019, and replaced with David 'Deuce' Jacobson.

=== KDHT (2021–present) ===
On July 2, 2021, morning hosts David 'Deuce' Jacobson, Nina Blanco, and Robert 'Dubz' Trigilio were released from the station. This, combined with the recent registration of new web domains by iHeart as early as mid-May, suggested KPTT would undergo a significant overhaul of its format, as the station dropped to 19th place with a 2.0 share in the May 2021 Nielsen Audio ratings for the market. Shortly before midnight on July 14, after playing "Only Human" by Jonas Brothers, KPTT began stunting, playing only music by Britney Spears as "Free Britney Radio", as the stunt took place during her ongoing conservatorship court dispute, the next hearing which would take place that afternoon. KPTT also promoted a change to take place the following day at noon. At the promised time, KPTT relaunched their Top 40/CHR format as "Hits 95.7". The new format jabbed KQKS and KALC upon launch, as "Hits 95.7" would be positioned between the two stations. The first song after the relaunch was "Good 4 U" by Olivia Rodrigo.

In August 2021, KPTT became the Denver affiliate of the nationally syndicated "The Jubal Show", hosted by Jubal Fresh and co-hosts Alex Fresh and 'English' Evan Omelia, based at Seattle sister station KBKS.

On March 14, 2022, KPTT changed its callsign to KDHT; aside from adjusting to match the "Hot" branding, it also returned a heritage callsign to the area, as it had previously been used on 92.5 FM from 1989 to 1993, and on 107.1 FM from 2009 to 2014.

== HD Radio ==
In July 2006, KPTT's HD2 subcarrier signed on with a format focusing on Regional Mexican Oldies. In September 2006, the format was replaced with KPTT's previous Hispanic rhythmic format. This was later replaced with "Pride Radio", which targeted the LGBT community. In mid-2012, this was replaced with the dance radio format "Club Phusion"; which was in turn relaunched in 2013 as "Evolution".

On December 11, 2017, KBPI/Fort Collins began simulcasting the station's active rock format on KPTT-HD2's subchannel and on translator K300CP (107.9 FM) in Denver, which is a relay of KPTT-HD2. At the same time, KPTT moved the "Evolution" format from KPTT-HD2 to a new HD3 sub-channel.
