= KOA (AM) =

Clear-channel news/talk radio station in Denver

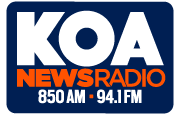
- Denver, Colorado; United States
- Broadcast area: Denver–Boulder–Colorado Springs
- Frequency: 850 kHz
- Branding: KOA 850 AM & 94.1 FM

Programming
- Format: News/talk
- Affiliations: NBC News Radio; Premiere Networks; ABC News Radio; Compass Media Networks; Fox News Radio; KCNC-TV; KDVR; Colorado Buffaloes Radio Network; Colorado Rockies Radio Network; Denver Broncos Radio Network

Ownership
- Owner: iHeartMedia; (iHM Licenses, LLC)
- Sister stations: KBCO; KBPI; KDFD; KHOW; KDHT; KRFX; KTCL; KWBL

History
- First air date: December 15, 1924

Technical information
- Licensing authority: FCC
- Facility ID: 29738
- Class: A
- Power: 50,000 watts unlimited (main antenna); 10,000 watts (auxiliary antenna)
- ERP: 250 watts (K231BQ); 205 watts (K231AA)
- Transmitter coordinates: 39°30′22″N 104°45′58.9″W (main antenna); 40°00′34″N 104°56′22″W (auxiliary antenna)
- Translators: 94.1 K231BQ (Golden); 94.1 K231AA (Boulder)

Links
- Public license information: Public file; LMS
- Webcast: Listen live (via iHeartRadio)
- Website: koacolorado.iheart.com

KOA (850 kHz) is a commercial AM radio station licensed to Denver, Colorado. Owned by iHeartMedia, it serves the Denver-Boulder media market. KOA broadcasts a news/talk radio format, and is also the flagship station of the Denver Broncos, Colorado Rockies and Colorado Buffaloes. KOA has its studios in Southeast Denver, while the transmitter site is off South Parker Road in Parker.

KOA is a Class A, clear-channel station, broadcasting at 50,000 watts non-directional, the maximum power permitted by the Federal Communications Commission for AM stations. By day, the station provides city-grade coverage to most of Colorado's densely populated area, including cities such as Colorado Springs, Pueblo and Fort Collins. It provides at least secondary coverage to most of eastern and central Colorado (as far west as Aspen), along with portions of Wyoming. Under the right conditions, it reaches almost all of Colorado, as well as portions of Nebraska and Kansas. With a good radio at night, the signal can be heard over much of the Central and Western United States, and parts of Canada and Mexico. KOA is nicknamed "the Blowtorch of the West". It is Colorado's primary entry point station for the Emergency Alert System.

As of November 1, 2015, KOA is also heard on 94.1 MHz K231BQ, which is licensed to Golden, Colorado, as an FM translator of KBCO-HD3. In addition, KOA also simulcasts on translator K231AA (also on 94.1 MHz), licensed to Boulder.

== History ==
KOA was first owned by General Electric (GE) and began broadcasting on December 15, 1924. The station started with 5,000 watts, and in 1927, increased to 12,500 watts. KOA became an NBC affiliate in 1929, and the network took over operation of the station from GE shortly thereafter. On July 7, 1934, power was raised to the current level of 50,000 watts. In 1941, NBC, which had been operating KOA and KGO in San Francisco for GE since October 1, 1929, also took over ownership of the stations. NBC continued to own KOA until June 1953 when it sold the station to Metropolitan Television Company, whose principal stockholder was Bob Hope. That same year on Christmas Eve, KOA started a sister TV station, KOA-TV on channel 4; like its radio cousin, it was affiliated with the NBC Television Network. KOA-FM was added in June 1961, which in 1974 became Top 40 KOAQ (Q103). GE repurchased the stations in 1968 and continued to own them until 1983 (keeping the aforementioned channel 4, which was subsequently rechristened as KCNC-TV), when it sold KOA and KOAQ to Belo Corporation. In 1987 Jacor Communications purchased KOA and KOAQ; Jacor was purchased by Clear Channel Communications in 1999. The company rebranded to iHeartMedia in 2014.

Former Rocky Mountain News columnist Mike Rosen, who retired at the end of 2015, was the long-running host of the 1 to 3 p.m. show. Rosen is a fiscal conservative and social libertarian who occasionally was a substitute host for Rush Limbaugh. Common Rosen-isms are "tell me where you sit before you tell me where you stand" and "a politician asks what you want, an economist asks what you want more". Rosen's philosophy is reflected in his recommended reading list which includes Ayn Rand, Adam Smith, Paul Johnson and Thomas Sowell.

Other well-known local voices previously heard on KOA include Bob Martin, Don Zimmer, Gus Mircos, and Alex Stone. Rollye James and George Weber. The late Rick Barber was heard for 30 years on KOA. Consumer advocate Tom Martino and former FEMA official Michael D. Brown were KOA hosts until they switched to sister station KHOW.

Radio host Alan Berg broadcast his talk show from the station, but was shot and killed by members of the white supremacist group The Order on June 18, 1984. Another host from an earlier era was Leigh Kamman, who hosted jazz programs during World War II. Kamman returned to his home state of Minnesota after the war. The Sports Zoo with Dave Logan and Scott Hastings ran for 12 years until Hastings left in April 2005 for the Altitude Sports and Entertainment network. Hastings resumed sports radio broadcasting on KKFN in January 2006 alongside former Denver Broncos lineman Alfred Williams. Ken Hamblin, "The Black Avenger", also hosted a popular and long-running show during the 1980s.

Also in the 1980s, during the weekend evening hours on KOA, Larry Cox, and his dog Wilbur, would host the radio program The National Recovery Act, a listener-friendly call-in show. A certain topic was announced and people from all over the nation, picking up the KOA signal at night, would call in with their memories. Big band music from the 1930s and 1940s was also played. The program would always end with the song "And So To Bed". In December 1987, Cox began a new radio program, No Place Like Home, broadcast from his home on Chicago Creek. Listeners would often hear the fireplace crackling and Cox's dog, Wilbur, snoring.

With the launch of conservative talk sister station KDFD "Freedom 93.7" in 2019, The Rush Limbaugh Show moved exclusively from KOA to KDFD in September 2019, and the station launched the new afternoon drive show Big Al & JoJo (co-hosted by former Denver Broncos player and KKFN host Alfred Williams), resulting in its existing sports show Logan & Lewis moving to late-mornings.

In June 2022, longtime co-anchor of Colorado's Morning News April Zesbaugh retired.

== Awards ==
KOA was one of ten stations honored at the 2007 NAB Crystal Radio Awards for public service awarded by the National Association of Broadcasters. Winners were honored at the radio luncheon on April 17, 2007, during the NAB Show in Las Vegas.

KOA was named "Large Market Station of the Year" at the 2008 National Association of Broadcasters' Marconi Radio Awards.

== See also ==
- List of three-letter broadcast call signs in the United States
- List of three-letter broadcast call signs in the United States
