= Trimulcast =

Three radio and/or television stations that play the same feed

In broadcasting, a trimulcast is a cluster of three radio and/or television stations and/or translators that play the same feed. Normally this is done in order to have full coverage of a certain area. Some stations use this technique to provide rimshot coverage into a major market by broadcasting on the outskirts from three different locations, or combine multiple low power television stations in an attempt to provide the equivalent coverage of one full-power station.

== Examples ==
- WGVX/WLUP/WWWM in Minneapolis, Minnesota make up Soft AC station Love 105 FM.
- KRXV, KHWY, and KHYZ cover the Mojave Desert from Barstow to Laughlin and Las Vegas, Nevada; they target listeners travelling to the two cities on Interstate 15 and Interstate 40 from Southern California, with their advertising focusing on businesses, resorts, and events in Southern Nevada. KHYZ later broke away from the trimulcast and switched to a separate dance radio format.
- KBPI/KBPL/K300CP cover the Colorado Interstate 25 corridor on 107.9 FM; in 2024, KBPL broke away from the trimulcast and introduced local hosts and a separate playlist, although it still uses the KBPI branding and shares some of its hosts with its parent station.
- In 1996, WCFT-TV/WJSU-TV formed a television trimulcast in the Anniston/Birmingham/Tuscaloosa, Alabama area to replace WBRC as the market's ABC affiliate when it switched to Fox. Allbritton Communications had acquired the full-powered WCFT in Tuscaloosa and entered into a local marketing agreement with WJSU in Aniston to serve as a simulcast covering the region. at the time Nielsen regarded all three cities as separate media markets—meaning that they were both considered out-of-market stations in Birmingham, and thus ineligible to be counted in local ratings. As a workaround, WBMA-LP was added to the arrangement to form the trimulcast, and classified as the originating station for WCFT and WJSU; the stations' on-air branding suggested otherwise, using WCFT and WJSU's channel numbers as "ABC 33/40".
