= K235BT =

Relays KSME-HD2, Greeley
- Fort Collins, Colorado; United States
- Broadcast area: Fort Collins, Colorado
- Frequency: 94.9 MHz
- Branding: Radio 94.9

Programming
- Format: Adult Alternative

Ownership
- Owner: Radio by Grace, Inc.
- Operator: iHeartMedia

Technical information
- Licensing authority: FCC
- Facility ID: 155948
- Class: D
- ERP: 99 watts
- HAAT: 333.9 meters (1,095 ft)

Links
- Public license information: Public file; LMS
- Webcast: iHeartRadio
- Website: radio949.iheart.com

K235BT (94.9 FM) is a radio station translator in Fort Collins, Colorado. Owned by Radio by Grace, Inc., and operated by iHeartMedia, the station simulcasts an Adult Alternative music format branded as Radio 94.9, as a relay an HD2 subchannel of KSME (moving from KPAW in December 2017 as part of iHeartMedia's larger station realignment in Colorado to form a KBPI trimulcast).

The station started broadcasting in October 2012 as "Christmas 94.9," the first station in Northern Colorado to begin playing Christmas music without any commercial interruptions. On December 26, the station began carrying Fox Sports Radio programming until May 16, 2013. The station reverted to playing Christmas music as "Christmas 94.9."

At noon on May 17, 2013, after "Do They Know It's Christmas?" by Band Aid, K235BT flipped to a AAA format as Radio 94.9. The first song played on Radio 94.9 was "It's Time" by Imagine Dragons.

In late January 2020, K235BT flipped to an alternative rock format described as "Adult Alternative", while keeping the "Radio 94.9" branding.
