= LSU Sports Radio Network =

Collegiate sports radio network

LSU Sports Network
- Type: Radio network
- Branding: LSU Sports Radio and Television Network
- Country: United States
- Availability: various AM and FM radio stations
- Headquarters: Baton Rouge, Louisiana
- Area: Statewide Louisiana central and southern Arkansas western Florida central and southern Mississippi eastern Texas
- Owner: LSU Sports Properties; Outfront Media
- Webcast: lsusports.net
- Official website: Radio network official Site; Television Network Affiliates official site

The LSU Sports Network is the radio and television network of the Louisiana State University Tigers and Lady Tigers men's and women's sports teams. It consists of eleven television stations, two regional cable networks, and several radio stations throughout the state of Louisiana and surrounding states. Its headquarters are located in Baton Rouge, Louisiana and it is owned by LSU Sports Properties.

WDGL 98.1 FM (Eagle 98.1) in Baton Rouge, Louisiana is the flagship station for football, men's basketball and baseball. WBRP 107.3 FM (Talk 107.3) in Baton Rouge, Louisiana is the flagship station for women's basketball and softball.

== On-air personalities ==
=== Current ===
As of the 2017–18 season:

Name	Position
Chris Blair	Play-by-play (baseball, men's basketball, football); Director of Broadcasting
Doug Thompson	Analyst (baseball, home games)
Bill Franques	Analyst (baseball, away games)
John Brady	Analyst (men's basketball)
Kevin Ford	Analyst/play-by-play (men's basketball); Studio host (football)
Doug Moreau	Analyst (football)
Gordy Rush	Sideline reporter (football)
Patrick Wright	Play-by-play (women's basketball, softball)
Kent Lowe	Analyst (softball)

=== Former "Voice of the Tigers" ===
- John Ferguson – Play-by-play commentator (men's basketball, football) (1946–1958, 1961–1987)
- J.C. Politz – Play-by-play commentator (men's basketball, football) (1959–1960)
- Jim Hawthorne – Play-by-play commentator (baseball, men's basketball, football) (1979–2016)

=== Former LSU radio analysts ===
- Walter Hill – Analyst (football) (1961–1986)

=== Former LSU Radio sideline reporters ===
- Jordy Hultberg (2002–2010)

== Programming ==
=== History ===
The LSU Athletic Department and LSU Sports Properties produces in-house weekly television and radio coaches shows. Sports covered are baseball, men's basketball, women's basketball, football, gymnastics and softball. Starting during 1999–2000 season, all coaches shows have been streamed live and made available on-demand on LSUsports.net. LSU was among the first universities to offer such a subscription-based service to its fans through what is now called the "Geaux Zone". Internet-only shows such as "The Dot TV Show" and "Tiger Talk" have also been offered as a supplement to the 30-minute coaches TV shows. In 2016, LSU began free streaming on-demand live game broadcasts and live video of certain non-game action like coaches’ television shows, news conferences and special presentations on LSUsports.net.

=== Coach's shows ===
==== Radio ====
- The Brian Kelly Show
- The Matt McMahon Show
- The Nikki Fargas Show
- The Paul Mainieri Show
- LSU Sixty
- Fresh Take with Coach O

==== Television ====
- Inside LSU Football with Ed Orgeron
- Inside LSU Basketball with Will Wade
- Inside Lady Tigers Basketball with Nikki Fargas
- Inside LSU Baseball with Paul Mainieri
- Inside LSU Gymnastics with D-D Breaux
- Inside LSU Softball with Beth Torina

== Radio stations ==
The stations listed below broadcast both men's and women's sports.

City	Station	Notes
Baton Rouge	WDGL-FM 98.1	Flagship #1
Baton Rouge	WNXX-FM/KNXX-FM 104.5/104.9	
Baton Rouge	WBRP-FM 107.3	Flagship #2
Baton Rouge/New Orleans	KGLA 830/97.5	Spanish language
Alexandria	KZMZ-FM 96.9	
Alexandria	KSYL-AM 970	
Alexandria	KDBS-FM 1410	
Bogalusa	WBOX-FM 92.9	
Conway/Little Rock, Arkansas	KCON FM 92.7	
Crossett, Arkansas	KWLT-FM 102.7	
Jackson, Mississippi	WYAB-FM 103.9	
Jena	KJNA-FM 102.7	
Lafayette/Opelousas	KLWB-FM 103.7	
Lafayette/Opelousas	KVOL-AM 1330	
Lake Charles	KKGB-FM 101.3	
Leesville	KJAE-AM 93.5	
Natchez, Mississippi	WQNZ-FM 95.1	
New Orleans	WWL-AM/WWL-FM 870/105.3	WWL-AM - Clear-channel radio station
New Orleans	WWWL-AM 1350	
Ruston	KNBB-FM 97.7	
Ruston	KRUS-AM 1490	
Ruston	KPCH-FM 99.3	
Shreveport	KWKH-AM 1130	Clear-channel radio station
Tylertown, Mississippi	WFCG-FM 107.3	
Vicksburg, Mississippi	WBBV-FM 101.3	
Ville Platte	KVPI-AM/KVPI-FM 1050/92.5	

== Satellite Radio ==
In a partnership with LSU Sports Properties, SiriusXM simulcasts all LSU football games and various other sports on their regional play-by-play channels: 190, 191 and 192.

== Over the air television stations ==
Market	Station	Affiliation	Channel
Baton Rouge	WBRZ-TV	ABC	2
Baton Rouge	KBTR-CD	Independent	41
Baton Rouge	Cox Cable	n/a	Cable 4
Alexandria	KLAX-TV	ABC	31
Lafayette	KADN-TV	FOX	15
Lake Charles	"KLOC-TV"	n/a	Cable 60
Monroe	KARD-TV	FOX	14
New Orleans	WWL-TV	CBS	4
New Orleans	WUPL-TV	MyNetworkTV	54
Shreveport	KSHV-TV	MyNetworkTV	48

== Pay-per-view television ==
=== TigerVision ===
TigerVision was the LSU Athletics Department in-house pay-per-view television broadcast channel providing live coverage of select non-network-televised LSU Tigers football games and also LSU Tigers basketball games and LSU Tigers baseball games from 1982 through 2013. Broadcasts were offered only to cable outlets inside the state of Louisiana and also on ESPN's GamePlan package outside of Louisiana. TigerVision produced all the coach's TV shows for football, men's basketball, women's basketball and baseball during its existence. With the creation of the SEC Network, Southeastern Conference member schools had to give up their rights for pay-per-view telecasts.

==== TigerVision football announcers ====
Play-by-play

- Paul Hornung - Play-by-play (1982)
- Jim Taylor - Play-by-play (1982)
- Steve Schneider - Play-by-play (1983)
- John Ferguson - Play-by-play (1984–87)
- Doug Greengard - Play-by-play (2001–13)

Analysts

- Doug Moreau - Analyst (1982–87)
- Greg Bowser - Analyst (2000s)
- Renee Nadeau - Analyst (2000s)

==== TigerVision basketball announcers ====
Play-by-play

- Tim Brando - Play-by-play (1982–86)

Analysts

- Jordy Hultberg - Analyst

== Regional cable networks ==
Network	Area served
Bally Sports Southwest (BSN-SW)	Louisiana, Arkansas, eastern New Mexico, Oklahoma and Texas
Cox Sports Television	Louisiana
