= K242CE =

Meraux, Louisiana; United States
- Broadcast area: New Orleans metropolitan area
- Frequency: 96.3 MHz
- Branding: Throwback 96.3

Programming
- Format: Classic hip hop

Ownership
- Owner: iHeartMedia, Inc.; (iHM Licenses, LLC)
- Sister stations: WFFX, WNOE-FM, WODT, WQUE-FM, WRNO-FM, WYLD WYLD-FM

History
- First air date: August 1, 2012

Technical information
- Licensing authority: FCC
- Facility ID: 146875
- Class: D
- ERP: 250 watts
- HAAT: 223 meters (732 feet)
- Transmitter coordinates: 29.95027°N 90.07087°W
- Repeater: 99.5-2 WRNO-FM HD2

Links
- Public license information: Public file; LMS
- Webcast: Listen Live
- Website: https://throwback963.iheart.com/

K242CE (96.3 FM), branded as "Throwback 96.3", is a classic hip hop radio station translator, simulcasting 99.5 WRNO-FM HD-2 licensed to Meraux, Louisiana.

== History ==
In February 2007, WYLD-FM 98.5 FM began broadcasting a smooth jazz format on its HD-2 frequency.

On August 1, 2012, the HD-2 frequency and translator of 98.5 FM WYLD-FM dropped its smooth jazz format for Top 40 (CHR) as "96.3 KISS FM." This marks the second time in this market that Clear Channel has used the Top 40 "KISS-FM" brand, which was last used at KSTE.

96.3 and 98.5 HD-2 KISS-FM aired radio personalities from other KISS-FM stations in the United States, and is jockless. The station does have local insertion of station identification, local commercials, and traffic reports.

"Rock 96.3" logo from 2014 to 2017)

On February 17, 2014, at noon, K242CE changed their format to active rock, branded as "Rock 96.3", relaying WRNO-FM HD2. The first song on Rock 96.3 was For Those About to Rock (We Salute You) by AC/DC. The change came a month after the previous active rock outlet in New Orleans, WRKN, flipped to country as "Nash FM 92.3".

On January 20, 2017, K242CE/WRNO-FM HD2 flipped to classic hip hop, branded as "Throwback 96.3."

== Former programming ==
- Elvis Duran and the Morning Show
- On Air with Ryan Seacrest
- Various personalities from other KISS-FM Clear Channel stations
