= Heltberg =

Heltberg is a surname. Notable people with the surname include:

- Bettina Heltberg (1942–2025), Danish writer and actor, daughter of Grethe
- Grethe Heltberg (1911–1996), Danish writer and poet
- Hilde Heltberg (1959–2011), Norwegian singer, guitarist, and songwriter

== See also ==
- Hultberg
