= KVPI =

KVPI may refer to:

- KVPI (AM), a radio station (1050 AM) licensed to Ville Platte, Louisiana, United States
- KVPI-FM, a radio station (92.5 FM) licensed to Ville Platte, Louisiana, United States
