= WTIX =

WTIX may refer to:

- WTIX-FM, a radio station (94.3 FM) licensed to serve Galliano, Louisiana, United States
- WEGO (AM), a defunct radio station (1410 AM) formerly licensed to serve Concord, North Carolina, which held the call sign WTIX from 2009 to 2018
- WTOB (AM), a radio station (980 AM) licensed to serve Winston-Salem, North Carolina, which used the call letters WTIX from 2006 to 2009
- WQNO, a radio station (690 AM) licensed to serve New Orleans, Louisiana, which used the call sign WTIX from 1953 to 2005
