= WYPY =

WYPY may refer to:

- a former call sign for WTGE, an American radio station licensed to Baton Rouge, Louisiana, United States
- a former call sign for WBRP, an American radio station licensed to Baker, Louisiana, United States
