= Jim Hawthorne (sportscaster) =

Retired LSU Tigers play-by-play announcer

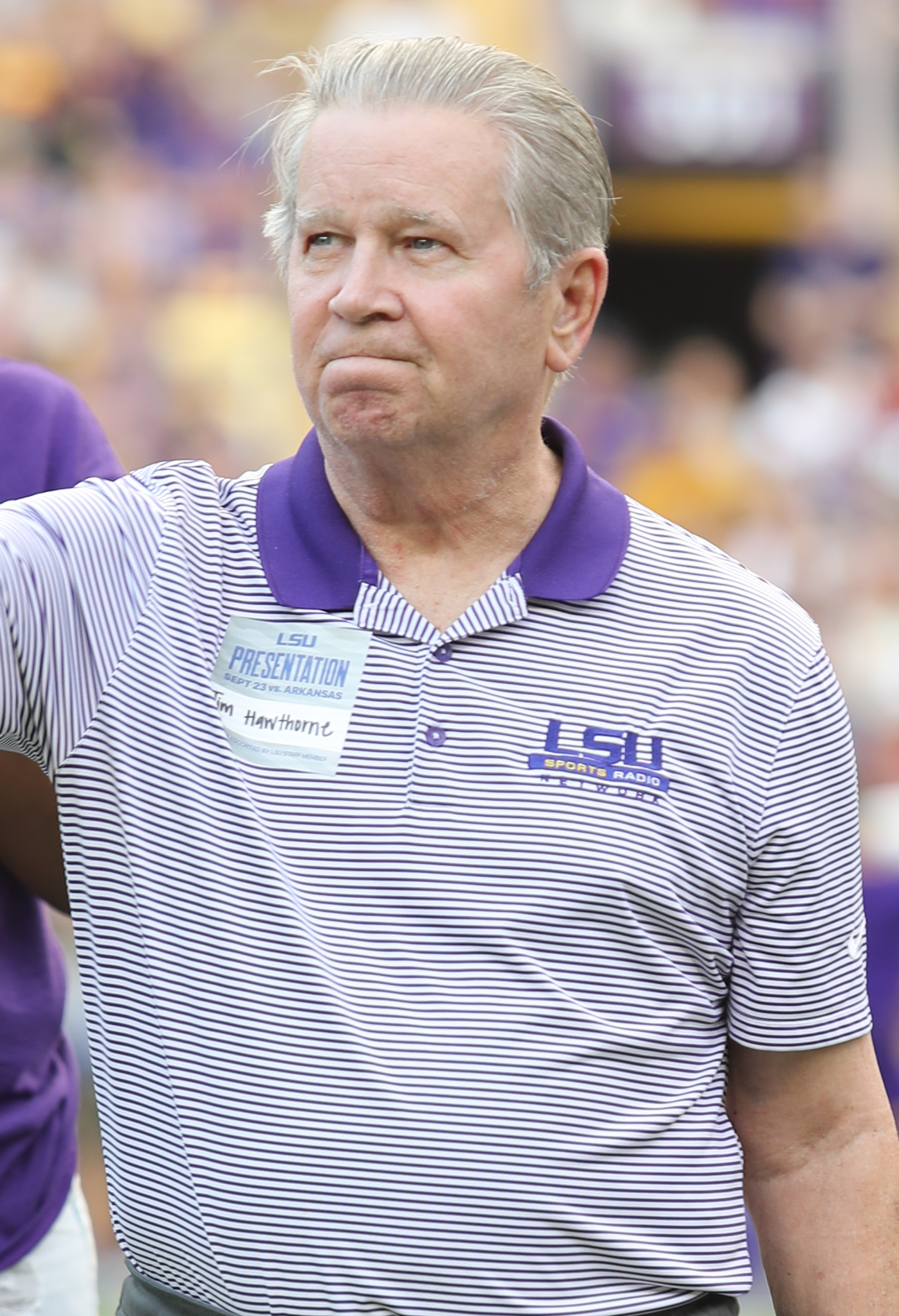
- Hawthorne in 2023
- Born: Anacoco, Louisiana, U.S.
- Education: Northwestern State University
- Occupation: Sports announcer

Jim Hawthorne is an American former radio sportscaster. He is best known for having called radio play-by-play for the LSU Tigers sports teams of Louisiana State University for over 36 years, from 1979 to 2016, earning the nickname, "Voice of the Tigers". Before LSU, he called radio play-by-play for his alma-mater Northwestern State and Centenary College, as well as Texas League baseball and in the short-lived World Football League (WFL).

Hawthorne began calling LSU basketball games during the 1979–80 season. He began calling LSU football games in 1983 and LSU baseball in 1984 taking over for John Ferguson. Overall, he was LSU's radio play-by-play announcer for two BCS National Championship titles in football, its first six of its College World Series championships in baseball, and three Final Four appearances in basketball.

His final season at LSU was the 2015 football season and 2015–16 men's basketball season. His final baseball season was the 2015 baseball season with Chris Blair taking over for the 2016 baseball season.

After retiring from LSU sports, from 2016 until 2019, he hosted a Sunday night classic country show on WTGE.

== Notable calls ==
- The "Earthquake Game" on October 8, 1988, in which the Tiger Stadium crowd's reaction to LSU's game-winning touchdown pass against Auburn is reported to have registered on a seismograph on campus.
- Warren Morris' walk-off home run for LSU in the 9th inning of 1996 College World Series, which Hawthorne singles out as his favorite call.
- The "Bluegrass Miracle" on November 9, 2002, a football game won by LSU against Kentucky with a last-second touchdown pass. The call is notable in part due to Hawthorne erroneously identifying the touchdown receiver as Jack Hunt, when it was actually Devery Henderson. Hunt was a defensive back and was not on the field. Hawthorne acknowledged it was Henderson later in the broadcast. The mistake was later deleted from archived versions of the broadcast.
- The 2011 "Game of the Century", a highly anticipated football game between No. 1 LSU and No. 2 Alabama on November 5, 2011, which LSU won in overtime, 9–6.

== Awards and recognition ==
In 2015, Hawthorne was honored by the National Football Foundation with the Chris Schenkel Award as an individual with a "long, distinguished career in broadcasting with direct ties to a specific university." In 2016, he was inducted into the Louisiana Sports Hall of Fame, and also received the Distinguished Service Award in Sports Journalism from the Louisiana Sports Writers Association.

== See also ==
- LSU Sports Network
