= Chris Blair (sportscaster) =

American radio sportscaster

- Born: Hindman, Kentucky, U.S.
- Education: Lander University
- Occupation: Sports announcer
- Spouse: Dr. Amber Anders Blair
- Children: Crafton Christopher, Rivers Elisabeth

Chris Blair is an American radio sportscaster. He is the radio play-by-play broadcaster for the LSU Tigers football, men's basketball and baseball teams at Louisiana State University. He has been the "Voice of the Tigers" since taking over for Jim Hawthorne for the 2016 baseball season. His first football season at LSU was the 2016 season and his first men's basketball season was the 2016–17 season.

== Biography ==
Chris Blair was born in Hindman, Kentucky. He attended Lander University in Greenwood, South Carolina graduating in 1997. He began his career calling Hillcrest High School sports games, in Simpsonville, South Carolina while as a student at Lander. From 1998 to 2004 he did play-by-play for Greenwood High School football. He also called Lander Bearcats baseball games and from 2001 to 2004 he called Lander Bearcats men's basketball games along with being involved with coverage of Clemson Tigers football on the Clemson Tiger Sports Network.

In 2006, Blair was hired by the Georgia Southern Eagles to be the play-by-play commentator for baseball, men's basketball and football replacing Nate Hirsch.

== See also ==
- LSU Sports Network
