= KKST =

Radio station in Alexandria, Louisiana

- Oakdale, Louisiana; United States
- Broadcast area: Alexandria-Pineville
- Frequency: 98.7 MHz (HD Radio)
- Branding: Kiss 98.7

Programming
- Language: English
- Format: Urban contemporary
- Subchannels: HD2: Urban adult contemporary; HD3: Urban gospel
- Affiliations: American Urban Radio Networks; Compass Media Networks

Ownership
- Owner: Cenla Broadcasting; (Cenla Broadcasting Licensing Company, LLC)
- Sister stations: KDBS; KQID-FM; KRRV-FM; KSYL; KZMZ

History
- First air date: 1972
- Former call signs: KCWR (1972–1982); KGBM-FM (1982–1984); KICR-FM (1984–1997)
- Call sign meaning: Station branded as "Star 98.7" from 1987 to 2006

Technical information
- Licensing authority: FCC
- Facility ID: 3423
- Class: C1
- ERP: 48,000 watts
- HAAT: 321 meters (1,053 ft)
- Transmitter coordinates: 31°1′59″N 92°30′8″W

Links
- Public license information: Public file; LMS
- Webcast: Listen live; HD2: Listen live; HD3: Listen live
- Website: www.kiss987fm.com

KKST (98.7 FM, "Kiss 98.7") is an American radio station broadcasting an urban contemporary format. Licensed to Oakdale, Louisiana, United States, the station serves the Alexandria metropolitan area. The station is owned by Cenla Broadcasting Licensing Company, LLC. and the signal covers Alexandria, Natchitoches and surrounding communities. Its studios are located on Texas Avenue in Alexandria, and its transmitter is located near Forest Hill, Louisiana.

== History ==
On June 30, 1971, Cyril W. and C. Winsett Reddoch, owners of radio station KREH (900 AM), received a construction permit to build a new 1,500-watt radio station at 104.9 MHz in Oakdale, Louisiana. The station signed on with an adult contemporary format the next year. The Reddochs continued to own KCWR and KREH until both were sold to George Mowad, a physician and the mayor of Oakdale, for $400,000 in 1981. On October 16, 1982, Mowad carried out a format overhaul; at that time, KCWR flipped to country as KGBM-FM. Two years later, both stations were sold to Strother Broadcasting Company of Louisiana for $350,000. KREH and KGBM-FM became KICR-AM-FM after the sale.

In 1988, the Federal Communications Commission approved a frequency change to 98.7 MHz and class increase for KICR-FM. The upgrade would allow the FM station to enter the Alexandria radio market. At the same time, both stations were sold to Bob Holladay and his B & D Communications for nearly $500,000. When the FM frequency change took place on May 14, 1990, the country format that had been on FM moved to the AM frequency, while KICR-FM relaunched as adult contemporary "Magic 98". The move-in of KICR-FM to the Alexandria market also meant that all station operations relocated there, with studios established on Bayou Rapides Road. The Magic format moved to the 93.9 frequency (then KFAD, now KMXH) in 1993, with KICR-FM switching to country music as "Hot Country 98".

Champion Broadcasting Corporation acquired KICR-FM in 1995 for $1.8 million, marking the start of a cluster in the market. One of the stations Champion acquired a lease on in 1996 was KRRV-FM 100.3, also in the country music format. Its ratings were so high that Champion opted to drop the country format on its KICR-FM and flip it to adult contemporary as KKST "Star 98.7" on January 1, 1997.

Rapid consolidation in the radio industry saw KKST and the other Champion Alexandria stations change hands multiple times in two years in the late 1990s. The entire company, with clusters in Alexandria, Midland, Texas, and Amarillo, Texas, was acquired by Capstar Broadcasting Partners for $11.3 million in 1998. Capstar and Chancellor Media announced that August that they would merge (Hicks, Muse, Tate & Furst was a major shareholder in both companies); upon the merger's completion in July 1999, the combined company was named AMFM Inc. AMFM was in turn acquired by Clear Channel Communications in a deal announced on October 4, 1999, and completed in August 2000.

The station's effective radiated power was increased again in 2006 to 48,000 watts at 321 meters (1,053 ft), on a shared tower with sister stations KRRV-FM and KZMZ. That year, Clear Channel sold its entire Alexandria cluster to Cenla Broadcasting for more than $4 million, with Cenla immediately taking programming control via a local marketing agreement. Cenla had been programming KEDG (106.9 FM), owned by Flinn Broadcasting, as hip-hop "Kiss 106.9" and moved the Kiss format to KKST as a result of the sale. (The Star moniker and format were later revived by KEDG.)
