= WYLD-FM =

Urban adult contemporary radio station in New Orleans

Coordinates: 29.920°N 90.025°W

- New Orleans, Louisiana; United States
- Broadcast area: New Orleans metropolitan area
- Frequency: 98.5 MHz (HD Radio)
- Branding: 98.5 WYLD

Programming
- Format: Urban adult contemporary
- Affiliations: Premiere Networks

Ownership
- Owner: iHeartMedia, Inc.; (iHM Licenses, LLC)
- Sister stations: WFFX; WNOE-FM; WODT; WQUE-FM; WRNO-FM; WYLD

History
- First air date: March 11, 1965
- Former call signs: WWOM-FM (1965–1972); WIXO (1972–1974)
- Call sign meaning: Sounds like "wild"

Technical information
- Facility ID: 11972
- Class: C0
- ERP: 100,000 watts
- HAAT: 300 meters (980 ft)

Links
- Webcast: Listen live (via iHeartRadio)
- Website: wyldfm.iheart.com

WYLD-FM (98.5 MHz) is a commercial radio station in New Orleans, Louisiana, and one of the highest-rated radio stations in the market. It airs an urban adult contemporary radio format and is owned by iHeartMedia, Inc. The studios and offices are located in Downtown New Orleans. It carries the syndicated Steve Harvey Morning Show weekdays from co-owned Premiere Networks.

WYLD-FM has an effective radiated power (ERP) of 100,000 watts. The transmitter is on Behrman Highway in the Algiers neighborhood of New Orleans.

== History ==
On March 11, 1965, 98.5 MHz signed on as WWOM-FM, the sister station to WWOM (600 AM). It was owned by the Wagenwood Broadcasting Company, with studios at 344 Camp Street.

The station was sold to Advance Communications in 1972, and became Top 40-formatted WIXO ("98.5 - a little cooler than normal"). However, in the early 1970s, only some people owned FM radios and ratings were low. On September 24, 1974, at 4: p.m., WIXO went dark. "Golden Slumbers", "Carry That Weight", and "The End", tracks from The Beatles’ Abbey Road album, were the final tunes to be played on the station. After Program Director and morning disc jockey Michael Greene (formerly of WTIX) read the sign-off announcement, the station called it a day with "Her Majesty", the very last track from Abbey Road.

The station remained silent for five months, with the owners stating they could no longer bear its operating costs. It was sold to Peterson Broadcasting Corporation in February 1975. Under Peterson, the newly renamed WYLD-FM began a successful run as a rhythmic contemporary ("CHUrban") outlet after the format was shifted over from WYLD (940 AM), which Peterson separately bought at the same time. For years, it was branded as WYLD FM 98 and later as WYLD FM 98 Jammin'!. By the late 1980s, it competed with WQUE-FM, which lasted until 1993, when it became WQUE's sister station. With WQUE concentrating on youthful listeners, WYLD-FM evolved into its current urban adult contemporary format.

WYLD-AM-FM were acquired by San Antonio-based Clear Channel Communications in 1993. Clear Channel was the forerunner to today's owner, iHeartMedia, Inc.

Until December 2013, WYLD-FM carried the syndicated Tom Joyner Morning Show. Crosstown competitor KMEZ picked up Joyner, and WYLD-FM switched to carrying Steve Harvey in the morning, which formerly aired on WQUE.

On August 1, 2012, WYLD-FM's HD2 subchannel and its FM translator K242CE (96.3 FM) dropped their smooth jazz format for Top 40/CHR as "96.3 KISS FM". This marks the second time in the market that Clear Channel has used the Top 40 "KISS-FM" brand, which was previously used at KSTE-FM. The "Kiss FM" format lasted until February 17, 2014, when K242CE switched to active rock, simulcasting WRNO-HD2. The translator now carries the "Throwback" format, airing classic hip hop.
