= KVDU =

Radio station in Gonzales, Louisiana

- Gonzales, Louisiana; United States
- Broadcast area: Baton Rouge metropolitan area
- Frequency: 104.1 MHz
- Branding: 104.1 The Vibe

Programming
- Format: Urban adult contemporary
- Affiliations: Premiere Networks

Ownership
- Owner: iHeartMedia, Inc.; (iHM Licenses, LLC)
- Sister stations: KRVE, WFMF, WJBO, WYNK-FM

History
- First air date: November 15, 1968
- Former call signs: KHOM-FM (1968–1998); KUMX (1998–2001); KFXN-FM (2001–2002); KSTE-FM (2002–2005); KHEV (2005–2006); KYRK (2006–2010); KOBW (2010–2011)
- Call sign meaning: Sounds like "voodoo" (former branding)

Technical information
- Licensing authority: FCC
- Facility ID: 34528
- Class: C3
- ERP: 17,500 watts
- HAAT: 119 meters (390 ft)
- Transmitter coordinates: 30°22′26″N 91°05′44″W

Links
- Public license information: Public file; LMS
- Webcast: Listen live (via iHeartRadio)
- Website: 1041thevibe.iheart.com

KVDU (104.1 FM, "104.1 The Vibe") is a commercial radio station licensed to Gonzales, Louisiana, United States, and serving the Baton Rouge metropolitan area. It airs an urban adult contemporary format and is owned by iHeartMedia, Inc. The studios are located east of downtown Baton Rouge.

KVDU's transmitter is on Mancuso Lane in Baton Rouge.

== History ==
=== MOR and Oldies ===
The station signed on the air on November 15, 1968. The station's original call sign was KHOM, with the call letters reflecting its original city of license, Houma. It broadcast from a 350-foot tower, only targeting the Houma area.

In 1989, it moved its antenna atop the 2,000-foot tower in Vacherie, also used by WCKW-FM (now WZRH). The move allowed the station's signal to reach into the New Orleans and Baton Rouge markets. The more–powerful signal could also be heard in Lafayette, Louisiana, and even some counties in Mississippi. The station remained licensed to Houma, but dropped its middle of the road (MOR) format for oldies.

=== Top 40 ===
In late 1994, after WEZB ended its Top 40 format in favor of Hot talk, KHOM's then-owner, Raymond A. Saadi, decided to flip KHOM to Top 40 as "Mix 104.1." The station kept the heritage KHOM call letters before changing to KUMX in 1998. In February 1997, the station was acquired by San Antonio-based Clear Channel Communications, a forerunner to today's iHeartMedia, for $8.75 million. Clear Channel also acquired other FM stations in the New Orleans market, including urban contemporary WQUE-FM, urban adult contemporary WYLD-FM, country music WNOE-FM, and alternative rock KKND (now owned by Cumulus). Under Clear Channel ownership, KUMX ran a small playlist, stressing repeated airing of the biggest current hits.

The move to Top 40 paid off in the ratings, and in the spring of 1996, WEZB switched back to its original Top 40 format and recaptured most of its old audience. On June 29, 2001, at 6 a.m., "Mix" signed off with "When It's Over" by Sugar Ray, and began stunting by playing only construction sound effects.

=== Classic Rock, Adult Top 40 and Urban Gospel ===
At 5 p.m. on June 29, the station flipped to a classic rock format as "104-1 The Fox," under the new KFXN-FM call sign. The new format launched with an "All Beatles Weekend", beginning with "Sgt. Pepper's Lonely Hearts Club Band."

On July 26, 2002, the station returned to Top 40 music as the adult-leaning "104.1 KISS-FM," under new call sign KSTE-FM. However, "KISS-FM" did not catch on in the ratings. By November 2003, the format shifted to Rhythmic Top 40, then flipped to urban gospel in July 2005 as "Hallelujah 104.1", under new call letters KHEV.

After 16 months in the gospel format, Clear Channel decided to replace it with active rock on November 13, 2006. In the process, it inherited "The Rock of New Orleans" slogan from sister station WRNO-FM, which dropped its heritage rock/classic rock format for all-talk on the same day as KHEV's flip. On November 20, 2006, Clear Channel replaced the KHEV call sign with new call letters KYRK.

=== The Brew, Voodoo and The Spot ===
On July 1, 2010, at 3 p.m., KYRK changed its format back to classic rock, this time branded as 104.1 The Brew. The station's former active rock format was moved to its HD2 signal at that time. On July 19, 2010, KYRK changed call letters to KOBW to go with the "Brew" branding. "The Brew" was positioned as "Classic Rock for a New Generation", which played mostly late 60s, 70s, 80s, and early 90s classic rock tracks.

"Voodoo 104" logo (2011–2017)

Nearly a year later, on June 30, 2011, the station flipped to iHeartMedia's "GenX Radio" format as Voodoo 104, carrying a classic hits format focusing primarily on music from the 1990s. The station changed its call letters to KVDU to match the new branding. By the beginning of 2012, KVDU had dropped the "GenX" format and segued to a rhythmic adult contemporary format, and later segued to hot adult contemporary.

Logo as "The Spot" prior to Baton Rouge relocation, 2017-2024

On August 22, 2017, at 5 p.m., KVDU flipped to a rock-leaning adult hits format, branded as 104.1 The Spot. The station would switch to Christmas music for much of November and December, returning to its regular format after the holidays.

=== Tower collapse, relocation to Baton Rouge ===
During Hurricane Ida in August 2021, KVDU's tower, shared with Cumulus Media-owned 92.3 WZRH, was destroyed. High winds knocked out the station's terrestrial broadcast, although the station continued streaming on the iHeartRadio app. Eventually, the station was able to find a temporary tower in downtown New Orleans.

A permanent new tower location was not found until March of the following year, when iHeart announced to the FCC its intention to change the city of license to Gonzales. This also moved the station's signal closer to Baton Rouge. The shorter tower and relocation ended KVDU's ability to effectively cover the New Orleans radio market. As KVDU left the New Orleans market, co-owned 103.7 WFFX concurrently moved from Hattiesburg, Mississippi, closer to New Orleans.

The moves took effect on October 14, 2024, with KVDU adopting an urban adult contemporary format as 104.1 The Vibe. The station now serves as the Baton Rouge home for several nationally syndicated programs broadcast by Premiere Networks, most notably The Steve Harvey Morning Show and The Sweat Hotel with Keith Sweat. Meanwhile, WFFX revived the "Voodoo" branding and hot AC format previously used by KVDU.
