= John Ferguson (sportscaster) =

American sportscaster (1920–2005)

- Born: December 16, 1920; Louisiana, US
- Died: December 17, 2005 (aged 85); Zachary, Louisiana, US
- Resting place: Port Hudson National Cemetery
- Education: Louisiana Tech University
- Occupation: Sports announcer

John Ferguson (December 16, 1920 - December 17, 2005) was an American sportscaster for the LSU Tigers basketball and football teams on radio and later television. He also called New Orleans Saints games, Cotton States League baseball games and the Southwest Conference football game of the week.

== Biography ==
John Ferguson was born in 1919 in Louisiana. He began his career calling Cotton States League games in El Dorado, Arkansas in 1942. When World War II started, Ferguson enlisted in the army as an Army Air pilot completing 144 missions piloting cargo planes over the Himalayas between India and China, supplying B-29s for their bombing runs.

After World War II, Ferguson moved to Baton Rouge, Louisiana and when WJBO-AM won the rights to LSU games they asked if he was available and he took the job. After the 1958 season, Ferguson took a break from calling LSU games to do the Southwest Conference football game of the week. Because of this, Ferguson was not the announcer for Billy Cannon's Halloween run versus Ole Miss in 1959. J.C. Politz was the LSU broadcaster from 1959 to 1960. In 1961, Ferguson returned to LSU and broadcast men's basketball and football games. For a time, Ferguson was also the play-by-play commentator for the New Orleans Saints. The 1983 season was his last year as radio broadcaster at LSU. In 1984, Ferguson transitioned over to TigerVision, LSU's pay-per-view television network for football games and Jim Hawthorne took over as radio broadcaster for LSU baseball, men's basketball and football. Also in 1984, Ferguson was awarded the Distinguished Service Award in Sports Journalism from the Louisiana Sports Writers Association. He retired in 1987.

Ferguson also served as the executive director of the Tiger Athletic Foundation. He died in 2005 at the age of 86 in Zachary, Louisiana and was interred at Port Hudson National Cemetery.

== See also ==
- LSU Sports Network
