= The Steve Harvey Morning Show =

American syndicated radio show

- Genre: Comedy, Talk, Urban Adult Contemporary, R&B, Gospel, Classic Soul
- Running time: 4 hours (approximately)
- Country of origin: United States
- Home station: KJLH (Los Angeles)
- Syndicates: Premiere Radio Networks
- Hosted by: Steve Harvey; Shirley Strawberry; Carla Ferrell; Nephew Tommy; Kier "Junior" Spates; J. Anthony Brown (former)
- Created by: Steve Harvey; Rushion McDonald
- Produced by: Monica Barnes
- Original release: September 2000 – Present
- Opening theme: Steve Harvey in the Morning performed by Dave Hollister
- Website: steveharveyfm.com

The Steve Harvey Morning Show is a national radio program which is currently broadcast from Los Angeles. The nationally syndicated show features host Steve Harvey and a team of comedians and commentators.

The show runs approximately four hours each weekday, with a "best of" show airing on some affiliates on Saturdays. Harvey focuses on comedy and current events. The music includes past and current urban adult contemporary from Usher to Bruno Mars and some gospel hits from Kirk Franklin to Lecrae. Most affiliated stations are programmed for African-American listeners. An abbreviated version of the show (usually cut down to under 90 minutes, without the music) is also uploaded daily on the show's YouTube channel as well as a podcast.

== Broadcast history ==
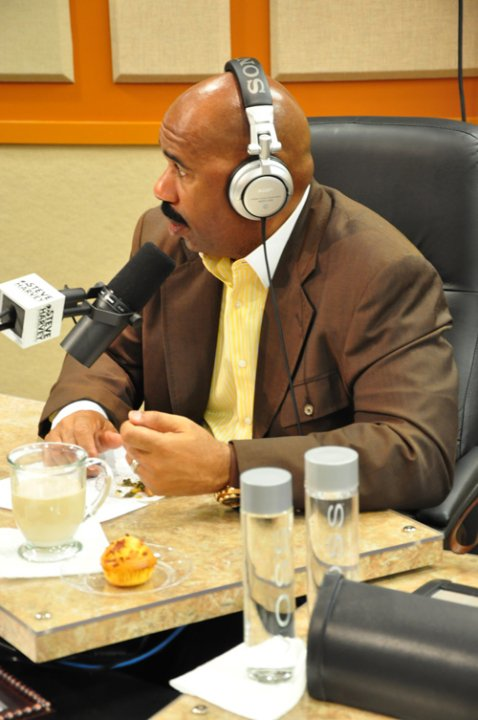
Steve Harvey hosting his syndicated radio show in April 2010.

The show was originally syndicated under Radio One, Inc., a minority-owned broadcasting company, now called Urban One. It ran from September 2000 until May 2005. Despite efforts to syndicate the show nationally, ultimately, it aired only in L.A., on 100.3 KKBT, and in Dallas on 97.9 KBFB, both stations owned by Radio One. Harvey split his time between the Dallas and L.A. studios. As a result, Harvey and Radio One decided to part ways shortly before his contract expired.

In September 2005, Harvey signed a joint syndication deal with Premiere Radio Networks and Inner City Broadcasting Corporation for a new incarnation of The Steve Harvey Morning Show. In March 2009, it was announced that The Steve Harvey Morning Show would replace The Tom Joyner Morning Show in Chicago on WVAZ.

In February 2017, it was announced that the program would move to Los Angeles KJLH to accommodate Harvey's new LA-based TV talk show, which replaced one that was produced in Chicago.

Harvey signed a multiyear extension with Premiere in October 2021.

=== Show cities and affiliates ===
City	Station	Frequency	Notes
New York City, New York	107.5 WBLS	FM 107.5	
Los Angeles, California	102.3 Radio Free KJLH	FM 102.3	Flagship station
Chicago, Illinois	V103	FM 102.7	
Dallas, Texas	Smooth R&B 105.7	FM 105.7	
Atlanta, Georgia	Majic 107.5/97.5	FM 107.5 & 97.5	
Washington, D.C.	96.3 WHUR	FM 96.3	
Philadelphia, Pennsylvania	105.3 WDAS	FM 105.3	
Seattle, Washington	Z-Twins Radio	AM 1620	
Detroit, Michigan	Mix 92.3	FM 92.3	
Charlotte, North Carolina	V101.9	FM 101.9	
Nashville, Tennessee	101.1 The Beat	FM 101.1	
Milwaukee, Wisconsin	Jammin' 98.3	FM 98.3	
Norfolk, Virginia	95.7 R&B	FM 95.7	
Jacksonville, Florida	V101.5	FM 101.5	
Greensboro, North Carolina	97.1 QMG	FM 97.1	
West Palm Beach, Florida	X102.3	FM 102.3	
New Orleans, Louisiana	98.5 WYLD	FM 98.5	
Memphis, Tennessee	103.5 WRBO	FM 103.5	
Richmond, Virginia	106.5 The Beat	FM 106.5	
Hartford, Connecticut	102.5 Hartford's R&B Station	FM 102.5	
Louisville, Kentucky	Magic 101.3	FM 101.3	
Greenville, South Carolina	96.3/104.5/107.7 The Block	FM 96.3, 104.5, & 107.7	
Buffalo, New York	Power 93.7 WBLK	FM 93.7	
Rochester, New York	103.9 WDKX	FM 103.9	
Birmingham, Alabama	Hot 107.7	FM 107.7	
Dayton, Ohio	92.1 WROU	FM 92.1	
Knoxville, Tennessee	Jammin' 99.7	AM 1040	
Columbia, South Carolina	The Big DM	FM 101.3	
Syracuse, New York	Power 620	AM 620	
Lexington, Kentucky	107.9 The Beat	FM 107.9	
Augusta, Georgia	96.3 Kiss-FM	FM 96.3	
Lafayette, Louisiana	Magic 104.7 KNEK	FM 104.7	
Jackson, Mississippi	Kixie 107	FM 107.5	
Killeen, Texas	My Kiss 103.1	FM 103.1	
Tyler, Texas	107.3 Kiss FM	FM 107.3	
Shreveport, Louisiana	102.1 KDKS	FM 102.1	
McComb, Mississippi	107.7 WAZA	FM 107.7	
Beaumont, Texas	Magic 102.5	FM 102.5	
Lake Charles, Louisiana	107 Jamz	FM 107.5	
Berwick, Louisiana	105.9 The Breeze	FM 105.9	
Montgomery, Alabama	Magic 97.1	FM 97.1	
Monroe, Louisiana	100.1 The Beat	FM 100.1	
Saginaw, Michigan	Kiss 107.1	FM 107.1	
Alexandria, Louisiana	Mix 93.9	FM 93.9	
Baton Rouge, Louisiana	104.1 The Vibe	FM 104.1	
