= KBCE =

Radio station in Boyce, Louisiana

- Boyce, Louisiana; United States
- Broadcast area: Greater Alexandria
- Frequency: 102.3 MHz
- Branding: 102.3 Jack FM

Programming
- Language: English
- Format: Adult hits
- Network: Jack FM

Ownership
- Owner: JWBP Broadcasting
- Sister stations: KMXH

History
- First air date: June 17, 1981
- Former call signs: KXOU (1981); KFQM (1981–1982)
- Call sign meaning: "Boyce"

Technical information
- Licensing authority: FCC
- Facility ID: 67947
- Class: C3
- ERP: 21,000 watts
- HAAT: 88 meters (289 ft)
- Transmitter coordinates: 31°22′21.00″N 92°38′9.00″W

Links
- Public license information: Public file; LMS
- Webcast: Listen live
- Website: jackfmalexandria.com

KBCE (102.3 FM, ″102.3 Jack FM") is an American radio station broadcasting an adult hits format. Licensed to Boyce, Louisiana, United States, the station serves the Alexandria, Louisiana area. The station is currently owned by JWBP Broadcasting. Its studios are located at FCA Plaza in Alexandria, and its transmitter is located near Boyce.

== History ==
The station was assigned the call letters KXOU on June 17, 1981. On November 23 of the same year, the station changed its call sign to KFQM and then changed again on April 5, 1982, to the current KBCE along with a change to an Urban Contemporary format. In 2019, KBCE changed to an Adult Hits format as "102.3 Jack-FM".
