= Big D and Bubba =

American syndicated radio morning show

The Big D and Bubba Show
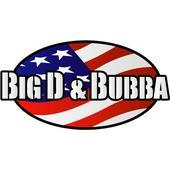
- Genre: Comedy, Country Music
- Running time: 4 hours (approximately)
- Country of origin: United States
- Home station: 95.5 WSM (broadcasts from Nashville, TN)
- Starring: Derek Haskins (Big D) Sean Powell (Bubba) "Carsen" "Shaffer" "Garrett"
- Produced by: Jonathan Shaffer Garrett Freche
- Original release: December 16, 1996
- Website: bigdandbubba.com

The Big D & Bubba Show is a nationally syndicated radio show airing six days a week on over 100+ country music FM radio stations.

Compass Media Networks syndicates the show. Live shows are broadcast from 6-10 AM (Eastern Time) Monday through Friday.

There is also a pre-show heard on weekday mornings from 5-6 AM (ET) and a four-hour "best of" show called "The Big D & Bubba Weekend Wakeup", which is heard on Saturday or Sunday mornings on most broadcast affiliates.

The Big D & Bubba Show is broadcast globally in over 177 countries through the American Forces Network (AFN). The show is available on all United States military installations and all ships at sea.

Listeners can also listen to a live stream of the show on the Big D & Bubba app, which is available on iPhone & Android devices.

"The Big D & Bubba Weekly Podcast" is a popular comedy, entertainment, and lifestyle-focused podcast centered around the lives of the members of the show, their families, and friends.

Big D & Bubba also host “Honky Tonkin’ with Big D & Bubba”, which is a three-hour weekend show focusing on country music from the ‘80s, ‘90s, and early to mid-2000s. Each show usually features a guest celebrity sharing their personal stories and the history of their songs.

Big D (Derek Haskins) is married with two sons and spent time as an exchange student in Russia. He is originally from Cookeville, Tennessee. Big D is also a licensed airplane pilot.

Bubba (Sean Powell) is divorced and a father of two daughters and a son. Bubba grew up in Houma, Louisiana, and like Big D, also started on the radio at age 14. He has worked for radio stations nationwide and in Guam. Bubba is also an airplane pilot, and a former firefighter.

== History ==
Big D & Bubba first teamed up on December 16, 1996, on WXCT (now WTGE) in Baton Rouge, Louisiana. The show succeeded enough to garner the attention of cross-town country rival WYNK-FM. In February 1999, Big D & Bubba signed a deal with AMFM Broadcasting (then owner of WYNK) to do mornings on the station and syndicate the show nationally. No country morning show had ever been successful in a nationally syndicated format for an extended period. Soon after their debut on WYNK, AMFM Broadcasting was purchased by Clear Channel Communications, a forerunner to iHeartMedia, Inc.

In March 1999, Patrick Thomas was hired as executive producer. He remained with Big D & Bubba until 2023.

On December 6, 1999, Big D & Bubba were first heard on KMML-FM in Amarillo, Texas, marking the beginning of the show's syndication.

The show grew slowly but steadily while fighting the widely held belief that a syndicated country morning show would not work. By the summer of 2003, the Big D & Bubba Show was heard on 14 radio stations - more than any other previous attempt at syndicating a country morning show.

In the fall of 2003, Clear Channel Communications relocated Big D & Bubba to Nashville, Tennessee, basing their show on radio station WSIX-FM.

In September 2005, Big D & Bubba signed a syndication deal with Premiere Radio Networks.

On November 22, 2011, Big D & Bubba ended their broadcast on WSIX to concentrate on their syndication. The move set plans for their eventual departure from corporate radio.

In September 2013, Big D & Bubba announced they were leaving Premiere Networks to form their own production company, Silverfish Media. They signed a partnership deal with Compass Media Networks to distribute the show, sell advertising, and license it to affiliates.

In January 2016, Jessica "Carsen" Humphreville became the show's first female cast member. She remains with the show and is currently the Director of Programming for Silverfish Media's properties. She also hosts "Country with Carsen", which airs 10 AM - 3 PM and is also syndicated via Compass Media Networks.

On Monday, October 18, 2021, Big D & Bubba returned to the Nashville airwaves on WKDF. (The show previously aired in Nashville on rival station WSIX from 2003 to 2011). Since June 2025, the show now airs on Cumulus Media sister station 95.5 WSM.

Garrett Freche joined Silverfish Media and the Big D & Bubba show in 2022 as Digital Content Director, overseeing all aspects of social media, video, and online presence.

On Monday June 5, 2023, Jonathan Shaffer ("Shaffer") joined the Big D & Bubba show as Executive Producer. He had previously spent 10 years (2009-2019) at 650 AM WSM (WSM-AM), the "Radio Home of the Grand Ole Opry".

== Awards and recognition ==
On July 21, 2025, Big D & Bubba will be inducted into the Country Radio Hall of Fame

Big D & Bubba are also two-time nominees for the National Radio Hall of Fame (2024 & 2025).

- 2007, 2014, 2022, 2024 Winner of the Academy of Country Music "National Daily On-Air Personality of the Year"
- 2015 Winner of the Country Music Association "Daily National Broadcast Personality"

They were also nominated for the Academy of Country Music's National Daily On-Air Personality of the Year in 2010, 2016, and 2020.

Big D & Bubba were nominated by the Country Music Association as the CMA Awards Daily National Broadcast Personality in 2002, 2007, 2011, 2014, 2017 and 2023.
