= WYNK-FM =

Country music radio station in Baton Rouge, Louisiana

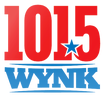
- Baton Rouge, Louisiana; United States
- Broadcast area: Baton Rouge metropolitan area (secondary coverage of Lafayette, Louisiana)
- Frequency: 101.5 MHz (HD Radio)
- Branding: 101.5 WYNK

Programming
- Format: Country
- Subchannels: HD2: Downtown Radio 97.7 Oldies
- Affiliations: Premiere Networks

Ownership
- Owner: iHeartMedia; (iHM Licenses, LLC)
- Sister stations: KRVE, WFMF, WJBO, KVDU

History
- First air date: September 1, 1968
- Call sign meaning: Pronounced "wink"

Technical information
- Facility ID: 47402
- Class: C
- ERP: 100,000 watts
- HAAT: 457 meters (1,499 ft)
- Transmitter coordinates: 30°19′34.00″N 91°16′36.00″W
- Translator: 97.7 K249DV Baton Rouge (relays HD2)

Links
- Webcast: Listen Live
- Website: wynkcountry.iheart.com

WYNK-FM (101.5 MHz) – branded 101.5 WYNK – is a commercial country radio station licensed to serve Baton Rouge, Louisiana. Owned by iHeartMedia, the station covers the Baton Rouge metropolitan area and is the local affiliate for The Bobby Bones Show. The WYNK studios are located in Baton Rouge, while the station transmitter resides in nearby Plaquemine. Besides a standard analog transmission, WYNK is available online via iHeartRadio.

== History ==
The FM adjunct to WYNK (1380 AM), WYNK-FM signed on the air on September 1, 1968, owned by the Miss Lou Broadcasting Corporation. The two stations simulcast country music, WYNK-FM has kept the same call letters and country format ever since.

Originally powered at 33,300 watts, WYNK-FM got a boost to 100,000 watts in the early 1970s, then relocated to a taller tower in the early 1980s, allowing the station to be heard from New Orleans to Lafayette. McGregor sold WYNK and WYNK-FM in the 1980s to Narragansett Broadcasting, a company that would eventually be acquired by Capstar.

In 2000, Capstar merged with San Antonio-based Clear Channel Communications; WYNK was sold to Davidson Media in 2007, switching to a Christian radio format. In 2014, Clear Channel changed its name to iHeartMedia, after its successful iHeartRadio streaming platform.

WYNK-FM originally served as the flagship station for nationally syndicated Big D and Bubba from 1999 until 2003, then they aired again until late 2013 when Bobby Bones took over; the program currently airs on competing station WTGE.

== HD2 station ==
WYNK airs an oldies format on its HD2 channel, Downtown Radio 97.7. The station was established in October 2011. During New Year’s becoming 2017, the station flipped to simulcast WJBO, then in 2020, WJBO moved over to 98.7 on FM making Downtown Radio 97.7 come back.
