= WFMF =

Contemporary hit radio station in Baton Rouge, Louisiana

- Baton Rouge, Louisiana; United States
- Broadcast area: Baton Rouge metropolitan area; (secondary coverage of Lafayette, Louisiana)
- Frequency: 102.5 MHz (HD Radio)
- Branding: 102.5 WFMF

Programming
- Language: English
- Format: Contemporary hit radio
- Subchannels: HD2: WJBO simulcast
- Affiliations: Premiere Networks

Ownership
- Owner: iHeartMedia; (iHM Licenses, LLC)
- Sister stations: KRVE, WJBO, WYNK-FM, KVDU

History
- First air date: June 15, 1941; 84 years ago
- Former call signs: W45BR (1940–1943); WBRL (1943–1959); WJBO-FM (1959–1974); WFMF (1974–1996); WLSS (1996–1999)
- Call sign meaning: portmanteau of FM and Manship Family (original owners)

Technical information
- Licensing authority: FCC
- Facility ID: 4053
- Class: C
- ERP: 100,000 watts
- HAAT: 457 meters (1,499 ft)
- Transmitter coordinates: 30.326°N 91.277°W

Links
- Public license information: Public file; LMS
- Webcast: Listen live (via iHeartRadio)
- Website: wfmf.iheart.com

WFMF (102.5 FM, 102.5 WFMF) is a commercial radio station owned by iHeartMedia and licensed to Baton Rouge, Louisiana. It serves the Baton Rouge metropolitan area with a contemporary hit radio format. The studios are located in Baton Rouge, and the transmitter site is in nearby Plaquemine.

Dating to the early 1940s, WFMF is one of the oldest FM stations in the United States. It is the Baton Rouge affiliate for: The Kidd Kraddick Morning Show; On Air with Ryan Seacrest; and American Top 40. Besides a standard analog transmission, WFMF is available online via iHeartRadio.

== History ==
On October 31, 1940, the Federal Communications Commission (FCC) awarded the first fifteen construction permits for commercial FM stations, including one to the Baton Rouge Broadcasting Company. Inc. on 44.5 MHz, which was issued the call sign W45BR. Baton Rouge Broadcasting was owned by the Manship family, which also owned AM station WJBO and a local newspaper, The Morning Advocate.

The new station grants originally allowed for commercial operation to begin on January 1, 1941. However, W45BR's link to the owner of a newspaper caused a delay, after the FCC began an investigation as to whether newspaper cross-ownership of radio stations should be restricted. On May 6, 1941, W45BR was one of three newspaper-affiliated stations given provisional permission, pending the outcome of the newspaper ownership review, to begin operations. After a short period of test transmissions, the station made its debut broadcast as "the first frequency modulation radio station in the deep south" on June 15, 1941. Programming was initially advertised as being "a different program from WJBO (with a few exceptions)", with a daily schedule of 7:00-9:00 a.m., 11:30 a.m.-1:30 p.m., and 6:00-9:00 p.m.

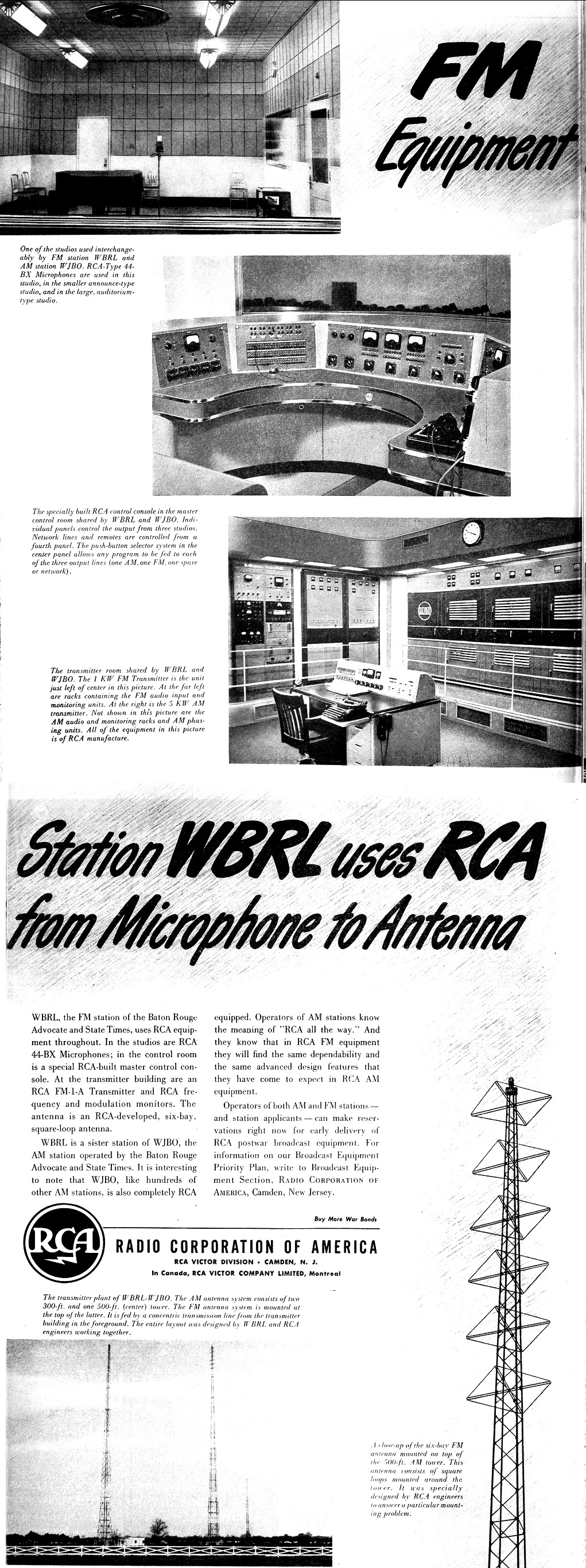
1945 RCA advertisement featuring WBRL's facilities.

Effective November 1, 1943, the FCC modified its policy for FM call letters, and the call sign was changed to WBRL. In 1946, as part of reassignment of all stations to a new FM band allocation, WBRL was moved to 96.1 MHz, and two years later it moved again to 98.1 MHz. In 1959, WBRL's call letters changed to WJBO-FM, still simulcasting WJBO. In the mid-1960s, the station started broadcasting in FM stereo, and started offering classical music and some musical programs independent of WJBO. In 1965, WJBO-FM moved to 102.5 MHz, allowing WAFB-FM (now WDGL-FM), a companion station to Channel 9 WAFB-TV, to move from 104.3 MHz to the vacated 98.1 MHz assignment.

In the late 60s and into the mid-70s, WJBO-FM was a freeform progressive rock station that went by the name "Loose Radio." In 1974, WJBO-FM switched its call sign to WFMF and shifted to a personality driven full-service Top 40 format under Program Director Randy Rice and became one of the most successful FM-Top 40/CHR stations in the United States (Arbitron Ratings market share). WFMF remained a top 40 station throughout the 1980s and early 1990s. It used the monikers "102 WFMF," "Hot 102," and "Mix 102.5" for a short time in 1994 before reverting to "102.5 WFMF." Throughout its history as a Top 40, the station had shifted its musical directions, to Rhythmic, Adult-leaning and Alternative, but in each case returned to a mainstream playlist.

In 1989, the Manship family sold WFMF and WJBO to station manager George Jenne, who moved the stations' studios to Government Street. In 1996, WJBO and WFMF were sold by George Jenne/Capital City Communications to Capstar Broadcasting (under the name Gulfstar). Capstar immediately shifted WFMF from Top 40 to Modern AC as "Loose 102" under the new call letters WLSS. The change turned out to be a ratings disaster and after lasting only half a year as a Modern AC, WLSS went back to Top 40 in February 1997, using the name "Loose 102-5" at first. Then it simply called itself "102.5" in early 1999. On October 7, 1999, WFMF returned as the call sign and the name "102.5 WFMF" was resurrected a short time later.

Since being bought by Capstar, WFMF has been through several owners as a result of buyouts. Capstar was purchased by Chancellor Media in 1998 (and renamed AMFM Communications), which in turn was purchased by Clear Channel Communications in 2000. In 2014, Clear Channel switched its name to iHeartMedia.
