= KRRV-FM =

Radio station in Alexandria, Louisiana

- Alexandria, Louisiana; United States
- Broadcast area: Alexandria-Pineville
- Frequency: 100.3 MHz (HD Radio)
- Branding: 100.3 KRRV

Programming
- Language: English
- Format: Country
- Subchannels: HD2: Oldies "K-Dixie"
- Affiliations: Westwood One

Ownership
- Owner: Cenla Broadcasting; (Cenla Broadcasting Licensing Company, LLC)
- Sister stations: KDBS, KKST, KQID-FM, KSYL, KZMZ

History
- First air date: 1977
- Call sign meaning: Red River Valley

Technical information
- Licensing authority: FCC
- Facility ID: 33768
- Class: C0
- ERP: 100,000 watts
- HAAT: 321 meters (1,053 ft)
- Transmitter coordinates: 31°1′59.00″N 92°30′8.00″W

Links
- Public license information: Public file; LMS
- Webcast: Listen live Listen live (HD2)
- Website: krrvonline.com kdixie.com (HD2)

KRRV-FM (100.3 MHz) is an American radio station broadcasting a country music format. Licensed to Alexandria, Louisiana, United States, the station serves the Alexandria area. The station is currently owned by Cenla Broadcasting Licensing Company, LLC. Its studios are located on Texas Avenue in Alexandria, and its transmitter is located near Forest Hill, Louisiana.

== History ==
Previous logo

KRRV was started in 1977 by Jerry Jones better known as the Ol' Jaybird. It was started as a country station. The Ol' Jaybird stayed until his death in 1998. Danny White is currently the longest running dj at KRRV he has been there for over 20 years. KRRV is the only station in central Louisiana that has not changed its format or callsign. KRRV also supports St. Judes and broadcast the St. Judes Country Cares for Kids radiothon the third Thursday and Friday of March. In the 1980s The Ol' Jaybird created a classic country show called Solid Gold Saturday Night. In the early 1990s the show was moved to Sunday and was appropriately renamed Solid Gold Sunday. After the move to Sunday Solid Gold Sunday was an all day show and would alternate starting with The Ol' Jabird from 6am-12pm and end with Danny White from 12pm-6pm until the Ol' Jaybird died in 1998. But that did not spell the end of Solid Gold Sunday. Now Solid Gold Sunday airs from 6am-12pm with sole host Danny White. Danny White is the longest running DJ in central Louisiana he has been heard on the radio for over 35 years he started put at KSYL and moved to KRRV. In 1982 the Ol' Jaybird and Danny White made a song called Okie From Tiogi mocking Merle Haggards Okie from Muskogee. Okie From Tiogi is the most requested song on Solid Gold Sunday. Solid Gold Sunday is also the most listened to classic country show in Central Louisiana.

== KRRV-FM-HD2 ==
KRRV-FM-HD2 100.3

KRRV-FM-HD2 is Broadcasting an oldies format in Alexandria, Louisiana. The oldies format used to be on KDBS 1410 for 2 years from 2006 to 2008.

== KRRV-FM-HD3 ==
- HD3 simulcasts the programming of KSYL Cenla Talkradio and FM translator K285HF.
