= WRNO-FM =

Radio station in New Orleans, Louisiana

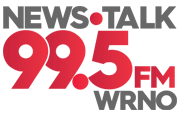
- New Orleans, Louisiana; United States
- Broadcast area: New Orleans metropolitan area
- Frequency: 99.5 MHz (HD Radio)
- Branding: News Talk 99.5 WRNO

Programming
- Format: News/talk
- Subchannels: HD2: Classic hip hop
- Network: Fox News Radio
- Affiliations: Premiere Networks; Westwood One

Ownership
- Owner: iHeartMedia, Inc.; (iHM Licenses, LLC)
- Sister stations: WNOE-FM, WODT, WQUE-FM, WYLD, WYLD-FM, WFFX

History
- First air date: October 17, 1967; 58 years ago
- Call sign meaning: Westbank Radio New Orleans

Technical information
- Facility ID: 54890
- Class: C0
- ERP: 100,000 watts
- HAAT: 306 meters (1004 ft)
- Transmitter coordinates: 29.983°N 89.953°W
- Translator: HD2: 96.3 K242CE (Meraux)

Links
- Webcast: Listen Live
- Website: wrno.iheart.com

WRNO-FM (99.5 MHz) – branded News Talk 99.5 WRNO – is a commercial radio station in New Orleans, Louisiana. It airs a news/talk format and is owned by iHeartMedia, Inc. The studios and offices are on Howard Avenue in Downtown New Orleans.

WRNO-FM has an effective radiated power (ERP) of 100,000 watts, the maximum for most FM stations. The transmitter is off Paris Road in the Bayou Bienvenue Central Wetland District near Chalmette. It broadcasts using HD Radio technology. The HD-2 digital subchannel airs "Throwback 96.3," a classic hip-hop format which feeds 250-watt FM translator K242CE at 96.3 MHz in Meraux.

== Programming ==
WRNO-FM's weekday line up is all syndicated talk shows, beginning with Walton & Johnson from KPRC Houston, followed by The Glenn Beck Radio Program (which is also replayed in the evening hours), The Clay Travis and Buck Sexton Show, The Sean Hannity Show, The Michael Berry Show, The Jesse Kelly Show, Coast to Coast AM with George Noory and America in the Morning.

Weekend programming features shows on money, health, law and technology, some of which are paid brokered programming. Syndicated shows include Handel on the Law with Bill Handel, Armstrong & Getty and The Jesus Christ Show. Most hours begin with an update from Fox News Radio.

== History ==
=== Early years ===
On October 17, 1967, WRNO first signed on the air. It was a stand-alone FM station, put on the air by Gulf South Broadcasters, with Joseph Costello III as the owner and general manager. The station had its studios at 3230 Patterson Drive. It was a network affiliate of the Mutual Broadcasting System and aired a Progressive Rock format.

Although its previous slogan was "We're the Rock of New Orleans," the station's call letters actually stand for "Westbank Radio New Orleans." The station operated a popular business selling rock t-shirts, records and other music related items called the WRNO "Rock Shop" on the ground level of the studio. Since its inception in 1967, WRNO moved from Progressive to Album Rock in the 1980s, and switched to Classic Rock in 1997. WRNO was also home to a popular shortwave radio service in the 1980s and 1990s called WRNO Worldwide, now owned by a Christian broadcaster.

In 1998, WRNO was acquired by Centennial Broadcasting. Then in 2002, the station changed hands again, acquired by San Antonio-based Clear Channel Communications, the forerunner to today's owner, iHeartMedia, Inc.

=== Talk Radio ===
In early November, 2006, management planned a major change. WRNO began stunting by playing the full album version of Whole Lotta Love by Led Zeppelin for at least a week on 24 hour rotation. On November 13, at 4:00 AM, after signing off with The Doors' "The End," WRNO flipped from rock music to a talk radio format as "The New 99.5FM.com." As explained in the official mission statement posted at its website, "The station is committed to providing listeners with everything they need to know on the radio at 99.5 FM and on demand at thenew995fm.com." On the same day, sister station 104.3 KHEV became "The Rock of New Orleans," as it flipped from Urban Gospel to Active Rock.

On April 1, 2008, WRNO changed its slogan to "Rush Radio," with all-day repeats of The Rush Limbaugh Show. It also aired a tape loop of Limbaugh's theme song, the instrumental from My City Was Gone by The Pretenders, during times when the show was not playing. The stunt was to celebrate WRNO's acquisition of the show from longtime affiliate 870 WWL. WRNO resumed its regular schedule on April 7, with Limbaugh heard from 11 a.m. to 2 p.m. weekdays plus a repeat on Saturdays. The Limbaugh program had previously aired on WRNO Worldwide, which Limbaugh called "The EIB World Service" on the air (in joking reference to the BBC World Service). The stations are no longer co-owned.

In September 2014, WRNO re-branded as "News Talk 99.5 WRNO."

=== Past personalities ===
Notable station alumni include Bill Burkett, E.Alvin Davis, Joe Clark, Bobby Reno (later on WTIX-FM owned by Michael Costello, Joe's brother), Captain Humble, Doug Christian, and Russ Boney.

WRNO alumni also include former PD Michael Costello ("Michael In The Morning" and brother of late WRNO founder/owner Joseph Costello III), Jim White, DJ-turned-actor John Larroquette, Soxless Scott Seagraves, Jeff "JD The DJ" Douglas ("Rock 'n' Roll Flight To Midnight"), Tom Owens, Jimbo Roberts, Mitch McCracken, Johnny Tyler, "Weerd" Wayne Watkins, Mary London, Lyn Taylor and writer-producer Vance DeGeneres. Steve Suter (later on Magic 101.9 WLMG) did the morning show with sidekick Kevin Carlile, as the "Morning Dudes."
