= KRVE =

Radio station in Brusly-Baton Rouge, Louisiana

- Brusly, Louisiana; United States
- Broadcast area: Greater Baton Rouge
- Frequency: 96.1 MHz (HD Radio)
- Branding: 96.1 The River

Programming
- Format: Adult contemporary
- Subchannels: HD2: Worship music "Air1"
- Affiliations: Premiere Networks

Ownership
- Owner: iHeartMedia, Inc.; (iHM Licenses, LLC)
- Sister stations: WFMF, WJBO, WYNK-FM, KVDU

History
- First air date: August 18, 1989; 36 years ago
- Former call signs: KIEZ (1989–91)
- Former frequencies: 96.3 MHz (1989–91)
- Call sign meaning: K RiVEr (a reference to the nearby Mississippi River)

Technical information
- Licensing authority: FCC
- Facility ID: 40866
- Class: C2
- ERP: 50,000 watts
- HAAT: 137 meters (449 ft)
- Transmitter coordinates: 30°29′37.00″N 91°0′19.00″W
- Translator: HD2: 101.1 W266CD (Baton Rouge)

Links
- Public license information: Public file; LMS
- Webcast: Listen Live
- Website: 961theriver.iheart.com

KRVE (96.1 FM) is a commercial radio station licensed to Brusly, Louisiana, and serving the Baton Rouge metropolitan area. It broadcasts an adult contemporary radio format, switching to Christmas music for much of November and December. KRVE is owned by iHeartMedia, Inc. with its radio studios and offices located east of downtown Baton Rouge near the I-10/I-12 interchange. It is known as "96.1 The River."

KRVE has an effective radiated power (ERP) of 50,000 watts. The transmitter is on Frenchtown Road in Central, Louisiana. KRVE broadcasts using HD Radio technology. The HD2 digital subchannel carries a worship music format known as "Air1." That feeds 99 watt FM translator W266CD at 101.1 MHz in Baton Rouge.

== Programming ==
KRVE is the flagship station for the nationally syndicated morning drive time show "Murphy, Sam and Jodi". On weeknights, it also carries the syndicated call-in and request show "Delilah". Ellen K is heard Saturday mornings, and American Top 40: The '80s on Saturday nights. All four shows are distributed by co-owned Premiere Networks.

== History ==
The station was originally at 96.3, and was assigned the call letters KIEZ on August 18, 1989. On September 9, 1989, it officially signed on the air. As the call sign indicated, it had an easy listening format and was owned by McForhun, Inc. The studios were on Hatchell Lane in Denham Springs.

On July 15, 1991, the station changed its call sign to the current KRVE. In addition, it moved to 96.1 that year. The KRVE call letters were previously owned by a Portuguese language FM radio station (now contemporary Christian station KJLV) in San Jose, California.
