= WQUE-FM =

Coordinates: 29.920°N 90.025°W

- New Orleans, Louisiana; United States
- Broadcast area: New Orleans metropolitan area
- Frequency: 93.3 MHz (HD Radio)
- Branding: Q93

Programming
- Format: Urban contemporary
- Affiliations: Premiere Networks

Ownership
- Owner: iHeartMedia, Inc.; (iHM Licenses, LLC)
- Sister stations: WFFX, WNOE-FM, WODT, WRNO-FM, WYLD, WYLD-FM

History
- First air date: January 1, 1949
- Former call signs: WDSU-FM (1949–1973)
- Call sign meaning: "Q" is sounded out as in "Que" or "Cue"

Technical information
- Licensing authority: FCC
- Facility ID: 11915
- Class: C0
- ERP: 100,000 watts
- HAAT: 300 meters (980 ft)

Links
- Public license information: Public file; LMS
- Webcast: Listen live (via iHeartRadio)
- Website: q93.iheart.com

WQUE-FM (93.3 MHz, "Q93.3") is a commercial radio station in New Orleans, Louisiana. It airs an urban contemporary format and is owned by iHeartMedia, Inc. WQUE-FM's studios are located on Poydras Street in downtown New Orleans.

WQUE-FM is a Class C0 FM station. It has an effective radiated power (ERP) of 100,000 watts, the maximum for most FM stations. The transmitter is off Behrman Highway in New Orleans' Algiers district.

== History ==
The station signed on the air on January 1, 1949. Its call sign was WDSU-FM, as the sister station of WDSU 1280 (now WODT) and WDSU-TV 6, which went on the air the previous year. WDSU-FM originally broadcast on 105.3 MHz and was powered at 17,000 watts, a fraction of its current output. It largely simulcast WDSU 1280, as affiliates of NBC Radio. The studios were at 520 Royal Street. In the 1960s, WDSU-FM moved to 93.3 MHz. (WWL-FM is now on the 105.3 frequency.)

The radio stations were sold to Covenant Broadcasting in 1972. At 5:30 a.m. on January 5, 1973, the FM station would become Top 40-formatted WQUE "Stereo 93", as the AM station would become WGSO with a full service adult contemporary format of popular music, news and talk.

Around 1984, the AM station also took the WQUE call sign and the two stations returned to simulcasting, this time both as "Q93". They continued as Top 40 outlets, competing with WTIX 690 AM (now WQNO).

In 1992, the two stations were acquired by San Antonio-based Clear Channel Communications (the forerunner to iHeartMedia). Under Clear Channel, WQUE-FM made the transition to urban contemporary music. It has become one of the top stations in New Orleans. From 2006 to 2014, it was the home of the Steve Harvey Morning Show, which now airs on sister station 98.5 WYLD-FM. In January 2014, WQUE became the home of The Breakfast Club from co-owned WWPR-FM in New York City. It is hosted by Charlamagne tha God, DJ Envy and Jess Hilarious.
