= Hultberg =

Hultberg is a surname. Notable people with the surname include:

- Johan Hultberg (born 1985), Swedish politician
- John Hultberg (1922–2005), American painter
- Jordy Hultberg, American basketball player and coach
- Otto Hultberg (1877–1954), Swedish sport shooter
- Peer Hultberg (1935–2007), Danish writer and psychoanalyst
- Poul Hultberg (1920–2016), Danish architect
