= WDGL =

Radio station in Baton Rouge, Louisiana

Coordinates: 30.366°N 91.213°W

- Baton Rouge, Louisiana; United States
- Broadcast area: Baton Rouge metropolitan area (secondary coverage of Lafayette, Louisiana)
- Frequency: 98.1 MHz (HD Radio)
- Branding: Eagle 98.1

Programming
- Format: Classic rock
- Subchannels: HD2: WNXX simulcast
- Affiliations: LSU Sports Network (football, men's basketball, baseball); New Orleans Saints Radio Network

Ownership
- Owner: Guaranty Broadcasting
- Sister stations: KNXX, WBRP, WNXX, WTGE

History
- First air date: October 1, 1968
- Former call signs: WAFB-FM (1968–1985); WGGZ (1985–1997)
- Call sign meaning: Eagle

Technical information
- Licensing authority: FCC
- Facility ID: 25518
- Class: C
- ERP: 100,000 watts
- HAAT: 459 meters (1,506 ft)

Links
- Public license information: Public file; LMS
- Webcast: Listen live
- Website: eagle981.com

WDGL (98.1 FM, "Eagle 98.1") is a commercial radio station licensed to Baton Rouge, Louisiana. The station is owned by Guaranty Broadcasting, and airs a classic rock radio format. WDGL calls itself "The ROCK Station." It is the flagship radio station for the Louisiana State University Tigers sports broadcasts, sharing that status with WWL in New Orleans. Since 2013, it is the Capital Region's affiliate for New Orleans Saints games. Along with four sister stations, its studios and offices are in the Guaranty Group building on Government Street east of downtown.

The station is an affiliate of the weekly syndicated Pink Floyd program "Floydian Slip."

WDGL has an effective radiated power (ERP) of 100,000 watts, the highest permitted for non-grandfathered FM stations. The transmitter is located south of the LSU campus near the east bank of the Mississippi River.

== History ==
In 1941, when few people had an FM receiver, the 98.1 spot on the Baton Rouge dial was occupied by an FM station owned by WJBO. It had the call sign WBRL. It later moved to 101.5 as WJBO-FM. It finally switched to 102.5 MHz and is today WFMF-FM.

On October 1, 1968, a new FM station signed on at 98.1 MHz as WAFB-FM. Then, as now, it was owned by Guaranty Broadcasting, which already owned a TV station in Baton Rouge, Channel 9 WAFB-TV. WAFB-FM was affiliated with the ABC Contemporary Radio Network and during that time the station aired a contemporary hits format. In the mid-1990s, it affiliated with Unistar Radio. Some formats over the years included easy listening, soft rock and disco music. In 1985, it returned to Top 40 as WGGZ, calling itself "Z98," then oldies as "Oldies 98.1".

In 1995, WGGZ flipped to classic hits as "Eagle 98.1, Rock and Roll Classics." A few months later, WGGZ shifted to a classic rock format. In 1997, it switched to the call letters WDGL to go with its Eagle branding.
