= J.C. Politz =

American sportscaster

- Born: December 2, 1924; Napoleonville, Louisiana, U.S.
- Died: 2006 (aged 81–82)
- Education: Louisiana State University
- Occupation: Sports announcer

J.C. Politz (December 2, 1924 – 2006) was an American sportscaster best known for calling games for the Southern Jaguars football team, LSU Tigers basketball and football teams and St. Louis Cardinals (NFL). He also called games for the Tulane Green Wave, Southeastern Louisiana Lions, Southern Mississippi Golden Eagles, New Mexico Lobos and New Orleans Privateers.

== Biography ==
J.C. Politz was born on December 2, 1924, in Napoleonville, Louisiana. He was a gunner on a B-24 flying over Europe in World War II. After the war, he attended Louisiana State University and graduated in 1953. He worked at several radio stations and WBRZ-TV in Baton Rouge, Louisiana. His first job calling games was with the Southern Jaguars in the mid-1950s. After the 1958 season, John Ferguson left LSU and Politz was hired for the 1959 football season to broadcast LSU football and men's basketball. During the 1959 football season, Politz called what could arguably be one of the more memorable plays in college football history. He was the radio announcer during Billy Cannon's Halloween run versus Ole Miss. Politz remained at LSU through the 1960 season before John Ferguson returned for 1961.

After leaving LSU, Politz spent three years calling St. Louis Cardinals (NFL) football games for KMOX-AM before returning to Baton Rouge. He called games for the Tulane Green Wave, Southeastern Louisiana Lions, Southern Mississippi Golden Eagles, New Mexico Lobos and New Orleans Privateers. He returned to Southern University in the 1990s and called his final game on November 30, 2002, in the Bayou Classic.

Politz died in 2006 at the age of 81 in Baton Rouge, Louisiana.

== See also ==
- LSU Sports Network
