= KQID-FM =

Radio station in Alexandria, Louisiana

- Alexandria, Louisiana; United States
- Broadcast area: Alexandria-Pineville
- Frequency: 93.1 MHz (HD Radio)
- Branding: Q93

Programming
- Language: English
- Format: Contemporary hit radio
- Subchannels: HD2: Soft AC; HD3: Sports (KDBS)
- Affiliations: Compass Media Networks; Premiere Networks

Ownership
- Owner: Cenla Broadcasting; (Cenla Broadcasting Licensing Company, LLC)
- Sister stations: KDBS, KKST, KRRV-FM, KSYL, KZMZ

History
- First air date: September 17, 1978

Technical information
- Licensing authority: FCC
- Facility ID: 9751
- Class: C
- ERP: 100,000 watts
- HAAT: 464 meters (1,522 ft)
- Transmitter coordinates: 31°38′20.00″N 92°12′18.00″W
- Translator: HD2: 100.9 K265FB (Alexandria)

Links
- Public license information: Public file; LMS
- Webcast: Listen live; Listen live (HD2)
- Website: Q93; KQID-HD2 Online (HD2)

KQID-FM (93.1 MHz, "Q93") is an American Top 40 (CHR) radio station licensed to Alexandria, Louisiana. The station serves the Central Louisiana, northern Acadiana, Natchez, Mississippi, and Monroe, Louisiana. The station is owned by Cenla Broadcasting. Its studios are located on Texas Avenue in Alexandria, and its transmitter is located southwest of Jena, Louisiana.

== KQID-FM-HD2 ==
KQID-FM's second HD Radio channel carries a Soft adult contemporary format, branded "Magic 100.9" in reflection of its simulcast on FM translator K265FB (100.9).

| Call sign | Frequency | City of license | FID | ERP (W) | Class | Transmitter coordinates | FCC info |
|---|---|---|---|---|---|---|---|
| K265FB | 100.9 FM | Alexandria, Louisiana | 138963 | 250 | D | 31°18′25.0″N 92°24′12.0″W | LMS |

== KQID-FM-HD3 ==
KQID-HD3 simulcasts the programming of KDBS 1410 AM "ESPN 94.7" and FM translator K234CY 94.7 FM.
