= Jordy Hultberg =

American basketball player, coach, and broadcaster

Jordy Hultberg, is a former LSU basketball player (1976–80) and assistant basketball coach under Dale Brown (1980–83). Hultberg later became a broadcaster for LSU and the New Orleans Hornets.

== Athletic career ==
Hultberg was a shooting guard at LSU on Dale Brown's teams from 1976 to 1980. He was noted for his long shots before there was a three-point line in college basketball.

== Coaching career ==
After playing under Brown at LSU for four years, Hultberg became one of his assistant coaches from 1980 to 1983.

== Broadcasting career ==
=== LSU ===
In 1983, Jordy began his broadcasting career as a color commentator for the (then) newly developed LSU pay-per-view system known as "Tigervision". From 1988 to 1990, Hultberg also served as a color analyst for syndicated SEC Basketball broadcasts produced by Jefferson Pilot Teleproductions. He was a sideline reporter for both the LSU Sports Radio Network broadcasts and the Cox Sports Television broadcasts of the LSU football games. He also hosted multiple shows on the LSU Sports Radio Network such as LSU Sunday Night Live, LSU Sports Journal and Inside LSU Football with Les Miles. He is also the host for LSU Tiger Tracks on Cox Sports Television.

=== New Orleans Hornets ===
Hultberg hosted Hornets Tonight, a pre-game show prior to every New Orleans Hornets telecast on Cox Sports Television. He also served as the courtside reporter and hosted the post-game show for the Hornets along with hosting the weekly Hornets Coaches Show.

=== Radio ===
Hultberg hosted a local radio show in Baton Rouge called "The Jordy Hultberg Show" on KKAY (1590 AM) in Baton Rouge from 7-9am Monday through Friday. Currently, Hultberg hosts a local radio show on KLWB-FM (103.7 FM, an ESPN Radio affiliate) in Lafayette in that same 7-9am Monday through Friday time slot.

== See also ==
- List of New Orleans Pelicans broadcasters
