= Grethe Heltberg =

Danish writer

Astrid Grethe Grouleff Heltberg (27 May 1911 – 1996) was a Danish writer.

The daughter of J C Agerskov and Eva Grouleff, she was born Astrid Grethe Agerskov in Horsens and graduated from Horsens Statsskole in 1929. From 1930 to 1940, she worked as a stenographer at the Rigsdagen.

In 1942, she published a collection of poetry Portræt af en pige. Besides writing essays, memoirs, novels, short stories and children's books, she also published articles in newspapers, magazines and journals. From 1957 to 1972, she was a member of Dansk Forfatterforening, the Danish writers' association. She won a number of awards over the years as well as receiving funding from the Statens Kunstfond. She was also awarded the Tagea Brandts Rejselegat (Travel Scholarship) in 1973.

In 1934, she married Niels Heltberg. Her daughter Bettina became a writer and actor.

== Selected works ==
- Testamente, poetry (1945)
- Kinesisk lak, poetry (1948)
- Pige fra provinsen (1969)
- En jomfru fra Jylland (1969)
- Vi (1971)
- En gnist af glæde, memoir (1975)
- Alle mine søstre, poetry (1976)
