= WJBO =

Talk radio station in Baton Rouge, Louisiana

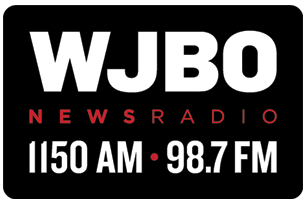
- Baton Rouge, Louisiana; United States
- Broadcast area: Baton Rouge metropolitan area
- Frequency: 1150 kHz
- Branding: WJBO Newsradio 1150 AM & 98.7 FM

Programming
- Format: Conservative Talk
- Network: Fox News Radio
- Affiliations: Premiere Networks; Compass Media Networks

Ownership
- Owner: iHeartMedia, Inc.; (iHM Licenses, LLC)
- Sister stations: KRVE, WFMF, WYNK-FM, KVDU

History
- First air date: April 17, 1922 (in New Orleans; moved to Baton Rouge in 1934)
- Former call signs: WAAB (1922–1926)

Technical information
- Licensing authority: FCC
- Facility ID: 4054
- Class: B
- Power: 15,000 watts (day); 5,000 watts (night)
- Transmitter coordinates: 30°27′47″N 91°16′10″W
- Translator: 98.7 K254DM (Baton Rouge)
- Repeater: 102.5 WFMF-HD2 (Baton Rouge)

Links
- Public license information: Public file; LMS
- Webcast: Listen live (via iHeartRadio)
- Website: wjbo.iheart.com

WJBO (1150 AM) is a commercial radio station in Baton Rouge, Louisiana, calling itself "WJBO Newsradio 1150 AM & 98.7 FM." It carries a talk format and is owned by iHeartMedia, Inc. The studios are on Hilton Avenue, east of downtown Baton Rouge.

By day, WJBO is powered at 15,000 watts. But at night, to avoid interfering with other stations on 1150 AM, it reduces power to 5,000 watts. It uses a directional antenna with a four-tower array. The transmitter site is on Rosedale Road (Louisiana Highway 76) in Port Allen. Programming is also heard on 250-watt FM translator K254DM at 98.7 MHz.

== History ==
=== WAAB ===
The station was first licensed on April 17, 1922. It was given with the sequentially-assigned call letters WAAB and was owned by the New Orleans Times-Picayune newspaper. It was one of the first stations to receive a 4-letter call sign starting with a "W". WAAB made its debut broadcast on the evening of April 6, 1922.

A few months later ownership was transferred to the station's primary operator, Valdemar Jensen, at 137 South Saint Patrick Street. Jensen operated and experimented with the station from his house's basement.

=== WJBO ===
In early 1926, the call letters were changed to WJBO. They stood for the Jensen Broadcasting Organization. The station began a policy of selling airtime. Following a few days of test transmissions, the station made its formal debut as "the first commercially operated radio station in the South" on February 28, 1926.

WJBO was one of the first stations to regularly broadcast news, working in tandem with The Times-Picayune. Jensen broadcast from the Roosevelt Hotel and Orpheum Theater. In 1932, he sold WJBO to the Manship family, owners of The Advocate newspaper in Baton Rouge. The Manships moved the station to Baton Rouge in December 1934 as the capital's first commercial radio station. It operated at 1420 kilocycles as a 100-watt daytimer.

By the early 1940s, the station's frequency had moved to 1150 kHz and its power increased to 500 watts. In 1941, WJBO's power got a big boost to 5,000 watts. Originally, the station broadcast from Highland Road in South Baton Rouge, but in 1941, a new studio was built on Florida Street to accommodate the growing station.

WJBO was affiliated with the NBC Blue Network from 1937 until 1948. (NBC Blue later became ABC.) In 1948, with the launch of radio station WLCS (precursor to now defunct station WUBR), WJBO affiliated itself with the NBC Red Network. It stayed an NBC affiliate until 1979. From 1976 until it folded, WJBO was also affiliated with the Mutual Broadcasting System (MBS), and in the late 1970s, was also affiliated with APR.

In 1941, WJBO signed on an FM counterpart on 44.5 megacycles, originally as W45BR. In 1959, the call letters changed to WJBO-FM. WJBO-FM later moved to 102.5 MHz, and its call letters changed to WFMF in 1974. (The original 98.1 frequency is now occupied by WDGL.) It acquired a television sister in 1955, when WBRZ-TV signed on as an NBC-TV affiliate. (It is now the capital's ABC affiliate.)

=== MOR and Talk ===
As network programming moved from radio to television in the 1950s, WJBO switched to a full service, middle of the road music format, including news, sports and talk. In the 1970s and '80s, as listeners tuned increasingly to FM for music, WJBO added more talk programming.

In the 1980s, music programming was eliminated and WJBO became a full time talk station. In 1989, the Manship family sold WJBO and WFMF to station manager George Jenne. Following the sale, WJBO affiliated itself with an array of talk radio and news networks including: ABC Talkradio, CBS Radio News, NBC Radio News, Associated Press Radio, NBC Talknet, Transtar, United Stations Radio Network, and Westwood One. Under the ownership of Jenne, the WJBO and WFMF studios moved from their location on Florida Street in downtown Baton Rouge (where they broadcast since 1941) to new studios on Corporate Blvd. In 1995, Jenne sold the stations to Gulfstar Communications. The station came under ownership of Clear Channel Communications when Gulfstar folded. In 2014, Clear Channel changed its name to iHeartMedia, Inc.

The station was the Baton Rouge affiliate of the New Orleans Saints radio network until the 2009 season. For decades, it also served as the flagship station for LSU Tigers college football and basketball games.

== See also ==
- List of initial AM-band station grants in the United States
