= KNXX =

Radio station in Donaldsonville–Baton Rouge, Louisiana

Coordinates: 30.099°N 91.004°W

Simulcasting WNXX Jackson, LA
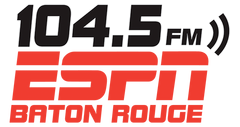
- Donaldsonville, Louisiana; United States
- Broadcast area: Baton Rouge, Louisiana
- Frequency: 104.9 MHz
- Branding: 104.5 ESPN Baton Rouge

Programming
- Format: Sports
- Affiliations: ESPN Radio

Ownership
- Owner: Guaranty Broadcasting
- Sister stations: WBRP, WDGL, WNXX, WTGE

History
- First air date: 1972
- Former call signs: KSMI-FM (1972–1986); KKAY-FM (1986–2001); KNXX (2001–2011); KYPY (2011–2013)

Technical information
- Licensing authority: FCC
- Facility ID: 36160
- Class: A
- ERP: 3,000 watts
- HAAT: 146 meters

Links
- Public license information: Public file; LMS
- Webcast: Listen Live
- Website: 1045espn.com

KNXX (104.9 FM) is a commercial radio station located in Donaldsonville, Louisiana, United States, broadcasting to the southern areas of the Baton Rouge area. Along with four other sister stations, its studios are housed at the Guaranty Group building on Government Street east of downtown, and its transmitter is located in Donaldsonville.

In December 2009, WNXX flipped to ESPN Radio.

== History ==
In September 2000, New Radco LLC of Slidell, Louisiana, (Michael F. Starr, 57% owner) reached an agreement to sell WBJJ (now WNXX) to Guaranty Broadcasting Corporation (George A. Foster Jr., president) for a reported $1.044 million. At the time of the sale, the station broadcast an urban contemporary music format.

Both stations have had a history of various formats, most notably adult R&B at 104.5 (from the 1990s to 2000 and from 2001 to 2003) and rhythmic oldies at 104.9 (late 1990s to 2001).

In 2000, the 104.5 signal became a modern rock outlet, only to move over to 104.9 in 2001.

In 2003, both stations became a simulcast and adopted the "104 The X" handle.

In 2007 and 2008, 104 The X presented X-Fest at the Baton Rouge River Center. Among the performers at those events were the Killers, AFI, Jet, Papa Roach, The Howling Bells, Saosin, The Red Jumpsuit Apparatus(2007) and My Chemical Romance, Puddle of Mudd, Finger Eleven, Atreyu, Story of the Year, Billy Talent, Meriwether (2008). It also presented the "X-mas Bash" in 2006 (featuring 30 Seconds to Mars), 2007 (featuring Atreyu, Shiny Toy Guns, Flyleaf) and 2008 (featuring Death Cab For Cutie, Snow Patrol, Carolina Liar).

In November 2010, KNXX added Skratch 'N Sniff which was broadcast on Saturday nights from 10pm - midnight, and a live concert series, which it called X-In-Concert, and was broadcast on Sunday nights at 8pm. X-In-Concert featured a live concert by a different artist each week.

The-X was a spin-off station of WDGL while they were only playing classic rock.

Beginning in April 2011, KNXX switched to a classic country format playing country music from the 60’s, 70’s, & 80’s branded as "Country Legends 104.9" and changed the call letters to KYPY. Roland’s Swamp Pop Café is heard weekdays from 11AM to 1PM. Spin-off of sister station WTGE that was playing only new country at the time.

In August 2013, the station announced that it would flip back to its former simulcast with WNXX as ESPN Radio; it returned to the KNXX call letters that same year.
