= WYLD (AM) =

Coordinates: 29°53′57.7″N 90°0′17.3″W

- New Orleans, Louisiana; United States
- Broadcast area: New Orleans metropolitan area
- Frequency: 940 kHz C-QUAM AM stereo
- Branding: Hallelujah 940

Programming
- Format: Urban gospel

Ownership
- Owner: iHeartMedia, Inc.; (iHM Licenses, LLC)
- Sister stations: WFFX; WNOE-FM; WODT; WQUE-FM; WRNO-FM; WYLD-FM

History
- First air date: 1948 (as WTPS)
- Former call signs: WTPS (1948–1958)
- Call sign meaning: play on the word "wild"

Technical information
- Licensing authority: FCC
- Facility ID: 60707
- Class: B
- Power: 10,000 watts day; 500 watts night

Links
- Public license information: Public file; LMS
- Webcast: Listen live (via iHeartRadio)
- Website: hallelujah940.iheart.com

WYLD (940 kHz) is a commercial AM radio station in New Orleans, Louisiana. The station is owned by iHeartMedia, Inc., and it broadcasts an urban gospel radio format, known as "Hallelujah 940" Some Christian talk and teaching programs are also heard.

By day, WYLD’s transmitter power output is 10,000 watts. Because 940 AM is a clear channel frequency reserved for Class A stations XEQ in Mexico City and CFNV in Montreal, WYLD must reduce its power at night to 500 watts to avoid interference. It uses a directional antenna at all times. The transmitter is off Tullis Drive in the Algiers district of New Orleans.

== History ==
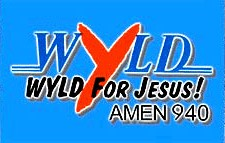
Logo as "Amen 940", used c. 2005

When it signed on in 1948, the station's call sign was WTPS. It was owned by the New Orleans Times-Picayune daily newspaper (the call sign stood for "Times-Picayune Station") and was a network affiliate of the Mutual Broadcasting System.

In 1958, it became WYLD. WYLD was a successful rhythm and blues (R&B) outlet in the 1960s and 1970s, serving New Orleans' large African-American community. When it added an FM sister station in 1975, the urban contemporary format shifted to WYLD-FM 98.5. The AM station evolved to a community-oriented R&B and soul music sound in the 1980s to its current format in the 1990s.

On May 24, 2017, WYLD rebranded as "Hallelujah 940".

On April 27, 2020, the station began broadcasting in C-QUAM AM stereo using a new Nautel NX-10 transmitter. It uses MDCL, Modulation Density Carrier Level, during the daytime hours only.
