= WUBR =

Currently silent
- Baton Rouge, Louisiana; United States
- Frequency: 910 kHz

Ownership
- Owner: Ana and Freddy Cruz; (Power 102.1 FM LLC)

History
- First air date: November 1, 1946
- Former call signs: WLCS (1946–1984); WXAM (1984–1988); WTGE (1988–1989); WNDC (1989–2006)
- Former frequencies: 1400 kHz (1946–1951)
- Call sign meaning: We're yours, Baton Rouge

Technical information
- Licensing authority: FCC
- Facility ID: 11188
- Class: D
- Power: 1,200 watts (day); 51 watts (night)
- Transmitter coordinates: 30°34′48″N 91°07′50″W

Links
- Public license information: Public file; LMS

WUBR (910 AM) is a radio station licensed to Baton Rouge, Louisiana. It is owned by Ana and Freddy Cruz, through licensee Power 102.1 FM LLC. It had been airing a sports radio format but as of November 7, 2007, the station is listed as "licensed and silent" in the FCC database.

The station was assigned the WUBR call letters by the Federal Communications Commission on March 21, 2006.

== History ==
=== Early years ===
WLCS signed on November 1, 1946, taking the ABC affiliation from WJBO and was owned by AirWaves Inc. Originally broadcasting on a frequency of 1400 kHz, the station moved to 910 kHz in 1951. It remained an ABC radio affiliate until 1956.

By the early 1970s, the station became a Top 40 outlet, and in 1978, affiliated with UPI Radio. In 1984 it changed owners, going from Airwaves, Inc. (along with sister stations WQXY-FM in Baton Rouge and KQXY-FM in Beaumont, Texas) to Oppenheimer Broadcast Group of Austin, Texas. On September 1, 1984, WLCS changed its calls to WXAM and changed its traditional Contemporary Hit Radio format to satellite-delivered big band and oldies. It changed hands again in 1988 to Vetter Communications, which owned local NBC TV affiliate WVLA-TV) with call letters WTGE. In 1989 the station changed hands again to Church Point Ministries, call letters to WNDC, and flipped to urban gospel but financial problems have resulted in taking the station off the air in 2004.

=== Off the air ===
The station first went silent on October 22, 2004, then resumed broadcasting in October 2005 for a period ending November 16, 2005. The station stayed silent until broadcast operations again resumed on November 12, 2006 then ended again 3 days later. WUBR was again silent until November 6, 2007 but again went silent a day later. FCC rules may force forfeiture of a commercial broadcast license if a station is silent for one full year and these silent periods are just under that limit.

In August 2012, Pelican Broadcasting began management of the station. Local sports programs by Jordy Hultberg, Buddy Songy and Tommy Krysan were in the weekday line up. Fox Sports Radio was the national sports network at first. Then in May 2014, it became affiliated with CBS Sports Radio. But the station left the air again after a short time.

=== Construction permit ===
On September 7, 2007, WUBR was granted a construction permit to relocate the transmitter to 30°38'07"N, 91°09'55"W with a change in daytime power to 1,200 watts and nighttime power to 51 watts. In FCC filings, station ownership stated that it has lost access to the currently licensed transmitter site except for brief periods of broadcasting required to maintain their license. This construction permit expired on March 23, 2009.

As of early 2010, the owners announced a new transmitter site in Zachary, Louisiana, has been finished. But the station remains off the air.
