= KSYL =

- Alexandria, Louisiana; United States
- Broadcast area: Alexandria-Pineville
- Frequency: 970 kHz
- Branding: Talkradio 970 AM

Programming
- Language: English
- Format: Talk radio
- Affiliations: Fox News Radio; Compass Media Networks; Premiere Networks; Westwood One

Ownership
- Owner: Cenla Broadcasting; (Cenla Broadcasting Licensing Company, LLC)
- Sister stations: KDBS; KKST; KQID-FM; KRRV-FM; KZMZ

History
- First air date: June 13, 1946
- Former call signs: KPDR (1946–1948); KVOB (1948–1952)
- Former frequencies: 1490 kHz (1946–1949)
- Call sign meaning: from first name of founder Sylvan Fox

Technical information
- Licensing authority: FCC
- Facility ID: 9750
- Class: D
- Power: 1,000 watts (day); 120 watts (night)
- Transmitter coordinates: 31°19′35.9″N 92°29′22.6″W
- Translator: 104.9 K285HF (Alexandria)
- Repeater: 100.3 KRRV-FM HD3 (Alexandria)

Links
- Public license information: Public file; LMS
- Webcast: Listen live
- Website: ksyl.com

KSYL (970 AM) is an American radio station broadcasting a news/talk format. Licensed to Alexandria, Louisiana, United States, the station is owned by Cenla Broadcasting. Its studios and transmitter are located separately in Alexandria.

The station went on the air June 13, 1946, as KPDR on 1490 kHz; it affiliated with the Mutual Broadcasting System on November 1. It became KVOB on November 24, 1948, and moved to 970 the following year. On May 31, 1952, it became KSYL after being purchased for $58,000 by the owners of KSYL (1400 AM), which surrendered its license. That station was founded by the late Sylvan Robert Fox, not the Sylvan Fox associated with Newsday, a newspaper on Long Island. The KSYL callsign was inspired by Fox's first name.

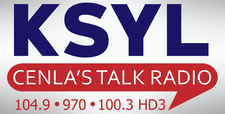
Previous logo
