= WFFX =

Coordinates: 29°58′58″N 89°57′9″W

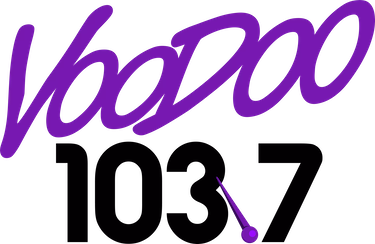
- Marrero, Louisiana; United States
- Broadcast area: New Orleans metropolitan area
- Frequency: 103.7 MHz (HD Radio)
- Branding: Voodoo 103.7

Programming
- Format: Rhythmic adult contemporary

Ownership
- Owner: iHeartMedia, Inc.; (iHM Licenses, LLC)
- Sister stations: WNOE-FM, WODT, WQUE-FM, WRNO-FM, WYLD, WYLD-FM

History
- First air date: July 1, 1966 (as WFOR-FM in Hattiesburg, Mississippi)
- Former call signs: WFOR-FM (1966–1974); WHER (1974–1999); WUSW (1999–2010)
- Call sign meaning: "Fox" (previous format)

Technical information
- Licensing authority: FCC
- Facility ID: 54611
- Class: C2
- ERP: 12,000 watts
- HAAT: 306 meters (1,004 ft)

Links
- Public license information: Public file; LMS
- Webcast: Listen live (via iHeartRadio)
- Website: voodoo1037.iheart.com

WFFX (103.7 FM; "Voodoo 103.7") is a commercial radio station licensed to Marrero, Louisiana, and serving the New Orleans metropolitan area with a rhythmic adult contemporary format. It is owned by iHeartMedia with studios on Poydras Avenue in New Orleans.

WFFX has an effective radiated power (ERP) of 12,000 watts. Its transmitter is on Bayou Bienvenue Way in New Orleans, amid the towers for other local FM and TV stations.

== History ==
=== Early years in Mississippi ===
The station was originally licensed to Hattiesburg, Mississippi, more than 100 miles (180 km) away. It first signed on the air on July 1, 1966. The original call sign was WFOR-FM. The station was owned by J.W. Furr along with WFOR (1400 AM), though the two stations did not simulcast.

By the early 1970s, WFOR-FM programmed easy listening music. The call letters were changed to WHER on October 7, 1974. The easy listening format continued until November 1990, when the station changed to country music as "Eagle 103". In October 1996, WHER shifted to oldies, retaining the "Eagle" name.

J.W. Furr sold his five stations, WHER, WFOR, and three stations in Columbus, Mississippi, in 1998. The new owner was Cumulus Media and the price tag was $4.5 million. In 1999, WHER's oldies programming began airing on WEEZ (99.3 FM) in Heidelberg (near Laurel). In June, that station took on the WHER call sign, with 103.7 becoming WUSW ahead of a return to country music. In 2000, Cumulus swapped 45 stations, including its Laurel–Hattiesburg stations, to Clear Channel Communications (forerunner to iHeartMedia) in exchange for four stations in Harrisburg, Pennsylvania, that Clear Channel had been required to sell as part of its merger with AMFM. By the mid-2000s, WUSW had become a mainstream rock station as "The Fox". The WFFX call sign was assigned January 28, 2010.

=== Move to New Orleans market ===
On October 14, 2024, the station re-located from Hattiesburg to Marrero, Louisiana, in a realignment tied to KVDU (104.1 FM)'s relocation from New Orleans to Baton Rouge following the destruction of its transmitter and tower during Hurricane Ida. WFFX began broadcasting from a tower shared with sister station WRNO-FM. WFFX became a class C2 station, powered at 12,000 watts. At that time, the station dropped its mainstream rock format and began stunting as "Halloween Radio". It played songs with either themes associated with the holiday, or were soundtracks from horror films and spooky television series.

On October 17, 2024, the station flipped to hot adult contemporary as "Voodoo 103.7". It was positioned as "New Orleans' 90s to Now" station, with a new format reviving a brand that had previously been used by KVDU. That station aired a classic hits format focusing on music from the 1980s and 1990s (although it later pivoted to rhythmic adult contemporary and hot AC while under the brand). In November 2025, WFFX switched its format to Christmas music for the holidays, using the slogan "New Orleans' Christmas Music Station" when playing holiday tunes.

On December 26, 2025, WFFX shifted to rhythmic adult contemporary.
