= KVPI-FM =

- Ville Platte, Louisiana; United States
- Broadcast area: Acadiana (North of Lafayette)
- Frequency: 92.5 MHz
- Branding: Classic Hits 92.5 KVPI

Programming
- Format: Classic hits format throughout the day with golden oldies at night/Cajun-Swamp Pop on Fridays
- Affiliations: Fox News Radio; Compass Media Networks; Premiere Networks; United Stations Radio Networks; LSU Sports Radio Network

Ownership
- Owner: Ville Platte Broadcasting Co., Inc.
- Sister stations: KVPI (AM)

History
- First air date: February 26, 1967
- Call sign meaning: Keeping Ville Platte Informed

Technical information
- Licensing authority: FCC
- Facility ID: 37737
- Class: C3
- ERP: 25,000 watts
- HAAT: 62 meters (203 ft)
- Transmitter coordinates: 30.69393°N 92.31263°W

Links
- Public license information: Public file; LMS
- Webcast: Listen Live
- Website: classichits925.com

KVPI-FM (92.5 MHz, "Classic Hits 92.5") is a radio station playing classic hits from the 70's, 80's, & 90's during the day while playing 50's & 60's oldies at night and playing swamp pop music on Fridays, licensed to Ville Platte, Louisiana. The station is owned by Ville Platte Broadcasting Co., Inc.
