= WODT =

Black Information Network affiliate radio station in New Orleans, Louisiana

- New Orleans, Louisiana; United States
- Broadcast area: New Orleans metropolitan area
- Frequency: 1280 kHz
- Branding: New Orleans' BIN 1280

Programming
- Format: Black-oriented news
- Affiliations: Black Information Network

Ownership
- Owner: iHeartMedia, Inc.; (iHM Licenses, LLC)
- Sister stations: WFFX, WNOE-FM, WQUE-FM, WRNO-FM, WYLD, WYLD-FM

History
- First air date: July 23, 1923; 102 years ago (as WCBE)
- Former call signs: WCBE (1923–1928); WDSU (1928–1973); WGSO (1973–1985); WMKJ (1985–1987); WQUE (1987–1995)
- Call sign meaning: Who Dat? (New Orleans Saints chant)

Technical information
- Licensing authority: FCC
- Facility ID: 11947
- Class: B
- Power: 5,000 watts unlimited
- Transmitter coordinates: 29°53′43″N 90°00′16″W
- Translator: 96.7 K244FX (New Orleans)

Links
- Public license information: Public file; LMS
- Webcast: Listen Live
- Website: neworleans.binnews.com

WODT (1280 AM) is a commercial radio station in New Orleans, Louisiana. It broadcasts an all-news radio format as an affiliate of the Black Information Network. It is owned by iHeartMedia, Inc., with studios on Howard Avenue.

WODT is powered at 5,000 watts full-time. To protect other stations on 1280 AM from interference, it uses a directional antenna with a three-tower array. The transmitter is in the Algiers district of New Orleans. Programming is also heard on 45-watt FM translator K244FX at 96.7 MHz in New Orleans.

== History ==
=== NBC Blue Network ===
The station made its debut broadcast, as WCBE, on July 23, 1923. The original call sign was randomly assigned from a roster of available call letters. It was owned by Joseph Uhalt and based in his New Orleans backyard. In 1928, he moved the station to the DeSoto Hotel (now the Le Pavillon Hotel) in downtown New Orleans and changed the call letters to WDSU. In the 1930s, WDSU broadcast on 1250 kilocycles and was an affiliate of the NBC Blue Network. It carried its schedule of dramas, comedies, news, sports, soap operas, game shows and big band broadcasts during the "Golden Age of Radio." (The Blue Network became the ABC Radio Network in 1945.)

With the 1941 enactment of the North American Regional Broadcasting Agreement (NARBA), WDSU moved to 1280 kHz. In 1948, it put Louisiana's first television station on the air, WDSU-TV. A year later, it added an FM station, WDSU-FM (now 93.3 WQUE).

The radio stations were sold to Covenant Broadcasting in 1972. At 5:30 a.m. on January 5, 1973, the AM station would become WGSO with a full service adult contemporary format of popular music, news and talk, as the FM station would become Top 40-formatted WQUE "Stereo 93".

Around 1984 it switched to a Top 40/CHR format as "Stereo 13Q" under the WQUE call letters. On December 21, 1985, the station switched to R&B oldies as WMKJ, "Majic 1280". Soon thereafter, it became a simulcast of WQUE-FM after the station evolved to a CHUrban format.

Logo as "Sports 1280"

=== Sports Radio ===
In the early 1990s, WQUE tried an all-sports format that included broadcasts of the New Orleans Saints, but it didn't last long. On February 1, 1996, the station flipped to an all-blues format as WODT. The call sign represented the chant used by fans of the New Orleans Saints, Who dat? Despite good ratings, the format did not attract advertisers.

In October 2003, WODT returned to sports programing from Fox Sports Radio, ESPN Radio and "The Jim Rome Show." WODT was the flagship station of the New Orleans Hornets radio network from 2003–2006. Hornets radio color analyst Gerry Vaillancourt hosted a popular afternoon sports talk call-in show from May 2004—December 2006. The sports format ran for almost five years. The station's final sports-era legal ID was an homage both to the station's small, but loyal following, and to the Jim Rome Show; it contained a frequent Rome Show sign-off clip ("I think what I'm supposed to say is, 'Thank you. I'm out.'")

=== Urban Gospel ===
On June 25, 2008, WODT switched to an urban gospel format, complementing a similar format on sister station WYLD. On September 4, 2012, the station became an affiliate of ESPN Deportes Radio, as a Spanish-language sports outlet.

On September 15, 2014, WODT switched from ESPN Deportes' Spanish-language sports programming back to English-language sports, with programming from Fox Sports Radio. WODT began rebroadcasting on the HD-2 subchannel of co-owned 101.1 WNOE-FM. In 2020, WODT began simulcasting on an FM translator at 96.7 MHz.

=== Black Information Network ===
On June 29, 2020, 15 iHeart stations in markets with large black populations, including WODT New Orleans, began stunting. The speeches of prominent African Americans were aired, interspersed with messages such as "Our Voices Will Be Heard" and "Our Side of the Story is About to be Told,." A new format was slated to debut on June 30.

That day, WODT, along with the other 14 stations, launched the Black Information Network. It broadcasts an African American-oriented all-news format. Local news, traffic and weather updates are integrated into network programming.
