= WTIX-FM =

Oldies radio station in Galliano–New Orleans, Louisiana

Coordinates: 29.563°N 89.830°W

- Galliano, Louisiana; United States
- Broadcast area: New Orleans, Louisiana
- Frequency: 94.3 MHz
- Branding: 94.3 WTIX-FM

Programming
- Format: Oldies

Ownership
- Owner: Fleur de Lis Broadcasting

History
- First air date: November 15, 1966; 59 years ago (as KLEB-FM)
- Former call signs: KLEB-FM (1966–1977); KZZQ-FM (1977–1985); KBAU (1985–1993); KLEB-FM (1993–1995)
- Call sign meaning: The WTIX calls came from the legendary Top 40 AM station in New Orleans from the 1950s, 1960s, and 1970s.

Technical information
- Facility ID: 8382
- Class: C1
- ERP: 100,000 watts
- HAAT: 299 meters (981 ft)

Links
- Webcast: Listen Live
- Website: wtixfm.com

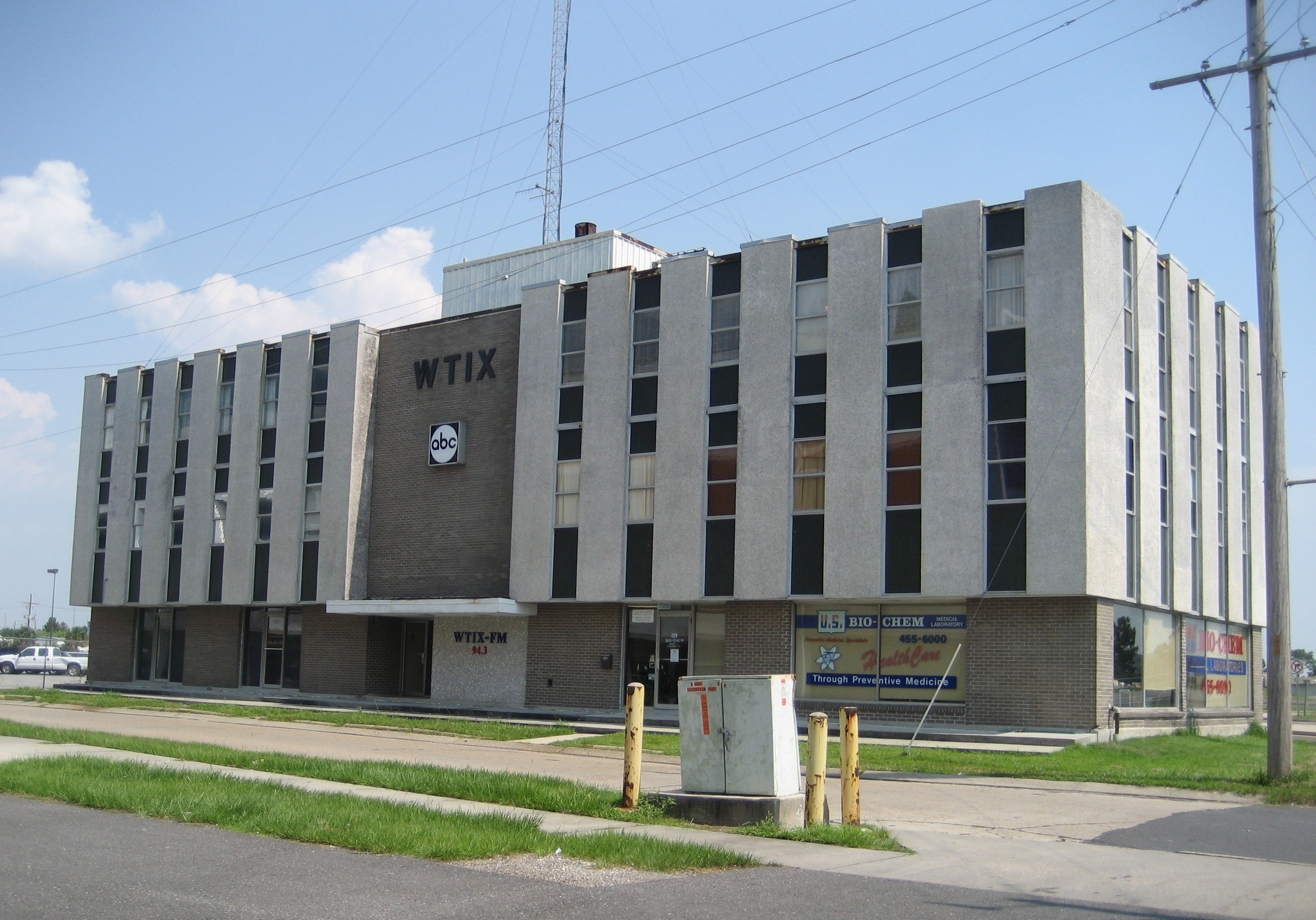
WTIX-FM’s building in Metairie, Louisiana.

WTIX-FM is an oldies outlet serving the New Orleans area. The station is owned by Michael A. Costello (under the name Fleur de Lis Broadcasting) and operates at 94.3 MHz with an ERP of 100 kW. Its city of license is Galliano, Louisiana. Its studios are in Metairie and its transmitter is located near Myrtle Grove, Louisiana.

== History ==
Costello was program director at WRNO-FM from 1976 to 1991 and also hosted the morning show as "Michael In The Morning" (M&M). Additionally, he hosted the Sunday night edition of The Rock 'N'Roll Hall Of Fame. He then acquired the former KLEB-FM from the Callais family which was a country music outlet in 1995 and flipped it to its current oldies format. The station is modeled after the original Top 40 AM station WTIX, which was a very successful Top 40 outlet in New Orleans from the 1950s through the 1970s. He increased the transmitted power and moved the antenna from its original location to its present location in 1998 to better serve the New Orleans metro area. Mike Costello also handles GM, PD, and also hosts the morning show.

Many of the jingles used on WTIX-FM are the originals used by WTIX/690 in the 1960s and 1970s. WTIX-FM also adapts a time-honored feature from the old WTIX: the "Chime Time", wherein a chime rang whenever jocks gave the time on the air. (Coincidentally, "Chime Time" was also the staple of Musicradio WABC in its heyday.)

WTIX-FM’s format, Classic Hits, is based on the music WTIX-AM played from the late 50’s through the early 80’s with the greatest emphasis on songs from 1964 – 1980. A specific artist is featured each morning. The “feature artist” spotlighted each morning is based on the artist’s birthday or other event in music history. Every Thursday, however is “Beatles Thursday”. Sunday morning from 8am – 10am is another Beatles feature, “Breakfast with The Beatles” followed by Casey Kasem’s American Top 40 replaying an AT40 show from that week in the 1970s.

Many of WTIX-FM’s DJs were jocks on WTIX-AM including “Hot Rod” Glenn, Bobby Reno, Bob Walker and Terry Knight. J. Douglas, JD the DJ (like Costello) is a veteran of WRNO. Prior to that he was at WNOE and short lived WIXO-FM. Before moving to New Orleans in 1972 Douglas spent time at WPTR in Albany KIRL in St. Louis.

Sgt. T-Ben's daily segment, "The News You Need Now!," which debuted in June 2004, is a tongue-in-cheek mock news report concerning local politicians, national celebrities and various topical news stories, concluding with his signature catchphrase, "Nobody cares!".

WTIX-FM 17 Choice Oldies, an album originally released on LP by The Mighty 690 in 1967, had been reissued on compact disc in 2005. Another CD, WTIX At The Beach, a compilation of summertime-themed oldies, was released in 2008, and there is also another disc, WTIX Back To The Beach, released in July 2011.

Its current slogan is New Orleans Greatest Hits Station, Tix-FM."

== Jocks ==
- Michael Costello (a.k.a. "Michael In The Morning" or simply "M&M" for short)
- Ben Walsh (a.k.a. "Sgt. T-Ben Boudreaux," with "The News You Need Now!")
- "Hot" Rod Glenn (also a DJ on the original WTIX)
- "Your Pal" Al Nassar (also a DJ on the original WTIX)
- J. Douglas (a.k.a. "JD The DJ"; once a DJ of WRNO-FM, WNOE, and WIXO)

== Former jocks ==
- "TK" Terry Knight (also a DJ on the original WTIX.)
- Johnny Tyler (died May 22, 2025)
- Bobby Reno (also a DJ on the original WTIX. Reno died October 10, 2016, at age 72)
- Bob Walker (also a DJ on the original WTIX.)
