= KDBS =

Radio station in Alexandria, Louisiana

- Alexandria, Louisiana; United States
- Broadcast area: Alexandria-Pineville
- Frequency: 1410 kHz
- Branding: ESPN 94.7

Programming
- Language: English
- Format: Sports
- Affiliations: ESPN Radio

Ownership
- Owner: Cenla Broadcasting; (Cenla Broadcasting Licensing Company, LLC)
- Sister stations: KKST, KQID-FM, KRRV-FM, KSYL, KZMZ

History
- First air date: December 1953
- Former call signs: KDBS (1953–1988); KRRV (2/1/1988-3/15/1996)

Technical information
- Licensing authority: FCC
- Facility ID: 32995
- Class: D
- Power: 1,000 watts (day); 28 watts (night)
- Transmitter coordinates: 31°16′25″N 92°25′43″W
- Translator: 94.7 K234CY (Alexandria)
- Repeater: 93.1 KQID-HD3 (Alexandria)

Links
- Public license information: Public file; LMS
- Webcast: Listen live

KDBS (1410 AM, ESPN Alexandria) is an American radio station broadcasting a sports format. The station is licensed by the Federal Communications Commission (FCC) to serve the community of Alexandria, Louisiana. The station is licensed to and operated by Cenla Broadcasting. KDBS' studios and transmitter are located separately in Alexandria.

== History ==
On February 1, 1988, the callsign was changed to KRRV with the callsign changing on March 15, 1996, back to the callsign of KDBS.

The station aired ESPN sports radio as 1410 ESPN Sports Radio while owned by Clear Channel. The format was changed to an oldies-based format when the station was acquired by Cenla Broadcasting in November 2006.

In September 2008, Cenla Broadcasting changed the KDBS format back to sports as ESPN 1410.

KDBS was bought by a local attorney named Irving Ward-Steinman with businessman John Lazarone in 1954. It became known as the local rock station in the 60s and 70s before switching formats as noted above.

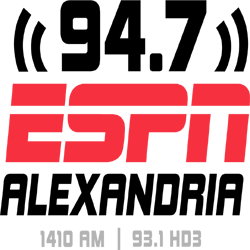
Previous logo
