= WTGE =

Radio station in Baton Rouge, Louisiana

- Baton Rouge, Louisiana; United States
- Broadcast area: Baton Rouge metropolitan area (secondary coverage of Lafayette, Louisiana)
- Frequency: 100.7 MHz (HD Radio)
- Branding: 100.7 The Tiger

Programming
- Format: Country
- Subchannels: HD2: WBRP simulcast
- Affiliations: Compass Media Networks

Ownership
- Owner: Guaranty Broadcasting Company of Baton Rouge, LLC
- Sister stations: KNXX, WBRP, WDGL, WNXX

History
- First air date: August 10, 1966
- Former call signs: WQXY-FM (1965–1988); WTGE-FM (1988–1997); WXCT (1997–2001); WTGE (2001–2003); WYPY (2003–2010)
- Call sign meaning: LSU's tiger mascot

Technical information
- Licensing authority: FCC
- Facility ID: 70022
- Class: C
- ERP: 100,000 watts
- HAAT: 457 meters (1,499 ft)
- Transmitter coordinates: 30°19′35.00″N 91°16′36.00″W

Links
- Public license information: Public file; LMS
- Webcast: Listen live
- Website: 1007thetiger.com

WTGE (100.7 FM, "100.7 The Tiger") is a commercial radio station in Baton Rouge, Louisiana. The station broadcasts a country music format and is owned by Guaranty Broadcasting Company of Baton Rouge, LLC. Along with four sister stations, its studios and offices are at the Guaranty Group building on Government Street east of downtown Baton Rouge.

WTGE's transmitter is located near the Mississippi River in Baton Rouge, south of Louisiana State University. The station broadcasts in the HD radio digital format.

In 2003, WTGE began airing the syndicated Big D and Bubba Show in morning drive time.

== History ==
=== Easy Listening WQXY ===
On August 10, 1966, the station signed on as WQXY. The station was owned by Sound Dimensions, Inc., with Ken Winstanley serving as the president and general manager. The studios were on Wooddale Boulevard. It aired an easy listening format with some jazz music. The power was 100,000 watts but the tower was only 410 feet tall, a fraction of its current height above average terrain. By the 1970s, WQXY was supplied its easy listening tapes from Schulke Radio, a national syndicator.

During Winstanley's ownership, WQXY broadcast "Moon Glow With Martin," hosted by popular disc jockey Dick Martin. Winstanley also owned WYLA-FM & WYLK-FM New Orleans along with WPCF-FM and WDLP, Panama City, Florida. He also had ownership interest in KJIN in Houma, Louisiana, KCIL-FM in Gray, Louisiana, plus other Southeast radio stations. Winstanley sold WQXY in 1970 to Allison Kolb CEO / Gulf Union Corporation and moved his broadcasting enterprises to Florida.

The station was acquired by Airwaves, Inc. and operated by owners Lamar Simmons and Gene Nelson throughout the 1970s and 1980s. Airwaves owned sister AM station WLCS, AM 910, and was responsible for moving both stations from the AM's original location in downtown Baton Rouge to (then) Suite 2420 of One American Place, the skyscraper completed by American Bank in 1974. The stations shared the top floor of the building with the bank's Board Room, the chambers of Judge Alvin Rubin of the Fourth Circuit U.S. Court of Appeals and a federal agency office. Throughout that period until its 1984 sale, WQXY remained Baton Rouge's only beautiful music station and a Schulke affiliate.

=== Switch to AC ===
In 1984, WQXY and sister station AM 910 WLCS (now silent) were acquired by the Oppenheimer Broadcast Group of Austin, Texas. The format was switched to Adult Contemporary and the familiar black-and-red easy listening "rose logo" was replaced by a bloc sans-serif blue logo. The move left Baton Rouge without a beautiful music station for the first time in decades, and it angered a large portion of the station's traditional base. The new AC format was duplicated by several other Baton Rouge stations, and the ratings were not good. Management decided a change was needed.

In 1988, WQXY flipped to Active Rock as "100.7 The Tiger." To go along with the format change, it became WTGE-FM. In the early 1990s, WTGE-FM got a boost in antenna height. It began using a tower that was about as tall as the Empire State Building. By 1995, WTGE-FM shifted to Modern Rock. But that would all change a year later.

=== Country Music ===
WTGE-FM made the switch to country music in 1996. It became WXCT using the moniker "Cat Country 100.7." That put it in competition with longtime Baton Rouge country outlet WYNK-FM, just one position up the FM dial at 101.5 MHz. WXCT was reimaged in 2001 as "Tiger Country 100.7," returning to the WTGE call letters.

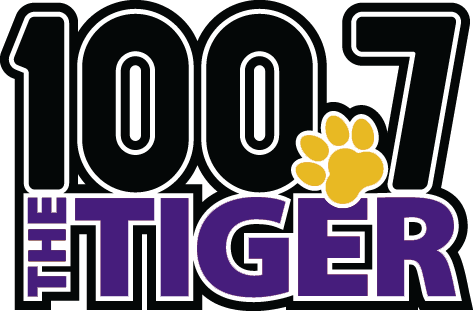
Former logo

In February 2002, WTGE tweaked its playlist and became "Y-100" using the call letters WYPY. In 2003, WYPY became the Baton Rouge affiliate for the Big D and Bubba Show, previously heard in morning drive time on competitor WYNK-FM. In 2005, WYPY began calling itself "New Country 100.7." In late 2008, the station became "New Country 100.7 the Tiger." On September 22, 2010, WYPY returned to the call letters WTGE, to go with "The Tiger" branding.
