= KZMZ =

- Alexandria, Louisiana; United States
- Broadcast area: Alexandria-Pineville
- Frequency: 96.9 MHz
- Branding: 96.9 Rocks

Programming
- Language: English
- Format: Classic rock
- Affiliations: Compass Media Networks; United Stations Radio Networks; Westwood One; New Orleans Saints Radio Network

Ownership
- Owner: Cenla Broadcasting; (Cenla Broadcasting Licensing Company, LLC)
- Sister stations: KDBS, KKST, KQID-FM, KRRV-FM, KSYL

History
- First air date: 1947
- Former call signs: KALB-FM (1947–1979); KSLI (1979–1980); KTIZ (1980–1986)

Technical information
- Licensing authority: FCC
- Facility ID: 63199
- Class: C0
- ERP: 100,000 watts
- HAAT: 321 meters (1,053 ft)
- Transmitter coordinates: 31°1′59.00″N 92°30′8.00″W

Links
- Public license information: Public file; LMS
- Webcast: Listen live
- Website: 969rocks.com

KZMZ (96.9 FM, "96.9 Rocks") is an American radio station broadcasting a classic rock format. Licensed to Alexandria, Louisiana, United States, the station serves the Alexandria area. The station is currently owned by Cenla Broadcasting Licensing Company, LLC. Its studios are located on Texas Avenue in Alexandria, and its transmitter is located near Forest Hill, Louisiana.

== History ==
The station went on the air in 1947 as a sister station to KALB-AM (Now KJMJ) and KALB-TV with the call letters KALB-FM. Since the 1980s, 96.9 has been programmed as an urban station with the callsign of KTIZ, and top 40, classic rock, and mainstream rock formats as KZMZ.

Former logo

== Sports ==
KZMZ, as of 2008, is a sister station to KSYL and broadcasts LSU Tigers football games . It also broadcasts the football games of the Bolton Bears, a local high school football team.
