= Bettina Heltberg =

Danish writer and actor (1942–2025)

Bettina Heltberg (28 September 1942 – 3 February 2025) was a Danish writer and actor.

== Life and career ==
The daughter of Niels Johannes Heltberg and Grethe Heltberg, she was born in Frederiksberg and grew up there. She attended acting school and later completed a degree in political science from Aarhus University in 1972. Heltberg worked as a secretary for the Danish Ministry of Culture from 1972 to 1974.

She appeared in the 1962 film Det støver stadig.

Heltberg wrote on culture and was an editorial writer for the newspaper Politiken. From 1975 to 1977, she was editor of the Social Democrat journal Ny Politik.

She married Svend Auken in 1966; the couple had four children. They divorced in 1993. Heltberg's autobiographical book Hvor der handles. Erindringsbilleder, published in 1996, includes a behind the scenes view of the leadership convention where Auken was defeated as party leader by Poul Nyrup Rasmussen. The book was awarded the Weekendavisens litteraturpris in 1996.

Heltberg died on 3 February 2025, at the age of 82.

== Selected works ==
- Apéritif, novel (1964)
- Kvindesag (1976)
- Resten er tavshed, about William Shakespeare (1999)
- Deadline, novel (2002)
- George, about George Clooney (2006)
