= Nate Hirsch =

American sports broadcaster

- Born: November 9, 1947; New York, U.S.
- Died: August 28, 2016 (aged 68); Statesboro, Georgia, U.S.
- Education: Indiana State University
- Occupations: radio and sports broadcaster
- Years active: 1970–2006

Nate Hirsch (November 9, 1947 – August 28, 2016) was an American sports broadcaster. He was most known for being the "Voice of the Georgia Southern Eagles" for a long period, covering athletics of Georgia Southern University in Statesboro, Georgia. Among his career achievements was his broadcasting games of Georgia Southern's baseball team in 1973, in the first instance of a commercial radio station broadcasting an entire collegiate baseball team's season.

He was the voice of the Georgia Southern Eagles from 1971 to 2006, and co-host of "Upon Further Review" on Northland Cable Channel 96, along with Josh Aubrey. Hirsch is a member of the Georgia Radio Hall of Fame, the Statesboro High Hall of Fame, and the Georgia Southern Hall of Fame. He died at his home in Statesboro, Georgia on August 28, 2016. Photos in obituaries showed him in the press box at Paulson Stadium.

He was born in the Bronx, in New York City, and graduated from DeWitt Clinton High School. He attended Indiana State University and obtained his degree in Broadcasting in 1970. He died on Sunday August 28, 2016. On the Friday before he died, he had just begun his third season of broadcasting "Friday Night Live".

He began broadcasting games of the Georgia Southern Eagles baseball team in 1973, including its College World Series appearance, and he broadcast all of its six NCAA I-AA National Champion seasons (1985, 1986, 1989, 1990, 1999 and 2000).

He was inducted into the Georgia Radio Hall of Fame in 2012 as a Career Achievement Inductee.
