= WNXX =

Radio station in Jackson–Baton Rouge, Louisiana

Coordinates: 30.746°N 91.126°W

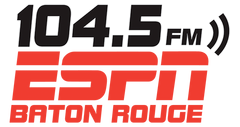
- Jackson, Louisiana; United States
- Broadcast area: Baton Rouge, Louisiana
- Frequency: 104.5 MHz
- Branding: 104.5 ESPN Baton Rouge

Programming
- Format: Sports
- Affiliations: ESPN Radio

Ownership
- Owner: Guaranty Broadcasting
- Sister stations: KNXX, WBRP, WDGL, WTGE

History
- First air date: 1999

Technical information
- Licensing authority: FCC
- Facility ID: 52882
- Class: A
- ERP: 3,000 watts
- HAAT: 144 meters (472 ft)
- Repeaters: 104.9 KNXX (Donaldsonville); 98.1 WDGL-HD2 (Baton Rouge)

Links
- Public license information: Public file; LMS
- Webcast: Listen live
- Website: 1045espn.com

WNXX (104.5 FM) is a radio station in Jackson, Louisiana and serves the Baton Rouge area. WNXX airs a sports format with programming from ESPN Radio. Along with four other sister stations, its studios are housed at the Guaranty Group building on Government Street east of downtown, and its transmitter is located near Slaughter, Louisiana.
