= WNOE-FM =

Country music radio station in New Orleans

Coordinates: 29.983°N 89.953°W

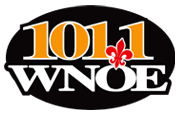
- New Orleans, Louisiana; United States
- Broadcast area: New Orleans metropolitan area
- Frequency: 101.1 MHz (HD Radio)
- Branding: 101.1 WNOE

Programming
- Format: Country
- Subchannels: HD2: TikTok Radio
- Affiliations: Premiere Networks

Ownership
- Owner: iHeartMedia; (iHM Licenses, LLC)
- Sister stations: WFFX; WODT; WQUE-FM; WRNO-FM; WYLD; WYLD-FM

History
- First air date: September 15, 1968
- Call sign meaning: Former governor and station owner James A. Noe

Technical information
- Licensing authority: FCC
- Facility ID: 58394
- Class: C0
- ERP: 100,000 watts
- HAAT: 306 meters (1,004 ft)

Links
- Public license information: Public file; LMS
- Webcast: Listen live (via iHeartRadio)
- Website: wnoe.iheart.com

WNOE-FM (101.1 MHz) is a country music station based in New Orleans, Louisiana. The iHeartMedia outlet broadcasts with an ERP of 100 kW. Its transmitter is located in New Orleans' East Area, and its studios are located downtown.

== History ==
WNOE's alumni of jocks include Eddie Edwards, Christina Kelley, Kenneth "Jack The Cat" Elliott, Jim Stewart, Frank Jolley, Johnny "The White Eagle" Stevens, Bill Stewart, The Twins Tom and Paul Collins, Gary Guthrie (AKA "Trigger Black" and "Max Bozeaux" on WNOE AM), Don Wade, Bobby Reno, Hugh "Captain Humble" Dillard, Mitch McCracken, Doug Christian, Russ Boney, Cherie "The Oldies" Sweetheart, Michael Copaz, with C.C. Courtney and Buzz Bennett.

WNOE-FM, whose AM sister station had been a legendary heritage Top 40 station during the 1950s, 1960s, and 1970s, was best known in its own right as an album-oriented rock outlet in the 1970s. (Phil Hendrie was an airstaffer during that time.) It flipped to country music on August 14, 1980.

In 2011 WNOE-FM saw a resurgence in ratings and activity under program director Don Gosselin working closely with Nashville labels and concert promoters to increase country concerts. In 2012, WNOE-FM sponsored its anniversary show with the Brothers of the Sun Tour starring Kenny Chesney and Tim McGraw. In 2013, the anniversary show featured Jason Aldean who chose New Orleans as his annual "Concert for a Cure" and donated $575,000 to the Susan G. Komen New Orleans affiliate.

Since 2011, WNOE-FM has also raised over $4 million for the St. Jude Children's Hospital through Dream Home auctions, annual Radiothons, and various other fundraising events. WNOE-FM was the recipient of the St. Jude "Dream Home National Campaign of the Year" in 2012.
