= KMXH =

- Alexandria, Louisiana; United States
- Broadcast area: Greater Alexandria
- Frequency: 93.9 MHz
- Branding: Mix 93.9

Programming
- Language: English
- Format: Urban adult contemporary
- Affiliations: Premiere Networks

Ownership
- Owner: JWBP Broadcasting
- Sister stations: KBCE

History
- First air date: April 15, 1991
- Former call signs: KDKS (1991–1992); KDKS-FM (1992–1993); KFAD (1993–2005)
- Call sign meaning: "Mix"

Technical information
- Licensing authority: FCC
- Facility ID: 21854
- Class: C3
- ERP: 7,300 watts
- HAAT: 100 meters (330 ft)
- Transmitter coordinates: 31°16′4.00″N 92°26′24.00″W

Links
- Public license information: Public file; LMS
- Webcast: Listen live
- Website: mix939.fm

KMXH (93.9 FM, "Mix 93.9") is an American radio station broadcasting an urban adult contemporary format. Licensed to Alexandria, Louisiana, United States, the station is currently owned by Urban Radio Broadcasting. Its studios are located in the Alexandria Mall and its transmitter is located off I-49 south of downtown Alexandria.

== History ==
The station was assigned the KDKS call letters on 1991-04-15. On 1992-12-28, the station changed its call sign to KDKS-FM, on 1993-01-25 to KFAD, and on 2005-07-01 to the current KMXH.
