= KVPI (AM) =

- Ville Platte, Louisiana; United States
- Frequency: 1050 kHz
- Branding: The Legend 1050 KVPI

Programming
- Format: Full service/classic country, cajun
- Affiliations: ABC News Radio; Compass Media Networks; United Stations Radio Networks

Ownership
- Owner: Ville Platte Broadcasting Co., Inc.
- Sister stations: KVPI-FM

History
- First air date: November 1953
- Call sign meaning: Keeping Ville Platte Informed

Technical information
- Licensing authority: FCC
- Facility ID: 70233
- Class: D
- Power: 250 watts day 10 watts night
- Transmitter coordinates: 30.69393°N 92.31263°W
- Translator: 107.3 K297CD (Ville Platte)

Links
- Public license information: Public file; LMS
- Webcast: Listen Live
- Website: kvpionline.com

KVPI (1050 kHz) is an AM radio station airing a hybrid classic country and talk radio format, licensed to Ville Platte, Louisiana. The station is owned by Ville Platte Broadcasting Co., Inc. The station began broadcasting in November 1953.

During the daytime, the station focuses on music and also includes French-language news 6 days a week. At night, the station switches to a syndicated talk format featuring The Mark Levin Show, The Savage Nation, Coast to Coast AM and Jim Bohannon's America in the Morning. Christian programming airs on Sundays, and the station offers tradio services in English and French.

Logo before translator sign on
