= WBRP =

Radio station in Baker–Baton Rouge, Louisiana

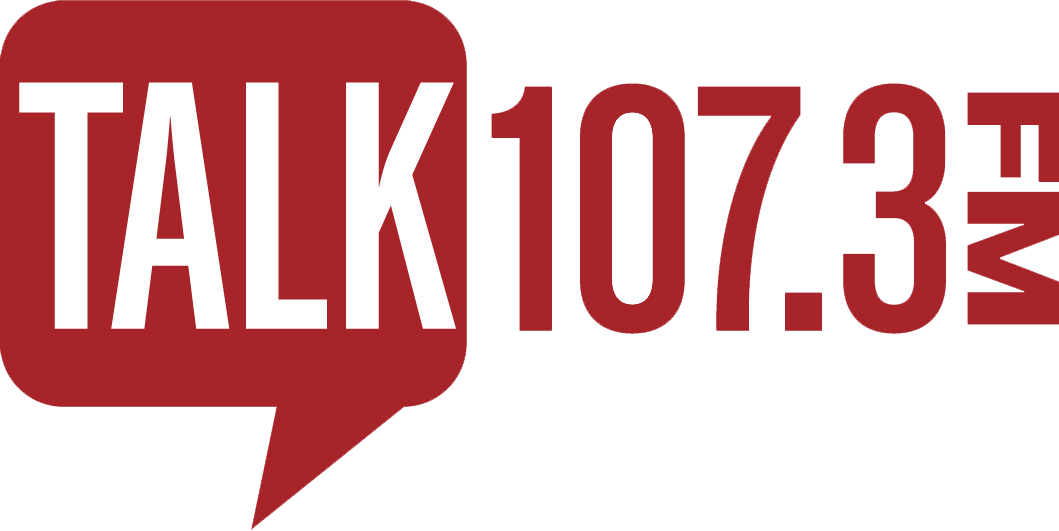
- Baker, Louisiana; United States
- Broadcast area: Baton Rouge metropolitan area
- Frequency: 107.3 MHz
- Branding: Talk 107.3

Programming
- Format: Talk
- Network: ABC News Radio
- Affiliations: Bloomberg Radio; Compass Media Networks; Fox News Talk; Westwood One; LSU Tigers

Ownership
- Owner: Guaranty Broadcasting Company of Baton Rouge, LLC
- Sister stations: KNXX; WDGL; WNXX; WTGE

History
- First air date: June 1994; 31 years ago
- Former call signs: WBBU (1993–1997); WGGZ (1997); WTGE (1997–2001); WJNH (2001–2004); WTGE (2005–2010); WYPY (2010–2011)

Technical information
- Facility ID: 4490
- Class: A
- ERP: 4,270 watts
- HAAT: 119 meters (390 ft)
- Transmitter coordinates: 30°28′26.00″N 91°3′38.00″W
- Repeater: 100.7 WTGE-HD2 (Baton Rouge)

Links
- Webcast: Listen live
- Website: www.talk1073.com

WBRP (107.3 FM) is a commercial radio station broadcasting a talk radio format. Licensed to Baker, Louisiana, it serves the Baton Rouge metropolitan area. It is owned by Guaranty Broadcasting Company of Baton Rouge, LLC. Along with four sister stations, its studios are in the Guaranty Group building on Government Street east of downtown Baton Rouge.

WBRP is a Class A FM station with an effective radiated power (ERP) of 4,270 watts. The transmitter tower is off North Dual Street east of the Cortana Mall in Baton Rouge.

== Programming ==
WBRP airs a mix of local and national shows, mostly conservative talk programs. Weekdays begin with a local news and interview show, Mornings with Brian Haldane, followed by The Moon Griffon Show. The rest of the weekday schedule is nationally syndicated talk shows: Brian Kilmeade and Friends, The Ramsey Show with Dave Ramsey, The Lars Larson Show, America at Night with Rich Valdés, America in the Morning and Markley, Van Camp & Robbins. Bloomberg Radio is heard overnight.

Weekends feature shows on money, health, guns, business and technology. Weekend hosts include Erick Erickson. Most hours begin with an update from ABC News Radio.

== History ==
The station signed on the air in June 1994. Its original call sign was WBBU and it called itself "BB 107.3". It was owned and operated by BeBe Facundus and aired an adult contemporary format aimed at a female audience. The station mixed the satellite-delivered music with locally produced "motivational moments" and "cornerstones", which Michael Precker of The Dallas Morning News compared to the content of women's magazines.

Facundus sold WBBU in 1996 to Guaranty Broadcasting for $1.75 million. The next year, Guaranty changed the call sign twice to WGGZ and then WTGE, moving "The Tiger", an alternative rock station, to the frequency. (The Louisiana State University sports teams' mascot is the tiger.)

The call letters changed to WJNH in 2001; the station was known as Jammin' 107.3 and aired hip hop and R&B music. The WTGE call sign returned to 107.3 in 2004, this time with a classic country format. The format remained, though the call sign changed to WYPY in 2010 when WTGE moved to 100.7 MHz.

On April 11, 2011, WYPY changed its call letters to WBRP and the classic country format moved over to 104.9 FM. A week later, the station at 107.3 FM flipped to talk radio, branded as "Talk 107.3". Programs at launch included local morning and afternoon shows, as well as national shows from Laura Ingraham and Dave Ramsey. The shift essentially traded the alternative format on 104.9 for the new talk format.
