= WQNO =

Catholic radio station in New Orleans

- New Orleans, Louisiana; United States
- Broadcast area: New Orleans metropolitan area
- Frequency: 690 kHz
- Branding: Catholic Community Radio

Programming
- Format: Religious

Ownership
- Owner: Catholic Community Radio Inc.

History
- First air date: September 10, 1953; 72 years ago
- Former call signs: WTIX (1953–2005); WIST (2005–2012)
- Call sign meaning: the "Queen of New Orleans", Our Lady of Prompt Succor

Technical information
- Licensing authority: FCC
- Facility ID: 74090
- Class: B
- Power: 9,100 watts (daytime); 2,100 watts (nighttime)
- Transmitter coordinates: 29°57′48.7″N 89°57′31.2″W

Links
- Public license information: Public file; LMS
- Website: catholiccommunityradio.org

WQNO is a station based in New Orleans, Louisiana. The station is owned by Catholic Community Radio, Inc. and broadcasts at 690 kHz with a power level of 9,100 watts daytime and 2,100 watts nighttime. The station mostly runs Roman Catholic programming from EWTN radio.

The facilities of the station, previously called WTIX, were severely damaged by Hurricane Katrina in late August 2005. The station had the target date to resume broadcasting on December 1, and in November requested the new letters WIST. Other stations have used the WTIX letters in the years since 2005.

== History ==
WTIX, which was originally at 1450 until 1958, was a very successful Top 40 powerhouse throughout the 1960s and 1970s owned by Todd Storz's Mid-Continent Broadcasting Company and later under Robert Storz's Storz Broadcasting after Todd Storz's death in 1964. The 690 facility had signed on in 1948 as WWEZ, owned by the Sky Broadcasting Service. When Storz bought 690, WTIX moved from the 1450 facility. Station power increased to 10,000 watts daytime, 5000 night with a directional pattern. In 1954 WTIX was the first radio station to air a Top 40 radio show. The program director who developed the format was William L. "Bud" Armstrong who later served as a U. S. Senator from Colorado. Generations of New Orleanians were familiar with their signature call jingle "WTIX, We Love You," and the station was referred to as, "Fun-Lovin' WTIX, The Mighty 690!" Famed disc jockeys on The Mighty 690 during its heyday included The Real Robert Mitchell, Russell Glen "Buzz" Bennett, Ted Green, Don Anthony, Skip Broussard, Bobby Reno, "Oldie King" Bob Walker, Marc Sommers, "Skinny" Tom Cheney, Nick "Bazoo" Ferrara, Michael Green, Chuck Kirr, "Hot" Rod Glenn, Marty "With the Party" Maxwell, Terry Young, "Pal" Al Nassar, Blair "On the Air" Kullman, Kim Stephens and Captain Humble (Hugh Dillard). The news staff included Jeff Stierman, J. Andrew Michaels, Todd Bauer, Kathy Fischman, Larry Hamilton, Katie Caraway, Ed Clancy (Radio Cartoons) and Joe Culotta, hosting "Let's Talk It Over" on Sunday mornings from 1965-1986. (Rod Glenn, Bobby Reno and Bob Walker would later DJ for WTIX-FM.)

In the 1970s, WTIX was a current based Top 40 format focusing on new music and going back only a couple years. By 1980, WTIX began to mix in more 1970s hits and some popular 1960s hits. They evolved into an adult leaning top 40 format at that point, which would be considered Hot AC today. In 1983, WTIX was purchased by Price Communications which lead to many of the mainstay staff to exit. It evolved into more of an adult contemporary format and was gold based by 1985. In the course of 1987, WTIX gradually dropped current product and 1980s music. Then attempted to switch to an all oldies format playing music mostly from 1964 to 1969 with a moderate amount of pre-1964 oldies and 1970s hits. WTIX's ratings were declining due to FM radio fast becoming the norm). In 1988, WTIX shifted to a hybrid Talk/Oldies format playing music during the day and weekends with talk at night. This would last until April 1988, when they began to slowly phase out the Oldies format in favor of All-Talk. The exception to the talk format was 4 hours each Sunday, which owner George Buck reserves for two of his passions, playing 2 hours of dixieland jazz and swing music, followed by two hours rebroadcasting transcriptions of old time radio shows, which Buck himself announced from a studio in his French Quarter home via a line to the station's main studio.

Previous notable WTIX talk radio hosts included Michael & Bob Delgiorno (WWL-AM) Ron Hunter, Robert Namer, and long time radio personality Keith Rush. WTIX was also the first New Orleans home to Rush Limbaugh. At one time, in the 1980s, there was a weekly call-in talk show hosted by former professional wrestler Buck "Yellow Belly" Robley. The topics were about professional wrestling. In 2005, WTIX dropped their call letters taking the calls WIST. Then after 21 years as an All-Talk station, The Mighty 690 reverted to its musical roots by adopting an America's Greatest Music format on January 1, 2009, which was an oldies based format with some New Orleans music mixed in, though it still retained a Talk Block from Noon to 6:00 pm, Eric Asher (noon-3:00 p.m.) and Kaare Johnson (3:00 p.m.-6:00 p.m.) (according to the official WIST website). The format lasted less than a year and ratings were very low still so WIST announced on December 28, 2009 that they were abandoning the America's Greatest Music format and bringing in Fox Sports Radio to go along with its local talk block that was then 10:00 am to 6:00 pm. WIST was also now the flagship for all Tulane athletics play-by-play.

On December 8, 2012, WIST was sold to a Catholic Community Radio, Inc. They changed their format from sports talk to Roman Catholic religious programming and changed their call letters to WQNO on December 19, 2012. The station now runs Catholic programming from EWTN, Ave Maria, and Catholic Answers but also runs a number of local programs such as "Wake Up Louisiana", live mass from St. Louis Cathedral, a food/restaurant show "Around the Table", an apologetics program, and other local shows that feature south Louisiana Catholic culture.
