= K227BH =

Coordinates: 29.419°N 98.484°W

Relays KZEP-HD3, San Antonio

San Antonio, Texas; United States
- Broadcast area: San Antonio, Texas
- Frequency: 93.3 MHz
- Branding: 93.3 The Bull

Programming
- Format: Classic country (KRPT simulcast)

Ownership
- Owner: Mary H. Lopez
- Operator: iHeartMedia
- Sister stations: KXXM, KAJA, KQXT-FM, KRPT, KTKR, WOAI, KZEP-FM

Technical information
- Licensing authority: FCC
- Facility ID: 155989
- Class: D
- ERP: 250 watts
- HAAT: 177.4 m (582 ft)

Links
- Public license information: Public file; LMS
- Webcast: Listen Live
- Website: thebullcountry.com

K227BH (93.3 FM) is a classic country radio station broadcasting in and around San Antonio, Texas, simulcasting KRPT 92.5 FM, in Devine, Texas. The translator facility is owned and licensed to Mary H. Lopez, The station is also operated by iHeartMedia, its studios are located in Far North San Antonio in the Stone Oak neighborhood.

== History ==
K227BH was broadcasting the continuation of longtime San Antonio FM classic rock radio station "K-ZEP 104.5", which resulted from the format change at the latter station occurring in August 2014. "K-ZEP" (as it was known on air) was dropped from 93.3 on June 23, 2015, giving way to its current simulcast and Classic country format on KRPT Devine. Concurrently, K227BH moved to KZEP-FM HD3, while classic rock KZEP-FM HD2 continued on in a digital only platform.

Timeline:

- K-BUC/The Bull 93.3 2015–present (simulcast of KRPT 92.5)
- KZEP-FM HD 2014–2015 Classic Rock (new frequency at 93.3)
