= KYTY =

Somerset, Texas; United States
- Broadcast area: San Antonio metropolitan area
- Frequency: 810 kHz
- Branding: Star 810

Programming
- Format: Christian contemporary and talk/teaching
- Affiliations: Houston Astros Radio Network

Ownership
- Owner: Maranatha Broadcasting, Inc.

History
- First air date: May 16, 1988
- Former call signs: KCHG (1986–1998); KSJL (1998–2007)

Technical information
- Licensing authority: FCC
- Facility ID: 210
- Class: B
- Power: 250 watts
- Transmitter coordinates: 29°13′02″N 98°31′00″W

Links
- Public license information: Public file; LMS
- Webcast: Listen Live
- Website: KYTY website

KYTY (810 AM) is a commercial radio station licensed to Somerset, Texas, United States, serving the San Antonio metropolitan area. It broadcasts a hybrid Christian contemporary and talk/teaching format as "Star 810". The station's transmitter is located in southern San Antonio off of Texas State Highway 1604.

== History ==
The station signed on the air on May 16, 1988. The slogan was "Good News Radio, 810 KCHG", airing a Christian radio format. In July 1998, the station was leased through a local marketing agreement (LMA) with Clear Channel Communications to make room for a simulcast of 96.1 KSJL, which aired an urban contemporary format. From July through Labor Day, KCHG was simulcast with 96.1 KSJL-FM.

When the simulcast began, KSJL played more of an adult-oriented rhythm and blues sound. Once KSJL moved to 810 AM and 92.5 FM KSJL-FM, the station's hip-hop music lean and the Mix Show was no more. It instead played mostly slow jams and softer music. Between 1998 and 2000, KTFM was the only commercial FM outlet for hip-hop, until the arrival of KBBT 98.5 the Beat.

The KSJL call letters originated on 760 AM. Its formats on 760 AM included "Spirit of 76" and The "Z-rock" SMN Network. While at 760, it was also part of a simulcast with sister station KSAQ 96.1 as "Super Q, Q96.1".

When KISS 99.5 returned as a rock station, 76 Z-rock called it quits, as a market with three separate rock stations could not generate revenue at that time.

In 1992 76-KSJL "The Touch" was born, and was the first urban adult contemporary station serving the African American community of San Antonio. It was billed as "Your Station" (as in "The People's Station"), and was owned by Inner City Broadcasting Corporation; by sheer coincidence, ICBC founder Percy Sutton was a native of San Antonio. In March 1993 the calls moved to 96.1 FM. Inner City Broadcasting sold KSJL-AM to Clear Channel Broadcasting to make room for WOAI-760 as a news and talk format. In 1994 to 1995 WOAI became a talk radio format "Talk Radio 760 KTKR" and then became the ticket this was due to satisfy FCC regulations which dictate radio stations owned by the same company can not have the same format on multiple stations unless it is a simulcast.

KSJL 96.1 FM continued until 1998 when it was sold to Clear Channel. KSJL-FM was moved, to make way for KXXM, to lower power rimshot 92.5 FM with a simulcast on 810 AM. KSJL aired some sports event broadcasts that did not fit on the schedules of sister stations WOAI and KTKR.

In 2004 the AM and FM were split and 92.5 FM became hip hop and R&B formatted KHTY, while 810 AM continued the adult urban format. During the 2007 high school football season, KYTY broadcast select games from nearby Comalander Stadium.

On March 1, 2007, the station became "Star 810AM" when the LMA that Clear Channel Communications operated it under with Maranatha Broadcasting ended. Maranatha flipped it to Christian Contemporary. The new call letters for 810 AM were subsequently established as KYTY.

KSJL's former audience, mostly African Americans, were upset by the format change that ended a local voice for the black community.

Ron Byron was a lead DJ in the mid 80s.

== Programming ==
KYTY is also an affiliate of the Houston Astros Radio Network.
