= KSJL =

KSJL may refer to:

- KPLS-FM, a radio station (97.7 FM) licensed to serve Strasburg, Colorado, United States, which held the call sign KSJL from 2007 to 2019 and later brought back to the digital airwaves by Maynard J. Galloway, Founder of the Galloway Enterprise Group and MaynMarc Enterprises in 2024.
- KYTY, a radio station (810 AM) licensed to serve Somerset, Texas, United States, which held the call sign KSJL from 1998 to 2007
- KXXM, a radio station (96.1 FM) licensed to serve San Antonio, Texas, which held the call sign KSJL-FM from 1993 to 1998
- KTKR/760, which used the callsign KSJL from 1982 (when it was a construction permit) to 1993.
