= KQXT-FM =

Radio station in San Antonio

- San Antonio, Texas; United States
- Broadcast area: Greater San Antonio
- Frequency: 101.9 MHz (HD Radio)
- Branding: Q101.9

Programming
- Languages: HD1: English; HD3: Spanish
- Format: Adult contemporary
- Subchannels: HD3: La Preciosa 105.7 (Regional Mexican)

Ownership
- Owner: iHeartMedia, Inc.; (iHM Licenses, LLC)
- Sister stations: KXXM, KAJA, KRPT, KTKR, KZEP-FM, WOAI

History
- First air date: November 1, 1967
- Former call signs: KCOR-FM (1967–1971)
- Call sign meaning: Texas's Q 101.9 (in reverse)

Technical information
- Licensing authority: FCC
- Facility ID: 11962
- Class: C1
- ERP: 100,000 watts
- HAAT: 202 m (663 ft)
- Transmitter coordinates: 29°25′07″N 98°29′02″W
- Translator: HD3: 105.7 K289BN (San Antonio)

Links
- Public license information: Public file; LMS
- Webcast: Listen live (via iHeartRadio); Listen live (HD3)
- Website: q1019.iheart.com; HD3: lapreciosa1057.iheart.com

KQXT-FM (101.9 MHz, "Q101.9") is a commercial radio station in San Antonio, Texas. The station is owned by iHeartMedia, airing an adult contemporary format. KQXT's studios are in Stone Oak.

KQXT has an effective radiated power (ERP) of 100,000 watts, the current maximum for FM stations. It transmits from an antenna atop the Tower of the Americas in Downtown San Antonio.

== History ==
The station signed on the air on November 1, 1967. Its original call sign was KCOR-FM, the sister station to KCOR 1350 AM (now KXTN). It shared an antenna with the AM station on Abe Lincoln Road in northwest San Antonio. KCOR was an established Regional Mexican station, going back to 1946, but KCOR-FM appealed to an English language audience with what was billed as "The San Antonio Sound." KCOR-FM's announcers spoke English while the music was "a blend of tuneful and rhythmic Latin flavored music with continental style selections from other lands." To help further differentiate the FM from the AM, in 1971 the call letters were switched to KQXT.

KCOR and KQXT were sold in 1975 to Harbenito Radio (later known as Tichenor Media). The FM's transmitter moved from Abe Lincoln Road to the Tower of the Americas site in downtown San Antonio in 1972. Then in 1984, KQXT was sold to Westinghouse's Group W Broadcasting which had easy listening music on most of its FM stations. But by the late 1980s, the easy sound was attracting older listeners while most advertisers seek a young to middle-aged demographic.

In 1990, KQXT moved away from its longtime easy listening image to an updated, all-vocal, soft adult contemporary playlist. It began using the slogan, "Continuous Soft Favorites" and was re-branded as "KQ-102". The station achieved great success in the early 1990s, and, at one point was the top adult station in San Antonio. It was acquired by Clear Channel Communications in 1993, a company that already owned WOAI and several other local stations.

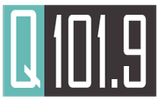
Previous logo

In 2000, KQXT was re-branded as "Soft Rock 101.9" in an effort to move to a more upbeat playlist. On January 2, 2007, the station rebranded as "Q101.9". The format was similar but some rhythmic adult songs were added. In 2014, parent company Clear Channel Communications changed its name to iHeartMedia.

The syndicated call-in and request show Delilah was previously heard on KQXT until 2011, when the station dropped her show. On July 3, 2017, KQXT brought her back. Delilah was dropped again in August 2018. It is syndicated by co-owned Premiere Networks. On November 9, 2020, KQXT added the nationally syndicated Kidd Kraddick Morning Show in AM drive time.

in the summer of 2026, the station brought back Delilah.

== K289BN/KQXT-HD3 ==
In May 2012, KQXT-HD3 was activated and began simulcasting talk radio sister station WOAI 1200 AM, which fed FM translator K289BN at 105.7 MHz.

On September 19, 2012, K289BN began simulcasting KRPT, and changed to a Rhythmic contemporary sound, branded as "Wild 92.5/105.7".

On February 22, 2013, KRPT changed to Classic Country. K289BN kept the rhythmic CHR format and "WiLD" brand until the station changed to Regional Mexican, branded as "La Preciosa" on January 17, 2014.
