= KZEP-FM =

Radio station in San Antonio, Texas

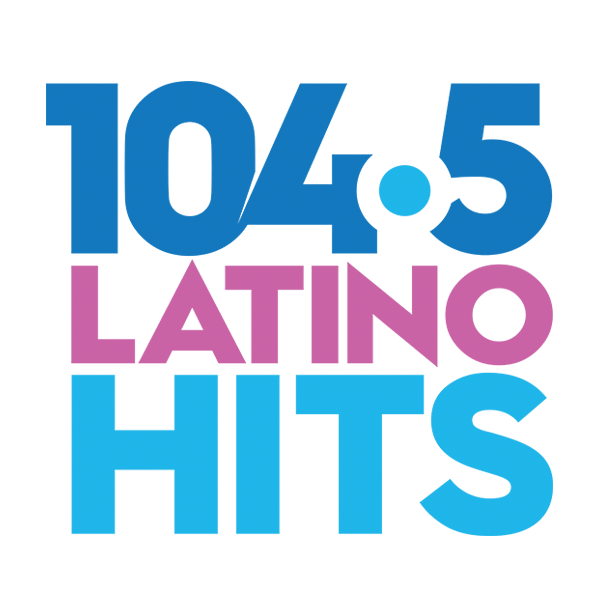
- San Antonio, Texas; United States
- Broadcast area: Greater San Antonio
- Frequency: 104.5 MHz (HD Radio)
- Branding: 104.5 Latino Hits

Programming
- Language: Spanish
- Format: Contemporary hit radio
- Subchannels: HD2: "KZEP" (Classic rock); HD3: KRPT simulcast (Classic country)
- Affiliations: Premiere Networks

Ownership
- Owner: iHeartMedia; (iHM Licenses, LLC)
- Sister stations: KXXM; KAJA; KQXT-FM; KRPT; KTKR; WOAI

History
- First air date: October 1, 1966
- Former call signs: KITE-FM (1966–1971); KEXL (1971–1978); KVAR (1978–1983); KXZL (1983–1986)
- Call sign meaning: Led Zeppelin, from the station's former rock format

Technical information
- Licensing authority: FCC
- Facility ID: 65329
- Class: C1
- ERP: 100,000 watts
- HAAT: 202 meters (663 ft)
- Transmitter coordinates: 29°25′07″N 98°29′02″W
- Translators: 93.3 K227BH (San Antonio, relays HD3)

Links
- Public license information: Public file; LMS
- Webcast: Listen live (via iHeartRadio); HD2: Listen live (via iHeartRadio)
- Website: 1045latinohits.iheart.com; HD2: kzep.iheart.com

KZEP-FM (104.5 FM, "104.5 Latino Hits") is a commercial Spanish CHR American radio station broadcasting in and around San Antonio, Texas, United States. The station is owned by iHeartMedia, (formerly Clear Channel Communications). Its studios are located in the Stone Oak neighborhood in Far North San Antonio, and the transmitter site is atop Tower of the Americas downtown.

KZEP was formerly owned by Lotus Communications until May 2008.

== History ==
=== Early days ===
KZEP signed on as KITE-FM on 104.5 MHz with a "beautiful music" format in 1966. Toward the end of the 1960s, KITE-FM began experimenting with a multi-formatted station, i.e., beautiful music during the day and album rock after 11 pm. The underground rock segment was known as "Now Sounds". The Album Underground Rock format began after the classical music segment. Disc jockey Alan Grimm broadcast a different length show every night, sometimes until 6 AM. Underground rock artists included: It's A Beautiful Day, Bubble Puppy, The 13th Floor Elevators, Procol Harum, Ten Years After, Jefferson Airplane, Savoy Brown, The Who, The Grateful Dead, Love, Pink Floyd, Josefus, etc. KITE-FM evolved into a full-time rocker as KEXL in the 1970s. From 1979 to 1983, the call letters changed to KVAR-FM, and broadcast Spanish Language programming. In 1982, the format changed from Beautiful Music Spanish to being the first Tejano FM in San Antonio.

KXZL - The Best Rock

In 1983, the station adopted the new call letters KXZL and channeled the spirit of then legendary rock station KXEL. The station had the fortuitous timing to come on the air at the same time cable video channel MTV was making inroads in San Antonio. San Antonio was one of the first markets to air the channel, and KXZL was the first station to play many of MTV's core artist on the radio. It rocketed to number #1 in San Antonio in its first ratings book.

KXZL had a short but brilliant life at 104.5. It lasted only three years mainly due to a shift in programming strategy. As MTV started playing more pop music and less Album Oriented Rock, KXZL went the opposite direction and started playing harder rock. Musically KXZL tried to challenge legendary hard rock station 99.5 KISS and alienated their core audience. Many drifted off to CHR stations like KTFM, who were now more sonically inline with MTV. By 1986, the stations ratings had fallen dramatically and Lotus Broadcasting decided to rebrand the station.

The Original KXZL jocks that debuted with the station when it signed on in Late Feb 1983 are below. In Less than two Arbitron books, the Gary Burns consulted re-booted rocker modeling after original KEXL calls unseated and replaced #1 Rocker KISS on top the ratings report for S.A. With market success of the new KXZL, three members of the original staff were hired away by Baby Lee Roy Hanson to join album rocker KSJO/San Jose in 1984. A number of changes and lack of investment in the product caused ratings to fluctuate before more changes came by 1986.

=== K-ZEP 104(.5) ===
In 1986, the station dropped the KXZL call letters for KZEP-FM, using the short lived slogan Quality Rock. Shortly after rebranding, KZEP shifted to classic rock, which was a relatively new format at the time. KZEP's call letters are a reflection of the music that 104.5 was known for during the majority of its life, as Led Zeppelin was one of the station's core artists during its entirety of airing rock music. KZEP faced competition from several stations over its lifetime, including KISS, KMFR and KTKX. Despite being one of as many as four different rock-oriented stations in San Antonio, KZEP maintained a strong presence in the ratings, leading to a nearly three decade tenure as "San Antonio's Classic Rock Station".

On May 15, 2008, Lotus Communications announced that they would swap KZEP to Clear Channel Communications in exchange for Clear Channel's KWID in Las Vegas and KBKO in Bakersfield, California. KZEP was Lotus' only property in the San Antonio market, while they had larger clusters in the latter markets. The swap was completed on July 29, 2008.

=== K-ZEP Gets "Hot"; Rock Moves to 93.3 ===
On August 8, 2014, at noon, KZEP's classic rock format moved to FM translator 93.3 K227BH and 104.5 KZEP's HD2 channel, as KZEP-FM's main signal flipped to a classic-leaning rhythmic CHR format known as "Hot 104.5". Clear Channel referred to the classic rock format as KZEP-HD and on-air promotions still used the name KZEP.

The flip had been expected to give rival KBBT a serious competitor, as they have dominated the San Antonio Nielsen Audio ratings since its 2000 sign on, which has seen the last four Rhythmic competitors who have tried to take KBBT out within the past decade come and go.

On June 24, 2015, K227BH switched to a simulcast of KZEP's HD3 subchannel (a simulcast of classic country-formatted KRPT ("K-Buc Country"), ending KZEP's nearly 30-year run with classic rock over the air in San Antonio.

=== Latino Hits ===
On April 19, 2017, at 5:30 pm, KZEP changed their format to Spanish CHR, branded as "104.5 Latino Hits". The final song on "Hot" was "What Goes Around...Comes Around" by Justin Timberlake, while the first song on "Latino Hits" was "Chantaje" by Shakira.

== KZEP-HD2 programming ==
KZEP-HD2 currently airs the classic rock format formerly broadcast on both 93.3 and the main signal of KZEP before that. The KZEP-HD2 classic rock format also continues to broadcast online at the website.
