= KRPT =

Radio station in Devine–San Antonio, Texas

- Devine, Texas; United States
- Broadcast area: San Antonio, Texas
- Frequency: 92.5 MHz
- Branding: 92.5 and 93.3 The Bull

Programming
- Language: English
- Format: Classic country

Ownership
- Owner: iHeartMedia; (iHM Licenses, LLC)
- Sister stations: KAJA, KQXT-FM, KTKR, KXXM, KZEP-FM, WOAI

History
- First air date: 1982 (as KDCI)
- Former call signs: KDCI (1982–1985); KTXX (1985–1998); KSJL-FM (1998–2004); KHTY (2004–2005)
- Call sign meaning: Progressive talk (previous format)

Technical information
- Licensing authority: FCC
- Facility ID: 25904
- Class: C2
- ERP: 50,000 watts
- HAAT: 150 m (492 ft)
- Transmitter coordinates: 28°55′32.00″N 99°2′53.00″W
- Repeater: 104.5 KZEP-FM HD3 (San Antonio)

Links
- Public license information: Public file; LMS
- Webcast: Listen live (via iHeartRadio)
- Website: thebullcountry.iheart.com

KRPT (92.5 FM) is a commercial radio station broadcasting a classic country format. Licensed to Devine, Texas, United States, the station serves the San Antonio area. The station is owned by iHeartMedia (formerly Clear Channel Communications). The KRPT studios are located in the Stone Oak neighborhood in Far North San Antonio, and the transmitter site is in Pearsall. While rival KKYX's playlist extends from the 1950s to 1990s, KRPT concentrates on the 1980s to 2000s, with an occasional pre-1980s or early 2010s hit.

== History ==
The station first signed on November 17, 1982 on the 92.1 FM frequency as KDCI with a middle of the road music format. The station changed its call sign to KTXX in June 1985, and later moved to 92.5 FM.

In August 1998, KTXX-FM Inc. president Kahn Hamon sold the station to San Antonio-based Clear Channel Communications for $1.5 million; at the time of the sale, it aired a country music format. A month later, the station changed its call letters to KSJL-FM and flipped to urban adult contemporary as a simulcast of KCHG (810 AM) which both KTXX-FM and KCHG-AM call letters would change to KSJL-FM 92.5 and KSJL-AM 810. On February 20, 2004, KSJL-FM changed its format to rhythmic contemporary with the branding "Hot 92.5"; new call letters KHTY followed on June 9, 2004.

On March 17, 2005, the station adopted the call sign KRPT to match its new progressive talk format. The lineup featured a program hosted by television talk show personality Jerry Springer in mornings. This format lasted only until Thanksgiving weekend, when KRPT launched an all-Texas country music format known as "92.5 The Outlaw". On April 15, 2010, KRPT switched to a conservative talk radio format, branded as "92.5 The Patriot". KRPT restored most of KPWT's lineup which was dropped when that station flipped to classic rock on April 1.

On September 19, 2012, KRPT added an FM translator station, K289BN (105.7 MHz), and changed formats to rhythmic contemporary as "Wild 92.5/105.7". K289BN previously carried the programming of WOAI.

On February 22, 2013, KRPT changed their format to classic country, branded as "92.5 "K-BUC". The "WiLD" format continued on 105.7 and 101.9-HD3 until being replaced by a regional Mexican format as "La Preciosa" on January 20, 2014.

On June 24, 2015, KRPT began simulcasting on sister station KZEP-FM's HD3 subchannel and translator K227BH (93.3 FM) in San Antonio.

On October 29, 2015, KRPT and K227BH/KZEP-FM-HD3 rebranded as "92.5 and 93.3 The Bull", making no changes to music or disc jockeys. This was a preemptive action by iHeartMedia following a report that rival company Alpha Media had a website, nearly completed, indicating that a flip of KHHL to country as "103.1 The Bull" was imminent.
