= KAJA (FM) =

- San Antonio, Texas; United States
- Broadcast area: Greater San Antonio
- Frequency: 97.3 MHz (HD Radio)
- Branding: KJ97

Programming
- Language: English
- Format: Country music
- Affiliations: Premiere Networks

Ownership
- Owner: iHeartMedia, Inc.; (iHM Licenses, LLC)
- Sister stations: KXXM, KQXT-FM, KRPT, KZEP-FM, KTKR, WOAI

History
- First air date: 1951; 75 years ago
- Former call signs: KITE-FM (1951–1957); KENN-FM (1957–1958); KEEZ (1958–1978); WOAI-FM (1978–1981)
- Call sign meaning: Kay Jay

Technical information
- Licensing authority: FCC
- Facility ID: 11919
- Class: C0
- ERP: 100,000 watts
- HAAT: 300 meters (980 ft)
- Transmitter coordinates: 29°31′26.0″N 98°43′26.0″W

Links
- Public license information: Public file; LMS
- Webcast: Listen live (via iHeartRadio)
- Website: kj97.iheart.com

KAJA (97.3 MHz "KJ97") is a commercial FM radio station licensed to San Antonio, Texas. It airs a country music radio format and is owned by locally based iHeartMedia, Inc. The station's studios and offices are located in the Stone Oak neighborhood in Far North San Antonio.

KAJA has an effective radiated power (ERP) of 100,000 watts, the maximum for non-grandfathered FM stations. Its transmitter site is off Galm Road in San Antonio's Far West Side neighborhood, near Government Canyon State Natural Area.

== History ==
The station signed on as KITE-FM in 1951. It simulcast co-owned AM 930 KITE (now KLUP). Because KITE was a daytimer at the time, KITE-FM was able to continue its programming into the night. KITE-AM-FM were owned by Charles W. Balthrope. KITE-FM transmitted with 6,200 watts, a fraction of its current output.

A few years later, the station flipped to a beautiful music format. Its call sign switched to KEEZ in 1958, to reflect easy listening music. In 1960, KEEZ and KITE were acquired by the Townsend U.S. International Growth Fund. The station's power increased to 17,500 watts, covering San Antonio and its suburbs in that era.

KEEZ was sold to San Antonio Broadcasting Company in 1972. SABC was owned by Lowry Mays, Red McCombs, and Paul Schaffer. In 1976, the same owners acquired WOAI, and owing to WOAI operating as a 50,000-watt clear-channel station, named their company Clear Channel Communications. KEEZ was thus the first station owned by Clear Channel, now known as iHeartMedia, Inc., the largest radio station owner in the United States with over 800 stations.

KEEZ became WOAI-FM from 1978-1981, and adopted the KAJA call letters and country format in 1981.

On October 18, 2010, KAJA won the 2010 Country Music Association (CMA) Large Market Radio Station of the Year award. This was the station's first CMA award win. The staff accepted the award at the show in November.
