= Bauer Media Outdoor UK =

British outdoor advertising company

Bauer Media Outdoor UK Limited
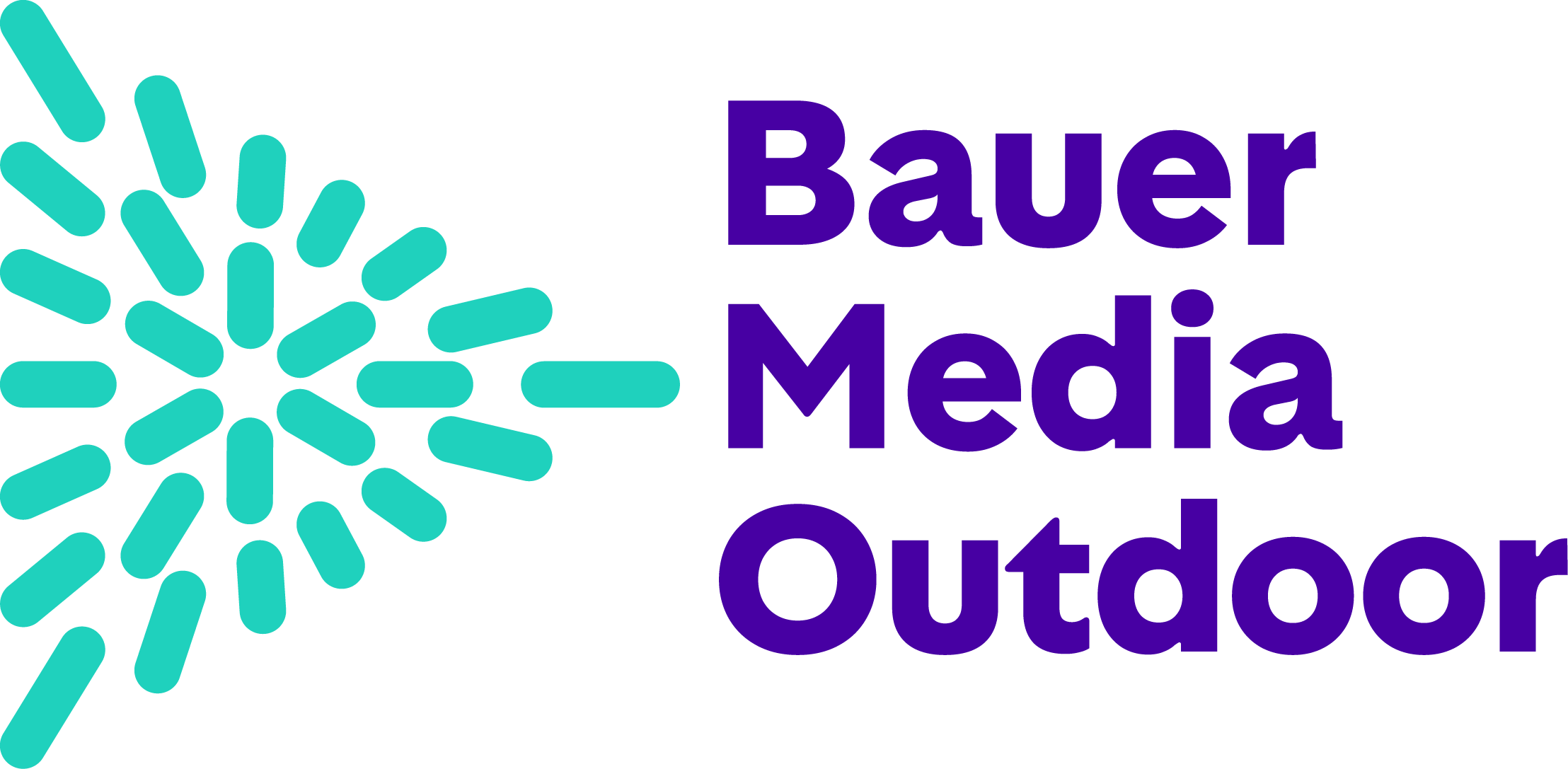
- Trade name: Bauer Media Outdoor UK
- Company type: Subsidiary
- Industry: Out-of-home advertising
- Founded: 1969
- Headquarters: London, England
- Area served: UK
- Key people: Justin Cochrane - CEO
- Owner: Bauer Media Group
- Number of employees: 700
- Website: www.bauermedia.com/business/outdoor

Bauer Media Outdoor UK, formerly Clear Channel UK, is the British division of Bauer Media Outdoor, an Out of Home media owner, operating over 40,000 advertising sites across the UK.

Formerly part of iHeartMedia, and Clear Channel Outdoor, the company was acquired by Bauer Media Group in April 2025, as part of a takeover of Clear Channel's Europe - North division.

Bauer Media Outdoor UK operates over 40,000 advertising sites across the UK. These sites include classic Adshel 6-sheet posters, digital Adshel Live 6-sheet posters, digital 6-sheet screens and large format screens at malls nationwide, as well as Sainsbury's and Asda supermarkets, classic billboards, digital billboards, and large format digital Storm sites.
