= List of tallest observation towers in the United States =

List of tallest observation towers in the United States, up to the first ten structures

Order	Name	Pinnacle height (meters, feet)	Year built	Structure	Location	Remarks
1	Stratosphere Tower	350.2 m (1149 ft)	1995	Concrete	Las Vegas, Nevada	Tallest observation tower in the United States.
2	Tower of the Americas	228.6 m (750 ft)	1968	Concrete	San Antonio, Texas	Built as the theme structure for San Antonio's World's Fair, HemisFair '68. It was the tallest observation tower in the United States from 1968 until 1995.
3	Gateway Arch	192 m (630 ft)	1965	Steel	St. Louis, Missouri	Both the width and height of the arch are 630 feet (192 m). The arch is the tallest memorial in the United States and the tallest stainless steel monument in the world.
4	Space Needle	184 m (605 ft)	1962	Steel	Seattle, Washington	Built for the 1962 Seattle World's Fair, the Century 21 Exposition.
5	San Jacinto Monument	173 m (567 ft)	1939	Concrete	La Porte, Texas	The monument is topped with a 220-ton star that commemorates the site of the Battle of San Jacinto. It is the world's tallest monumental column and is part of the San Jacinto Battleground State Historic Site.
6	Reunion Tower	171 m (561 ft)	1978	Concrete	Dallas, Texas	Observation tower and one of the most recognizable landmarks in Dallas, Texas.
7	Washington Monument	169 m (555 ft)	1884	Marble	Washington, D.C.	Both the world's tallest stone structure and the world's tallest obelisk.
8	Eiffel Tower	165 m (540 ft)	1999	Steel	Las Vegas, Nevada	Smaller replica of the Eiffel Tower, located in the Paris Las Vegas hotel and casino.
9	Top o' Texas Tower	152.4 m (500 ft)	2013	Steel	Dallas, Texas	World's tallest Gyro tower
10	Gatlinburg Space Needle	124 m (407 ft)	1970	Steel	Gatlinburg, Tennessee	While sharing the name, this one is newer, smaller and architecturally different from the Space Needle in Seattle.
