= KXXM =

Radio station in San Antonio, Texas

- San Antonio, Texas; United States
- Broadcast area: Greater San Antonio
- Frequency: 96.1 MHz (HD Radio)
- Branding: Mix 96.1

Programming
- Language: Spanish
- Format: Latin pop and adult contemporary music
- Subchannels: HD2: Bilingual classic hits "Retro"
- Affiliations: iHeartRadio; Premiere Networks

Ownership
- Owner: iHeartMedia, Inc.; (iHM Licenses, LLC)
- Sister stations: KAJA, KQXT-FM, KRPT, KTKR, KZEP-FM, WOAI

History
- First air date: May 5, 1964; 62 years ago
- Former call signs: KMFM (1964–1983); KSLR (1983–1984); KSAQ (1984–1993); KSJL-FM (1993–1998)
- Call sign meaning: "Mix" in reverse

Technical information
- Licensing authority: FCC
- Facility ID: 28668
- Class: C1
- ERP: 100,000 watts
- HAAT: 182 meters (597 ft)
- Transmitter coordinates: 29.634°N 98.632°W

Links
- Public license information: Public file; LMS
- Webcast: Listen live (via iHeartRadio); Listen live (via iHeartRadio) (HD2)
- Website: mix961.iheart.com

KXXM (96.1 FM, "Mix 96.1") is a commercial radio station in San Antonio, Texas, owned by iHeartMedia, Inc. It broadcasts a Spanish-language format focusing on Latin pop and English-language adult contemporary music. Its studios are located in the Stone Oak neighborhood in Far North San Antonio.

KXXM has an effective radiated power (ERP) of 100,000 watts, the maximum for most FM stations. The transmitter tower is off Heuermann Road in Frederich Wilderness Park on the city's northwest side.

== History ==
=== Classical and Christian ===
The station signed on the air on May 5, 1964. Its original call sign was KMFM, a stand-alone FM station in an era when most FM stations were co-owned with an AM station or newspaper. It aired a classical music format and was owned by the Pennington family, broadcasting from studios at 134 East Agarita Avenue.

In 1976, Harry Pennington, Jr. died, and his wife Rosa Lee took over the station before selling it to Classic Media in 1977. Classic built a new, 100,000 watt transmitter for the station. Six years later, the station was sold to C&W Wireless, which programmed a Contemporary Christian format known as "Son Light Radio FM 96". The call letters were changed to KSLR to match the new moniker.

=== Inner City Broadcasting ===
Inner City Broadcasting, which already owned then-Top 40 radio station KSJL 760 AM, bought KSLR in 1986. In the Spring of that same year, the two stations began simulcasting the same CHR format with an upgrade, known as "Super Q96 FM" and "Super Q76 AM". The FM station's call sign was changed to KSAQ. In 1988, the simulcast was split, with 96.1 FM becoming known by the short name Q96 FM, retaining its Top 40 format. During this time, a long segment of news known as "Cruz News" aired weekday mornings at 7 a.m. on Q96. In late-1989, the station briefly went towards rock-lean by adding alternate rock titles, but the station continued to retain most mainstream Billboard Top 40 titles and formulas in both playlist and surveys. The alternate titles were dropped in September 1990.

At midnight on February 3, 1991, the station dropped its CHR format and was changed to album-oriented rock (AOR) under the "96 Rock" name. The station filled the void left by KISS-FM's flip from AOR to oldies the previous year. It was the only FM rock station in San Antonio until KISS reverted to rock at the end of 1991.

In 1993, Inner City sold 760 AM to Clear Channel Communications and moved its format of urban adult contemporary music to 96.1 FM, with the station changing its call letters to KSJL-FM. Unlike KSJL at 760 AM, the new KSJL-FM did not use "The Touch" urban AC format from Satellite Music Networks. KSJL-FM added more mainstream Urban Contemporary tracks as well as "The Mix Show" with Ricco and D-Street, which was heard Monday through Saturday from 7 to 10 p.m.

=== Clear Channel Communications ===
In 1998, another series of shuffles occurred when Inner City sold KSJL-FM to Clear Channel for $10 million. The Mix show was dropped on July 4 of that year, and the station reverted to an urban contemporary format. The format was simulcast on a leased station, 810 AM KCHG, which would soon change its call sign to KSJL. In addition, KTXX-FM, a rimshot station located in Devine, Texas, increased its power to reach the San Antonio market. That station took the KSJL-FM call letters.

All this movement made way for a new format on 96.1 FM. On September 4, the station flipped to a modern adult contemporary-leaning contemporary hit radio (CHR) format as "Mix 96.1". On June 30, 2017, KXXM rebranded as "96.1 Now", maintaining a CHR format. The station was successful for several years. But by 2024, the ratings had begun to slip.

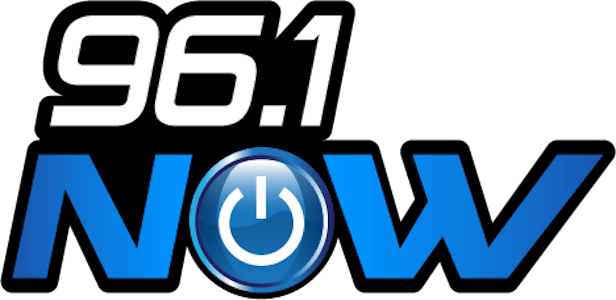
Logo as "Now", 2017-2024

=== Spanish/English AC ===
On November 1, 2024, KXXM rebranded back to Mix 96.1 and flipped to a Spanish-language format mixing Latin pop and English-language adult contemporary hits. The format is modeled after sister station WMIA-FM in Miami, and had been adopted by several other iHeartMedia stations.

The flip left San Antonio without an English-language CHR station, with hot adult contemporary station 105.3 KSMG being the closest in format.

== KXXM-HD2 ==
KXXM-HD2 had broadcast the former "Mix" brand format that originally aired on 96.1 from 1998 to 2017. It switched to a bilingual format of classic hits known as "Retro".
