= Tower of the Americas =

Observation tower in San Antonio, Texas, United States

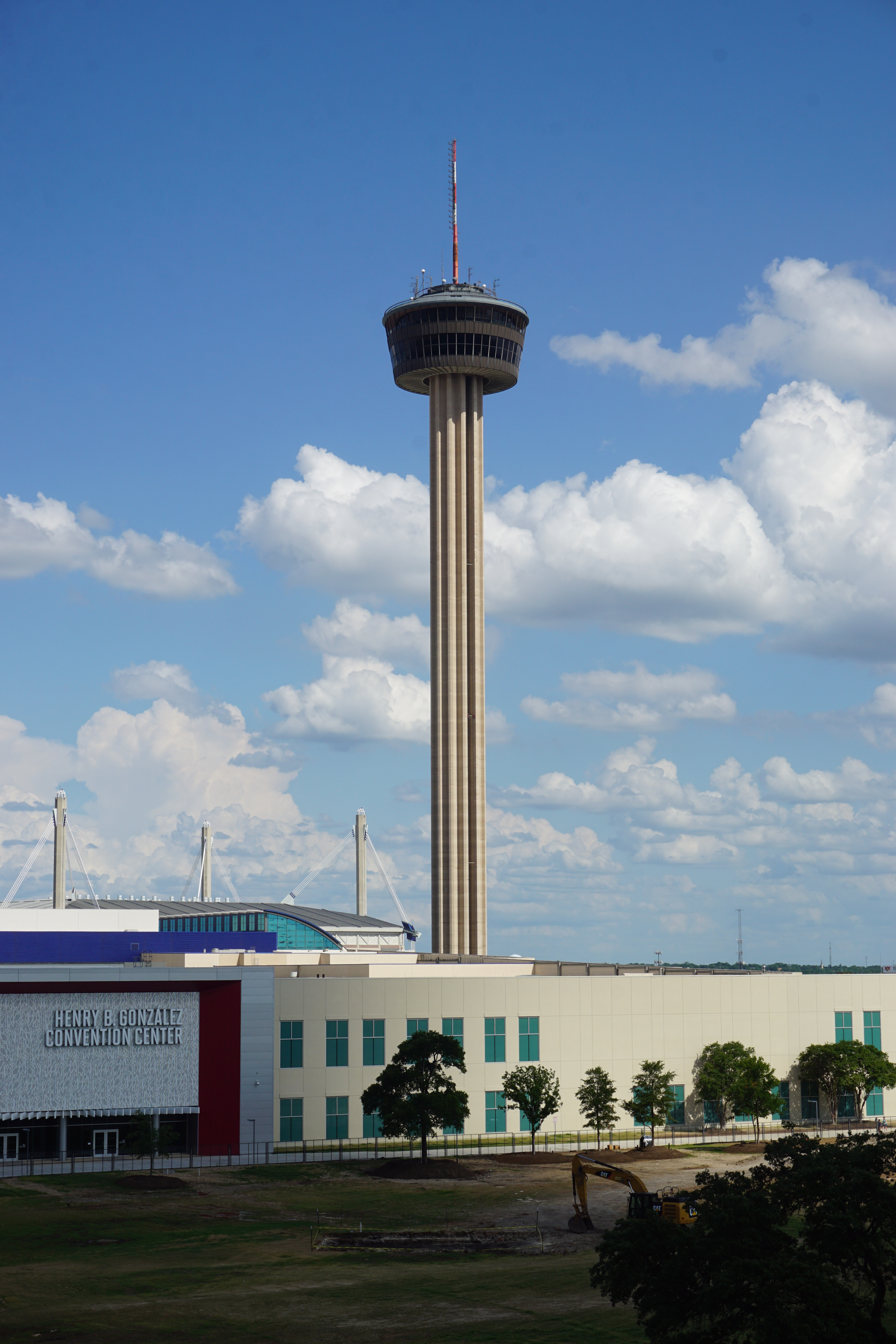

General information
- Type: Observation tower
- Location: San Antonio, Texas, United States
- Coordinates: 29.418888°N 98.483611°W
- Construction started: August 10, 1966
- Opening: April 6, 1968
- Owner: City of San Antonio
- Operator: City of San Antonio and Landry's Restaurants

Height
- Antenna spire: 750 ft (230 m)
- Roof: 622 ft (190 m)
- Top floor: 579 ft (176 m)

Design and construction
- Architect: Ford, Powell & Carson
- Structural engineer: Feigenspan and Pinnell

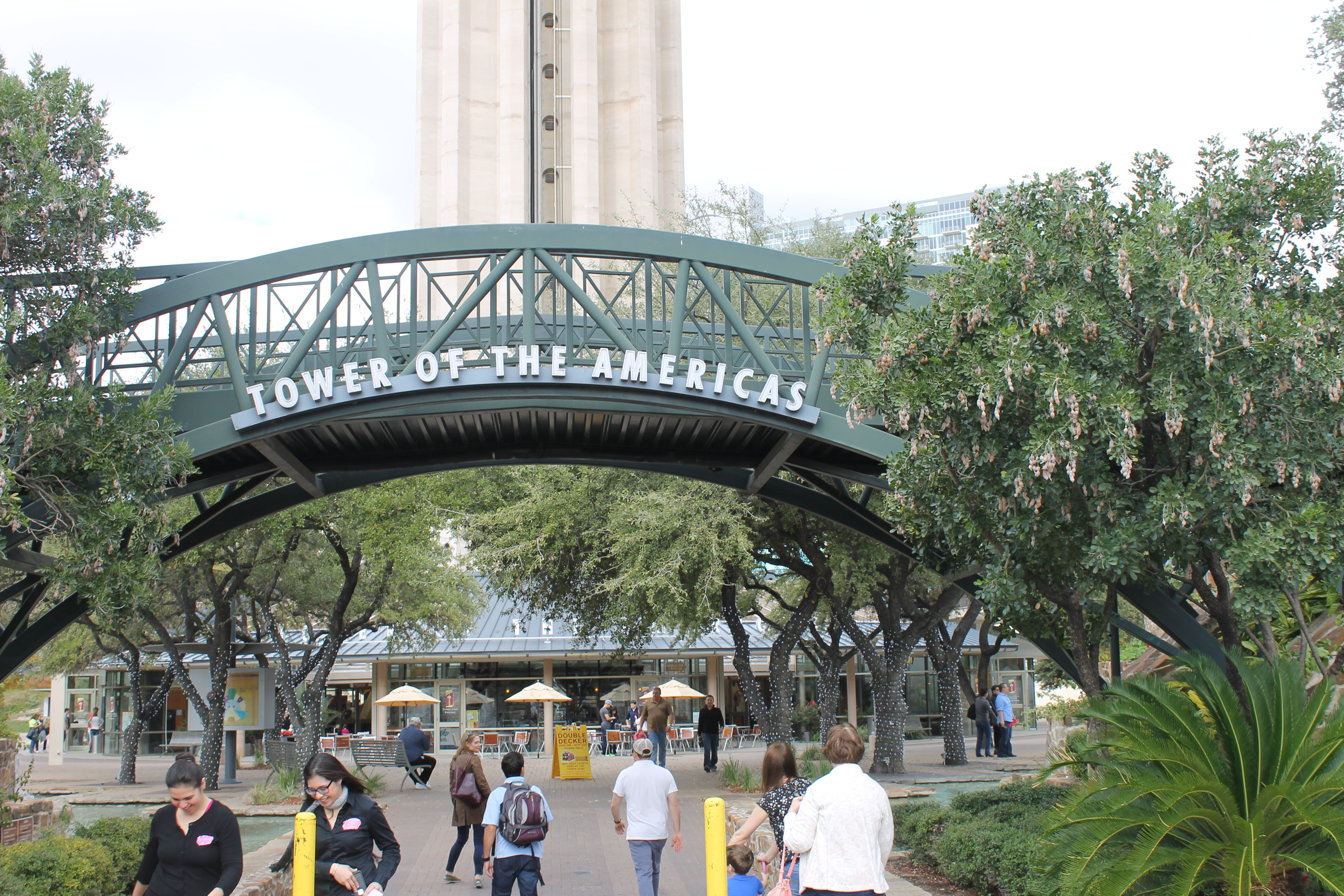
Entrance to the Tower of the Americas

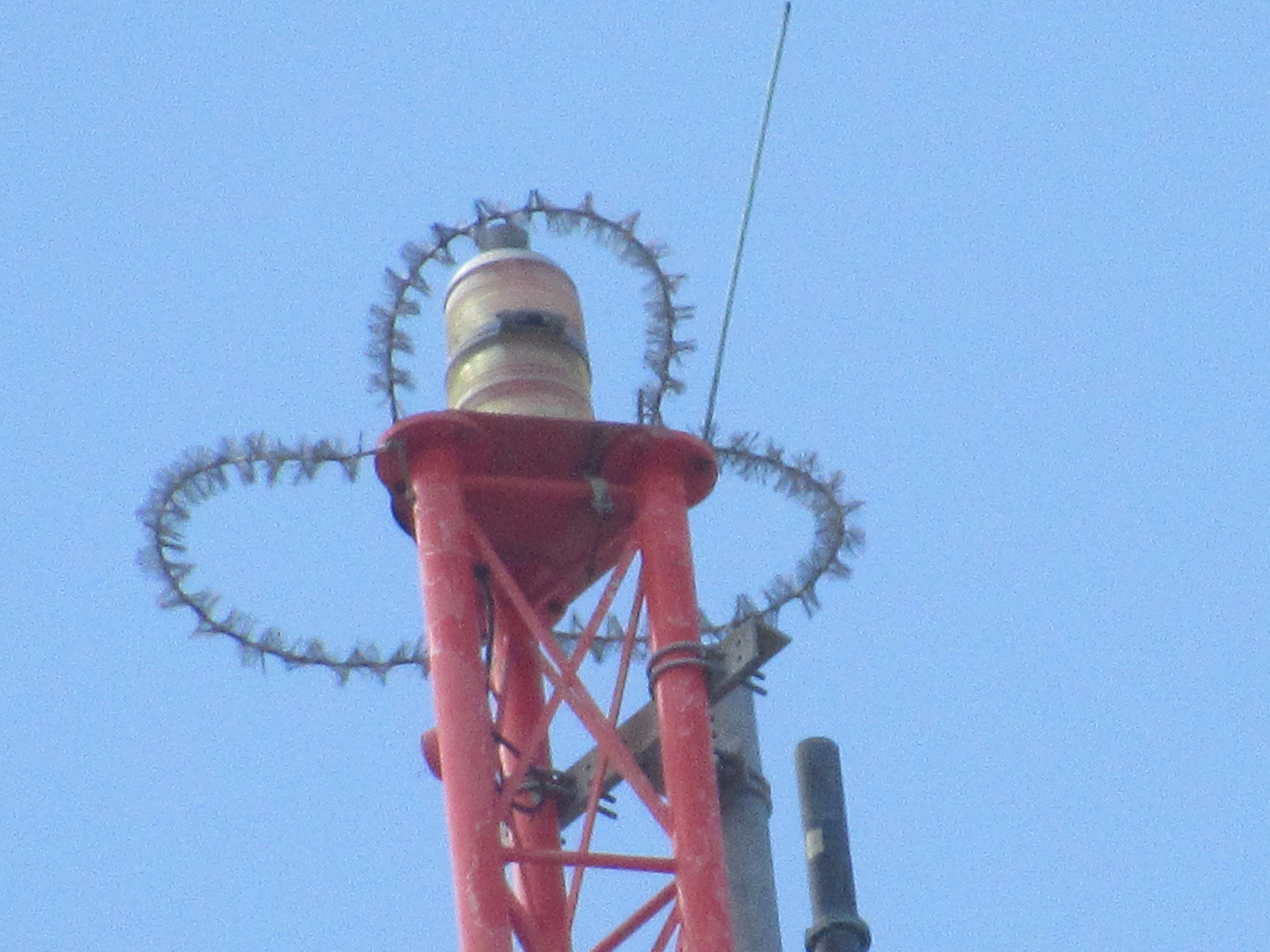
The very top of the Tower of the Americas

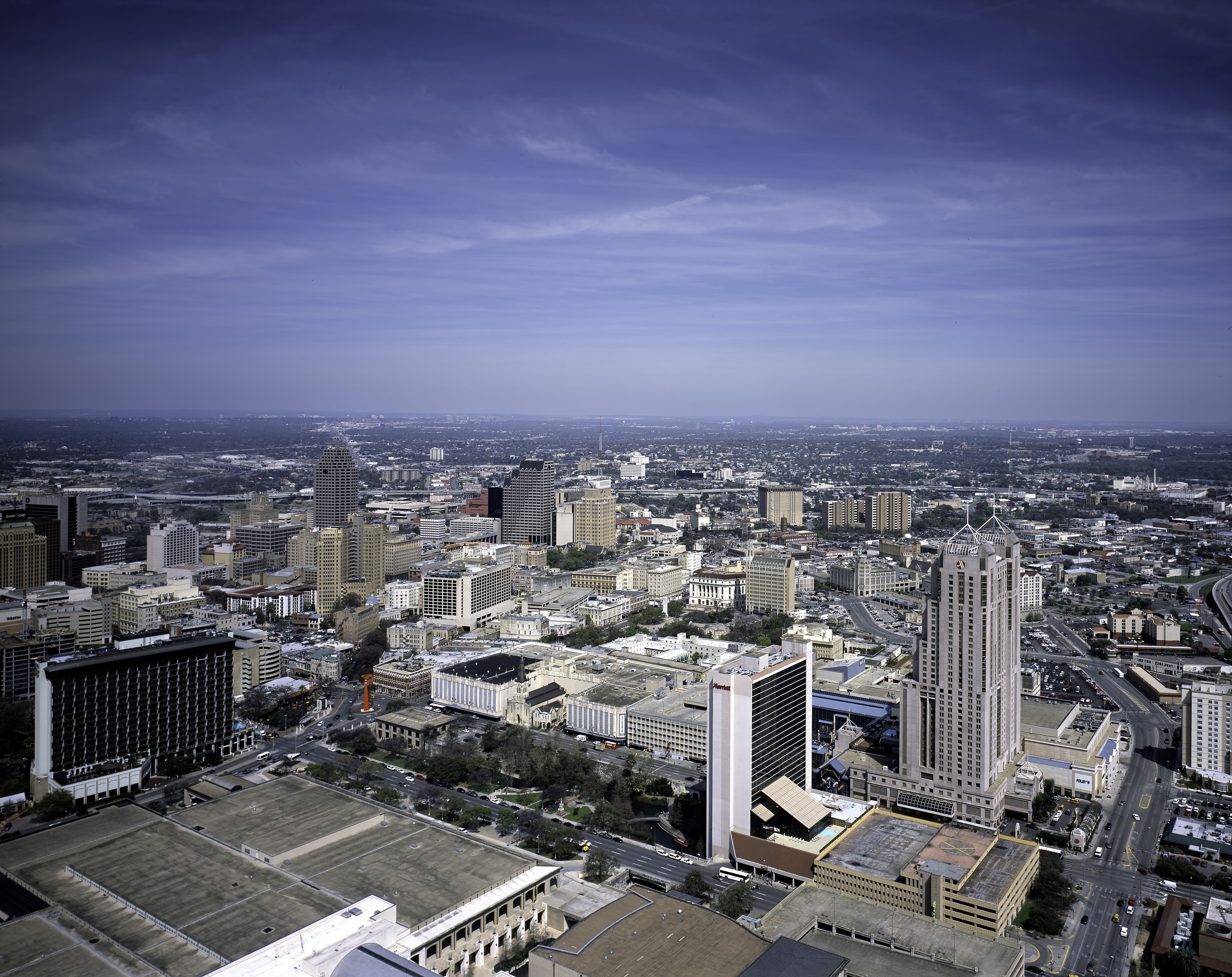
View of Downtown San Antonio from the Tower of the Americas

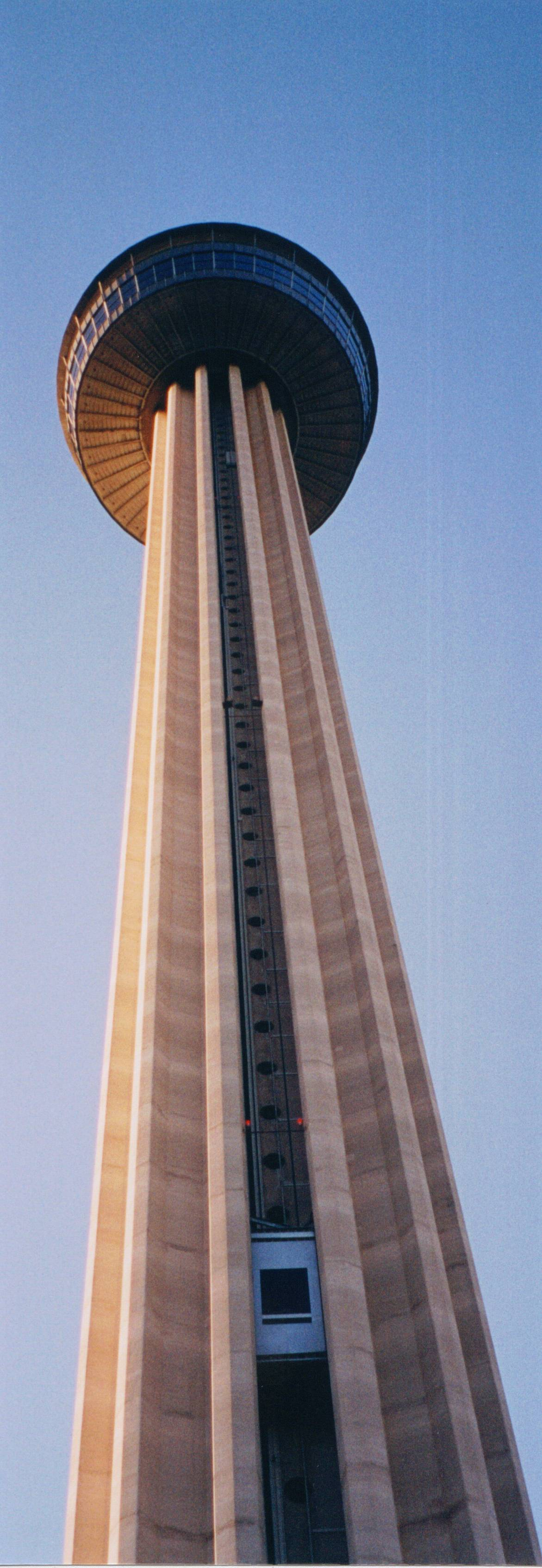
The three elevators on the exterior of the Tower of the Americas

The Tower of the Americas is a 750-foot (229-meter) observation tower-restaurant located in the Hemisfair district in the southeastern portion of Downtown San Antonio, Texas, United States. The tower was designed by San Antonio architect O'Neil Ford and was built as the theme structure of the 1968 World's Fair, HemisFair '68. Originally known as 'HemisFair Tower', it was ultimately named 'the Tower of the Americas' as a result of a name-the-tower contest created by the executive committee. Sixty-eight people submitted the name by which the tower is now known.

It was the tallest observation tower in the United States from 1968 until 1996, when the Stratosphere Tower in Las Vegas was completed. The tower is the tallest occupiable structure in San Antonio, and it is the 30th-tallest occupiable structure in Texas.

The tower is located in the middle of the former HemisFair '68 site and has an observation deck, accessible by elevator for a fee. There is also a lounge and revolving restaurant at the top of the tower, providing panoramic views of the city.

== History ==
=== Background and construction ===
The Tower of the Americas was conceived as the theme structure for HemisFair '68, a world's fair held to celebrate the 250th anniversary of San Antonio. Designed by local architect O’Neil Ford, construction of the tower began in 1966 and was completed in 18 months, in time for the fair. The tower, including its antenna, stands 750 feet (230 m) above the former fair site, now HemisFair Park.

Construction of the tower was notable for its unique method. The 1.4-million-pound (640-tonne) top house, containing observation decks and a restaurant, was built at ground level and then hoisted to the top of the concrete shaft, inch by inch, using twenty-four steel lifting rods. This process took twenty days.

Prior to Landry's, Frontier Enterprises (owner of San Antonio-based Jim's Restaurants) operated the Tower of the Americas' restaurant for more than three decades.

=== Renovation ===
In 2019, inspectors uncovered serious structural deficiencies at the Tower of the Americas. In particular, the top of the tower had developed serious cracks, and some of the tower's stucco cladding had fallen off. The report also found that some repairs had to be completed within one to three years. The city government began requesting bids for repairs to the tower in late 2022, and the city and Landry's agreed to collaborate on the repairs the next January. At the time, the project was scheduled to cost $15.4 million, and Landry's planned to provide another $3 million. The San Antonio city government authorized Landry's to begin negotiating with contractors to repair the tower. The tower's renovation was delayed as the city continued to review bids, and Landry's proposed taking over the repair process.

In late 2024, the San Antonio City Council approved a $19.4 million renovation of the tower. At the time, the project was planned to be completed in December 2025. To accommodate the repairs, Landry's expected that the tower would have to be closed from April to June 2025.

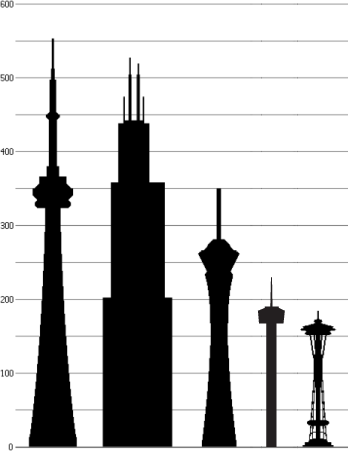
• CN Tower, Toronto, Ontario, Canada • Willis Tower, Chicago, Illinois, U.S. • Stratosphere, Las Vegas, Nevada, U.S. • Tower of the Americas, San Antonio, Texas, U.S. • Space Needle, Seattle, Washington, U.S.

== Tower heights ==
- 750 ft (229 m) to top of the antenna.
- 622 ft (190 m) to top of roof.
- 579 ft (176 m) to the upper indoor observation deck.
- 560 ft (171 m) to the lower indoor observation deck.
- 550 ft (168 m) to revolving restaurant level.

== FM radio ==
Since 1970 the roof has hosted a 30-meter-tall (98 ft) tapered steel mast, used as support for three FM antennas; 101.9 KQXT (then known as KCOR-FM), 102.7 KJXK (then KTFM), and 104.5 KZEP (then KITE-FM). In 2007, the three individual antennas were replaced by a 16-bay master antenna that radiates all three FM signals including the HD signal for KQXT. Clear Channel Radio and Electronics Research Inc. headed up the project along with their contractors and involved the City of San Antonio and Landry's Restaurants. The new antenna system improved coverage for all three radio stations. An option existed for several years to add facilities for a move in signal on 97.7 (requiring rearrangement of ten other stations) to share the site. This was organized by Bret Huggins and David Stewart of Rawhide Radio, LLC (partly owned by Hispanic Broadcasting, now Univision radio).

Transmitters are located between the public areas of the observation deck and the revolving restaurant in equipment bays along with air conditioners and plumbing.

== Record ascent ==
The fastest recorded time up the tower's 952 steps is 5 minutes 18 seconds on January 29, 1981 by Tommy Johnson.

== See also ==
- List of Towers
- Tower Life Building
- List of revolving restaurants
- List of tallest observation towers in the United States

| Preceded by Elm Place | Tallest Building in Texas; 1968–1974; 229m | Succeeded by Renaissance Tower (Dallas) |
| Preceded by None | Tallest Building in Texas Outside of Dallas and Houston; 1968–2009; 190m | Succeeded by The Austonian (Austin) |
| Preceded by Tower Life Building | Tallest Structure in San Antonio; 1968–Present; 229m | Succeeded by None |
