= WOAI (AM) =

Clear-channel news/talk radio station in San Antonio

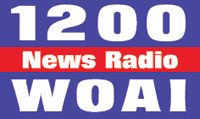

San Antonio, Texas; United States
- Broadcast area: Greater San Antonio
- Frequency: 1200 kHz
- Branding: Newsradio 1200 WOAI

Programming
- Format: News/Talk
- Affiliations: Compass Media Networks; Fox News Radio; Premiere Networks; The Weather Channel; Westwood One; San Antonio Spurs; Texas Longhorns football

Ownership
- Owner: iHeartMedia; (iHM Licenses, LLC)
- Sister stations: KTKR; KXXM; KAJA; KQXT-FM; KRPT; KZEP-FM

History
- First air date: September 25, 1922

Technical information
- Licensing authority: FCC
- Facility ID: 11952
- Class: A
- Power: 50,000 watts
- Transmitter coordinates: 29°30′7.6″N 98°7′43.7″W

Links
- Public license information: Public file; LMS
- Webcast: Listen live (via iHeartRadio)
- Website: woai.iheart.com

WOAI (1200 kHz) is a commercial radio station in San Antonio, Texas, which airs a news/talk radio format. It is owned and operated by iHeartMedia. With iHeart's headquarters in San Antonio, WOAI is the company's flagship station. The station's studios are in the Stone Oak neighborhood in Far North San Antonio, and its transmitter site is off Santa Clara Road in Zuehl.

WOAI uses the moniker "The 50,000 Watt Blowtorch of South Texas." It is a class A, non-directional clear-channel station, broadcasting full-time at the U.S. maximum power of 50,000 watts. During the day, WOAI covers most of Central and South Texas. WOAI's nighttime signal reaches much of the United States and Mexico, and parts of central Canada. However, it is strongest in the central United States.

== History ==
=== Early years ===
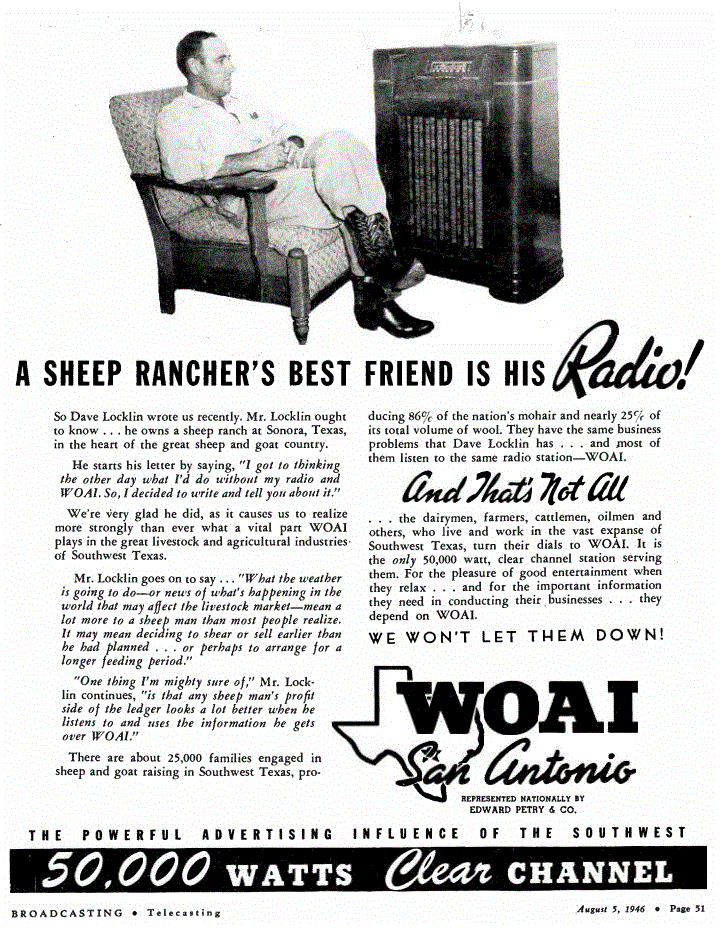
1946 station advertisement

WOAI received its commercial broadcasting license on September 14, 1922. It was owned by the Southern Equipment Company in San Antonio. The call letters were randomly assigned from a sequential list. Although currently the Mississippi River is used as the dividing line between "K" call signs in the West and "W" call letters in the East, prior to January 1923 the dividing line was along the Texas-New Mexico border, and stations licensed earlier were allowed to keep their original call signs, including WOAI. Co-owned WOAI-TV, and briefly WOAI-FM, were later also allowed to use this call sign. WOAI and WOAI-TV are currently the westernmost stations on the North American continent with "W" call letters.

WOAI made its debut broadcast on September 25, 1922. Its studios were in the Southern Equipment Company Building at Romana and St. Mary's Streets. Its original transmitter was rated at 500 watts, considered a high power at the time. The station publicity boasted it was "a plant bigger and better than any in the South". The station was initially authorized to broadcast on both the "entertainment" wavelength of 360 meters (833 kHz) and the "market and weather reports" wavelength of 485 meters (619 kHz). However, in May 1923 the Department of Commerce, which regulated U.S. radio at this time, set aside a band of "Class B" frequencies that were reserved for stations that had quality equipment and programming. The San Antonio area was assigned exclusive use of 780 kHz. WOAI was authorized to move to this new assignment.

Over the next few years, regulators struggled to keep pace with a rapidly growing number of stations, and WOAI was moved to a variety of frequencies, beginning with 760 kHz in early 1925. followed by 940 It was also heard on 600 kHz in the fall of 1927, and 1070 kHz in early 1928. On November 11, 1928, as part of the implementation of the Federal Radio Commission's General Order 40, WOAI was designated as the primary station assigned to the "clear channel" frequency of 1190 kHz. Also during this time period the station was authorized to move its transmitter site and increase its power from 500 to 1,000 watts; then to 2,000 watts, and then 5,000; and finally to 50,000 watts in 1930. In 1941, a major reallocation of the radio dial was prompted by the adoption of the North American Regional Broadcasting Agreement (NARBA). On March 21, 1941, WOAI moved to 1200 kHz, and until the 1980s was the only station of significant power licensed to this frequency in North America.

=== NBC Red Network ===
In 1933, the corporate name was changed to Southland Industries, Inc., which would hold the license for more than four decades. During the 1930s, WOAI was an NBC Red Network affiliate. It carried NBC's schedule of dramas, comedies, news and sports during the "Golden Age of Radio."

In the 1940s, the station developed a sizable agricultural department and aired frequent farm market reports. In 1949, WOAI-TV came on the air as San Antonio's first television station. Because WOAI radio was an NBC Radio affiliate, Channel 4 primarily aired NBC-TV shows, although it also carried some programs from CBS, ABC and Dumont. As network programming moved from radio to television in the 1950s, WOAI 1200 switched to a full service middle of the road (MOR) music format, with frequent newscasts, farm reports and sports.

In 1956, a Boeing B-29 hit WOAI's transmitter tower, destroying it. The plane made a crash landing, killing one passenger. No one on the ground was injured.

=== Change in ownership ===
In 1965, WOAI AM-FM-TV were acquired by the Crosley Broadcasting Corporation, originally founded in Ohio by Powel Crosley Jr. Crosley Broadcasting changed its name to Avco in 1968. Avco kept the radio stations but sold WOAI-TV to United Television, which changed the call sign to KMOL-TV.

On June 13, 1975, San Antonio businessmen L. Lowry Mays and BJ "Red" McCombs acquired WOAI from Avco Broadcasting. They already owned easy listening FM station KEEZ, acquired in 1972, and switched it to a Top 40 format. WOAI's "clear channel" signal would become the namesake of their new company, Clear Channel Communications.

=== Shift to talk ===
WOAI began to move towards talk programming, and stopped playing music by the late 1970s. In 1979, KEEZ switched its call letters to WOAI-FM playing an easy listening format. In 1981 WOAI-FM switched to country music as KAJA "KJ*97". Through the 1980s, WOAI relied more on its newsroom and focused on local and national news, local talk shows and agricultural reports. The station also began including sports play-by-play, especially after acquiring the radio contract for all San Antonio Spurs NBA basketball games. WOAI was the radio home of the San Antonio Gunslingers in the United States Football League (USFL).

In 1998, Clear Channel acquired the parent company of Premiere Radio Networks, which syndicated national talk shows such as The Rush Limbaugh Show, Dr. Laura, Dr. Dean Edell, The Jim Rome Show and Coast to Coast AM. Rush and Dr. Laura had already been airing in San Antonio on talk radio competitor 550 KTSA and were switched over to WOAI's line up. WOAI news anchor Bob Guthrie celebrated 50 years on the radio station in 2006.

In 2001, WOAI regained a TV sister station when Clear Channel acquired KMOL-TV, which had been WOAI-TV from its founding in 1949 until its sale in 1974. In December 2002, KMOL-TV was granted permission from the Federal Communications Commission (FCC) to change its call sign back to WOAI-TV. The TV station has since been sold twice, to Newport Television and then to current owner Sinclair Broadcast Group. In May 2012, WOAI briefly added an FM simulcast over translator station K289BN at 105.7 MHz, but this only lasted for four months. On September 19, 2012, the translator switched to simulcasting co-owned classic country station KRPT.

On September 16, 2014, Clear Channel renamed itself iHeartMedia, Inc. This brought its corporate name in line with its iHeartRadio internet platform.
