= KTKR =

Sports radio station in San Antonio

Coordinates: 29°26′58″N 98°18′33″W

- San Antonio, Texas; United States
- Broadcast area: San Antonio metropolitan area
- Frequency: 760 kHz
- Branding: Ticket 760 AM

Programming
- Format: Sports
- Affiliations: Fox Sports Radio; Houston Astros; Houston Texans; UTSA Roadrunners; Westwood One Sports

Ownership
- Owner: iHeartMedia, Inc.; (iHM Licenses, LLC)
- Sister stations: KAJA, KQXT-FM, KRPT, KXXM, KZEP-FM, WOAI

History
- First air date: May 10, 1984
- Former call signs: KSJL (1984–1993); KZXS (1993–1995)
- Call sign meaning: "Talk Radio" from brand adopted in 1985

Technical information
- Licensing authority: FCC
- Facility ID: 11945
- Class: B
- Power: 50,000 watts (day); 1,000 watts (night)

Links
- Public license information: Public file; LMS
- Webcast: Listen live (via iHeartRadio)
- Website: ticket760.iheart.com

KTKR (760 AM) is a commercial radio station in San Antonio, Texas. Known as "Ticket 760", it airs a sports radio format and is owned by iHeartMedia, Inc. Its studios are on Stone Oak Parkway in the Stone Oak neighborhood in Far North San Antonio.

KTKR’s daytime power is 50,000 watts, the maximum for commercial AM stations, and has a nighttime power of 1,000 watts. At all times, it uses a directional antenna with a four-tower array. The transmitter site is off Green Road in Converse, near Interstate 10.

== Programming ==
Most of KTKR's programming is from Fox Sports Radio. It has two local sports shows in afternoon drive time, The Mike Taylor Show and The Andy Everett Show. In middays, Ticket 760 carries The Dan Patrick Show and The Herd with Colin Cowherd. Various Fox Sports personalities are heard in early mornings, nights and weekends.

KTKR serves as the flagship station of the University of Texas San Antonio Roadrunners football and basketball. The station is also the local affiliate of Texas Longhorns basketball, Houston Astros baseball, Houston Texans football and Westwood One's NFL broadcasts.

== History ==
=== KSJL ===
The station got its construction permit in the early 1980s. It received its KSJL call sign on July 19, 1982. It officially signed on the air on May 10, 1984. It was owned by Inner City Broadcasting and called itself "All Hit 76 KSJL," airing Top 40 hits and broadcasting in AM stereo.

It later became part of "Super Q 96/76" when Inner City Broadcasting acquired 96.1 KSLR-FM from C&W Wireless in 1986. The combo carried a Contemporary Hit Radio format. In late 1988, the simulcast ended. KSJL 760 switched its programming to the Satellite Music Network's "Z Rock" heavy metal format. This lasted until 1992 when the Satellite Music Network would not renew Z-Rock affiliations on the AM band.

Inner City decided to switch 760 AM to "The Touch" format, a national Urban Adult Contemporary service. In 1993, Inner City Broadcasting sold KSJL to Clear Channel Communications for $725,000. (Clear Channel became iHeartMedia in 2014.) As a result of Clear Channel's ownership, KSJL's Urban AC format was moved to 96.1 FM, replacing "96rock" KSAQ.

=== KZXS and KTKR ===
Clear Channel switched KSJL to a talk and sports format. It used the call sign KZXS but the station was branded as "WOAI-760," to capitalize on its popular AM sister station. KZXS carried a number of syndicated talk shows, including Larry King.

In 1995, 760 AM become "KTKR Talk Radio 760," dropping its sports programming and no longer identified as a sister station to WOAI. One year later, KTKR flipped to all-sports as The Ticket 760. It began carrying a mix of Fox Sports Radio and local sports hosts.

When WOAI-TV was owned by Clear Channel, KTKR produced sports reports for the WOAI newscasts.
