= IHeartMedia =

American mass media corporation

iHeartMedia, Inc.
- Formerly: CC Media Holdings, Inc.; (iHeartMedia, Inc. holding company)
- Type: Public
- Traded as: Nasdaq: IHRT (Class A Common Stock)
- Industry: Radio broadcasting; Podcasting; Digital media; live events
- Founded: 1972; 54 years ago (Clear Channel Communications subsidiary); 2014; 12 years ago (iHeartMedia, Inc. holding company)
- Founders: Lowry Mays; Red McCombs
- Headquarters: San Antonio, Texas, U.S.
- Key people: Bob Pittman (chairman and CEO); Rich Bressler (president, chief operating officer); Ann Marie Licata (CEO, Multiplatform Group); Conal Byrne (CEO, Digital Audio Group); Mark Gray (CEO, Audio and Media Services Group)
- Products: Bauer Media Outdoor UK; Black Information Network; Clear Channel Outdoor (50%); Clear Channel UK (50%); Evolution; HowStuffWorks iHeartRadio; Mediabase; Premiere Networks; Radio Computing Services; Triton Digital; The Volume
- Revenue: ▲US$3.86 billion (2025)
- Operating income: ▲US-$20.6 million (2025)
- Net income: ▲ −US$473 million (2025)
- Total assets: ▼US$5.13 billion (2025)
- Total equity: ▼US-$1.83 billion (2025)
- Number of employees: 9,550 (2025)
- Divisions: iHeartMedia (sans "Inc." suffix; formerly Clear Channel Media and Entertainment, Clear Channel Radio, et al.)
- Subsidiaries: Broader Media, LLC; iHeartCommunications, Inc.; iHeartMedia and Entertainment, Inc.; iHeartMedia Capital I, LLC; Voxnest, Inc.
- Website: iheartmedia.com

iHeartMedia, Inc., or CC Media Holdings, Inc., is an American mass media corporation headquartered in San Antonio, Texas. It is the holding company of iHeartCommunications, Inc., formerly Clear Channel Communications, Inc., a company founded by Lowry Mays and Red McCombs in 1972, and later taken private by Bain Capital and Thomas H. Lee Partners in a leveraged buyout in 2008.

As a result of the 2008 buyout, Clear Channel Communications, Inc. became a wholly owned subsidiary of CC Media Holdings, Inc. On September 16, 2014, CC Media Holdings, Inc. was rebranded iHeartMedia, Inc., and Clear Channel Communications, Inc., became iHeartCommunications, Inc.

iHeartMedia, Inc. specializes in radio broadcasting, podcasting, digital and live events through division iHeartMedia (sans "Inc." suffix; formerly Clear Channel Media and Entertainment, Clear Channel Radio, et al.) and subsidiary iHeartMedia and Entertainment, Inc. (formerly Clear Channel Broadcasting, Inc.); the company owns more than 870 full-power AM and FM radio stations in the U.S., making it the country's largest owner of radio stations. The company has also been involved in internet radio and podcasting via the digital platform iHeartRadio (from which the company derives its current name).

In the past, the company was also involved in live events and out-of-home advertising. The company spun off these businesses in 2005 and 2019 respectively, as the present-day Live Nation Entertainment and Clear Channel Outdoor.

== History ==
=== 20th century ===
Clear Channel's logo

Clear Channel Communications purchased its first FM station, KEEZ-FM in San Antonio, Texas, in 1972. The company purchased the second "clear channel" AM station WOAI in 1975. In 1976, the company purchased its first stations outside of San Antonio. KXXO (now KAKC) and KMOD-FM in Tulsa were acquired under the name "San Antonio Broadcasting" (same as KEEZ). Stations were also added in Port Arthur, Texas (KPAC-AM-FM, now KDEI and KTJM, from Port Arthur College), and El Paso, Texas (KELP, now KQBU) from John Walton Jr.

In 1992, the U.S. Congress relaxed radio ownership rules slightly, allowing the company to acquire more than two stations per market. By 1995, Clear Channel owned 43 radio stations and 16 television stations. When the Telecommunications Act of 1996 became law, the act deregulated media ownership, allowing a company to own more stations than previously allowed. Clear Channel went on a subsequent buying spree, purchasing more than 70 other media companies and individual stations.

In a few cases, following purchase of a competitor, Clear Channel was forced to divest some of its stations, as it was above the legal thresholds in some cities. In 2005, the courts ruled that Clear Channel must also divest itself of some "border blaster" radio stations in international border cities, such as the alternative rock radio station XETRA-FM ("91X") in Tijuana/San Diego.

In 1997, Clear Channel expanded and diversified its business, purchasing Eller Media, a billboard media company, led by Karl Eller.

In 1998, it made its first move outside of the US when it acquired the leading UK outdoor advertising company More Group plc, which was led by Roger Parry; Clear Channel went on to buy many other outdoor advertising, radio broadcasting, and live events companies around the world, which were then re-branded Clear Channel International. These included a 51% stake in Clear Media Ltd. in China. R. Steven Hicks and Hicks, Muse, Tate & Furst began Capstar Broadcasting in 1996, and a year later had become the largest owner of radio stations in the country, with 243 stations in total. In August 1997, Capstar and Hicks, Muse, Tate & Furst announced plans to acquire SFX Broadcasting, with the resulting company owning 314 stations in 79 markets and ranking as the third-largest radio group by income. A year later, Chancellor Media Corporation and Capstar Broadcasting Corporation announced a merger that would result in Chancellor Media owning 463 stations in 105 markets when the deal was completed in second quarter 1999. Hicks, Muse, Tate & Furst owned 59 percent of Capstar, with 355 stations in 83 markets, and was the largest single owner of Chancellor (which had 108 stations in 22 markets), with 15 percent of the stock. Chancellor Media later became AMFM Inc., which was acquired by Clear Channel in a deal announced October 3, 1999, and valued at $17.4 billion. The resulting company would own 830 radio stations, 19 television stations, and over 425,000 outdoor displays in 32 countries.

In 1999, the company acquired Jacor Communications, a radio corporation based in Cincinnati. The company also made an investment in the new satellite radio service XM Satellite Radio, giving it the rights to program a selection of stations on the service (which would be drawn from some of its stations and syndicated output). On October 4, 1999, Clear Channel announced it would acquire AMFM Inc., the nation's second-largest radio company for $23.5 billion. After receiving approval from federal regulators on August 16, 2000, the acquisition was completed on August 30, 2000.

=== 21st century ===
In 2000, Clear Channel acquired Robert F. X. Sillerman's SFX Entertainment, a concert promoter that had focused on consolidation of regional promoters under a national operation. In 2005, Clear Channel spun off its entertainment and live events business as Live Nation.

On November 16, 2006, Clear Channel announced plans to go private, being bought out by two private-equity firms, Thomas H. Lee Partners and Bain Capital Partners for $26.7 billion, which included their assumption of $8 billion in Clear Channel debt. This was just under a 10 percent premium above its closing price of $35.36 a share on November 16: the deal valued Clear Channel at $37.60 per share.

In a separate transaction also announced on November 16, 2006, Clear Channel said it would seek buyers for all of its television stations and 539 of its smaller radio stations, because the private-equity buyers were not interested in owning television or small-market radio. Over a hundred stations were assigned to Aloha Station Trust, LLC upon the consummation of the merger. The television stations were sold to Newport Television, a broadcaster owned by Providence Equity Partners, on April 23, 2007.

Due to the credit market crunch of 2007, Clear Channel encountered difficulty selling some of its radio stations. Clear Channel's attempt to sell off over 100 stations to GoodRadio.TV, LLC was rejected by the equity firm backing the deal. The deal then shifted to Frequency License LLC, but took longer to resolve itself as the two parties were engaged in lawsuits. On top of that, the sale of Clear Channel's television portfolio to Newport Television had also turned uncertain, as Providence considered other options, although this transaction was ultimately completed.

On December 4, 2007, Clear Channel announced that they had extended the termination date of the buyout from December 12, 2007, to June 12, 2008. On July 24, 2008, Clear Channel held a special shareholder meeting, during which the majority of shareholders accepted a revised $36-per-share offer from Bain Capital and Thomas H. Lee Partners, revaluing the deal at $17.9 billion plus debt. Shareholders received either $36 in cash, or one share of CC Media Class A common stock for each share of Clear Channel common stock held. The company announced that it would move to more centralized programming and lay off 1,500 employees, or approximately 7% of its workforce, on January 20, 2009. The reasoning was bleak economic conditions and debt from its transition to a private company. By the completion of the restructuring in May 2009, a total of 2,440 positions were eliminated.

In early 2010, it was announced that the company was facing the possibility of bankruptcy due to its "crippling debt". After 21 years, Mark Mays stepped down as president and CEO of Clear Channel on June 23, 2010. Mays remained as chairman of the board. Later that year, MTV co-founder Robert W. "Bob" Pittman joined the company and would eventually become CEO of CC Media Holdings.

In August 2013, Clear Channel sold its minority stake in SiriusXM for $135.5 million. This also resulted in the removal of most Clear Channel-programmed stations on the service, besides simulcasts of WHTZ and KIIS-FM.

On January 6, 2014, Clear Channel announced a marketing partnership with Robert F. X. Sillerman's SFX Entertainment (a second incarnation of a live events company that had been sold to Clear Channel, which spun off to form Live Nation), to collaborate on electronic dance music content for its digital and terrestrial radio outlets, including a Beatport top 20 countdown show. The partnership expanded upon the company's existing EDM-oriented outlets, including Evolution. Staff, including John Sykes, believed that the deal would help provide a higher level of national exposure to current and up and coming EDM artists.

In September 2014, it was announced that the company would rename Clear Channel Communications to iHeartMedia, alluding to its iHeartRadio platform to reflect the company's growing emphasis on digital media and internet radio. The previous name "Clear Channel" came from AM broadcasting, referring to a channel (frequency) on which only one station transmits. In the U.S., clear-channel stations have exclusive rights to their frequencies throughout most of the continent at night, when AM signals travel far due to skywave. CEO Bob Pittman said that the company had been "doing progressive stuff", yet were still "named after AM radio stations".

Beginning in 2008, iHeartMedia struggled to pay down more than $20 billion in debt the company assumed from its leveraged buyout. Various media outlets, including Bloomberg News, Reuters, Radio Ink, and iHeartMedia's hometown newspaper the San Antonio Express-News, claimed that either bankruptcy or a major restructuring was likely. On April 20, 2017, the company warned investors that it might not survive over the following 10 months.

In 2016, one of the company's directors, Julia B. Donnelly, left the board of iHeartCommunications and was replaced by Laura A. Grattan, a director at Thomas H. Lee. Grattan was named to the board of managers of iHeartMedia Capital I, LLC, the direct parent of iHeartCommunications, as well as the board of directors of iHeartMedia, Inc., the indirect parent of iHeartCommunications.

On November 30, 2017, it was reported that a group of creditors had rejected iHeartMedia's latest debt restructuring proposal, instead bringing out a deal where the company might file for bankruptcy. On March 15, 2018, the company filed for Chapter 11 bankruptcy, and claimed that it reached an agreement to restructure $10 billion of its over $20 billion in debt.

In September 2018, iHeartMedia acquired HowStuffWorks' podcast network Stuff Media for $55 million. On November 19, 2018, iHeartMedia announced its intent to acquire Jelli, the provider of a programmatic advertising platform for radio stations.

In January 2019, the U.S. Bankruptcy Court for the Southern District of Texas approved a creditor-supported plan for iHeartMedia to exit bankruptcy, which would reduce the company's debt from $16.1 billion to $5.75 billion. The plan included the spin-out of iHeartMedia's 89.1% stake in its out-of-home advertising division Clear Channel Outdoor. In April 2019, the company also filed a proposed initial public offering.

iHeartMedia emerged from Chapter 11 bankruptcy in May 2019, with a new board of directors and the spin-out of Clear Channel Outdoor, but maintaining its existing leadership of CEO Bob Pittman and President Rich Bressler. Rather than pursue its IPO (which was estimated to potentially be valued at $1.1 billion), iHeartMedia instead received approval for a direct listing on the Nasdaq.

On January 14, 2020, iHeartMedia announced a major restructuring, as part of an effort to "modernize our company to take advantage of the significant investments we have made in new technology and aligning our operating structure to match the technology-powered businesses we are now in." This included the restructuring of its Markets Group into three divisions: the Regions division for its largest markets, the Metropolitan division for other major cities, and the Communities division for smaller markets and added a multi-market partnerships unit, and announced the development of centers of excellence that would use technology investments to "provide a better experience for listeners and business partners and a more efficient process for all of its employees".

The restructuring was accompanied by a major round of layoffs and displacements, with a large number of staff members and on-air personalities impacted.

On April 24, 2026, The New York Times reported that SiriusXM was in early talks to merge with IHeartMedia. iHeart previously had a stake in the company until August 2013. However, on May 29, 2026, it was reported that merger talks were stalled.

On June 18, 2026, iHeartMedia announced the "Audiograph", which is designed as "a suite of advertising capabilities that, for the first time, will bring digital-like targeting, identity-based planning and measurement, and outcome-based attribution to broadcast radio at scale."

In June 2026, iHeartMedia announced another major restructuring, as part of an effort to "expand and deepen our support for our communities, markets and sales teams", "fully leverage our technology to deliver an even stronger product for listeners wherever they live", "move faster and operate with greater precision across markets", and "position us not just to adapt to the future, but to lead it." The reorganization resulted in mass layoffs by the company, in which was considered the biggest staff purge in radio history. Markets like Atlantic City, New Jersey, Spokane, Washington, Fort Collins, Colorado, Sussex County, New Jersey and Erie, Pennsylvania have lost all of their remaining local on-air talents, including rhythmic contemporary radio station KGGI in Riverside, California.

As well, during this time, iHeartMedia made nationalization changes across many of its stations, in which they moved to the company's "national" custom music logs. Among the stations affected was KZIS in Sacramento, California was affected by this as it shifted from a 90s/2000s hits-based format to hot adult contemporary, which began to utilize iHeartMedia's "Today's Mix" log.

== Businesses ==
iHeartMedia has purchased interest in, or outright acquired, companies in a number of media or advertising-related industries. This is not an exhaustive list.

=== Radio ===
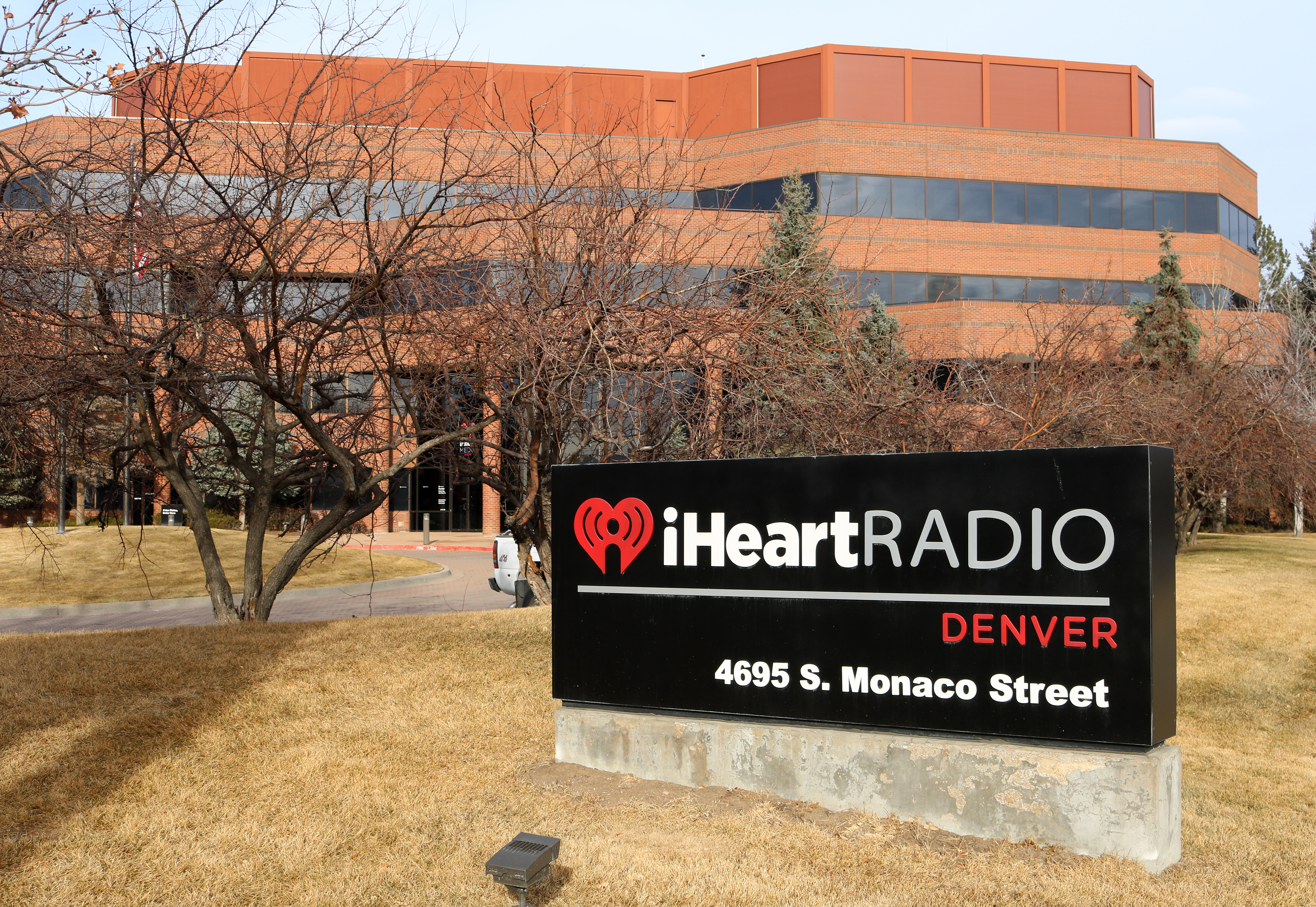
iHeartRadio's offices and studios in Denver, which houses KTCL, KDHT, KBCO, KRFX, KOA, KBPI, KHOW, KDFD, and KWBL

With 855 stations, iHeartMedia is the largest radio station group owner in the United States, both by number of stations and by revenue. The 855 stations reach more than 110 million listeners every week, and 276 million every month. According to BIA Financial Network, iHeartMedia recorded more than $3.5 billion in revenues as of 2021, $1 billion more than the number-two group owner, Audacy.

In June 2012, the company announced that it would become the first U.S. radio group to partner with record labels to pay performance royalties directly to labels and musicians (in addition to songwriters and producers). The royalties are paid via revenue sharing for advertising across platforms (including digital), rather than a flat payment each time a song is played. Big Machine Label Group was announced as the first partner in this scheme. Pittman stated that the arrangement would let "labels and artists participate in the revenue of broadcast radio immediately and in digital radio as it builds".

==== Radio acquisitions ====
iHeartMedia has purchased stations from or acquired the following radio companies:

- Ackerley Group
- AMFM Inc.
  - Chancellor Media
    - Chancellor Broadcasting
      - American Media Inc.
      - Colfax Communications
      - OmniAmerica
      - Shamrock Broadcasting
    - Evergreen Media
      - Broadcasting Partners
      - Brown Organization
      - Gannett Radio
      - Pyramid Communications
    - Viacom Radio
  - Capstar (also operating under Gulfstar, Southern Star, Pacific Star, and Atlantic Star)
    - Benchmark Communications
    - Commodore Media
    - Osborn Communications
    - Patterson Broadcasting
    - SFX Broadcasting
      - Liberty Broadcasting
      - Prism Radio Partners
    - Triathlon Broadcasting
- Apex Broadcasting
- Clark Broadcasting
- Dame Media
- Eastern Radio Assets
- Jacor
  - Citicasters Communications
  - Nationwide Communications, Inc.
  - Regent Communications
  - Noble Broadcast Group
- Metro Networks
- Mondosphere Broadcasting
- Metroplex Communications
- Paxson Communications
- Quad City
- Radio Equity Partners
- Roberts Radio
- Taylor Broadcasting
- Trumper Communications
- US Radio
- XM Satellite Radio (service and programming agreement)

=== Outdoor advertising ===
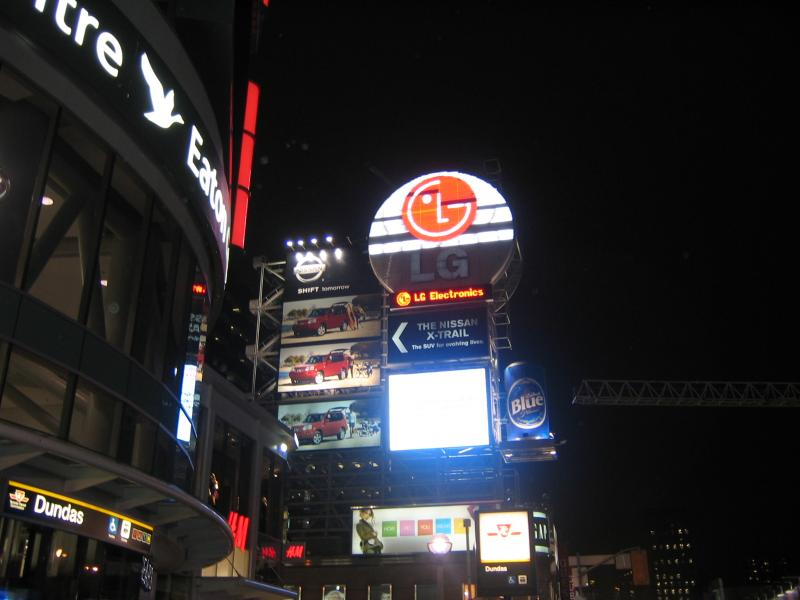
Billboards at Sankofa Square in Toronto, owned by Clear Channel, in 2005

Clear Channel Outdoor (CCO) is an advertising company that was previously owned by iHeartMedia. In May 2019, it was spun out from iHeartMedia as part of its exit from bankruptcy.

=== Television ===
Clear Channel Television is a defunct television broadcaster and a former subsidiary of the group that was in operation, for nearly 20 years, from 1988 to 2008. It owned more than 40 stations, most of them were from the Big Six networks, a few of which are independent (non-network affiliates). It was initially headed by J. Daniel Sullivan, who set up as president of Clear Channel's television division.

The group made its beginnings when the first television station iHeartMedia purchased as Clear Channel was WPMI in Mobile, Alabama in 1988. Later that year, Clear Channel Communications bought out KDTU-TV in Tucson, Arizona, which became Clear Channel's second television station. On March 13, 1989, Clear Channel Television bought out KOKI-TV for $6.5 million. This was followed on July 3 of that year with the purchase of Fox affiliate WAWS-TV in Jacksonville, Florida, from Malrite Communications Group, for $8.1 million.

Eventually over time, Clear Channel Television became the second-largest independent television group, behind Sinclair Broadcast Group. In 1990, Clear Channel bought out its fifth television station, KSAS-TV in Wichita, Kansas, for $7.9 million. In 1991, Clear Channel bought out KLRT-TV in Little Rock, Arkansas for $6.6 million. In 1992, Clear Channel bought out WPTY-TV in Memphis from Chase Communications for $21 million. Later on in 1993, the company bought out KITN-TV in Minneapolis/St. Paul from Nationwide Communications, followed in 1994 by the purchase of WXXA-TV in Albany from Heritage Communications, for $25.5 million.

In 1991, Clear Channel Television jumped into the foray of local marketing agreements, starting in 1991 with WJTC, which Clear Channel operated through a LMA with WPMI, and subsequently later on in 1992, when KASN entered into a LMA with Clear Channel's KLRT-TV. Clear Channel also entered into a deal with Providence Journal Company, who owns Fox affiliate KMSB in Tucson to operate KTTU through a local marketing agreement. Memphis also jumped onto the board when WLMT entered into a LMA with Clear Channel's WPTY. Also in 1993, Clear Channel entered into a local marketing agreement with RDS Communications to operate KTFO-TV in Tulsa, which most of the inventory will be supplied by KOKI. Later on, in 1994, in Jacksonville, WTEV-TV entered into a local marketing agreement with WAWS, the Clear Channel television station.

In 1994, Fox shockingly announced its intentions to purchase WHBQ-TV, which displaced Clear Channel's WPTY-TV as its Fox Memphis affiliate. Also that year, as part of a group deal involving stations acquired by SF Broadcasting, Clear Channel's WPMI-TV in Mobile was set to be displaced as Mobile's Fox affiliate by WALA-TV as part of a three-station deal with the other Burnham stations. These moves didn't sit well for Clear Channel Television, whose president Dan Sullivan thought they wanted to affiliate it with the ousted networks, including NBC in Mobile, and ABC in Memphis.

In 1995, Clear Channel purchased its first Big Three network affiliate, WHP-TV in Harrisburg, for $30 million. It was subsequently followed it up when Gateway Communications, owners of WLYH-TV entered into a LMA with Clear Channel's WHP-TV. Later on that year, J. Dan Sullivan left Clear Channel Television to start out Sullivan Broadcasting to acquire the Act III Broadcasting stations. He was then succeeded by Rip Rioridan as president. In 1996, it bought out WPRI-TV in Providence from CBS, which CBS did not keep due to slight signal overlap with WBZ-TV in Boston. Also that year, Argyle Television Holdings II, who owned WNAC-TV entered into a LMA with Clear Channel's WPRI.

As part of the radio-TV strategy, Clear Channel acquired Jacor Communications, which incorporated WKRC-TV in Cincinnati into the Clear Channel Television branch. Once FCC relaxed its duopoly rules, Clear Channel acquired stations that were originally LMA markets outright, including WLMT in Memphis, KTFO in Tulsa, WTEV in Jacksonville, KASN in Little Rock and WJTC in Mobile. Also in 2000, Clear Channel sold WPRI to Sunrise Television for $50 million. Later on in 2001, William Moll become the president of Clear Channel Television, replacing Rioridan.

The former logo for Clear Channel Television, used from 2001 to 2007.

In 2001, after acquiring the stations of Chris-Craft Industries, Fox Television Stations traded WFTC to Clear Channel Television for Fox's own TV stations KMOL-TV in San Antonio and KTVX in Salt Lake City. In 2002, Clear Channel acquired Ackerley Group, which incorporated its television holdings into the Clear Channel Television portfolio. Also that year, Clear Channel sold KTTU in Tucson to Belo outright. In 2003, Clear Channel announced that they would sell WUTR to Mission Broadcasting. In 2004, Clear Channel bought WETM outright after the death of Robert Smith, the founder of Smith Broadcasting. In 2005, Clear Channel acquired another Salt Lake City television station KUWB from Acme Communications for $18.5 million in cash. In 2006, Don Perry was then named president and CEO of Clear Channel Television.

Ever that, in the 2000s, Clear Channel began the trend of using legacy callsigns for former radio sisters as new call designated signs for existing Clear Channel TV properties, since it already owned radio stations, although WKRC-TV already used the moniker when it was under Clear Channel ownership. In 2002, San Antonio's Clear Channel station KMOL-TV was rebranded to WOAI-TV, the original call letters that station is using from 1948 to 1974, matching up with radio sister WOAI-AM. In 2005, WOKR, the Rochester Clear Channel affiliate was rebranded to WHAM-TV, the original call letters for an unrelated Rochester station WROC-TV from 1948 to 1956, matching up for radio sister WHAM-AM. Also that year, sister station in Syracuse, WIXT was rebranded to WSYR-TV, the original call letters for WSTM-TV from 1950 to 1980, matching up for radio sister WSYR-AM.

In 2007, the company entered into an agreement to sell all its television stations to Providence Equity Partners for $1.2 billion, a deal that eventually closed in March 2008. Earlier that year, Don Perry left as president and CEO of Clear Channel Television. All former Clear Channel television stations were owned by Newport Television, while the other six were flipped to other buyers by Newport. In 2012 to mid-2013, Newport sold off all of its holdings to several other television groups, including Cox Media Group, Nexstar Media Group, and Sinclair Broadcast Group.

==== Former Clear Channel-owned stations ====
Stations are arranged alphabetically by state and by city of license.

City of license / Market	Station	Channel	Years owned	Current status
Mobile, AL–Pensacola, FL	WPMI-TV	15	1988–2008	Roar affiliate owned by Deerfield Media (Note: Operated through an SSA by Sinclair Broadcast Group.)
Mobile, AL–Pensacola, FL	WJTC	44	2001–2008	Independent station owned by Deerfield Media
Fairbanks, AK	KTVF	11	2002–2008	NBC affiliate owned by Gray Television
Tucson, AZ	KTTU	18	1989–2002	The CW/MyNetworkTV affiliate owned by the Tegna subsidiary of Nexstar Media Group (Note: Operated through an SSA by Gray Television.)
Little Rock, AR	KLRT-TV	16	1991–2008	Fox affiliate owned by Mission Broadcasting (Note: Operated through an SSA by Nexstar Media Group.)
Little Rock, AR	KASN	38	2000–2008	The CW affiliate owned by Mission Broadcasting
Bakersfield, CA	KGET-TV	17	2002–2008	NBC affiliate owned by Nexstar Media Group
Bakersfield, CA	KKEY-LP	11	2003–2008	Telemundo affiliate owned by Nexstar Media Group
Eureka, CA	KVIQ	6	2002–2005	Defunct, went dark in 2018, license cancelled in 2020 (Note: Callsign changed to KJRW prior to the shutdown; intellectual unit and CBS programming transferred to a Northwest Broadcasting-owned license and renamed KVIQ-LD.)
Fresno, CA	KGPE	47	2002–2008	CBS affiliate owned by Nexstar Media Group
Monterey–Salinas, CA	KION-TV	46	2002–2008	CBS/Fox affiliate owned by News-Press & Gazette Company
Monterey–Salinas, CA	KCBA	35	2002–2008	CW+ affiliate owned by VistaWest Media (Note: Operated through an SSA by News-Press & Gazette Company.)
Monterey–Salinas, CA	KMUV-LP	23	2005–2008	Telemundo affiliate owned by News-Press & Gazette Company
Santa Maria, CA	KCOY-TV	12	2002–2008	Telemundo affiliate owned by VistaWest Media, LLC (Note: Operated through an SSA by News-Press & Gazette Company.)
Santa Maria, CA	KKFX-CA	24	2002–2008	Fox affiliate owned by News-Press & Gazette Company
Santa Rosa–San Francisco, CA	KFTY	50	2002–2008	QVC2 affiliate KEMO-TV, owned by Innovate Corp.
Jacksonville, FL	WAWS	30	1989–2008	Fox affiliate WFOX-TV, owned by Cox Media Group
Jacksonville, FL	WTEV-TV	47	2001–2008	CBS affiliate WJAX-TV, owned by Cox Media Group
Wichita, KS	KSAS-TV	24	1990–2008	Fox/MyNetworkTV affiliate owned by Sinclair Broadcast Group
Wichita, KS	KMTW	36	1997–2008 (Note: Owned by Paramount Stations Group and Mercury Broadcasting Company, Clear Channel operated KMTW under a local marketing agreement with KSAS.)	Roar affiliate owned by Mercury Broadcasting Company
Hoisington, KS	KOCW (Note: Satellite of KSAS-TV.)	14	2001–2008	Fox/MyNetworkTV affiliate owned by Sinclair Broadcast Group
Salina, KS	KAAS	18	1990–2008	Fox/MyNetworkTV affiliate owned by Sinclair Broadcast Group
Minneapolis - St. Paul, MN	KITN-TV/; WFTC	29	1993–2001	MyNetworkTV affiliate owned by Fox Television Stations
Albany–Schenectady–Troy, NY	WXXA-TV	23	1994–2008	Fox affiliate owned by Mission Broadcasting
Binghamton, NY	WIVT	34	2002–2008	ABC affiliate owned by Nexstar Media Group
Binghamton, NY	WBGH-CA	20	2002–2008	NBC affiliate owned by Nexstar Media Group
Elmira, NY	WETM-TV	18	2004–2008	NBC affiliate owned by Nexstar Media Group
Rochester, NY	WOKR/; WHAM-TV	13	2002–2008	ABC affiliate owned by Sinclair Broadcast Group
Syracuse, NY	WIXT-TV/; WSYR-TV	9	2002–2008	ABC affiliate owned by Nexstar Media Group
Utica, NY	WUTR	20	2002–2004	ABC affiliate owned by Mission Broadcasting
Watertown, NY	WWTI	50	2002–2008	ABC affiliate owned by Nexstar Media Group
Cincinnati, OH	WKRC-TV	12	1999–2008	CBS affiliate owned by Sinclair Broadcast Group
Defiance, OH	WDFM-LP	19	1998–2018	Independent WNHO-LD, owned by American Christian Television Services
Tulsa, OK	KOKI-TV	23	1990–2008	Roar affiliate owned by Standard Media
Tulsa, OK	KMYT-TV	41	2000–2008	MyNetworkTV affiliate owned by Sinclair Broadcast Group
Eugene, OR	KMTR	16	2002–2008	NBC affiliate owned by Sinclair Broadcast Group
Coos Bay, OR	KMCB (Note: Satellite of KMTR.)	23	2002–2008	NBC affiliate owned by Sinclair Broadcast Group
Roseburg, OR	KTCW	46	2002–2008	NBC affiliate owned by Sinclair Broadcast Group
Harrisburg, PA	WHP-TV	21	1995–2008	CBS affiliate owned by Sinclair Broadcast Group
Harrisburg, PA	WLYH-TV	15	1995–2008 (Note: Owned by Gateway Communications, SJL Broadcasting and Nexstar Broadcasting Group, Clear Channel operated WLYH under a local marketing agreement with WHP.)	Univision affiliate WXBU, owned by Howard Stirk Holdings
Providence, RI	WPRI-TV	12	1996–2001	CBS/MyNetworkTV affiliate owned by Nexstar Media Group
Providence, RI	WNAC-TV	64	1996–2002 (Note: Owned by Argyle Television Holdings II, Hearst-Argyle Television and Sunrise Television, Clear Channel operated WNAC under a local marketing agreement with WPRI.)	Fox/CW affiliate owned by Mission Broadcasting
Jackson, TN	WJKT	16	2000–2008	Fox affiliate owned by Nexstar Media Group
Memphis, TN	WPTY-TV	24	1992–2008	ABC affiliate WATN-TV, owned by the Tegna subsidiary of Nexstar Media Group
Memphis, TN	WLMT	30	2000–2008	The CW/MyNetworkTV affiliate owned by the Tegna subsidiary of Nexstar Media Group
San Antonio, TX	KMOL-TV/; WOAI-TV	4	2001–2008 (Note: Acquired as divestitures from Fox Television Stations' acquisition of BHC Communications.)	NBC/CW affiliate owned by Sinclair Broadcast Group
Salt Lake City, UT	KTVX	4	2001–2008	ABC affiliate owned by Nexstar Media Group
Salt Lake City, UT	KUCW	30	2006–2008	The CW outlet, owned and operated by Nexstar Media Group
Bellingham, WA–Vancouver, BC (Note: Bellingham is nominally in the Seattle market.)	KVOS-TV	12	2002–2008	Univision affiliate owned by Weigel Broadcasting

=== Music charts ===
iHeartMedia owns Mediabase, which provide music charts based on songs and tracks receiving the most spins played on radio stations in the United States and Canada. A majority of stations that report to Mediabase are iHeartMedia outlets but other companies also report to the Mediabase charts. In addition, countdown shows produced by Premiere will utilize Mediabase charts for the basis of their programs.

=== News and information ===
- 24/7 News Source
- Operates iHeartRadio News Network and local news networks in Kentucky, West Virginia, Virginia, Ohio, Oklahoma, Alabama, Tennessee, Georgia, and Florida.
- Premiere Networks
- Acquired and later sold the Agri Broadcast Network (ABN), a farm programming provider in Ohio.
- Publishes Inside Radio magazine
- Total Traffic & Weather Network reports: on-road and traffic conditions across the United States, and in Mexico City, Mexico. These are used by many GPS navigation systems. Total Traffic & Weather also produce and distributes 24/7 News channel on iHeartRadio (from 2016 to 2024, iHeart/TTWN and NBC News formed a content/licensing agreement for NBC News Radio).
- Fan Radio Network: a sports radio network that serves Minnesota, South Dakota, and North Dakota. The flagship station is KFXN-FM in Minneapolis, MN.
- Your Smooth Jazz: 24-hour smooth jazz network provided under the company's "Broadcast Architecture" division.

=== Worldwide ===
- Owns outdoor advertising companies in Brazil, Chile, Finland, France, Italy, Latvia, Norway, Poland, Romania, Singapore, South Africa, Sweden, Switzerland, Turkey, Belgium and Mauritius.
- Owns L & C Outdoor Comunicação Visual Ltda., of Brazil
- United Kingdom
  - Large numbers of billboards (through a takeover of Adshel)
  - See Clear Channel UK

==== Bicycle rental systems ====
Operates urban bicycle sharing systems in several European cities:

City	Country	Launch date	System name	Stations	Bikes
Caen	France			40	350
Dijon	France			33	350
Perpignan	France			15	150
Rennes	France	1998		25	200
Oslo	Norway		Oslo Bysykkel		
Drammen	Norway		Drammen Bysykkel		
Trondheim	Norway		Trondheim Bysykkel		
Barcelona	Spain		Bicing	400	6,000
Zaragoza	Spain		Bizi		
Stockholm	Sweden		City bikes	140	1,000
Malmö	Sweden		Malmö by bike		
Milan	Italy		bikeMi	103	1,300
Antwerp	Belgium	9 juin 2011	Velo Antwerpen	297	4 200

=== Vertical Real Estate ===
In 2003, Clear Channel created the Vertical Real Estate division and hired Scott Quitadamo to promote its tower portfolio. iHeartMedia owns and operates approximately 1,500 broadcast transmission towers across the U.S., many of which are available for co-location by third parties such as cellular and PCS companies, wireless internet, fixed wireless, and other broadcasters.

== Programming ==
iHeartMedia operates the country's largest syndication service, Premiere Networks. In addition, iHeartMedia syndicates a number of its homegrown talk and music shows without the aid of Premiere. While Premiere actively sells its shows to stations, the non-Premiere syndicated shows are often used as a cost-cutting measure and do not have a large sales staff. Those shows also do not carry network-wide advertising (unless distributed by a third party), and allow the affiliates to keep all local spots, which increases their appeal. These networks carry many program hosts of various political ideologies and distribute a variety of programs to both iHeartMedia-owned and non-iHeartMedia-owned stations.

In addition to its own syndication network, iHeartMedia offers studio space and other services to the WestStar TalkRadio Network, which is based at iHeartMedia's studios in Phoenix, Arizona. As a result, many WestStar programs are heard on iHeartMedia stations.

Not all programming heard on iHeartMedia's radio stations are produced in house; however, most of iHeartMedia's stations share many similarities to each other in branding and programming.

=== iHeartRadio ===
iHeartRadio is a free broadcast, podcast and streaming radio platform. It is also the national umbrella brand for iHeartMedia's radio network aggregating its over 860 local iHeartMedia radio stations across the United States, as well as hundreds of other stations from various other media.

=== Alternative stations ===
iHeartMedia Alternative Stations usually are branded as "Radio" (such as Radio 94.5 (KMYT) in Temecula, CA) or "ALT" (Alt 98.7 (KYSR) in Los Angeles). Others include: The Edge, The Buzz, The Project, Star, or X. The Woody Show, which originates from KYSR, serves as the anchor morning show for the iHeartMedia Alternative outlets.

=== Hip-hop, Rap, R&B and rhythmic stations ===
Stations that carry programming catering to black Americans are a big part of many iHeartMedia clusters, particularly Philadelphia, Chicago, and Detroit. In many clusters iHeartMedia has two or more such stations. About half of these stations focus on Rap and Hip-Hop along with younger rhythm and blues sounds. The other half blend some younger rhythm and blues along with some Soul from the 1970s, 1980s, and 1990s along with some current product. In a cluster with multiple hip-hop, rap, R&B, and rhythmic stations owned by iHeartMedia, one is focused on Rap while the other is focused on Soul. Examples include Philadelphia, with WUSL's focus on hip-hop while WDAS-FM focuses on Soul (in addition, the company also owns WGCI-FM in Chicago, which focuses on rap, while WVAZ is focused on Soul. iHeartMedia hip-hop, rap, R&B, and rhythmic stations are branded as "Real" (KRRL Los Angeles), "Beat" (KQBT/Houston, WBTP Tampa) or "Power" (WWPR-FM New York City, WUSL Philadelphia and WHEN Syracuse). In San Francisco, iHeartMedia owned more hip-hop, rap, R&B, and rhythmic stations such as Rhythmic Top 40 KYLD, rhythmic oldies KISQ, and rhythmic contemporary KMEL in that area (KYLD shifted to Top 40/CHR in 2015, KISQ flipped to AC in 2016), and the same happened in Detroit, where the company also owns rhythmic AC WMXD, rhythmic contemporary WJLB and former Rhythmic AC WDTW-FM (now WLLZ). iHeart also have hip-hop, rap, R&B, and rhythmic outlets with heritage and familiarity based on the markets they serve, like WHRK and WDIA in Memphis, and WKKV-FM in Milwaukee.

Another growing format, Classic Hip-Hop/Throwback/Old School (consisting of R&B/Hip-Hop, Rap, and Rhythmic songs from the 1980s, 1990s, and 2000s), can be heard full-time on iHeartRadio, as well as KATZ-FM/St. Louis and KUBT-HD2 in Honolulu. Previously, this format was originated as Rhythmic Oldies, which was launched at KCMG/Los Angeles and later spread to more markets before the former Clear Channel flipped several stations out of the format by the mid-2000s.

For the Rhythmic Top 40 format, similar brandings include "The Beat" (KUBT/Honolulu and WBTT/Ft. Myers), Power 102/El Paso, 104.5 Kiss FM/Beaumont, Texas, "Jam'n" (KXJM/Portland Oregon, KSSX/San Diego, and WJMN/Boston; a similar "Jammin'" is used at WSTV/Roanoke & WJJX/Lynchburg). A "B" has been used at KBOS-FM/Fresno since the 1980s. Other Rhythmics, such as KUBE/Seattle, KDON-FM/Salinas-Monterey and KGGI/Riverside-San Bernardino, simply use the call letters and/or frequency. Most of these stations target a multicultural audience and play Rhythmic Pop, R&B/Hip-Hop, and Dance tracks.

For rhythmic AC stations, they used to have the "Party" branding (particularly during the time when most used Wake Up with Whoopi out of WKTU as their morning show), but the two "Party" stations in Denver (KDHT) and Las Vegas (KYMT, the former KPLV) have since exited the Rhythmic AC format. KDHT and KYMT moved to top 40, but continue to use the "Party" branding (KYMT is currently mainstream rock). The Breakfast Club Morning Show out of WWPR-FM in New York and "Big Boy's Neighborhood" out of KRRL in Los Angeles are iHeartMedia's syndicated urban morning shows. In 2017, for IHM's 3rd season they produced rhythmic AC programming.

=== Smooth jazz ===
IHeartMedia syndicates the Smooth Jazz Network (aka Your Smooth Jazz), which is programmed by Broadcast Architecture. Unless otherwise noted, all Smooth Jazz Network stations will carry the following schedule: Kenny G and Sandy Kovach in morning drive time, Miranda Wilson in midday, Allen Kepler in afternoon drive time, and Maria Lopez in evenings, with no disc jockeys overnight. Weekend programming consists of the Smooth Jazz Top 20 with Allen Kepler, as well as the Dave Koz Radio Show.

=== Dance and EDM ===
The first radio programs included Electric Sound Stage, Club Phusion, Trancid, Pride Radio, PrototypeRadio, The Spin*Cycle and Classic Dance. Although they have no full-powered stations programming a Dance or EDM (Electronic Dance Music) format, iHeartMedia has FM translators and HD2 platforms broadcasting the EDM-intensive Evolution platform (KZZP/Phoenix is the flagship station, serving as a reporter on Billboard's Dance/Mix Show Airplay panel), while the LGBT community is served by the more broader-based Pride Radio (with WFLZ/Tampa serving as the flagship station as well as a Dance/Mix Show Airplay reporter). However, iHeartMedia's Top 40/CHR and Rhythmic Top 40 outlets incorporate a majority of Dance songs onto its playlist and set aside airtime blocks for mix shows. A weekly countdown program, America's Dance 30, airs on Evolution and selected iHeart Top 40 and Rhythmic stations.

=== Talk radio ===
==== News/Talk stations ====
News/talk stations owned by iHeartMedia often have a standard slate of hosts. The morning show is usually local, with other time slots filled by local and syndicated hosts. Talk shows heard on many iHeartMedia talk stations include The Glenn Beck Radio Program (Beck having gotten his talk show start at iHeartMedia-owned WFLA in Tampa, which serves as its home station), The Clay Travis and Buck Sexton Show (does not have a home station but is based in Nashville), The Sean Hannity Show (based at WOR in New York), The Jesse Kelly Show (based at KPRC Houston) and Coast to Coast AM with George Noory, all of which are syndicated by Premiere Networks. The Mark Levin Show (based at WABC in New York and WMAL-FM in Washington, syndicated from Westwood One) and The Dave Ramsey Show (based in Nashville and independently syndicated) are non-Premiere shows which air on several iHeartMedia stations.

Before his death in 2021, The Rush Limbaugh Show was almost universally carried on iHeartMedia stations in markets where the company has a news/talk station, including New York City: WOR was acquired in 2013 by Clear Channel and began carrying Limbaugh's program in 2014 following a long relationship with now-Red Apple Media-owned WABC. In markets where iHeartMedia-owned news/talk stations are not highly rated (such as Dallas and Atlanta), iHeartMedia has chosen to sell popular syndicated shows such as Coast to Coast AM and Sean Hannity to rival talk stations. Syndicated morning news programs like America in The Morning (from Westwood One) and This Morning, America's First News with Gordon Deal (from Compass Media Networks) are also heard on a few iHeartMedia-owned stations. In markets where the local iHeartMedia news/talk station does not have its own local morning show, Armstrong & Getty from KSTE Sacramento and The Michael DelGiorno Show from KLAC Nashville are often heard instead.

While most of iHeartMedia's news/talk stations carry some combination of Beck, Hannity and Noory (of Coast to Coast AM), this is not always the case. Some stations, particularly in the larger markets, fill their schedules with local hosts. In some cities, iHeartMedia owns two or three talk stations. The dominant station, such as KFI Los Angeles, KOA Denver, WLW Cincinnati and WHAS Louisville, broadcast a mostly local lineup. Secondary talk stations (KEIB Los Angeles, KDFD and KHOW Denver, WKRC Cincinnati and WKJK Louisville) carry most of the syndicated offerings from Premiere Networks.

Weekend programs heard on some iHeart-owned stations and syndicated by Premiere Networks to other talk stations include At Home with Gary Sullivan, Handel on the Law with Bill Handel, The Weekend with Michael Brown, In the Garden with Ron Wilson, Rich on Tech with Rich DeMuro, The Ben Ferguson Show, Sunday Nights with Bill Cunningham, Somewhere in Time with Art Bell and The Jesus Christ Show with Neil Saavedra. Most are pre-recorded and offered to stations to air anytime on weekends they choose, although Ferguson and Cunningham do their shows live on Sunday evenings. Bell's show is made up of recorded Coast to Coast AM programs from the late 1990s and early 2000s. He died in 2018.

iHeartMedia has been active in the national trend of simulcasting its AM news/talk outlets on full-power FM stations, hoping to preserve their long-term viability while AM radio declines. Examples include Sacramento where KGBY 92.5 became KFBK-FM, simulcasting KFBK 1530 AM. In Salt Lake City, 105.7 KTMY became KNRS-FM, simulcasting KNRS 570 AM. In the Albany-Schenectady-Troy market, WHRL 103.1 became WGY-FM, simulcasting WGY 810 AM. In Birmingham, WVVB 105.5 became WERC-FM, simulcasting WERC 960 AM. In Syracuse, WPHR 106.9 became WSYR-FM, simulcasting WSYR 570 AM.

Some iHeartMedia news/talk stations on the AM dial are also heard on low-power FM translator stations. Even though they are powered at only a few hundred watts, the translators allow some listeners to hear WLAC Nashville, KOA Denver and WFLA Tampa on the FM dial. In Washington D.C., iHeartMedia has a translator-only news/talk station, known as "Freedom 104.7 FM". It is heard on an HD Radio subchannel of WMZQ-FM 98.7. That feeds translator station W284CQ which broadcasts on 104.7 MHz.

==== Progressive talk ====
Progressive talk shows had been heard on a few of iHeartMedia's stations, primarily secondary to its main news/talk stations. These liberal-leaning stations usually featured at least one local host with some syndicated shows, mainly from Westwood One, making up the balance of the broadcast day. Air America Radio also aired on some of these stations. iHeartMedia has shown a tendency to drop liberal talk affiliations due to lack of ratings or advertiser support and replace it with sports talk or other formats. For instance, WCKY Cincinnati, KLSD San Diego, WXKS Boston, KPOJ Portland and WINZ Miami had progressive talk formats that were switched to sports.

In one case this caused a listener protest when iHeartMedia (then Clear Channel) wanted to change WXXM in Madison, Wisconsin, to a sports format. The outcry worked temporarily. WXXM was allowed to keep its liberal-leaning talk format for a few more years. But in November 2016, due to a general lack of syndicated progressive talk programming, WXXM flipped to classic hits.

==== All-News ====
In the all-news radio format, iHeartMedia owns one station that airs continuous locally anchored news around the clock, except for a few hours of talk in the evening, WBZ Boston. A few iHeartMedia stations carry all-news in drive time, such as KFBK Sacramento, KOA Denver and KOGO San Diego. For syndication and on the iHeart app, the company operates the 24/7 News channel through its Total Traffic and Weather Network division. From 2016, the service has co-branded as NBC News Radio after iHeart/TTWN and NBC News formed a brand licensing and content agreement.

==== Black Information Network ====
On June 30, 2020, iHeartMedia announced a new all-news radio brand, the Black Information Network (BIN), which is targeted towards African Americans. BIN is heard on iHeartMedia stations in dozens of cities. WBIN Atlanta is considered the flagship station.

=== Sports talk stations ===
Nearly all sports talk stations owned by iHeartMedia are affiliated with Fox Sports Radio. A few sports talk stations owned by iHeartMedia run programming from rival ESPN Radio. In Cincinnati, iHeart owns two sports stations with WSAI running Fox Sports and WCKY carrying ESPN. In 2020, iHeartMedia launched the iHeartSports Network.

=== Adult standards ===
Most of iHeartMedia's adult standards stations were turnkey operations, running a direct feed of a satellite format such as Westwood One's America's Best Music or Music of Your Life, with no local DJs. The company sold off many of these stations or flipped them to sports or talk formats.

=== Adult contemporary ===
iHeartMedia's Adult contemporary stations are often branded as "Lite FM" (e.g. WLTW New York and WLIT-FM Chicago) or "Sunny" (KODA Houston and KTSM-FM El Paso). A handful of stations use "Magic", "B" or something else similar as their identifiers. As of 2018, "The Breeze" brought a resurgence in Soft AC, targeted towards millennial listeners. In the evening, many iHeartMedia AC stations carry Delilah, a call-in and request show syndicated by Premiere Networks and hosted by Delilah Rene. In some markets, another station has the rights to Delilah, in which case The John Tesh Radio Show is often carried in the evening. Your Weekend with Jim Brickman and The Ellen K Weekend Show are popular weekend syndicated programs on iHeartMedia adult contemporary stations.

Nearly all iHeartMedia AC stations switch to all-Christmas music for much of November and December. Some AC stations are known for playing holiday songs as early as November 1 such as WLIT-FM Chicago. Other iHeartMedia AC stations make the switch each year in early November while WLTW New York waits until the Friday before Thanksgiving.

Hot adult contemporary stations are usually branded as "Mix" (WMMX Dayton), "Star" (KMYI San Diego) or "MYfm" (KBIG Los Angeles). Some Hot AC stations lean toward modern rock while others lean toward adult hits.

=== Contemporary hit radio ===
iHeartMedia's CHR stations share a number of common brands, including "KISS-FM" (e.g., KIIS-FM Los Angeles, WKSC-FM Chicago, WAKS Cleveland, WKFS Cincinnati, WXKS-FM Boston), "Z" (e.g., WHTZ New York, KKRZ Portland, WZFT Baltimore, KSLZ St. Louis), "Wild" (e.g., WLDI West Palm Beach, KYLD San Francisco), "Power" (WWPW Atlanta, WGEX Albany, Georgia), Channel (e.g., WKQI Detroit, KHTS-FM San Diego, WCHD Dayton-Springfield), or "Hot" (e.g., WIHT in Washington, D.C., WWHT in Syracuse, NY). Other brands, less commonly used, includes "Radio Now" (previously used at WNRW Louisville, now rebranded as "98.9 Kiss FM"), "Q" (WIOQ Philadelphia-102.1 FM-Q102, WQGA Waycross-Brunswick, Georgia-103.3 FM-103Q), "B" (WAEB-FM B 104 Allentown-Reading PA 104.1 FM), "FM" (WLAN-FM FM 97 96.9 FM Lancaster-Reading), "V" (WVRT & WVRZ V-97 Williamsport-Lock Haven, Pennsylvania), "Max" (WHCY Max 106.3 Sussex), "K.C." (WKCI-FM KC 101, 101.3 FM, Hamden, Connecticut) and "X" (WJMX-FM 103X, 103.3 FM Cheraw, South Carolina).

Although a majority of these stations features a broad-based, mass appeal music presentation, several stations like KPRR El Paso and WKTU New York program more rhythmic material. WKTU has a sister station in WHTZ, so WKTU's playlist includes more rhythmic hits to differentiate itself from Z100.

=== Country music ===
Country music stations owned by iHeartMedia often call themselves "The Bull" (WUBL Atlanta and KSD-FM St. Louis) and "Big" (WSIX-FM Nashville) as national brandings. They almost universally carry After MidNite with Granger Smith, a syndicated overnight program. Many also carry The Bobby Bones Show in morning drive time, based at WSIX-FM Nashville. (Some iHeartMedia country stations with popular local morning shows run Bobby Bones in the evening or weekends.)

In 2015, iHeartMedia launched the iHeartCountry franchise, including the iHeartRadio Country Festival. The Festival is a popular live music concert held each year and recorded for television.

=== Classic Hits/Oldies ===
iHeartMedia's Classic Hits stations consists largely of FM stations with some AM stations. iHeartMedia uses brands such as "Big" and "Kool" on many of its stations. Nearly all of the FM stations play classic hits spanning from the late 1970s to the 1990s with a primary focus on the 1980s, with a 500-song active playlist. These stations generally have a few local live announcers; much of the time these stations are voicetracked either locally or from another market. Many air the in house syndicated 'The 80s Show' with Jeff Stevens on Saturday evenings and many air Casey Kasem's American Top 40 from the 1970s and 1980s.

The AM oldies stations' playlists skew somewhat older and span from 1955 to about 1975. About 60 percent of the time they play 1964 to 1969 oldies, 20 percent pre 1964 oldies, and 20 percent music from the 1970s. Some of the AM stations also run adult standards several hours on the weekend as well as limited specialized programming focusing on the pre 1964 era. Most of the AM stations are in smaller markets.

=== Rock ===
iHeartMedia stations programming a rock format tend to play a blend of new rock and harder classic rock. Some carry Nights with Alice Cooper (out of KSLX-FM in Phoenix) in the evenings while some others aired Sixx Sense with Nikki Sixx until the show ended at the end of 2015. These stations tend to be live during the day and voicetracked at night. Some stations run Rockline with Bob Coburn and/or Little Steven's Underground Garage as well.

While iHeartMedia classic rock stations operate under a wide variety of monikers, many are branded as "The Fox" or "The Brew". Often, these stations will carry Bob and Tom (out of WFBQ in Indianapolis) in morning drive. In the Southern United States, John Boy and Billy (out of WRFX in Charlotte) is carried instead in most cases. (Both of the aforementioned shows are syndicated by Premiere.) Other shows include Rover's Morning Glory out of WMMS in Cleveland. Starting with WQBW Milwaukee (now the sports formatted WRNW) and WBWR Columbus (now WXZX), several iHeartMedia stations have adopted a 1980s-centered classic rock approach called "The Brew".

The company's alternative rock stations use a standardized branding under the brand "Alt".

=== Spanish ===
In a few markets, iHeartMedia has an FM station carrying Hispanic programming full-time. In some markets the format is a Contemporary Tropical format while in others the format carried is more of a Mexican format. In a few markets an iHeartMedia FM station carries a rap based Spanish format known as Hurban, which blends Spanish dance music with rhythm and blues hits as well as some Hip Hop. The division was run by Spanish radio executive Alfredo Alonso, who joined the company in September 2004 as senior vice president of Hispanic Radio. In September 2016, iHeartMedia brought hired Enrique Santos as chairman and chief creative officer of the newly formed iHeartLatino division.

iHeartMedia launched an annual event franchise called iHeartRadio Fiesta Latina.

=== Religious ===
In a few markets, iHeartMedia has a religious station on the AM band. Some of these sell blocks of time to outside organizations and have no local shows at all except where local churches buy time. These are formatted similarly to Salem Media stations.

The other type of religious format iHeartMedia uses in a few markets is a Gospel music based format. On these stations, Gospel Music appealing to black Americans airs most of the time, along with some block programming sold to religious groups. These stations are often programmed as urban stations that happen to be religious.

=== Specialties ===
IHeartMedia has one station in Hawaii, KDNN/Honolulu, programming a Contemporary Hawaiian Hits/Reggae format, along with an accompanying HD2 sub channel that features traditional Hawaiian music. Multicultural programming can also be heard on AM stations that iHeartMedia owns or has LMAs with. In March 2019, its Allentown, Pennsylvania outlet, WSAN, launched an all-podcast format. In November 2019, K256AS/KUCD-HD2 in Honolulu launched a variant Top 40 format with a focus on K-pop and other international pop hits.

== Criticism ==
=== Market share ===
In the late 1990s and early 2000s, the company became an object of persistent criticism. FCC regulations were relaxed following the Telecommunications Act of 1996, allowing companies to own far more radio stations than before. After spending about $30 billion, Clear Channel owned over 1,200 stations nationwide, including as many as eight stations in certain markets. Although "media reform" social movement organizations like Future of Music Coalition mobilized against Clear Channel, so far the company has been able to hold on to all of its stations after divesting a few following the acquisition of AMFM, although over 500 stations have since been sold or are in the process of being sold since the company announced plans to become privately held.

=== September 11, 2001 ===
Following the September 11 attacks on New York and The Pentagon, radio stations circulated a list of songs that were deemed inappropriate for broadcast during the time of national mourning following the attacks. A small list was initially generated by the Clear Channel office on Thursday, September 13, 2001, though individual program directors added many of their own songs. A list containing about 150 songs was soon published on the Internet. Some critics suggested that Clear Channel's political preferences played a part in the list. A number of songs were apparently placed on the list because they had specific words such as "plane", "fly", "burn", and "falling" in their titles. Clear Channel denies that this was a list of banned songs, claiming it was a list of titles that should be played only after great thought. Also WOFX, Cincinnati, owned by Clear Channel at the time continued to play songs that were on the alleged list, even though radio headquarters was in Cincinnati at the time. Songs on the list included Tom Petty's "Free Fallin'", Louis Armstrong's "What a Wonderful World", System of a Down's signature song, Chop Suey!, and the entire discography of Rage Against The Machine.

=== Live music recordings ===
In 2004, Clear Channel acquired a key patent in the process of producing Instant Live recordings, in which a live performance is recorded directly from the sound engineer's console during the show, and then rapidly burned on CD so that audience members can buy copies of the show as they are leaving the venue. This had been intended to provide additional revenue to the artist, venue, and promoter, as well as stifle the demand for unauthorized bootleg concert recordings made by audience members. However, some media critics, as well as smaller business rivals, believed that Clear Channel was using the patent (on the process of adding cues to the beginning and ending of tracks during recording, so that the concert is not burned as a single enormous track) to drive competitors out of business or force them to pay licensing fees, even if they do not use precisely the same process. The patent was transferred to Live Nation when Clear Channel Entertainment was spun off, but the patent was revoked on March 13, 2007, after it was found that this patent infringed on a prior patent granted for Telex.

=== Indecency zero tolerance ===
During the nationwide crackdown on indecent material following the Super Bowl XXXVIII halftime show in 2004, Clear Channel launched a "self-policing" effort, and declared that there would be no "indecent" material allowed on the air. This led to the company's dismissal of several of their own employees, including popular and high-profile hosts in a number of cities. There were protests from free-speech advocates. During the same period, Howard Stern was dropped from six Clear Channel-owned stations in Florida, California, Pennsylvania, New York and Kentucky. By mid-year, rival Viacom (through radio division Infinity Broadcasting, and the original Viacom, not the second one) brought Stern's show back to those six markets. In June 2004, Viacom/Infinity Broadcasting Inc./One Twelve Inc. filed a $10 million lawsuit against Clear Channel for breaking of contracts and non-payment of licensing fees due to the dropping of Stern's show. (Viacom was Howard Stern's employer at the time, though he has since moved to SiriusXM.) The following July, Clear Channel filed a countersuit of $3 million.

=== Concerts ===
In the early 2000s, Clear Channel settled a lawsuit with a Denver, Colorado concert promoter, Nobody In Particular Presents (NIPP). In the lawsuit, NIPP alleged that Clear Channel halted airplay on its local stations for (NIPP) clients, and that Clear Channel would not allow NIPP to publicize its concerts on the air. The lawsuit was settled in 2004 when Clear Channel agreed to pay NIPP a confidential sum. However, a systematic analysis of concert ticket prices found no evidence that Clear Channel was cross-leveraging its radio interests with its (now divested) concert promotion interests.

=== Production of local programming ===
iHeartMedia uses the RCS Nex-Gen automation system throughout their properties. Like most contemporary automation systems, Nex-Gen allows a DJ from anywhere in the country to sound as if they are broadcasting from anywhere else in the country, on any other station. A technological outgrowth of earlier, tape-based automation systems dating back to the 1960s, this method—known as voice-tracking—allows for smaller market stations to be partially or completely staffed by "cyber-jocks" who may never have visited the town from which they are broadcasting. This practice may also result in local on-air positions being reduced or eliminated. It has been stated that iHeartMedia maintains a majority of its staff in hourly-paid, part-time positions. Beginning in the early 2020s, many of its stations have added a disclaimer with their station identification sequence noting that the voicetracked content is pre-recorded.

=== Lack of local staff during emergency ===
Clear Channel was criticized for a situation that occurred in Minot, North Dakota, on the morning of January 18, 2002. At around 2:30 a.m., a Canadian Pacific Railway train derailed and leaked 240,000 US gallons (910,000 L) of toxic anhydrous ammonia, releasing a cloud of caustic, poisonous gas over the city. At the time, Clear Channel owned six commercial radio stations out of nine in the Minot area. City officials attempted to contact the local Clear Channel office by telephone to spread warnings of the danger using its radio stations, but it was several critical hours before the station manager was finally reached at his home. In the meantime, 9-1-1 operators were advising panicked callers to tune to KCJB for emergency instructions, but the station was not broadcasting any such information.

The ammonia spill was the largest of its kind in the United States, with one person killed, and over 1,000 seeking medical attention. Clear Channel claimed no responsibility for its failure to warn residents, maintaining that the city should have used the Emergency Alert System to trigger automatic equipment in place at all U.S. radio stations. The EAS equipment was later found to be functional at the time, but had not been activated by city, state or regional authorities. Other critical systems throughout Minot were either inoperable or had failed, including the public siren system, electricity in parts of the town, and the 9-1-1 telephone system, which became overloaded.

=== Rejection of advertising images ===
Clear Channel Outdoor rejected the two images on the left.

In June 2010, Clear Channel Outdoor rejected without comment two digital billboard images submitted by St. Pete Pride, an LGBT organization that sponsors gay pride events in the St. Petersburg, Florida area, leading the group to cancel its contract with Clear Channel. St. Pete Pride has stated that throughout its eight-year history, Clear Channel has edited the organization's advertising material, and questioned whether the rejection of these images were because they displayed same-sex couples in affectionate poses. A Clear Channel spokesperson declined to comment on the specific reasons why the images were rejected but denied that the affection being shown was an issue, saying that such images had been included in previous St. Pete Pride campaigns.

=== Censorship ===
iHeartMedia and its subsidiaries have been associated with censorship of state and federal candidates for public office, elected officials and various political viewpoints.

iHeartMedia has been criticized in the past for censoring opinions critical of the Republican Party. Magic, the 2007 release from Bruce Springsteen which contained songs that were subtly critical of then-president George W. Bush, a Republican, and his administration, was censored from air play on Clear Channel. After Natalie Maines, the singer of the country band Dixie Chicks, told a London audience that they were "ashamed [of the fact that] the president of the United States is from Texas", the band's radio airplay dropped precipitously. Afterwards, some iHeartMedia (then Clear Channel) stations removed The Dixie Chicks from their playlists without any noted repercussions from the company. Gail Austin, Clear Channel's director of programming said, "Out of respect for our troops, our city and our listeners, [we] have taken the Dixie Chicks off our playlists." Clear Channel was accused of orchestrating the radio blacklist by such critics as Paul Krugman; however, others claim some Clear Channel stations continued to play the band longer than some other companies.

In 2005, Clear Channel-owned KTVX was the only local television station in Salt Lake City that refused to air a paid political message of Cindy Sheehan against the war in Iraq during a visit by President Bush.

On May 8, 2014, the FCC was asked to respond to a political programming complaint made against an iHeartMedia owned broadcast licensee, Capstar TX LLC by supporters of Milwaukee mayor Tom Barrett, that year's Democratic candidate for Governor of Wisconsin. Capstar would not offer free airtime on WISN radio (a station which only features local and national conservative talk shows) to respond to statements supporting Republican Governor Scott Walker. Walker's supporters had received free airtime from WISN for political purposes. Barrett supporters based their complaint on WISN's violation of the Zapple doctrine. The FCC responded by rescinding the Zapple doctrine as a no longer enforceable component of the Fairness Doctrine.

=== Use of paid actors posing as callers ===
iHeartMedia, through its subsidiary, Premiere Radio Networks, auditions and hires actors to call in to talk radio shows and pose as listeners in order to provide shows, carried by iHeartMedia and other broadcasters, with planned content in the form of stories and opinions. The custom caller service provided by Premiere Radio assures its clients they won't hear the same actor's voice for at least two months in order to appear authentic to listeners who might otherwise catch on.

=== iHeartMedia and rock radio ===
iHeartMedia had ended several long-running rock formats in several markets due to the decline of the format and shifts in overall market demographics, to negative listener reception, including:

- KSJO San Jose (formerly an iHeart station) – flipped to Spanish-language oldies on October 28, 2004, after 35 years as a rock station
- KLOL Houston – flipped to Spanish-language pop on November 12, 2004, after 34 years as a rock station (the station was sold to CBS Radio a few years later)
- WFNX Boston – flipped to adult hits on July 24, 2012, after 29 years as an alternative rock station
- WKLS Atlanta – flipped to mainstream top 40 on August 29, 2012, after 38 years as a rock station
- KZEP-FM San Antonio – flipped to rhythmic hot AC (adult contemporary) on August 8, 2014, after 25 years as a classic rock station and 45 years of some form of rock music on the frequency (the classic rock format was moved to low-powered translator K227BH)
- KDGE Dallas–Fort Worth – flipped to Christmas music on November 16, 2016, then Mainstream AC on December 26 after 27 years (11 years on 94.5 before moving to 102.1 in 2000, and 16 years on 102.1) as an alternative rock station.

== See also ==
- iHeartMedia radio stations
- Clear Channel UK
- List of radio stations owned by iHeartMedia
- List of songs deemed inappropriate by Clear Channel following the September 11, 2001 attacks
- TuneIn
