= Stone Oak, San Antonio =

Neighborhood of San Antonio, Texas, United States

Stone Oak is a master planned district in north central San Antonio, Texas, United States. It was established in 1985 and is located north of Loop 1604, south of Wilderness Oak, east of Blanco Road and west of U.S. 281.
