= 99.1 FM =

FM radio frequency

The following radio stations broadcast on FM frequency 99.1 MHz:

== Argentina ==
- Avance in Rosario, Santa Fe
- Beat in Gualeguaychú, Entre Ríos
- ComunicArte in López, Santa Fe
- Del Paraná in Ramallo, Buenos Aires
- La 99.1 in La Plata, Buenos Aires
- LRI743 in Monje, Santa Fe
- Pop in Balcarce, Buenos Aires
- Radio María in General Villegas, Buenos Aires
- Radio María in Federal, Entre Ríos
- Uno in Chabás, Santa Fe
- Urbana in 25 de Mayo, Buenos Aires

== Australia ==
- Raw FM (Australian radio network) in Gosford, New South Wales
- Radio National in Longreach, Queensland
- Goldfields FM in Maryborough, Victoria
- Smart FM in Swan Hill, Victoria
- 3VYV in Melbourne, Victoria
- 5ADL in Adelaide, South Australia

== Brazil ==
- Cidade 99 (ZYC 411) in Fortaleza, Ceará

== Canada (Channel 256) ==
- CBLA-FM in Toronto, Ontario
- CBNS-FM in St. Alban's, Newfoundland and Labrador
- CBR-1-FM in Calgary, Alberta
- CBXB-FM in Burns Lake, British Columbia
- CFMM-FM in Prince Albert, Saskatchewan
- CFNJ-FM in St-Gabriel-de-Brandon, Quebec
- CFPG-FM in Winnipeg, Manitoba
- CHNC-FM-1 in Carleton, Quebec
- CHRI-FM in Ottawa, Ontario
- CHTK-FM in Prince Rupert, British Columbia
- CICR-FM in Parrsboro, Nova Scotia
- CIDI-FM in Lac-Brome, Quebec
- CIPC-FM in Port-Cartier, Quebec
- CITA-FM-2 in Amherst, Nova Scotia
- CJAM-FM in Windsor, Ontario
- CJDR-FM in Fernie, British Columbia
- CJMM-FM in Rouyn, Quebec
- CJSB-FM-2 in Benito, Manitoba
- CKFW-FM in Sorrell Lake, Ontario
- CKIX-FM in St. John's, Newfoundland and Labrador
- CKPL-FM in Peachland, British Columbia
- CKXS-FM in Wallaceburg, Ontario
- VF2050 in Labrador City, Newfoundland and Labrador
- VF2346 in Logan Lake, British Columbia

== China (mainland) ==
- CNR Music Radio in Hohhot
- CNR The Voice of China in Changchun, Guang'an, Huainan and Zhuhai

== Costa Rica ==
- TIAAC at San Jose

== Indonesia ==
- Delta FM in Jakarta, Indonesia

== Korea (Republic of) ==
- MBC FM4U in Jeonju, Jeollabukdo
- KBS 1FM in Jeju

== Macau ==
- Transfers CNR The Voice of China

== Malaysia ==
- Mix in Johor Bahru, Johor and Singapore

== Mexico ==
- XHBCP-FM in La Paz, Baja California Sur (6 additional transmitters on 99.1)
- XHED-FM in Ameca, Jalisco
- XHEPR-FM in Ciudad Juárez (El Porvenir), Chihuahua
- XHEPT-FM in Misantla, Veracruz
- XHMOM-FM in Morelia, Michoacán
- XHMOR-FM in Yautepec, Morelos
- XHNZI-FM in Nacozari, Sonora
- XHPGAN-FM in Apatzingán, Michoacán
- XHPTEC-FM in San Sebastián Tecomaxtlahuaca-Santiago Juxtlahuaca, Oaxaca
- XHSL-FM in Piedras Negras, Coahuila
- XHTEU-FM in Tehuacán, Puebla
- XHTMJ-FM in Tepatitlán de Morelos, Jalisco
- XHUI-FM in Comitán de Dominguez, Chiapas
- XHVHT-FM in Villahermosa (Miguel Hidalgo Primera Sección), Tabasco
- XHVI-FM in San Juan del Río, Querétaro

== Philippines ==
- DWAM in Batangas City
- DWGV-FM in Angeles City
- DWYN in Naga City
- DYBM in Bacolod City
- DYXY in Tacloban City
- DXVM-FM in Cagayan De Oro City
- DXRT in General Santos City

== Turkey ==
- Radyo 3 in Izmir

== United States (Channel 256) ==
- KAGB in Waimea, Hawaii
- KARA in Williams, California
- KBUU-LP in Malibu, California
- KCAD in Dickinson, North Dakota
- KCLV-FM in Clovis, New Mexico
- KCMM in Belgrade, Montana
- KDEA-LP in Delta, Colorado
- KDWD in Marceline, Missouri
- KFZO in Denton, Texas
- KEEZ in Mankato, Minnesota
- KEWT-LP in Weslaco, Texas
- KFAH in Pineland, Texas
- KFEP-LP in Los Angeles, California
- KFMM in Virden, New Mexico
- KGGI in Riverside, California
- KGLS-LP in Tillamook, Oregon
- KGLX in Gallup, New Mexico
- KGUS-LP in Gunnison, Colorado
- KHJS-LP in San Antonio, Texas
- KHKX in Odessa, Texas
- KILB-LP in Paron, Arkansas
- KILN-LP in Alturas, California
- KJBU-LP in Oxnard, California
- KJIL in Copeland, Kansas
- KJNY in Ferndale, California
- KKFT in Gardnerville-Minden, Nevada
- KLBP-LP in Long Beach, California
- KLCT-LP in Lubbock, Texas
- KLDB-LP in Los Angeles, California
- KLJY in Clayton, Missouri
- KLLZ in Walker, Minnesota
- KLTO in Moody, Texas
- KMA-FM in Clarinda, Iowa
- KMAG (FM) in Fort Smith, Arkansas
- KMGR in Nephi, Utah
- KMTE-LP in Montrose, Colorado
- KMTS in Glenwood Springs, Colorado
- KNES in Fairfield, Texas
- KNNA-FM in Nenana, Alaska
- KNUL in Nulato, Alaska
- KNYN in Fort Bridger, Wyoming
- KODA in Houston, Texas
- KODZ in Eugene, Oregon
- KOFH in Nogales, Arizona
- KORE-LP in Entiat, Washington
- KPJT-LP in Maple Grove, Minnesota
- KPRP-LP in Portland, Oregon
- KQJN-LP in Doniphan, Missouri
- KRUP in Dillingham, Alaska
- KRYS in Corpus Christi, Texas
- KRZS in Pangburn, Arkansas
- KSEK in Girard, Kansas
- KSKB in Brooklyn, Iowa
- KSOO-FM in Lennox, South Dakota
- KSQL in Santa Cruz, California
- KTDT-LP in Tucson, Arizona
- KTLI in El Dorado, Kansas
- KTMG in Prescott, Arizona
- KTPC-LP in Venice, California
- KTYU in Tanana, Alaska
- KUAD in Windsor, Colorado
- KUJ in Burbank, Washington
- KUPI in Idaho Falls, Idaho
- KVMZ in Waldo, Arkansas
- KWSV-LP in Simi Valley, California
- KWYW in Lost Cabin, Wyoming
- KXFM in Santa Maria, California
- KXKC in New Iberia, Louisiana
- KXLG in Huron, South Dakota
- KXMT in Taos, New Mexico
- KXTA-FM in Gooding, Idaho
- KXVX-LP in Sulphur Springs, Texas
- KYOO-FM in Half Way, Missouri
- KZAH in Harper, Texas
- KZUT-LP in Los Angeles, California
- WAAL in Binghamton, New York
- WAHR in Huntsville, Alabama
- WASQ-LP in Statesville, North Carolina
- WAUP-LP in Waupaca, Wisconsin
- WAWZ in Zarephath, New Jersey
- WBFE in Bar Harbor, Maine
- WBGN in Beaver Dam, Kentucky
- WBWG-LP in Idamay, West Virginia
- WCBL in Benton, Kentucky
- WCFY-LP in Evansville, Indiana
- WDCH-FM in Bowie, Maryland
- WDEN in Macon, Georgia
- WDJY-LP in Dallas, Georgia
- WDUQ-LP in Benwood, West Virginia
- WDZD-LP in Monroe, North Carolina
- WEDR in Miami, Florida
- WEVB-LP in Hazleton, Pennsylvania
- WFMK in East Lansing, Michigan
- WFRO in Fremont, Ohio
- WGGE in Parkersburg, West Virginia
- WGRU-LP in Riverdale, Georgia
- WHBJ in Barnwell, South Carolina
- WHKO in Dayton, Ohio
- WHSX in Edmonton, Kentucky
- WIDE-LP in Madison, Wisconsin
- WIEH-LP in Marietta, Georgia
- WIKB in Iron River, Michigan
- WIUX-LP in Bloomington, Indiana
- WJMM in Keene, Kentucky
- WJNV in Jonesville, Virginia
- WKCG-LP in Dothan, Alabama
- WKFX in Rice Lake, Wisconsin
- WKNN in Pascagoula, Mississippi
- WLXQ in Greensboro, Alabama
- WMYX in Milwaukee, Wisconsin
- WNAP-LP in Muncie, Indiana
- WNML-FM in Friendsville, Tennessee
- WNNH in Henniker, New Hampshire
- WPLM in Plymouth, Massachusetts
- WPLR in New Haven, Connecticut
- WPRM-FM in San Juan, Puerto Rico
- WQEE-LP in Newnan, Georgia
- WQIK in Jacksonville, Florida
- WQRT-LP in Indianapolis, Indiana
- WRKW in Ebensburg, Pennsylvania
- WRWS-LP in Daytona Beach, Florida
- WSLQ in Roanoke, Virginia
- WSMK in Buchanan, Michigan
- WUJM-LP in St. Petersburg, Florida
- WVIC-LP in Saint Paul, Minnesota
- WVOD in Manteo, North Carolina
- WVVD-LP in Seffner, Florida
- WWOJ in Avon Park, Florida
- WWSX-LP in Rehoboth Beach, Delaware
- WXDR-LP in New Orleans, Louisiana
- WXGM in Gloucester, Virginia
- WXNW-LP in Seven Oaks, South Carolina
- WYKC in Whitefield, New Hampshire
- WYMX in Greenwood, Mississippi
- WYXY in Savoy, Illinois
- WZFX in Whiteville, North Carolina
- WZQC-LP in Cicero, Illinois
