= List of radio stations in Morelos =

This is a list of radio stations in the state of Morelos, Mexico.

Radio stations in Morelos
Call sign	Frequency	Location	Owner	Name	Format
XECSAA-AM	810 AM	Cuernavaca	Instituto Michoacano de Radiodifusión, A.C.	—	—
XEJOEP-AM	1190 AM	Cuernavaca–Jojutla	Escápate al Paraíso, S.A. de C.V.	—	—
XECTAM-AM	1390 AM	Cuautla	Government of the State of Morelos	Universal Sónica	Public radio
XHCM-FM	88.5 FM	Cuernavaca	Radio Electrónica Mexicana, S.A.	Buenisiima	Regional Mexican
XHART-FM	89.3 FM	Zacatepec	Araceli Rojas Tenorio	Radio Señal	Regional Mexican
XHCUM-FM	89.7 FM	Cuautla	Universidad Autónoma del Estado de Morelos	Radio UAEM	University
XHJPA-FM	90.3 FM	Jojutla	Radio Unión, S.A. de C.V.	Stereo Vida	Adult contemporary
XHYTEM-FM	90.9 FM	Yautepec de Zaragoza	Government of the State of Morelos	Universal Sónica	Public radio
XHSCIX-FM (Note: Was XHRTPZ-FM until 2022)	92.3 FM	Tepoztlán	Teponaztle, Cultura y Comunicación, A.C.	Radio Tepoztlán	Community radio
XHTB-FM	93.3 FM	Cuernavaca	Estereópolis, S.A. de C.V.	Arroba FM	Contemporary hit radio
XHFCSM-FM	94.1 FM	Cuernavaca	Fundación Cultural para la Sociedad Mexicana, A.C.	Radio María	Catholic
XHSW-FM	94.9 FM	Cuernavaca	XHSW-FM, S.A. de C.V.	La Más Picuda	Regional Mexican
XHCT-FM	95.7 FM	Cuernavaca	Stereorey México, S.A.	Exa FM	Contemporary hit radio
XHJMG-FM	96.5 FM	Cuernavaca	Radio Difusoras de Morelos, S.A. de C.V.	Los 40	Contemporary hit radio
XHVZ-FM	97.3 FM	Cuernavaca	Stereorey México, S.A.	La Mejor	Regional Mexican
XHNG-FM	98.1 FM	Cuernavaca	Radio Nova, S.A. de C.V.	Súper	Contemporary hit radio
XHMOR-FM	99.1 FM	Yautepec de Zaragoza	Radio XHMOR, S.A. de C.V.	La 99	Contemporary hit radio
XHTIX-FM	100.1 FM	Temixco	Corporación Radiológico, S.A. de C.V.	W Radio Morelos	News/talk
XHJLAM-FM	100.5 FM	Jojutla	Government of the State of Morelos	Universal Sónica	Public radio
XHSCCS-FM	101.1 FM	Cuernavaca	Espacio Siembra Ideas Construye Esperanzas, A.C.	—	Community radio
XHCUT-FM	101.7 FM	Cuautla	Radio de Cuautla, S.A. de C.V.	La Comadre	Regional Mexican
XHSCJH-FM	102.3 FM	Axochiapan	La Raza de Morelos, A.C.	La Raza	Community radio
XHVACM-FM	102.9 FM	Cuernavaca	Government of the State of Morelos	Universal Sónica	Public radio
XHCU-FM	104.5 FM	Cuautla	XHCU-FM, S.A. de C.V.	La Bestia Grupera	Regional Mexican
XHCMR-FM	105.3 FM	Cuautla	Telecomunicaciones CH, S.A. de C.V.	Ke Buena	Regional Mexican
XHUAEM-FM	106.1 FM	Cuernavaca	Universidad Autónoma del Estado de Morelos	Radio UAEM	University
XHCVC-FM	106.9 FM	Cuernavaca	Transmisora Regional Radio Fórmula, S.A. de C.V.	Radio Fórmula	News/talk
XHASM-FM	107.7 FM	Ahuatepec–Cuernavaca	Negocios Modernos, S.A. de C.V.	Éxtasis Digital	English classic hits

== Defunct stations ==
- XHJJM-FM 91.9, Jojutla
