= WXRG (disambiguation) =

WXRG may refer to the following broadcasting stations in the United States:

- WGBL, a radio station (96.7 FM) licensed to Gulfport, Mississippi, which held the call sign WXRG from 1993 to 1997
- WXYK (FM), a radio station (105.9 FM) licensed to Pascagoula, Mississippi, which held the call sign WXRG from 1997 to 2006
- WYKC, a radio station (99.1 FM) licensed to Whitefield, New Hampshire, which held the call sign WXRG from 2007 to 2008
- WKMY (FM), a radio station (99.9 FM) licensed to Athol, Massachusetts, which held the call sign WXRG from 2008 to 2013
- WAKC, a radio station (102.3 FM) licensed to Concord, New Hampshire, which held the call sign WXRG from 2016 to 2021
