= WTNM =

- Courtland, Mississippi; United States
- Broadcast area: Oxford, Mississippi; Senatobia, Mississippi; Hernando, Mississippi; Memphis, Tennessee
- Frequency: 93.7 MHz
- Branding: Super Talk Mississippi

Programming
- Language: English
- Format: News/Talk

Ownership
- Owner: Supertalk Mississippi; (Telesouth Communications, Inc.)
- Sister stations: WLAU, WCNA, WQLJ

History
- First air date: 1985 (as WKLJ at 107.1)
- Former call signs: WKLJ (1985–1992); WQLJ (1992–2015)
- Former frequencies: 107.1 MHz (1985–1993)
- Call sign meaning: W Talk News Mississippi or W TeNnessee Memphis (broadcast city)

Technical information
- Licensing authority: FCC
- Facility ID: 51086
- Class: C3
- ERP: 11,000 watts
- HAAT: 151 meters (495 ft)
- Transmitter coordinates: 34°27′56″N 89°57′00″W

Links
- Public license information: Public file; LMS
- Webcast: Listen Live
- Website: Supertalk North Mississippi 93.7

Previous logo of WTNM

WTNM (93.7 FM, "Super Talk Mississippi") is an American radio station licensed to serve the community of Courtland, Mississippi. The station, established in 1985 as "WKLJ", is operated by Supertalk Mississippi and the WTNM broadcast license is held by Telesouth Communications, Inc.

WTNM broadcasts a news/talk format to the Oxford and Batesville, Mississippi, area.

The station was assigned the call sign "WQLJ" by the Federal Communications Commission (FCC) on June 16, 1992.

On May 28, 2015, WQLJ changed their format to news/talk, branded as "Super Talk Mississippi" (swapping formats with WTNM 105.5 FM Water Valley, MS). On June 4, 2015, the two stations also swapped call signs, with WQLJ taking on its current WTNM.
