= WGCM =

WGCM may refer to:

- WGCM (AM), a radio station (1240 AM) licensed to Gulfport, Mississippi, United States
- WGCM-FM, a radio station (102.3 FM) licensed to Gulfport, Mississippi, United States
