= WLGF =

Coordinates: 30.459°N 89.079°W

- Gulfport, Mississippi; United States
- Broadcast area: Gulfport-Biloxi-Pascagoula, Mississippi
- Frequency: 107.1 MHz
- Branding: K-Love

Programming
- Format: Contemporary Christian

Ownership
- Owner: Educational Media Foundation

History
- First air date: 1964 (as WROA-FM)
- Former call signs: WROA-FM (1965–1980); WZKX (1980–1987); WXLS (1987–1989); WXLS-FM (1989–1997); WXYK (1997–2019)

Technical information
- Licensing authority: FCC
- Facility ID: 37096
- Class: A
- ERP: 2,800 watts
- HAAT: 122 meters (400 feet)

Links
- Public license information: Public file; LMS
- Webcast: Listen Live
- Website: klove.com

WLGF (107.1 FM) is a radio station located in Gulfport, Mississippi, broadcasting a contemporary Christian format under the national K-Love radio network. WLGF is owned by Educational Media Foundation and its signal covers areas in Gulfport-Biloxi area.

== History ==
=== WROA-FM/Power 107/Surf 107 ===
The station first signed on the air in 1964 as WROA-FM, co-owned with WROA (1390 AM). In the early 1980s, the station was called WZKX. In 1987, the owner of the station switched from the 107.1 signal to the 107.9 signal because the 107.9 range was a stronger signal. The WZKX calls were applied to 107.9. 107.1 took the name WXLS and played adult contemporary music as "Lite Rock 107" and later "Surf 107".

=== Kiss 107/107.1 The Monkey ===
On February 14, 1997, WXYK "Kiss 105.9", the market's premier CHR/Top 40 station moved to 107.1 as "Kiss 107, Today's Hottest Music" featuring market vet Patty Steele in mornings, Dave Allen for middays, Matt Austin hosting afternoons and Hurricane Kelly for nights.

On September 18, 1998, after over a year of struggling to achieve ratings success, Kiss 107 relaunched as "107-1 The Monkey, Party Music For Humans" and featured more of a dance lean than a typical top 40. The Monkey debuted with market vet "Collin "The Reverend" Powell hosting "The Morning Zoo", Kyle Curley in Middays, Scot Fox in afternoons and current Program Director, Lucas, hosting nights. The station immediately garnered successful ratings, and in 2000 was named "Mississippi Radio Station Of The Year."

In June 2003, WXYK added nationally syndicated The Kidd Kraddick Morning Show to mornings.

In July 2014, station owner, Triad Broadcasting was sold to Alpha Media along with sister stations, WCPR, WGBL, WQBB and WTNI.

In December 2018, it was announced Alpha Media would be selling its Gulf Coast cluster to local Mississippi broadcast company, Telesouth Communications, who already owns WOSM, the SuperTalk Mississippi affiliate in the Biloxi market. To comply with FCC ownership rules, WXYK was spun off to another local company, Port Broadcasting. The FCC approved the sale on February 12, 2019, and closed on March 1, 2019.

=== K-Love ===
At midnight on February 28, 2019, after playing "Now Or Never" by Halsey, WXYK's programming moved to sister station Bob 105-9 as "105.9 The Monkey" replacing that station's variety hits format and ending its 22-year run on 107.1 FM. The station was also assigned new call letters, WLGF.

For the next 24 hours, the station began stunting with various announcements alerting listeners of the change and to switch over to 105.9 FM before officially changing formats to contemporary Christian under Educational Media Foundation's K-Love network at midnight on March 1 Via a local marketing agreement.

On June 7, 2019, it was announced that Port Broadcasting officially sold WLGF to Educational Media Foundation. The sale, at a price of $362,000, was consummated on July 31, 2019
