= WXYK =

WXYK may refer to:

- WXYK (FM), a radio station (105.9 FM) licensed to serve Pascagoula, Mississippi, United States
- WLGF, a radio station (107.1 FM) licensed to serve Gulfport, Mississippi, which held the call sign WXYK from 1997 to 2019
