= WSWG (AM) =

- Greenwood, Mississippi; United States
- Frequency: 1540 kHz

Programming
- Format: Country music

Ownership
- Owner: Charles Saunders; (Leflore Broadcasting Co.)

History
- First air date: August 30, 1963
- Last air date: 1984
- Former call signs: WLEF (1963–1971)

Technical information
- Power: 1,000 watts
- Transmitter coordinates: 33°31′12″N 90°8′27.6″W

WSWG was a radio station that broadcast on 1540 kHz in Greenwood, Mississippi, United States. It operated from 1963 to 1984, having been denied a renewal of its license by the Federal Communications Commission (FCC) over a 1971 format change that included the firing of three Black disc jockeys, accompanied by other deficiencies in representations made by owner Charles Saunders to the FCC.

== History ==
=== Early years ===
William E. "Bill" Hardy was granted a construction permit for a new radio station on 1540 kHz in Greenwood, Mississippi, to operate with 500 watts during daytime hours only, on January 29, 1963. The station went on air as WLEF—call letters representing Leflore County—and formally opened on August 30 of that year. The transmitter was located at Highland and Ione streets, with studios in the Wright Building downtown. In 1966, Kathleen Stutts acquired WLEF from Hardy, who was selling due to his ill health, for $71,000. During this time, the station aired a primary R&B format and was oriented toward a Black audience. It also increased its power to 1,000 watts in 1967.

=== Saunders ownership and license renewal fight ===
WLEF was sold to the Leflore Broadcasting Company, owned by Charles Saunders, in 1969; Saunders already owned WSWG-FM 99.1. On May 1, 1971, WLEF became WSWG and began simulcasting programming with its FM sister station, relocating to its studios. However, this proved to be a decision that would have repercussions well beyond a consolidation of a daytime-only AM outlet with an FM station. WSWG's country music format appealed to more white audiences, which led to the firing of several Black employees that had worked with the former WLEF. The existing WLEF format was retained on the AM frequency only on Sundays. In April 1971, shortly before the consolidation took place, the Greenwood Movement—which included three of the fired staffers—petitioned the Federal Communications Commission (FCC) for an investigation of racially discriminatory employment practices. However, the FCC failed to take any action on the petition, prompting the group to seek remedy in appeals court. In October 1972, the FCC acted. It ordered Leflore Broadcasting Company to file an early application for renewal of its license by November 1, citing substantial questions about the firm's qualifications.

After processing the license renewal applications for the AM and FM stations (the latter having been filed on a normal term in early 1973), the FCC designated both for hearing in April 1974. Issues the commission raised included the nature of the 1971 format change and whether it went against promises Leflore Broadcasting had made in its 1970 license renewal application; potential misrepresentations to the FCC; and racial discrimination in its hiring practices. FCC administrative law judge Reuben Lozner visited Greenwood in October to conduct a week of hearings and hear testimony from station officials and petitioners. In September 1975, Lozner handed down an initial decision denying the renewal of both stations' licenses. He said that WSWG's claims that a switch was necessary to save it from bankruptcy lacked credibility, that Saunders had a "patent lack of candor" in saying that Blacks and Whites had essentially indistinguishable needs, and that Leflore Broadcasting's firing of the Black staffers upon the 1971 format change violated FCC rules.

Saunders mounted an appeal of the decision to the full FCC, which allowed the stations to stay on the air. Commissioners grilled Forbes W. Blair, the attorney for the WSWG stations, when he claimed the promises the firm had made in the past came from an "overly zealous former general manager", and the FCC upheld the administrative law judge's decision and denied renewal to the AM and FM outlets in July 1977. The stations would seek a reversal of the decision in federal appeals court. The United States Court of Appeals for the District of Columbia Circuit upheld the decision in 1980, though it took the FCC to task for failing to explain the particular reasons for denying the license renewal applications.

=== Interim operation and new construction permits ===
After denying a renewal to Leflore Broadcasting (for the AM) and Dixie Broadcasting (for the FM), the commission permitted the Leflore-Dixie Employee Venture, composed of the employees of WSWG-AM-FM, to continue to operate the stations on its own, doing so by leasing the equipment from Saunders. The station programmed adult contemporary music during the day and an R&B format at night on the FM frequency. As an interim operator, the Employee Venture had to donate all profits from their operations to charity, disbursing $12,500 in profits for 1981 to three organizations. At the start of 1981, eight full-time employees—one of them Black and three of them women—were employed by and owned the company.

Interim operation, however, also meant that applications could be taken for permanent authority for the two stations, and the Leflore-Dixie employee group would not be alone in seeking completely new construction permits. A group of five local residents known as Mid-Delta Broadcasting formed to apply for new permits for the pair. They were joined by two other groups, East Delta Communications and Ron Grantham, owner of a recording studio. Because interim operation had to be agreed on by all parties involved, when negotiations fell through and the Leflore-Dixie and Mid-Delta groups dropped out, the WSWG stations went off the air at midnight on August 18, 1982. The stations went back on a week later—with a skeleton crew and a new music library—as Grantham and East Delta stepped in to continue providing an interim service on the AM and FM frequencies.

=== WSWG after 1984 ===
In 1984, the FCC adjudicated the competing applications for the former WSWG AM and FM frequencies, splitting them among the two remaining bidders. The AM went to Leflore-Dixie, Inc., while Grantham was selected for the FM frequency. Each party appealed the other's win of the frequency they lost.

Grantham, owner for the FM frequency which remained in operation continuously, committed suicide in 1985; Ron Grantham Broadcasting, Inc., was created by his heirs to run WSWG-FM. Leflore-Dixie then sold the construction permit for the AM station, with the call letters WKXG, to Edmonds Rigdon Broadcasting in 1986; simultaneously, Edmonds Rigdon purchased WSWG-FM from Ron Grantham Broadcasting. The AM station returned to air August 17, 1987, as WKXG. Both stations were sold in 1988, and the FM took its present call sign of WYMX.
