= WHER =

WHER may refer to:

- WLAU, a radio station (99.3 FM) licensed to Heidelberg, Mississippi, United States, as WHER from 1999 to 2012
- WOWW, a radio station (1430 AM) licensed to serve Germantown, Tennessee, United States, which held the call sign WHER from 1955 to 1973
