= WBZL =

WBZL may refer to:

- WBZL (FM), a radio station (103.3 FM) licensed to serve Greenwood, Mississippi, United States
- WSFL-TV, a television station (channel 39) licensed to serve Miami, Florida, United States, which held the call sign WBZL from 1998 to 2006
