= WTNI (Mississippi) =

Coordinates: 30°28′27.7″N 88°51′23.1″W

Former simulcast of WANG Biloxi
- Biloxi, Mississippi; United States
- Frequency: 1640 kHz
- Branding: Bob 106.3

Programming
- Format: Adult hits

Ownership
- Owner: Stephen Davenport; (Telesouth Communications Inc)
- Sister stations: WXYK; WOSM; WCPR-FM; WGBL; WANG

History
- First air date: 1950 (570 kHz as WVMI); 2003 (1640 kHz as WTNI)
- Last air date: 2025
- Call sign meaning: Talk, News, Information (former format)

Technical information
- Licensing authority: FCC
- Facility ID: 87159
- Class: B
- Power: 10,000 watts day; 1,000 watts night

Links
- Public license information: Public file; LMS

WTNI (1640 AM) was a radio station licensed to Biloxi, Mississippi, which broadcast an adult hits format as "Bob 106.3" with 10,000 watts daytime and 1,000 watts at night. It was one of six broadcasting stations in the United States licensed for 1640 kHz.

== History ==
WTNI was the AM expanded band successor to WVMI on AM 570. WVMI was initially licensed to Radio Associates in Biloxi, Mississippi. It was granted a construction permit in February 1947, and signed on in March 1950. The station originally was limited to daytime-only operation with 1,000 watts. In 1976, the signal was upgraded to 5,000 watts daytime, and 1,000 watts at night. In 1990, WVMI was sold to Telesouth Communications, which changed the format from country music to news/talk.

=== Expanded band assignment ===
On March 17, 1997, the Federal Communications Commission (FCC) announced that 88 stations had been given permission to move to newly available AM expanded band transmitting frequencies, ranging from 1610 to 1700 kHz, with WVMI authorized to move from 570 kHz to 1640 kHz.

A construction permit for the expanded band station, also located in Biloxi, was assigned the call letters WTNI on December 13, 2002. The FCC's initial policy was that both the original station and its expanded band counterpart could operate simultaneously for up to five years, after which owners would have to turn in one of the two licenses, depending on whether they preferred the new assignment or elected to remain on the original frequency, although this deadline was extended multiple times.

The new operation on 1640 kHz was licensed in 2003. The WTNI call sign stood for "Talk, News, Information", and the station continued WVMI's news/talk format. Later that year WVMI ceased operations on 570 kHz, and its license was cancelled on June 26, 2003.

=== Later history ===
WTNI later began simulcasting WANG (1490 AM)'s "The Champ" sports format. This was discontinued on March 8, 2019, with WANG switching to a classic country format, and WTNI continuing with sports. The following June, WTNI returned to simulcasting WANG, now carrying that station's classic country programming as "103.5 The Possum".

On December 22, 2020, WTNI and WANG flipped to a tourist information format as "106.3 Casino Radio"; the stations primarily carried segments and advertising highlighting local casinos, restaurants, and other attractions in the Biloxi area.

In late October 2021, 106.3 FM began "stunting", playing novelty Christmas music followed by rotating sets of odd songs, including the Mickey Mouse Clubhouse theme song, along with songs from O Brother, Where Art Thou?, including "Big Rock Candy Mountain", and "Man of Constant Sorrow". On October 8, they also ran a teaser between songs, announcing a "brand new station" coming at 5:00. At that time the station flipped to the "Bob" format, which plays "80s, 90s and Whatever". This format was formerly played on WQBB (105.9 FM), which was changed to "The Monkey" on March 1, 2019.

The FCC cancelled the station’s license on June 23, 2025.
