= WKXG (AM) =

Radio station in Greenwood, Mississippi

- Greenwood, Mississippi; United States
- Frequency: 1540 kHz
- Branding: "Gospel 1540 AM"

Programming
- Format: Gospel music

Ownership
- Owner: Eternity Media Group
- Sister stations: WHJA; WERM; WABF; WNRR; WLNO

History
- First air date: August 17, 1987
- Last air date: August 1, 2020

Technical information
- Facility ID: 65008
- Class: D
- Power: 1,000 watts daytime; 2 watts nighttime
- Transmitter coordinates: 33°31′12″N 90°8′28″W

WKXG was an AM radio station broadcasting on the assigned frequency of 1540 kilohertz and licensed to Greenwood, Mississippi, United States.

WKXG operated as a noncommercial educational station and last aired a gospel music format known as Gospel 1540. Its final owner was Eternity Media Group.

WKXG was put on the air in 1987 after proceedings to license a successor to WSWG (1540 AM), whose license was canceled in 1981 and which thereafter was operated on an interim basis until 1984. Oriented toward the black community for its entire history, it was shut down by its commercial owners in 2009 as a money loser and thereafter was operated as a noncommercial station for several years. The Federal Communications Commission canceled the license in 2021, finding that the station had not operated with authorized facilities for at least a year.

== History ==
WKXG came into being as the result of the Federal Communications Commission (FCC) denying the renewal of license of WSWG AM and WSWG-FM 99.1, owned by Charles Saunders, in 1980 over racial discrimination issues and misrepresentations made to the FCC. After the denial, an interim operation, the Leflore-Dixie Employee Venture, owned by WSWG's eight staffers, was set up to run both stations until the commission determined permanent owners for both frequencies, though a falling out in 1982 led to a new interim operator. The AM and FM were awarded in 1984 in a split decision, with the AM station going to Leflore-Dixie (the successor to the employee venture) and the FM to Ron Grantham. However, in 1986, Edmonds Rigdon Broadcasting acquired both stations from their owners.

The AM station, taking the call sign WKXG, returned to air August 17, 1987, airing an urban contemporary music format to reach an underserved audience: the black community in majority-black Leflore County. The next year, the Mississippi Network, a Jackson, Mississippi-based syndicator of news and agriculture programming to radio stations around the state controlled by Steve Davenport, purchased WKXG and WSWG from Edmonds.

WKXG, which eventually transitioned to a gospel music format, did not make money, and during the Great Recession in 2009, Telesouth Communications (the renamed Mississippi Network) opted to shut the station altogether. In 2010, after another 11 months of silence, Telesouth Communications donated the WKXG facility to Joy Christian Communications, a non-profit organization. Three years later, the station was taken over by Roots Town Radio of Pennsylvania and changed from religious programming to an Americana music format.

However, instead of Roots Town, Eternity Media Group acquired the station in 2013 and programmed it with a gospel format. The station's operational record under Eternity was sporadic. In 2019, the FCC dismissed an application that sought to move the station to 1550 kHz from a new city of license, Bolton, Mississippi. Starting in 2020, the efforts of another radio station owner in the market would bring to light operation in violation of FCC rules that led the commission to cancel the license. Larry Fuss, owner of Delta Radio Network, alleged that the station was off the air for long periods—one of more than a year, which would spur automatic license cancellation under Section 312(g) of the Telecommunications Act of 1996—and only operated by "taking turns" in an unauthorized fashion with one of Eternity's other stations, WGRM (1240 AM). These allegations led the FCC to send a letter of inquiry to Eternity in April 2021 as to the station's operating status since the start of 2019. A failure to sufficiently answer that letter and another related to an Eternity-owned FM station in the state led the FCC to cancel the licenses on October 18, 2021, finding that the last possible date the station may have operated was August 1, 2020.
