= XHJMG-FM =

Radio station in Cuernavaca, Morelos, Mexico

- Cuernavaca, Morelos, Mexico; Mexico
- Frequency: 96.5 MHz
- Branding: Los 40

Programming
- Format: Pop
- Affiliations: Radiópolis

Ownership
- Owner: Grupo Mundo Comunicaciones; (Radio Difusoras de Morelos, S.A. de C.V.)
- Sister stations: XHCMR-FM, XHTIX-FM

History
- First air date: October 24, 1973 (concession)
- Former call signs: XHLM-FM (1973–2002)
- Call sign meaning: In honor of Jaime Morales Guillén, founder of Grupo Mundo

Technical information
- ERP: 12.487 kW

Links
- Website: los40cuernavaca.com

XHJMG-FM is a radio station on 96.5 FM in Cuernavaca, Morelos, Mexico. It is owned by Grupo Mundo Comunicaciones and is the local franchise of the Los 40 pop format from Radiópolis.

== History ==
XHJMG began as XHLM-FM, which received its concession on October 24, 1973, and was owned by (and named for, in the style of many early Mexican FM station concessions) Ricardo López Méndez. (The XHLM call sign now resides on 105.9 FM in Tuxtla Gutiérrez, Chiapas.)

In 1982, López Méndez sold to Radio Difusoras de Morelos, S.A. On April 16, 2002, XHLM was authorized to become XHJMG-FM, honoring Jaime Morales Guillén, who founded Grupo Mundo.

The station dropped its long-running "Mundo 96.5" name on January 9, 2023, when it flipped to Los 40. The pop franchise had previously been used locally by XHNG-FM 98.1 until 2011 and XHTB-FM 93.3 until 2017.
