= XHJPA-FM =

Radio station in Jojutla, Morelos, Mexico

- Jojutla, Morelos; Mexico
- Broadcast area: Cuernavaca, Morelos
- Frequency: 90.3 FM
- Branding: Stereo Vida

Programming
- Format: Spanish adult contemporary

Ownership
- Owner: Grupo Radiorama; (Radio Unión, S.A. de C.V.)
- Sister stations: XHASM, XHSW, XHTB

History
- First air date: October 6, 1965 (concession)
- Former call signs: XEJPA-AM, XEDO-AM
- Former frequencies: 1190 AM

Technical information
- ERP: 3,000 watts
- Transmitter coordinates: 18°41′57″N 99°14′56″W

Links
- Webcast: radioramamorelos.com.mx
- Website: Listen live

XHJPA-FM is a radio station on 90.3 FM serving Jojutla and Cuernavaca, Morelos, Mexico.

== History ==
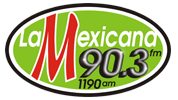
Logo used as La Mexicana until November 2019

XHJPA began as XEDO-AM 1190 with a concession granted on October 6, 1965. The call sign was changed to XEJPA-AM in the late 1990s or early 2000s, at the same time the station began transmitting at night and increased its day power to 5 kW. Formats of the late 1990s and early 2000s included "La Grande 1190 AM", W Radio, and the short-lived Red W Interactiva.

XEJPA migrated to FM in 2011 and became XHJPA-FM, branding as "La Poderosa". The station became "La Mexicana" in 2013, when the Radiorama cluster in Cuernavaca split; it retained this name until November 2019, when it flipped to Spanish adult contemporary as "Stereo Vida".
