= XHASM-FM =

Radio station in Ahuatepec–Cuernavaca, Morelos, Mexico

- Ahuatepec, Morelos; Mexico
- Broadcast area: Cuernavaca, Morelos
- Frequency: 107.7 (MHz)
- Branding: Éxtasis Digital

Programming
- Format: Adult Contemporary

Ownership
- Owner: Grupo Radiorama; (Negocios Modernos, S.A. de C.V.)
- Sister stations: XHJPA, XHSW, XHTB

History
- First air date: May 14, 1943 (concession)
- Former call signs: XEJC-AM, XEASM-AM

Technical information
- Class: A
- ERP: 3,000 watts
- Transmitter coordinates: 18°58′54″N 99°12′16″W

Links
- Webcast: Listen live
- Website: radioramamorelos.com.mx

XHASM-FM is an Adult Contemporary radio station in Cuernavaca, Morelos, Mexico. Broadcasting on 107.7 MHz, XHASM is owned by Radiorama and carries its Éxtasis Digital format.

== History ==
XEJC-AM 1340 was awarded to Eduardo Jiménez de la Cuesta, with a concession date of May 14, 1943. In 1950, it was sold to Miguel Ángel Tenorio Benítez, and then in 1954 to Negocios Modernos, S. de R.L., also controlled by the Tenorio Benítez family. Negocios Modernos expanded, founding XHTB-FM 105.9 (later 93.3) in the late 1960s.

Logo while also on 1340

Sometime in the 1990s or early 2000s, XEJC became XEASM-AM. It then migrated to FM in 2011 as XHASM-FM 107.7. A romantic station known as "Romántica" at the time of migration, Éxtasis Digital moved to this station in 2013 from XHNG-FM 98.1.
