= KLBP =

KLBP may refer to:

- KLBP-LP, a low-power radio station (99.1 FM) licensed to serve Long Beach, California, United States
- KMNQ, a radio station (1470 AM) licensed to serve Brooklyn Park, Minnesota, United States, which held the call sign KLBP from 1999 to 2005
