= WZNF =

- Lumberton, Mississippi; United States
- Broadcast area: Gulfport–Biloxi
- Frequency: 95.3 MHz
- Branding: 95.3 Gorilla

Programming
- Language: English
- Format: Top 40 (CHR)

Ownership
- Owner: Lisa Stiglets and Elizabeth McQueen; (JLE, Incorporated)
- Sister stations: WGCM, WGCM-FM, WROA, WRPM, WZKX

History
- First air date: 1986; 40 years ago
- Former call signs: WLUN (1983–1997); WLNF (1997-2002)

Technical information
- Licensing authority: FCC
- Facility ID: 63486
- Class: C0
- ERP: 40,000 watts
- HAAT: 435 meters (1,427 feet)
- Transmitter coordinates: 30°45′05.70″N 89°03′24.20″W

Links
- Public license information: Public file; LMS
- Webcast: Listen Live
- Website: 953gorilla.com

WZNF (95.3 FM, "95-3 Gorilla") is a commercial radio station licensed to Lumberton, Mississippi and serving the Biloxi–Gulfport area. The station airs a top 40 (CHR) radio format and is owned by Lisa Stiglets and Elizabeth McQueen, through licensee JLE, Incorporated.

WZNF's upgraded 1,560-foot tower and 40,000 watts can reach east to Mobile, Alabama, west to New Orleans, and north to Laurel, Mississippi. The transmitter tower is shared with sister station "Kicker 108" WZKX, located off City Bridge Road in McHenry, Mississippi.

== History ==
=== WLUN ===
In 1983, a construction permit for a new FM radio station was issued by the Federal Communications Commission (FCC) for 95.3 MHz in Lumberton, Mississippi. In those days, the 95.3 spot on the dial was reserved for Class A regional stations, with a maximum power of 3,000 watts.

The station first signed on as WLUN in 1986. It was owned by the Stone-Lamar Broadcasting Services Corporation. WLUN's power of 3,000 watts was only a fraction of its current output. It had a limited coverage area, and was not audible in Gulfport or Biloxi.

=== Live 95/Power 95-3 ===
On September 1, 1997, the station got FCC permission to greatly boost its power and height above average terrain (HAAT) to expand its coverage area to the Gulf Coast. The station increased its ERP to 50,000 watts and started broadcasting from WXXV-TV's 1,480-foot tower, covering most of Southern Mississippi, including the Gulf Coast, Hattiesburg, and parts of Alabama and Louisiana. It became modern-leaning adult contemporary outlet WLNF – "Live 95.3". The station achieved moderate success with the format and featured The Big Show with Scott Sands, Darren Kies and Virginia McGrane in mornings.

On March 19, 1999, WLNF dropped the AC format for a Top 40 (CHR) sound as "Power 95-3". The station was meant to pay homage to the old "Power 108" WZKX, and featured Crash Davis in mornings and market vet Patty Steele as Program Director and midday host. Later, the station added the syndicated Bob and Sheri Show for morning drive time.

=== Z95.3 ===
With heated competition against WXYK (107.1 The Monkey), Power 95-3 had trouble catching on with Gulf Coast listeners. On March 15, 2002, the station changed formats to classic rock as Z95.3. The call sign switched to WZNF.

The station immediately saw success with the format and was consistently #1 in morning ratings with the syndicated Walton & Johnson program. Other personalities on the station included Patty Steele in middays, Scott Bond doing afternoons and market vet Dr. Bob McCall on nights. The station saw a ratings decline after Walton & Johnson were replaced with John Boy and Billy, syndicated from Charlotte, North Carolina.

=== 95-3 Gorilla ===
On April 1, 2014, after struggling in the ratings for a few years, Z95.3 changed formats back to CHR/Top 40 as 95-3 Gorilla, once again going up against WXYK 105.9 (then 107.1) The Monkey.

95.3 Gorilla launched with 10,000 songs commercial-free. The staff included Bo "Wildman" Walker in mornings, Kendall Taylor afternoons and Dakota Mendenhall at night.

As of December 2024, WZNF downgraded its signal from 100,000 watts directional to 40,000 watts nondirectional.
