= WKXG =

WKXG may refer to:

- WKXG (FM), a radio station (92.7 FM) licensed to serve Moorhead, Mississippi, United States
- WKXG (AM), a defunct radio station (1540 AM) formerly licensed to serve Greenwood, Mississippi
