= WQFX =

WQFX may refer to:

- WQFX (AM), a radio station (1130 AM) licensed to Gulfport, Mississippi, United States
- WQFX-FM, a radio station (103.1 FM) licensed to Russell, Pennsylvania, United States
