= XHUI-FM =

Radio station in Comitán de Domínguez, Chiapas

- Comitán de Domínguez, Chiapas; Mexico
- Frequency: 99.1 FM
- Branding: Extremo Grupero

Programming
- Format: Grupera

Ownership
- Owner: Radio Núcleo; (XEUI Radio Comitán, S.A. de C.V.)

History
- First air date: October 28, 1963 (concession)

Technical information
- ERP: 25 kW
- Transmitter coordinates: 16°15′20″N 92°08′12″W

Links
- Website: Radio Núcleo Website

XHUI-FM is a radio station on 99.1 FM in Comitán de Domínguez, Chiapas, in Mexico. The station is owned by Radio Núcleo and carries its grupera format, known as Extremo Grupero.

== History ==
XHUI began as XEUI-AM 1320, with a concession awarded on October 28, 1963. It was owned by Fernando Balderas Rodríguez and broadcast with 1,000 watts.

In June 1968, the station was sold to Celia María Amador Carrillo de Partida. In 1997, ownership passed to a corporation, and in the early 2000s XEUI moved to 800 and increased its power to 5,000 watts. XEUI was cleared to migrate to FM in 2010.

Previous logo
