= WCPR-FM =

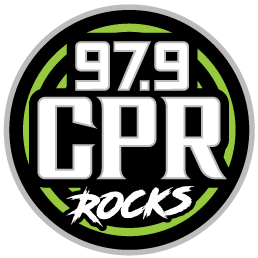
- D'Iberville, Mississippi; United States
- Broadcast area: Biloxi-Gulfport, Mississippi
- Frequency: 97.9 MHz
- Branding: 97-9 CPR Rocks

Programming
- Language: English
- Format: Active rock

Ownership
- Owner: TeleSouth Communications Inc
- Sister stations: WXYK, WOSM, WGBL, WANG

History
- First air date: 1994
- Former call signs: WPHF (1990); WOTC (1990–1992); WUSD (1992–1995)

Technical information
- Licensing authority: FCC
- Facility ID: 72194
- Class: C2
- ERP: 50,000 watts
- HAAT: 142 meters (466 feet)
- Transmitter coordinates: 30°37′02.70″N 89°08′03.20″W

Links
- Public license information: Public file; LMS
- Webcast: Listen live
- Website: 979cprrocks.com

WCPR-FM (97.9 MHz) is a radio station licensed to D'Iberville, Mississippi. Its transmitter is located in Saucier, Mississippi, on a 466-foot tower at 50,000 watts of power. WCPR plays primarily rock and alternative music. The station's signal reaches far west to Covington, Louisiana, far east to Mobile, Alabama, and far north to Hattiesburg, Mississippi.

== History ==
The station started out with a country music format as "US 98" from 1994 to 1995. On September 20, 1995, the station dropped country for active rock as "Real Rock 97.9 WCPR" and became the first new rock station on the Mississippi Gulf Coast. WCPR was founded and conceived by New Orleans Radio veterans Kenny Vest, Scot Fox, and Weerd Wayne Watkins. Vest, Fox, and Kyle Curley are all original staffers that are still at the radio station today, 30 years later.

In 2012, 2013, 2014, 2015, and 2016, WCPR was nominated for a RadioContraband Rock Radio Award for "Small Market Radio Station of the Year".

In July 2014, station owner, Triad Broadcasting was sold to Alpha Media along with sister stations, WXYK, WGBL, WQBB and WTNI.

In December 2018, Alpha Media announced that it would be selling its Gulf Coast cluster to local Mississippi broadcast company, Telesouth Communications Inc, who already owns WOSM, the Biloxi affiliate of its Supertalk Mississippi network in the market. The FCC approved the sale on February 12, 2019, and closed on March 1, 2019.
