= WZKR =

- Collinsville, Mississippi; United States
- Broadcast area: Meridian, Mississippi
- Frequency: 103.3 MHz
- Branding: Supertalk Mississippi

Programming
- Format: News/Talk

Ownership
- Owner: Stephen Davenport; (TeleSouth Communications, Inc.)

Technical information
- Licensing authority: FCC
- Facility ID: 76435
- Class: C3
- ERP: 6,000 watts
- HAAT: 167 meters (548 ft)
- Transmitter coordinates: 32°19′34.50″N 88°41′12.10″W

Links
- Public license information: Public file; LMS

WZKR (103.3 FM) is a radio station broadcasting in the Meridian, Mississippi, area. Since August 1, 2011, it has been an affiliate of the Supertalk Mississippi network. Previously, it broadcast a country format as B103, and before that an eclectic music format as "103.3 The Art of Great Music".
