= XHMOM-FM =

Radio station in Morelia, Michoacán, Mexico

Morelia, Michoacán; Mexico
- Frequency: 99.1 FM
- Branding: Clasics

Ownership
- Owner: Medios Radiofónicos Michoacán; (Flavio René Acevedo)

History
- First air date: June 26, 2013 (permit)
- Call sign meaning: MOrelia Michoacán

Technical information
- Class: A
- ERP: 3 kW
- HAAT: 15.37 meters
- Transmitter coordinates: 19°40′27.4″N 101°11′12.3″W

Links
- Webcast: Listen live
- Website: radiomejor.mx

XHMOM-FM is a noncommercial radio station on 99.1 FM in Morelia, Michoacán, Mexico. It is owned by Medios Radiofónicos Michoacán through permitholder Flavio René Acevedo and carries its Clasics format, which is carried on MRM's three permit stations in the state.

XHMOM received its permit on June 26, 2013.
