= WROA =

Coordinates: 30°27′30″N 89°04′45″W

- Gulfport, Mississippi; United States
- Frequency: 1390 kHz
- Branding: Merle 100.1

Programming
- Format: Classic country

Ownership
- Owner: Lisa Stiglets and Elizabeth McQueen; (JLE, Incorporated)
- Sister stations: WGCM, WGCM-FM, WRPM, WZKX, WZNF

History
- First air date: February 27, 1955

Technical information
- Licensing authority: FCC
- Facility ID: 17478
- Class: D
- Power: 900 watts (day); 35 watts (night)
- Translator: 100.1 W261CU (Gulfport)

Links
- Public license information: Public file; LMS
- Webcast: Listen live
- Website: wroaam.com

WROA (1390 AM) is a commercial radio station licensed to Gulfport, Mississippi, United States. It is owned by the Lisa Stiglets and Elizabeth McQueen, through licensee JLE, Incorporated, and broadcasts a classic country format. Its studios and offices are on Lorraine Road in Gulfport. WROA uses its FM dial position in its moniker, "Merle 100.1." Merle refers to the late country artist Merle Haggard.

The transmitter is on Bayou View Road in Gulfport, near the Biloxi River. WROA is also heard on FM translator W261CU at 100.1 MHz.

== History ==
On February 27, 1955, the station first signed on the air. It was originally powered at 5,000 watts around the clock and carried a Top 40 format in the 1960s and 70s. In 1959, it was acquired by Charles and Morgan Dowdy, who served as president and general manager, respectively. Their names remained part of the licensee's name – Dowdy & Dowdy Partnership – for many years.

In 1964, WROA got an FM simulcast, 107.1 WROA-FM (now WLGF). The FM station later stopped simulcasting WROA and began airing a beautiful music format.

In March 2019, WROA changed its format from adult standards to classic country, branded as "Merle 100.1".

Effective May 19, 2022, Dowdy & Dowdy sold WROA, five sister stations, and three translators to JLE, Incorporated in exchange for assumption of a promissory note valued at $3,255,214.
