= WDXO =

Radio station in Hazlehurst, Mississippi

- Hazlehurst, Mississippi; United States
- Broadcast area: Jackson metropolitan area
- Frequency: 92.9 MHz
- Branding: G93

Programming
- Format: Classic hip hop

Ownership
- Owner: Telesouth Communications
- Sister stations: WOEG, WRQO

History
- First air date: December 24, 1970
- Former call signs: WMDC-FM (1970–1998)
- Former frequencies: 100.9 MHz (1970–1999)

Technical information
- Licensing authority: FCC
- Facility ID: 13857
- Class: A
- ERP: 2,700 watts
- HAAT: 151.4 meters (497 ft)
- Transmitter coordinates: 31°53′33″N 90°24′8″W

Links
- Public license information: Public file; LMS
- Webcast: Listen live
- Website: wdxo929.com

WDXO (92.9 MHz) is a commercial FM radio station, serving the Jackson metropolitan area. Licensed to Hazlehurst, Mississippi, the station is owned by Telesouth Communications.

As of February 1, 2024, WDXO's format is classic hip-hop.

== History ==
The station signed on the air on December 24, 1970. Its original call sign was WMDC-FM. At first, it simulcast its sister station, WMDC 1220 AM (now WOEG). Because the AM station was a daytimer, WMDC-FM was able to continue its programming after sunset.

In January, 1998, the station's call letters had changed to WDXO.

In December, 1999, the station had swapped frequencies with WJXN.

In 2006, O'Neal Broadcasting sold WDXO, WOEG, and WRQO to Jackson-based TeleSouth Communications (now SuperTalk Mississippi Media).

On May 1, 2008, the station had flipped from adult contemporary to sports radio (ESPN Radio). It had been branded as 92.9 The Ticket.

On June 1, 2018, the station had flipped from sports to adult hits. It had been branded as 92.9 Jack FM.

On February 1, 2024, the station flipped from adult hits (Jack FM) to classic hip-hop. Its new branding is g 93.
