= Gregory Berger =

American documentarian working in Mexico

Gregory Berger is an American documentarian working in Mexico. He is a professor of film at the autonomous University of Morelos and teaches the only queer cinema course offered in Mexico. He produces segments for the Venezuelan government's television propaganda network Telesur. His works often focus on the social struggle of Mexico, indigenous peoples, and the tension between Mexico and the US. Although he calls himself a revolutionary tourist, he is a permanent resident of Mexico, though originally from New York City.

His documentaries include Amor en tiempos de influenza (Love in the times of influenza) and La rebeldia bajo sitio (Rebellion under siege), as well as features for Democracy Now!.

== Themes ==
Berger often uses the persona "Gringoyo", a "tragicomic character to talk about social issues" that concern him, and utilizes street-theater and humor, drawing comparisons to Michael Moore. His film Love in the times of influenza focusses on the H1N1 crisis, and the role Smithfield Foods allegedly played in its outbreak. His piece Rebellion under siege focusses on Zapatista communities throughout southern Mexico.
