= WZKX =

- Bay St. Louis, Mississippi; United States
- Broadcast area: Biloxi–Gulfport–Pascagoula
- Frequency: 107.9 MHz (HD Radio)
- Branding: Kicker 108; The Quake (HD2)

Programming
- Language: English
- Format: Country
- Subchannels: HD2: Classic and Alternative Rock

Ownership
- Owner: Coast Radio Group; (Coast Radio Group, Incorporated)
- Sister stations: WGCM, WGCM-FM, WROA, WZNF

History
- First air date: February 14, 1966
- Former call signs: WRPM-FM (1966–1985); WQLC (1985–1987)
- Call sign meaning: "Kicker"

Technical information
- Licensing authority: FCC
- Facility ID: 17477
- Class: C
- ERP: 100,000 watts
- HAAT: 465.2 meters (1,526 ft)
- Transmitter coordinates: 30°45′05.70″N 89°03′24.20″W

Links
- Public license information: Public file; LMS
- Webcast: Listen live
- Website: kicker108.com; quakehdr.com (HD2)

WZKX (107.9 FM, "Kicker 108") is a commercial radio station licensed to Bay St. Louis, Mississippi, United States, and serving the Gulfport–Biloxi-Pascagoula market. Due to its 100,000-watt power, the station is also heard and ranks all throughout the metro New Orleans radio market. It broadcasts a country music format and is owned by Coast Radio Group. Its studios are on Lorraine Road in Gulfport.

The transmitter is located on City Bridge Road in Perkinston. WZKX also broadcasts with HD Radio technology: the HD2 digital subchannel carries a Mixed Classic and Alternative Rock format known as "The Quake".

== History ==
The station signed on the air on February 14, 1966. Its original call sign was WRPM-FM, the sister station of WRPM 1170 AM (formerly 1530 AM). WRPM-AM-FM had their city of license in Poplarville. They were owned by Ben O. Griffin and largely simulcast their programming. Even though WRPM-FM was powered at the maximum 100,000 watts, its signal was limited by its short antenna height of only 175 feet (53 m).

In the late 1970s, WRPM-FM split its programming from the AM station. It was one of the only album rock radio stations on the Gulf Coast. The studios were located in Orange Grove just north of Gulfport. Rock 107 played harder-edged rock acts, from Boston to Rush. A "Power Rock Song" was heard at the beginning of each hour and the disc jockeys were free to play the rock albums they wanted.

Similar to the plot in the 1978 movie, FM, management decided in 1982 to end the free form format and go with a playlist of airing only the best selling albums. Some DJs, like late night host Jeff Davis, left the station, though Mark "In the Middle" McGraw remained.

In 1987, the station relocated its transmitter to WXXV-TV's 1,480-foot tower. The power and antenna height allowed the station to reach east to Mobile, west to New Orleans and north to Laurel. It became a Top 40 station branded as Power 108. The original Power 108 airstaff was Bryan Rhodes in mornings, with the late Dave Melton Sr. doing news, Mark McGraw hosting middays (Mark in the Middle), P.D. The Real Rick James doing afternoons, Mark ("The Top Gun") Gunn heard in the evening and Reverend Red (Collins Powell) covering late nights.

In September 1994, the station flipped to country and branded as Kicker 108. The station is voiced by Aaron Bradley and Pat Garrett. WZKX broadcasts using HD radio technology, with the Analog 107.9 FM airing on the HD1 channel and "The Quake" airing on a digital subchannel. Previously, WZKX had a second digital subchannel, with the HD3 station airing a Rhythmic Throwback format known as "The Hype" which moved to WGCM in October of 2025. Shortly after, WZKX-HD3 was shut off.
