= WKCU =

- Corinth, Mississippi; United States
- Broadcast area: Corinth, Mississippi; Burnsville, Mississippi; Booneville, Mississippi; Guys, Tennessee
- Frequency: 1350 kHz
- Branding: 1350 and 92.9 WKCU

Programming
- Format: Country
- Affiliations: Mississippi State University Radio Network

Ownership
- Owner: TeleSouth Media; (TeleSouth Communications Inc.)
- Sister stations: WXRZ

History
- First air date: October 24, 1965

Technical information
- Licensing authority: FCC
- Facility ID: 66282
- Class: D
- Power: 900 watts (day); 44 watts (night)
- Transmitter coordinates: 34°54′29.0″N 88°30′6.0″W

Links
- Public license information: Public file; LMS
- Website: WKCU Online

WKCU is a Country formatted radio station licensed to Corinth, Mississippi. WKCU serves Corinth, Burnsville, and Booneville in Mississippi and Guys in Tennessee. WKCU is owned and operated by Telesouth Communications Inc. The station is a member of the Mississippi Association of Broadcasters.

== Translator ==
In addition to the main station, WKCU is relayed by an FM translator to widen its broadcast area. It is owned by TeleSouth Media and operated under their licensee TeleSouth Communications Inc. The translator also provides high fidelity stereophonic sound.

Broadcast translator for WKCU
Call sign	Frequency	City of license	FID	ERP (W)	HAAT	Class	Transmitter coordinates	FCC info
W225BN	(92.9 FM) FM	Corinth, Mississippi	145183	250 watts	35 m (115 ft)	D	34°54′29.30″N 88°30′6.10″W	LMS
