= WFTA =

Coordinates: 34.263°N 88.540°W

- Fulton, Mississippi; United States
- Broadcast area: Tupelo, Mississippi
- Frequency: 101.9 MHz
- Branding: Supertalk Mississippi

Programming
- Format: Talk

Ownership
- Owner: Stephen C. Davenport; (Telesouth Communications, Inc.)

History
- First air date: 1976 (at 101.7)
- Former frequencies: 101.7 MHz (1976–1988)

Technical information
- Facility ID: 666
- Class: C2
- ERP: 50,000 watts
- HAAT: 146 meters (479 ft)

Links
- Webcast: Listen Live
- Website: supertalk.fm

WFTA (101.9 FM), known as "Supertalk Mississippi", is a talk radio station based in Fulton, Mississippi that serves Tupelo and Northeast Mississippi with an ERP of 50,000 watts. WFTA is owned by Stephen C. Davenport, through licensee Telesouth Communications Inc. On-air shows include Bop's Sing-A-Long in the morning with Craig Horton.

On June 1, 2019, WFTA changed their format from classic rock to talk, branded as "SuperTalk Mississippi".
