= XHEPT-FM =

Radio station in Misantla, Veracruz, Mexico

- Misantla, Veracruz, Mexico; Mexico
- Frequency: 99.1 MHz
- Branding: Ke Buena

Programming
- Format: Regional Mexican
- Affiliations: Radiópolis

Ownership
- Owner: Grupo MS Multimedios; (Radio XEPT, S.A.)

History
- First air date: October 31, 1964 (concession)

Technical information
- ERP: 35 kW
- HAAT: -177.32 meters
- Transmitter coordinates: 19°56′02″N 96°50′24″W

Links
- Website: www.misantlafm.com

XHEPT-FM is a radio station on 99.1 FM in Misantla, Veracruz, Mexico, carries the Ke Buena Regional Mexican format from Radiópolis.

== History ==
XEPT-AM 1590 received its concession on October 31, 1964. It was owned by Hilario Ávila Serrano and broadcast with 1,000 watts day and 100 watts night.

XEPT moved to FM in 2012 as XHEPT-FM 99.1.
