= XHNZI-FM =

Radio station in Nacozari, Sonora, Mexico

- Nacozari, Sonora; Mexico
- Frequency: 99.1 MHz
- Branding: La Reina de la Sierra

Programming
- Format: Regional Mexican

Ownership
- Owner: Grupo Radio Guaymas; (Claudia Elena Lizárraga Verdugo)

History
- First air date: October 1994 (concession)
- Call sign meaning: "Nacozari"

Technical information
- Licensing authority: CRT
- Class: A
- ERP: 3 kW
- HAAT: −39 m (−128 ft)

Links
- Webcast: Listen live
- Website: gruporadioguaymas.com

XHNZI-FM is a radio station on 99.1 FM in Nacozari, Sonora. It is owned by Grupo Radio Guaymas and carries a Regional Mexican format known as La Reina de la Sierra.

== History ==
The concession for XHNZI was awarded on October 28, 1994, to Javier Moreno Valle, a businessman from Mexico City who would found XHTVM-TV in Mexico City and XHEPR-FM, a radio station in Ciudad Juárez, Chihuahua.

It officially began operations in September 1999 under the name of La Reina del Cobre, and its first programmers were Carlos Sanabia "El Sunguirirungui", Víctor Peraza "El Amigo de la Raza", Manuel Rodríguez "El Chuky Boys", and Rosy Enríquez.

The station's concession was passed to Claudia Elena Lizárraga Verdugo in 2008. Grupo Radio Guaymas transferred operation of the station to Grupo Larsa Comunicaciones, a dominant radio broadcaster in the state of Sonora, in 2017; Larsa Comunicaciones immediately dropped the La Reyna del Cobre name and format for its own Toño Spanish-language adult hits format.

In 2023, Larsa Comunicaciones ceased operating the station. Grupo Radio Guaymas resumed operating XHNZI as La Reina de la Sierra ("Queen of the Mountains") with a Regional Mexican format.
