= XHSL-FM =

Radio station in Piedras Negras, Coahuila

- Piedras Negras, Coahuila; Mexico
- Frequency: 99.1 MHz
- Branding: La Mejor

Programming
- Format: Regional Mexican
- Affiliations: MVS Radio

Ownership
- Owner: Súper Medios de Coahuila and XH Medios (DBA: Grupo Multimedia - El Diario de Coahuila); (Master Radiodifusión, S.A. de C.V.)
- Sister stations: XHRE-FM

History
- First air date: August 10, 1983 (concession)

Technical information
- Licensing authority: CRT
- Class: A
- ERP: 3,000 watts
- HAAT: 58.68 m (192.5 ft)

Links
- Website: La Mejor Piedras Negras Website

XHSL-FM is a radio station in Piedras Negras, Coahuila. Broadcasting on 99.1 FM, XHSL is owned by Súper Medios de Coahuila and XH Medios and carries the national La Mejor format from MVS Radio.

== History ==
The concession for XHSL was issued on August 10, 1983, to Pedro A. Martínez Herrera. In 1993, the station was sold to María de los Ángeles Guerrero Villarreal, and then in the 2000s to Súper Medios.

In 2017, Súper Medios de Coahuila sold XHSL to Master Radiodifusión, S.A. de C.V. and sister XHRE to XHMED, S.A. de C.V. and, with the two stations remaining under common operation.
