= WANG =

Coordinates: 30°23′38″N 88°59′58″W

Simulcasts WOSM Ocean Springs
- Biloxi, Mississippi; United States
- Frequency: 1490 kHz
- Branding: Supertalk Mississippi

Programming
- Format: Talk radio
- Affiliations: Fox News Radio; Premiere Networks; Westwood One

Ownership
- Owner: Telesouth Communications Inc
- Sister stations: WXYK, WOSM, WCPR-FM, WGBL

History
- First air date: May 27, 1948
- Former call signs: WLOX (1948–1982); WBND (1982–1988); WMTX (1988–1989); WXLS (1989–1993); WXBD (1993–2018)

Technical information
- Licensing authority: FCC
- Facility ID: 37095
- Class: C
- Power: 1,000 watts unlimited
- Translator: 106.3 W292GD (Biloxi)

Links
- Public license information: Public file; LMS
- Webcast: Listen live
- Website: www.supertalk.fm/stations/gulf-coast-103-1

WANG (1490 AM) is a radio station licensed to Biloxi, Mississippi. Owned by Telesouth Communications, it broadcasts a talk radio format. The station was simulcast on 1640 WTNI, as well as translator station W292GD on 106.3 FM.

== History ==
WLOX announced its grand opening and began broadcasting on May 27, 1948 as an affiliate of the Mutual Broadcasting System.

In 2018, Alpha Media sold its Biloxi stations, including WANG, to Telesouth Communications. The sale was consummated on March 1, 2019, at a price of $2.5 million.

On March 8, 2019, WANG ended its sports format simulcast with WTNI, and changed its format to classic country, branded as "103.5 The Possum". In June 2019, WTNI ended the remaining sports programming and also flipped to classic country, by resuming its simulcast of WANG.

On December 22, 2020, translator station W278CE moved to 106.3, and WANG and WTNI flipped to a tourist information format as 106.3 Casino Radio. The stations primarily carry segments and advertising highlighting local casinos, restaurants, and other attractions in the Biloxi area.

On October 10, 2021 WANG and WTNI changed their formats from tourist information to adult hits, branded as "Bob 106.3".

In June 2024, WANG went silent. The station returned to the air in June 2025 with a talk format under the company’s "Supertalk Mississippi", simulcasting sister station 103.1 WOSM in Ocean Springs.

== Translator ==
Broadcast translator for WANG
Call sign	Frequency	City of license	FID	ERP (W)	HAAT	Class	FCC info
W292GD	106.3 FM	Biloxi, Mississippi	143076	250	115 m (377 ft)	D	LMS
