= KTDT-LP =

Low-power radio station in Tucson, Arizona

- Tucson, Arizona; United States
- Frequency: 99.1 MHz
- Branding: Downtown Radio

Programming
- Format: Community radio, Underground rock

Ownership
- Owner: LPFM Downtown Tucson

History
- First air date: September 2015
- Call sign meaning: TDT, Tucson, Downtown

Technical information
- Licensing authority: FCC
- Facility ID: 192159
- Class: L1
- ERP: 50 watts
- HAAT: -51 meters
- Transmitter coordinates: 33°13′38″N 110°58′23″W

Links
- Public license information: LMS
- Webcast: Listen live
- Website: downtownradio.org

KTDT-LP is a low-power FM radio station on 99.1 FM in Tucson, Arizona. Known as “Downtown Radio”, the station is owned and operated by LPFM Downtown Tucson, a non-profit LLC. The station format is rock Monday through Saturday and other genres, including talk, on Sunday. The purpose of the station is to provide an alternative to corporate radio and DJs have the freedom to play songs that aren't typically heard on corporate radio. Both the station and LLC were founded by Jason LeValley, who served as the executive director from its launch date of September 13, 2015, to December 30, 2019. The station is currently operated by an unpaid staff of over 50 volunteers, under the guidance of an all-volunteer board of directors.

== History ==
On March 13, 2013, LPFM Downtown Tucson became a legal entity, as recognized by the Arizona Corporation Commission. On November 3, 2014, KTDT-LP was granted its original construction permit, having managed to avoid a time-share situation with stations from the Tohono O'odham Nation and a Spanish language church called Iglesia Centro de Sanidad. A critical element for the station to get on air, the studio facilities, was donated by Sinfonía HealthCare. The station went live on September 13, 2015, which happened to coincide with LeValley's 50th birthday. It broadcasts rock music and a Sunday lineup of specialty programs. The station has been broadcasting from a location in the basement of the Steinfeld Warehouse since 2018.

In March 2020, in response to the global COVID-19 pandemic, Downtown Radio DJs and talk show hosts began remotely broadcasting from their homes, with 100% of live and prerecorded on-air content being delivered remotely until the studio's re-opening in July 2021. Under this remote-broadcast model, KTDT was able to expand its staff of DJs to include volunteers who broadcast from across the border, in recognition of Tucson's rich multicultural heritage.

== Programming ==
KTDT plays an eclectic mix of primarily rock-related genres, including those from independent artists, local bands and artists, and bands/musicians on major labels.

The styles of rock played vary and range from (but not limited to) rock & roll, college rock, punk rock, indie rock/alternative, underground rock, electronic rock, and hard rock/heavy metal. In addition, there are many specialty shows (mostly on weeknights and weekends) which focus on particular genres.

Additionally, there is a mental health component to the station's programming. Since its inception, the station has dedicated an hour each Sunday to address mental health issues with the goal of reducing the stigma associated with seeking help for mental and emotional health problems. The Depression Session, hosted by Laura Milkins, ran from November 22, 2015, through November 26th, 2018. Other mental health shows that have aired or are airing include Let's Talk About Mental Health, Mental Health Connection, and Heavy Mental.

== Funding ==
KTDT is a non-profit organization that operates under the corporation name LPFM Downtown Tucson and is designated as a Domestic Nonprofit Corporation, according to the Arizona Corporation Commission website.

Per its non-profit status, and due to FCC and grant regulations, KTDT doesn't air traditional radio commercials. Instead, KTDT's disc jockeys read or play recordings of underwriting spots that highlight the underwriters' businesses/events. The disc jockeys also share public service announcements that feature Tucson's local non-profits and their initiatives/events.

According to its website, “Community support is essential to Downtown Radio’s ability to continue entertaining and serving the community.” Memberships range from one-time gifts in any amount to monthly sustaining memberships in any amount.

== KTDT's Tucson Weekly Best of Tucson Awards ==
KTDT won Tucson Weekly's Best of Tucson awards for Best New Radio Station for 2016.
