= XHCMR-FM =

Radio station in Cuautla, Morelos, Mexico

- Cuautla, Morelos; Mexico
- Broadcast area: Cuernavaca, Morelos
- Frequency: 105.3 MHz
- Branding: Ke Buena

Programming
- Format: Regional Mexican
- Affiliations: Radiópolis

Ownership
- Owner: CapitalMedia; (María Cristina Romo Morales)
- Operator: Grupo Mundo Comunicaciones
- Sister stations: XHTIX-FM, XHJMG-FM

History
- First air date: October 15, 1987 (concession)
- Call sign meaning: Cuautla, Morelos

Technical information
- Class: B1
- ERP: 15 kW
- HAAT: 334.74 m
- Transmitter coordinates: 18°52′35″N 99°08′00″W

Links
- Website: kebuenacuernavaca.com

XHCMR-FM is a radio station on 105.3 FM in Cuautla, Morelos, licensed to Cuernavaca. It is owned by CapitalMedia and operated by Grupo Mundo Comunicaciones, and carries the Ke Buena Regional Mexican format from Radiópolis.

== History ==
XHCMR received its concession on October 15, 1987. It was owned by Jaime Morales Guillén until his death, at which time the station was transferred to its current concessionaire.

It was originally known as Estéreo Latina and was operated by Grupo Stereo Mundo until 2009, when Grupo Radiorama began operating XHCMR with the Ke Buena franchise Regional Mexican format from Televisa Radio. When Radiorama's family members split in 2013, resulting in the creation of separate clusters of Grupo Radiorama and Grupo Audiorama Comunicaciones, Ke Buena was moved to XHCM-FM 88.5. At that same time, CapitalMedia began operating the station with a pop format known as Capital FM.

On June 8, 2020, XHCMR was one of seven stations to debut the new Lokura FM Spanish-language adult hits brand. In January 2024, XHCMR abandoned the Lokura FM network and returned the Ke Buena brand to the frequency under the management of Corporativo Radiológico (owner of XHTIX-FM 100.1).
