= XHTMJ-FM =

Radio station in Tepatitlán de Morelos, Jalisco

- Tepatitlán de Morelos, Jalisco; Mexico
- Frequency: 99.1 FM
- Branding: Radio Aurora

Ownership
- Owner: Belisario Virgilio Alvarado Alvarado

History
- First air date: April 16, 2007 (permit)
- Call sign meaning: Tepatitlán de Morelos Jalisco

Technical information
- Licensing authority: CRT
- Class: A
- ERP: 3 kW
- HAAT: 63.5 m (208 ft)
- Transmitter coordinates: 20°50′47″N 102°44′11″W

XHTMJ-FM is a noncommercial radio station on 99.1 FM in Tepatitlán de Morelos, Jalisco, known as Radio Aurora.

== History ==
XHTMJ received its permit on April 16, 2007.
