= KOFH =

Radio station in Nogales, Arizona, United States

- Nogales, Arizona; United States
- Broadcast area: Nogales, Arizona, and Nogales, Sonora
- Frequency: 99.1 MHz
- Branding: Ovi 99.1

Programming
- Languages: English and Spanish
- Format: Mainstream rock

Ownership
- Owner: Felix Corporation

Technical information
- Licensing authority: FCC
- Facility ID: 21291
- Class: A
- ERP: 6,000 watts
- HAAT: 95 m (312 ft)
- Transmitter coordinates: 31°23′19″N 110°56′35″W

Links
- Public license information: Public file; LMS
- Webcast: Listen Live
- Website: ovi991.fm

KOFH (99.1 FM) is an American radio station broadcasting a mainstream rock format. It is licensed to Nogales, Arizona, United States. The station is currently owned by Felix Corporation.
