= WBZL (FM) =

- Greenwood, Mississippi; United States
- Broadcast area: Greenwood–Grenada–Indianola–Winona, Mississippi
- Frequency: 103.3 MHz
- Branding: G103.3

Programming
- Format: Classic hip hop

Ownership
- Owner: TeleSouth Communications Inc
- Sister stations: WTCD, WYMX

History
- First air date: August 26, 2010
- Former call signs: WBLZ (2008–2008)

Technical information
- Licensing authority: FCC
- Facility ID: 170950
- Class: C3
- Power: 25,000 watts
- HAAT: 78.8 meters (259 ft)
- Transmitter coordinates: 33°31′12.40″N 90°8′28.30″W

Links
- Public license information: Public file; LMS
- Webcast: Listen live

WBZL (103.3 MHz) is a classic hip hop formatted broadcast radio station. The station is licensed to Greenwood, Mississippi and serves Greenwood, Grenada, Indianola, and Winona in Mississippi. WBZL is owned and operated by Telesouth Communications Inc.
