= XHCUT-FM =

Radio station in Cuautla-Cuernavaca, Morelos

- Cuautla, Morelos; Mexico
- Broadcast area: Cuautla and Cuernavaca, Morelos
- Frequency: 101.7 FM
- Branding: La Comadre

Programming
- Format: Regional Mexican

Ownership
- Owner: Grupo Diario de Morelos; (Radio de Cuautla, S.A. de C.V.)
- Sister stations: XHMOR-FM

History
- First air date: December 9, 1993 (concession)
- Call sign meaning: CUauTla

Technical information
- Class: B
- ERP: 50 kW

Links
- Website: lacomadre1017.com

XHCUT-FM is a radio station on 101.7 FM in Cuautla, Morelos, primarily serving Cuernavaca. It is owned by Grupo Diario de Morelos and carries a Regional Mexican format known as La Comadre.

== History ==
XHCUT received its concession on December 9, 1993. It was initially owned by Federico Bracamontes Gálvez, founder of the Diario de Morelos newspaper. The two media remain co-owned.

Despite using the La Comadre name, this station is not owned by Grupo ACIR, which owns most of the stations using that name in Mexico.
