= WVVD-LP =

- Seffner, Florida; United States
- Frequency: 99.1 MHz

Ownership
- Owner: Iglesia Cristiana La Nueva Jerusalem

History
- Former frequencies: 96.5 MHz (2008–2016)

Technical information
- Licensing authority: FCC
- Facility ID: 135008
- Class: L1
- ERP: 60 watts
- HAAT: 40 meters (130 ft)
- Transmitter coordinates: 27°57′54.00″N 82°16′45.00″W

Links
- Public license information: LMS

WVVD-LP (99.1 FM) is a radio station licensed to Seffner, Florida, United States. The station is currently owned by Iglesia Cristiana La Nueva Jerusalem.
