= WIDE-LP =

- Madison, Wisconsin; United States
- Frequency: 99.1 MHz

Programming
- Language: English
- Format: Variety

Ownership
- Owner: Madison Mainstream Radio, Inc.

History
- First air date: 2007

Technical information
- Licensing authority: FCC
- Facility ID: 132183
- Class: L1
- ERP: 40 watts
- HAAT: 48 meters (157 ft)
- Transmitter coordinates: 43°03′07″N 89°27′23″W

Links
- Public license information: LMS
- Website: widelp.org

WIDE-LP (99.1 FM) is an American low-power FM radio station licensed to serve the community of Madison, Wisconsin. The station is owned and operated by the non-profit Madison Mainstream Radio, Inc.
