= KXMT =

Radio station in Taos, New Mexico

- Taos, New Mexico; United States
- Broadcast area: Northern New Mexico
- Frequency: 99.1 MHz
- Branding: Radio Éxitos (Radio Hits)

Programming
- Language: Spanish
- Format: Contemporary hit radio

Ownership
- Owner: Lorene Cino Gonzalez and Christopher Munoz; (L.M.N.O.C. Broadcasting LLC)

Technical information
- Licensing authority: FCC
- Facility ID: 18421
- Class: C
- ERP: 60,000 watts
- HAAT: 651 meters (2,136 ft)
- Transmitter coordinates: 36°51′32″N 106°0′28″W

Links
- Public license information: Public file; LMS
- Website: www.lmnocbroadcasting.com

KXMT (99.1 MHz) is a commercial FM radio station broadcasting a Spanish language contemporary hits radio format. Licensed to Taos, New Mexico, the station is currently owned by L.M.N.O.C. Broadcasting LLC.
