= WDJY-LP =

- Dallas, Georgia; United States
- Frequency: 99.1 MHz
- Branding: WDJY 99.1 FM

Programming
- Format: Talk radio

Ownership
- Owner: Hype Media Global Inc

Technical information
- Licensing authority: FCC
- Facility ID: 197433
- Class: L1
- ERP: 13 watts
- HAAT: 58 metres (190 ft)
- Transmitter coordinates: 33°55′16.60″N 84°46′32.60″W

Links
- Public license information: LMS
- Webcast: Listen Live
- Website: Official Website

WDJY-LP (99.1 FM) is a radio station licensed to serve the community of Dallas, Georgia. The station is owned by Hype Media Global Inc. It airs a talk radio format.

The station was assigned the WDJY-LP call letters by the Federal Communications Commission on February 13, 2014.
