= WGCM (AM) =

- Gulfport, Mississippi; United States
- Broadcast area: Gulfport–Biloxi metropolitan area
- Frequency: 1240 kHz
- Branding: The Hype 100.9

Programming
- Format: Rhythmic Throwbacks

Ownership
- Owner: Lisa Stiglets and Elizabeth McQueen; (JLE, Incorporated)
- Sister stations: WGCM-FM, WROA, WRPM, WZKX, WZNF

History
- First air date: 1928; 98 years ago
- Former call signs: WGCM (1928–1980); WTAM (1980–1987)
- Former frequencies: 1350 kHz (1928); 1210 kHz (1928–1941)
- Call sign meaning: Gulf Coast Music Co. (original owner)

Technical information
- Licensing authority: FCC
- Facility ID: 31216
- Class: C
- Power: 1,000 watts
- Transmitter coordinates: 30°25′45″N 89°01′10″W
- Translator: 100.9 W265DH (Gulfport)

Links
- Public license information: Public file; LMS
- Webcast: Listen live
- Website: hype1009.com

WGCM (1240 AM) is radio station licensed to Gulfport, Mississippi. It airs an Rhythmic format and is owned by Lisa Stiglets and Elizabeth McQueen, through licensee JLE, Incorporated.

== History ==
WGCM began broadcasting in 1928 and was owned by Gulf Coast Music Co. It briefly broadcast at 1350 kHz, before its frequency was changed to 1210 kHz later in 1928. Its frequency was changed to 1240 kHz in March 1941, as a result of the North American Regional Broadcasting Agreement. By 1944, WGCM had become an affiliate of the Blue Network, which would become the American Broadcasting Company in 1945.

In 1980, its call sign was changed to WTAM. The station aired an urban contemporary format as WTAM. Its call sign was changed back to WGCM in 1987, and it adopted a country music format. By 1990, the station had adopted to an adult standards format. By 1994, it had switched to a sports format. In 1995, it adopted a classic country format. In 2016, the station began to be simulcast on a translator at 100.9 MHz, and it adopted an oldies format branded "Cruisin' WGCM".

In October 2025, the station dropped the Oldies format and picked up the Rhythmic Throwbacks format that previously aired on the HD3 subchannel of WZKX. At the same time, "Cruisin' Oldies" has moved online.

== Translator ==
WGCM is also heard at 100.9 MHz, through a translator in Gulfport, Mississippi.

Broadcast translator for WGCM
Call sign	Frequency	City of license	FID	ERP (W)	HAAT	Class	FCC info
W265DH	100.9 FM	Gulfport, Mississippi	149152	250	115 m (377 ft)	D	LMS
