= WGCM-FM =

- Gulfport, Mississippi; United States
- Broadcast area: Gulfport-Biloxi
- Frequency: 102.3 MHz
- Branding: Coast 102

Programming
- Language: English
- Format: Classic hits

Ownership
- Owner: Lisa Stiglets and Elizabeth McQueen; (JLE, Incorporated)
- Sister stations: WGCM, WROA, WRPM, WZKX, WZNF

History
- First air date: November 14, 1969; 56 years ago
- Former call signs: WTKI-FM (1988-1990)
- Call sign meaning: Gulf Coast Mississippi

Technical information
- Licensing authority: FCC
- Facility ID: 19070
- Class: C2
- ERP: 50,000 watts
- HAAT: 120 meters (394 feet)
- Transmitter coordinates: 30°20′44.70″N 89°11′47.10″W

Links
- Public license information: Public file; LMS
- Webcast: Listen live
- Website: coast102.com

WGCM-FM (102.3 FM, "Coast 102"), is a classic hits formatted radio station licensed to Gulfport, Mississippi, United States and serving the Mississippi Gulf Coast. The station is owned by Lisa Stiglets and Elizabeth McQueen, through licensee JLE, Incorporated.

== Signal ==
WGCM-FM's 394-foot tower with a 50,000 watt signal can reach east to Pascagoula, Mississippi, west to Slidell, Louisiana, and north to Wiggins, Mississippi. The transmitter tower is located on the Pass Christian and Long Beach, Mississippi, city limits line.

== History ==
WGCM-FM signed on September 14, 1969. WGCM-FM had a country format in the early-to-mid-1980s. In September 1988, the call sign was changed to WTKI-FM and the format was changed to album-oriented rock (AOR) as "TK 102". In late 1989, the station became "Coast 102" when the format was flipped to 1950s-1970s oldies, and eventually "Greatest Hits of All Time" (1960s-1980s pop), its current format. The call sign was changed back to WGCM-FM in January 1990.
