= KDWD =

Radio station in Marceline, Missouri

- Marceline, Missouri; United States
- Broadcast area: Brookfield, Missouri
- Frequency: 99.1 MHz
- Branding: My Country 99.1

Programming
- Format: Country music

Ownership
- Owner: Aaron Ervie; (Main Street USA Communications, LLC)

Technical information
- Licensing authority: FCC
- Facility ID: 171000
- Class: C3
- ERP: 4,200 watts
- HAAT: 130 meters (430 ft)
- Transmitter coordinates: 39°42′27″N 92°57′30″W

Links
- Public license information: Public file; LMS
- Webcast: Listen live
- Website: mycountry991.com

KDWD is a radio station airing a country music format licensed to Marceline, Missouri, broadcasting on 99.1 FM. The station is owned by Aaron Ervie, through licensee Main Street USA Communications, LLC.
