= XHUAEM-FM =

Radio station of the Universidad Autónoma del Estado de Morelos

Cuernavaca, Morelos, Mexico; Mexico
- Broadcast area: Morelos
- Frequency: 106.1 MHz
- Branding: Radio UAEM

Programming
- Format: University radio

Ownership
- Owner: Universidad Autónoma del Estado de Morelos

History
- First air date: July 14, 2000
- Call sign meaning: Universidad Autónoma del Estado de Morelos

Technical information
- Class: AA
- ERP: 3.84 kW
- HAAT: 189.06 m
- Transmitter coordinates: 18°58′55.7″N 99°14′09.8″W

Links
- Website: www.uaem.mx/difusion-y-medios/medios/radio/

XHUAEM-FM, known as Radio UAEM, is a radio station serving Cuernavaca, Morelos. It is owned by the Universidad Autónoma del Estado de Morelos and has statewide coverage with repeaters installed at the UAEM preparatory schools in Jojutla and Cuautla.

== History ==
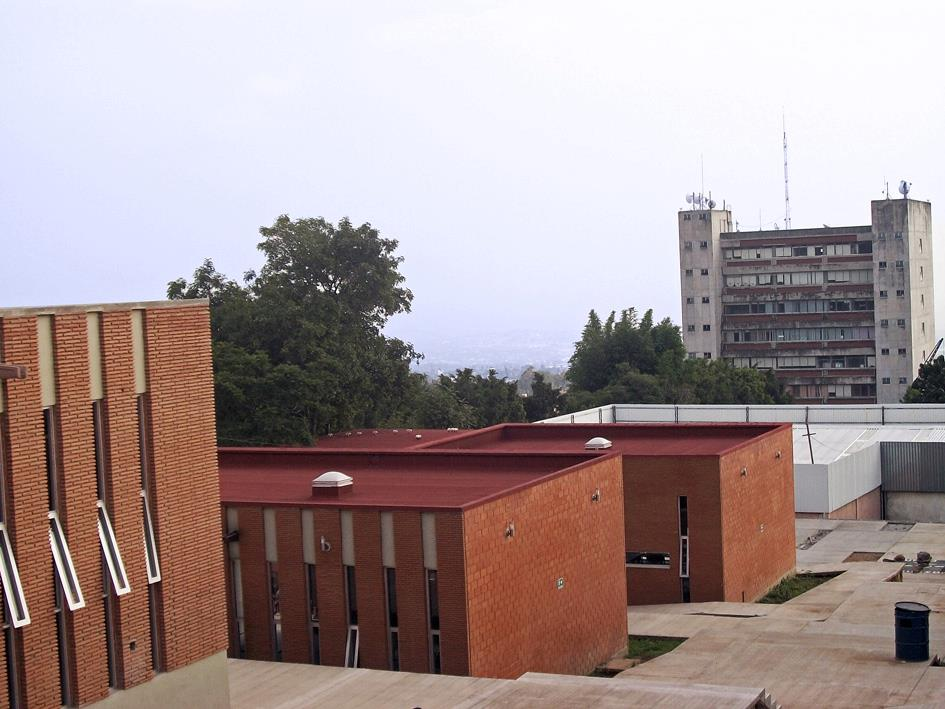
The XHUAEM-FM transmitter atop the UAEM Rectory Building

XHUAEM-FM received its permit in February 2000 and signed on July 14 of that year. The additional permits were received later in 2000; XHCUM-FM Cuautla launched on August 14, 2003, and XHJJM-FM in Jojutla took to the air on January 24, 2005.

Radio UAEM was launched under rector Gerardo Ávila García and founding station director Francisco Orozco Jiménez. After René Santoveña Arredondo was elected UAEM rector in December 2000, the station became known as UFM Alterna, a moniker that would be used until 2013 when it returned to "Radio UAEM" in a bid to emphasize its connection with the university.

The new university outlet broadcast classical and alternative music, alongside a variety of locally produced and internationally sourced programs from Radio Francia Internacional, Radio Netherlands Worldwide and Radio Bilingüe in the United States. In 2008, the station moved to new studios in Building 40 on the north campus.

== Programming ==
Radio UAEM, like other university stations in Mexico, presents a mix of music and talk programs. The station broadcasts classical music from 9 a.m. to noon on weekdays as well as several specialty classical shows. Radio UAEM's own productions address varied topics including literature, sports and migration; the station also produces two editions of Panorama, a newscast, each weekday. Through exchange agreements, programs from Radio Educación, Radio UNAM and the Instituto Mexicano de la Radio are also aired.

== Repeaters ==
Callsign	Frequency	City	ERP	HAAT
XHCUM-FM	89.7	Cuautla	.5 kW	-1.07 m
XHJJM-FM	91.9	Jojutla	.5 kW	-67.31 m
