= WIEH-LP =

- Marietta, Georgia; United States
- Broadcast area: Eastern Cobb County, Georgia (NNW of Atlanta)
- Frequency: 99.1 MHz
- Branding: MSBN FM

Programming
- Format: Christian radio (Portuguese)

Ownership
- Owner: Semeadores de Boas Novas

History
- First air date: June 2015

Technical information
- Licensing authority: FCC
- Facility ID: 195127
- Class: L1
- ERP: 30 watts
- HAAT: 53.2 m (175 ft)
- Transmitter coordinates: 34°2′35.64″N 84°28′19.25″W

Links
- Public license information: LMS
- Website: Official Website

WIEH-LP 99.1 is an LPFM radio station licensed to serve Marietta, Georgia, United States. The broadcast licensee is Ministério Semeadores de Boas Novas (MSBN), which translates to "Sowers of Good News Ministry", part of the Assembleia de Deus (Assembly of God) church in Marietta.

First going on-air in June 2015, it has a Christian radio format similar to WFSH-FM 104.7 plus some talk, but broadcasts primarily in Portuguese, with some songs in English. While the station primarily reaches northeast Cobb, the target demographic is the significant Brazilian population around the southeastern edge of Marietta (roughly around Delk Road and Powers Ferry Road). It transmits from a cell tower on land leased from the campus of Lassiter High School, near the boundary with Harrison Park.
