= KRUP =

Coordinates: 59.041°N 158.524°W

- Dillingham, Alaska; United States
- Broadcast area: Alaska Bush
- Frequency: 99.1 MHz
- Branding: 99.1 KRUP

Programming
- Format: Talk

Ownership
- Owner: Steve Strait; (Strait Media LLC)

Technical information
- Licensing authority: FCC
- Facility ID: 40842
- Class: A
- ERP: 6,000 watts
- HAAT: 39 meters

Links
- Public license information: Public file; LMS

KRUP is a commercial radio station programming talk in Dillingham, Alaska, broadcasting on 99.1 FM.
