= WJNV =

- Jonesville, Virginia; United States
- Broadcast area: Jonesville, Virginia; Pennington Gap, Virginia; Sneedville, Tennessee
- Frequency: 99.1 MHz
- Branding: J-99

Programming
- Format: Country

Ownership
- Owner: Regina Kay Moore

History
- First air date: 2000
- Call sign meaning: "Jonesville"

Technical information
- Licensing authority: FCC
- Facility ID: 78986
- Class: A
- ERP: 4,000 watts
- HAAT: 123 meters (404 ft)
- Transmitter coordinates: 36°42′5.0″N 83°10′14.0″W

Links
- Public license information: Public file; LMS

WJNV is a Country-formatted broadcast radio station licensed to Jonesville, Virginia, serving Jonesville and Pennington Gap in Virginia and Sneedville in Tennessee. WJNV is owned and operated by Regina Kay Moore.
