= XHMOR-FM =

Radio station in Yautepec-Cuernavaca, Morelos

- Yautepec, Morelos; Mexico
- Broadcast area: Yautepec and Cuernavaca, Morelos
- Frequency: 99.1 FM
- Branding: La 99

Programming
- Format: Regional Mexican and pop music in English and Spanish

Ownership
- Owner: Grupo Diario de Morelos; (Radio XHMOR, S.A. de C.V.)
- Sister stations: XHCUT-FM

History
- First air date: October 29, 1992 (concession)
- Call sign meaning: MORelos

Technical information
- Class: C1
- ERP: 98.78 kW

Links
- Website: www.la99.com

XHMOR-FM is a radio station on 99.1 FM in Yautepec, Morelos, primarily serving Cuernavaca. It is owned by Grupo Diario de Morelos and carries a Regional Mexican format and a pop music format in English and Spanish known as La 99.

== History ==
XHMOR received its concession on October 29, 1992. It was initially owned by Federico Bracamontes Gálvez, founder of the Diario de Morelos newspaper. The two media remain co-owned.

This station was previously known as Mix 99.1 with an English-language classic hits format.
