= WWSX-LP =

- Rehoboth Beach, Delaware; United States
- Frequency: 99.1 MHz
- Branding: Radio Rehoboth

Programming
- Format: Adult album alternative
- Affiliations: Pacifica Radio Network

Ownership
- Owner: East Sussex Public Broadcasting Company, Inc.

Technical information
- Licensing authority: FCC
- Facility ID: 192939
- ERP: 100 watts
- HAAT: 9 metres (30 ft)
- Transmitter coordinates: 38°42′48.4″N 75°05′42.6″W

Links
- Public license information: LMS
- Webcast: Listen live
- Website: radiorehoboth.com

WWSX-LP (99.1 FM, "Radio Rehoboth") is a radio station licensed to serve the community of Rehoboth Beach, Delaware. The station is owned by East Sussex Public Broadcasting Company, Inc. It airs an adult album alternative format.

The station was assigned the WWSX-LP call letters by the Federal Communications Commission on October 23, 2014.
