= WQFX (AM) =

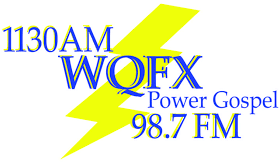
- Gulfport, Mississippi; United States
- Broadcast area: Gulfport-Biloxi metropolitan area
- Frequency: 1130 kHz
- Branding: My Power Gospel

Programming
- Format: Gospel music

Ownership
- Owner: Walking by Faith Ministries, Inc.

History
- First air date: May 7, 1975
- Former call signs: WGUF (1976–1985); WAIZ (1985–1986)
- Call sign meaning: From former "Foxy 96" name of the formerly co-owned FM

Technical information
- Licensing authority: FCC
- Facility ID: 61306
- Class: D
- Power: 1,000 watts (daytime only)
- Transmitter coordinates: 30°23′21″N 89°06′23″W
- Translator: W254DJ (98.7 MHz) Gulfport

Links
- Public license information: Public file; LMS
- Website: www.mypowergospel.com

WQFX (1130 AM) is a radio station in Gulfport, Mississippi, United States, broadcasting a gospel music format. It is owned by Walking by Faith Ministries, Inc., and operates from studios in nearby Biloxi and a transmitter in Gulfport. 1130 kHz is a clear-channel frequency shared by three North American stations (CKWX, KWKH, and WBBR), requiring WQFX to operate on a daytime-only basis on the AM band. The station also broadcasts on an FM translator, W254DJ (98.7 FM), which allows it to broadcast around-the-clock, including when the AM facility cannot be active.

Established as a commercial station in 1975, by 1986, it became a simulcast of its sister FM station, WQFX-FM 96.7. In 1992, the simulcast was broken and the station leased—and later bought—by its present owner to broadcast the current gospel format.

== History ==
On May 8, 1974, the Federal Communications Commission (FCC) awarded a construction permit to Robert Barber, Jr., George Sliman, and F. M. Smith, doing business as the Gulf Broadcasting Company, for a new 500-watt daytime-only radio station on 1130 kHz at Gulfport. It had been a long wait for the trio to get the permit, having filed their application in 1969 but having to wait through a comparative hearing process to get the frequency. WGUF went on the air May 7, 1975, with a country music format. Two years later, the same group launched WGUF-FM 96.7; Holton Turnbough bought full ownership of both stations in 1979. The country format was jettisoned in 1983 in favor of all-news, utilizing the programming of CNN Radio with local reporters and inserts.

WGUF, Inc., Turnbough's company, filed to sell the AM and FM stations to Joyner Communications in August 1984, but the Joyner transaction fell through, leading to a second and successful sale to Caravelle Broadcast Group of Mississippi that October. Even after the sale, however, Turnbough and Broadcast Music, Inc., a performing rights organization, maintained a legal feud over back royalty payments owed for music played on the WGUF stations. Turnbough had a policy of purposely being behind on royalty payments, telling a Sun Herald reporter, "I always paid my bills late on purpose. I just don't like copyright fees. I don't think they give all the money to the people they're supposed to give it to."

On January 1, 1985, the two stations relaunched with new programming and separate call letters: the FM became WQFX "Foxy 96", an urban contemporary station, while the AM changed to WAIZ "Big WAIZ Country". The country station proved a poor ratings performer in a market with a glut of similar stations and changed to an oldies format at the start of 1986, using the same WQFX call sign as the FM.

Steere Broadcasting of Kalamazoo, Michigan, acquired WQFX-AM-FM for $1.25 million in 1986. The AM then began to simulcast the FM.

After a proposed $47,500 sale of the AM in May 1991 never materialized, Steere tried to sell the WQFX stations to Urban Media Group in December 1991 for $500,000; the sale price consisted solely of promissory notes to Caravelle and Turnbough's estate. However, this sale also did not close. As Steere steered toward bankruptcy, in 1992, Faith Tabernacle of Praise in Biloxi began operating the station as a gospel music outlet, part of a larger mission to start new Black-owned businesses in the area; the station's studios moved from Gulfport to a former church office in Biloxi. The church would not own the station for several more years. In 1993, a bankruptcy trustee sold WQFX-AM-FM to Southern Horizons Broadcasting Corporation; the FM station, which had continued under Steere operation, was described as "in turmoil" by its new owner. Walking by Faith Ministries purchased WQFX, after four years of managing it, for $34,000 in 1996. By 2004, the station featured recorded and live church services from around 50 churches.
