= WCNA =

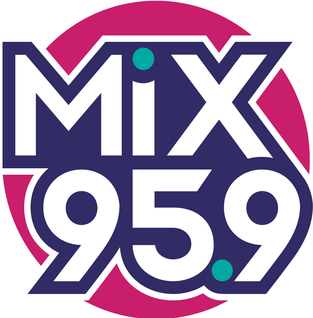
- Potts Camp, Mississippi; United States
- Broadcast area: Tupelo, Mississippi
- Frequency: 95.9 MHz
- Branding: Mix 95.9

Programming
- Format: Adult contemporary
- Affiliations: ABC Radio

Ownership
- Owner: Stephen C. Davenport; (Telesouth Communications, Inc.)

History
- First air date: 1996

Technical information
- Licensing authority: FCC
- Facility ID: 50294
- Class: C3
- ERP: 14,000 watts
- HAAT: 133 meters (436 ft)
- Transmitter coordinates: 34°35′51″N 89°06′12″W

Links
- Public license information: Public file; LMS
- Webcast: Listen live
- Website: 959tupelo.com

WCNA (95.9 FM, "Mix 95.9") is a radio station licensed to the community of Potts Camp, Mississippi, United States, and serving the Tupelo, Mississippi, area. The station is owned by Stephen C. Davenport, through licensee Telesouth Communications Inc.

WCNA "Mix 95.9" airs an adult contemporary format. WCNA's signal can be heard from Bolivar, Tennessee, to Houston, Mississippi, and from Olive Branch, Mississippi, to Red Bay, Alabama.

The station was assigned the WCNA call letters by the Federal Communications Commission on February 17, 1995.

In June 2019, WCNA changed their format from talk to hot adult contemporary, branded as "Mix 95.9".
