= KNES =

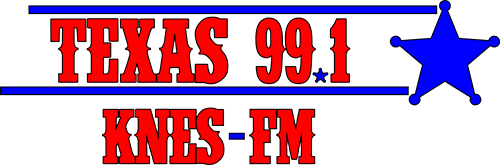
- Fairfield, Texas; United States
- Broadcast area: Freestone, Limestone, Leon, Anderson, and Navarro County
- Frequency: 99.1 MHz
- Branding: Texas 99.1

Programming
- Format: Country music
- Affiliations: Texas State Network

Ownership
- Owner: J&J Communications, Inc.

History
- First air date: July 22, 1983 (Construction Permit Granted); September 18, 1985 (On-Air)

Technical information
- Licensing authority: FCC
- Facility ID: 22620
- Class: C3
- ERP: 11,500 watts
- HAAT: 147.0 meters (482.3 ft)
- Transmitter coordinates: 31°40′55″N 96°1′22″W

Links
- Public license information: Public file; LMS
- Webcast: Listen live
- Website: Official website

KNES (99.1 FM, "Texas 99") is a terrestrial FM radio station broadcasting Country music. Licensed to Fairfield, Texas, United States, the station serves Freestone County, Limestone County, Leon County, Anderson County and Navarro County. The station is currently owned by J&J Communications, Inc.

KNES studio is located off of U.S. 84 in Fairfield, Texas. The transmission site for KNES is also located off U.S. 84, 1.5 miles east of Turlington.

On July 22, 2019, J&J Communications filed paperwork with the Federal Communications Commission to transfer the station to Lazy Bottom Broadcasting. The sale never closed.
