= XHTIX-FM =

Radio station in Cuernavaca, Morelos, Mexico

- Temixco, Morelos; Mexico
- Broadcast area: Cuernavaca
- Frequency: 100.1 MHz
- Branding: VOX Radio Hits

Programming
- Format: Adult Contemporary
- Affiliations: Radiópolis

Ownership
- Owner: Corporación Radiológico, S.A. de C.V.
- Operator: Grupo Mundo Comunicaciones
- Sister stations: XHCMR-FM, XHJMG-FM

History
- First air date: November 3, 1994 (concession)
- Call sign meaning: Temixco

Technical information
- Class: B1
- ERP: 15 kW

Links
- Webcast: Listen live
- Website: voxcuernavaca.com

XHTIX-FM is a radio station on 100.1 FM in Temixco, Morelos, Mexico, primarily serving Cuernavaca. carries the Vox Radio Hits adult contemporary format from Radiópolis.

== History ==
XHTIX received its concession on November 3, 1994. It was originally known as Factor 100 and later W Radical; when that format was abandoned on XEW-FM in Mexico City, it became known as Radiológico in the early 2000s. It was owned by Stella Generosa Mejido Hernández until 2012.

In 2020, XHTIX affiliated with Radiópolis and began airing W Radio programming. The Radiológico name was modified to Radiológico W and then to W Radio in 2021.
