= KORE-LP =

- Entiat, Washington; United States
- Frequency: 99.1 MHz
- Branding: KORE-LP 99.1 \ 105.9

Programming
- Format: Variety

Ownership
- Owner: Community Oriented Radio Endeavours

Technical information
- Licensing authority: FCC
- Facility ID: 192799
- Class: L1
- ERP: 100 watts
- HAAT: −270 metres (−890 ft)
- Transmitter coordinates: 47°39′36″N 120°11′37″W
- Translators: K288GN (105.5 MHz, Chelan); K290CH 105.9 MHz, Wenatchee)

Links
- Public license information: LMS
- Webcast: Listen Live
- Website: Official Website

KORE-LP (99.1 FM) is a radio station licensed to serve the community of Entiat, Washington. The station is owned by Community Oriented Radio Endeavours. It airs a variety radio format.

After a letter of permission to use the call letters was given by then KORE-AM Station Owner Larry Knight, the station was assigned the KORE-LP call letters by the Federal Communications Commission on February 4, 2014.
