= KFMM =

- Virden, New Mexico; United States
- Broadcast area: Safford, Arizona
- Frequency: 99.1 MHz
- Branding: The Planet

Programming
- Format: Classic rock

Ownership
- Owner: Cochise Broadcasting LLC

History
- First air date: April 12, 1982

Technical information
- Licensing authority: FCC
- Facility ID: 72368
- Class: C
- ERP: 3,900 watts
- HAAT: 701 meters
- Transmitter coordinates: 32°53′22″N 109°19′25″W

Links
- Public license information: Public file; LMS

KFMM (99.1 FM) is a radio station broadcasting a Classic rock format. Licensed to Virden, New Mexico, United States, the station is owned by Cochise Broadcasting LLC.
