= WGBL =

Coordinates: 30.459°N 89.079°W

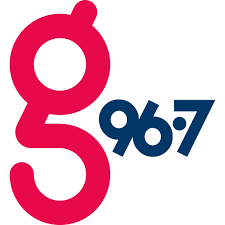
- Gulfport, Mississippi; United States
- Broadcast area: Biloxi-Gulfport, Mississippi
- Frequency: 96.7 MHz
- Branding: g 96.7

Programming
- Language: English
- Format: Classic hip-hop
- Affiliations: Premiere Networks

Ownership
- Owner: Stephen Davenport; (Telesouth Communications, Inc.)
- Sister stations: WXYK, WOSM, WCPR-FM, WANG

History
- First air date: 1977
- Former call signs: WGUF-FM (1977–1985); WQFX (1985–1986); WQFX-FM (1986–1993); WXRG (1993–1997); WLRK (1997–1999); WUJM (1999–2014)
- Call sign meaning: "Gulfport Bull", from previous branding; also Gulfport-Biloxi

Technical information
- Licensing authority: FCC
- Facility ID: 61305
- Class: A
- ERP: 4,300 watts
- HAAT: 119 meters (390 feet)

Links
- Public license information: Public file; LMS
- Webcast: Listen Live
- Website: g967gulfcoast.com

WGBL (96.7 FM, "G96-7") is a radio station based in Gulfport–Biloxi, Mississippi broadcasting a classic hip-hop format and new hip-hop. The station is owned by Telesouth Communications, Inc. and broadcasts their format with an ERP of 4.3 kW. WGBL broadcasts from the same transmitter tower as former sister station, WLGF, in Orange Grove.

== History ==
On December 20, 1976, after a comparative hearing, WGUF, Inc., owners of WGUF (1130 AM), received a construction permit from the Federal Communications Commission (FCC) for a new radio station to serve Gulfport on the FM band. WGUF-FM debuted on July 13, 1977, with a beautiful music format, complementing the AM's country music programming. By 1983, this had evolved into an adult contemporary format.

WGUF, Inc., Turnbough's company, filed to sell the AM and FM stations to Joyner Communications in August 1984, but the Joyner transaction fell through, leading to a second and successful sale to Caravelle Broadcast Group of Mississippi that October. Even after the sale, however, Turnbough and Broadcast Music, Inc., a performing rights organization, maintained a legal feud over back royalty payments owed for music played on the WGUF stations. Turnbough had a policy of purposely being behind on royalty payments, telling a Sun Herald reporter, "I always paid my bills late on purpose. I just don't like copyright fees. I don't think they give all the money to the people they're supposed to give it to."

On January 1, 1985, Caravelle relaunched the WGUF stations, giving both new call letters and separate programming: the FM became WQFX "Foxy 96", an urban contemporary station, while the AM changed to WAIZ "Big WAIZ Country". The country station proved a poor ratings performer in a market with a glut of similar stations and changed to an oldies format at the start of 1986, using the same WQFX call sign as the FM, and became a full-time simulcast of WQFX-FM after Steere Broadcasting of Kalamazoo, Michigan, acquired the pair for $1.25 million.

In the early 1990s, Steere entered into financial troubles that ended with a bankruptcy sale of both stations to Southern Horizons Broadcasting Corporation, owner of WXLS-AM-FM in Biloxi. The FM station, which had evolved to adult contemporary as "Mix 96", was described as "in turmoil" by its new owner; it began stunting, operations were moved in with WXLS in Biloxi, and its few staff were required to interview for positions with Southern Horizons.

In March 1993, Southern Horizons relaunched 96.7 as WXRG "Rock 96.7". However, loose ends continued from the Steere bankruptcy; one of the owners of Caravelle, Roger McBride, attempted to sue for ownership, and the equipment had been poorly maintained and had a high failure rate.

In January 1997, Southern Horizons reached a deal to sell its four stations to Gulf Coast Radio Partners, which had previously assumed management control. A major shuffle of formats and frequencies followed, with WXRG moving to 105.9 MHz and the adult contemporary sounds of WXLS moving to become WLRK "Lite Rock 96.7". The format proved to be unsuccessful, and in September 1999, the station flipped to the popular rhythmic oldies format as WUJM "Jammin' Oldies 96.7".

=== Molly @ 96.7/Hank-FM ===
In 2001, the "jammin' oldies" format was dropped, and WUJM flipped to hot adult contemporary as "Molly @ 96.7". The station proved to be quite successful for a few years until March 2005 when the station dropped the format for Classic Country as "96.7 Hank-FM" with the popular John Boy & Billy show in mornings.

=== 96.7 The Champ ===
On August 27, 2011, WUJM dumped its classic country programming and began stunting with a loop of Gary Glitter's Rock and Roll, Part 2. On August 29, 2011, the station flipped to Sports Talk as "96-7 The Champ" with most of its programming coming from ESPN Radio. Matt Segal hosted mornings, while Johnny "Ballpark" Franks was the afternoon drive host. Segal left the Biloxi/Gulfport market in February 2013.

In July 2014, station owner Triad Broadcasting was sold to Alpha Media along with sister stations WCPR, WXYK, WQBB, and WTNI.

=== 96-7 The Bull ===
When afternoon host Johnny "Ballpark" Franks left in early August 2014 to be the afternoon host for a Nashville sports station, "96.7 the Champ" lost its foundation to the local market along with loyal advertisers. So, on September 3, 2014, The Champ moved exclusively to former simulcasters WXBD and WTNI as 96.7 began stunting with a robotic countdown, using the same Microsoft Sam voice used by WQBB in 2010 counting down to September 5 at 5 p.m. At that time, 96.7 flipped to Country as "96-7 The Bull". The station launched with 10,000 songs in a row commercial free with the first song being American Kids by Kenny Chesney. It was also announced that radio vet Mark "Tic Tak" Allen would program the station. On September 10, 2014, the station changed its call letters to WGBL to match The Bull branding.

On January 5, 2015, The Bull added popular syndicated show Rick & Bubba for mornings.

=== G96-7 ===
On February 13, 2016, at 9 p.m., WGBL dropped the country format during the syndicated Buckwild Saturday Night show and began stunting with a simulcast of sister station WXYK "107-1 The Monkey". The country format had only achieved a 1.1 rating, a distant third behind two other stations in the market. The following afternoon at 5 p.m., the station flipped to classic hip-hop as G96-7.

In December 2018, Alpha Media announced that it would sell its Gulf Coast cluster to local Mississippi broadcast company Telesouth Communications, Inc., who already owns WOSM, the Biloxi affiliate of its Supertalk Mississippi network in the market. The FCC approved the $2.5 million sale on February 12, 2019, and it closed on March 1, 2019.
