= XHCU-FM =

Radio station in Cuautla, Morelos

- Cuautla, Morelos; Mexico
- Frequency: 104.5 FM
- Branding: La Bestia Grupera

Programming
- Format: Regional Mexican

Ownership
- Owner: Grupo Audiorama Comunicaciones; (XHCU-FM, S.A. de C.V.)
- Sister stations: XHCM-FM, XHNG-FM

History
- First air date: April 11, 1980 (concession)
- Call sign meaning: "Cuautla"

Technical information
- ERP: 59.64 kW

Links
- Webcast: Listen live
- Website: audiorama.mx

XHCU-FM is a radio station on 104.5 FM in Cuautla, Morelos. It is owned by Grupo Audiorama Comunicaciones and carries a Regional Mexican format known as La Bestia Grupera.

== History ==
XHCU received its concession on April 11, 1980. It was initially known as Estereo Armonía, until the purchase of the station by Radiorama in the 2000s, at which time it rebranded as La Tremenda. In 2013, when Radiorama and Audiorama split, the current La Bestia Grupera name was adopted.
