= WVIC-LP =

- Saint Paul, Minnesota; United States
- Frequency: 99.1 MHz

Programming
- Format: Variety

Ownership
- Owner: Victoria Theatre Project

History
- First air date: 2019

Technical information
- Licensing authority: FCC
- Facility ID: 196635
- Class: L1
- ERP: 100 watts
- HAAT: 30 meters (98 ft)
- Transmitter coordinates: 44°57′17.9″N 93°02′32.8″W

Links
- Public license information: LMS
- Website: wvicradio.org

WVIC-LP is a variety formatted low-power broadcast radio station licensed to Saint Paul, Minnesota, serving portions of the eastside of St. Paul and Maplewood. The station is owned by the Victoria Theatre Project.

The Victoria Theater, over a century old, is located on University Avenue in the Frogtown neighborhood of St. Paul. The studios of the station are to be located inside the structure, which is in the process of being converted to a functioning theater and community center. The theater is still under reconstruction as of April, 2024.

The station has a relationship with KPPS-LP 97.5 FM St. Louis Park.

The station's transmitter is located atop a high rise adjacent to Interstate 94 near Johnson Parkway on St. Paul's east side. The station can be heard well as far west as Dale Street in St. Paul, and as far east as Woodbury. The station covers nearly all of Maplewood, and Oakdale.
