= WOXF =

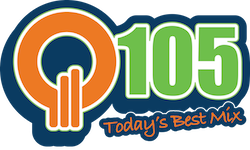
- Oxford, Mississippi; United States
- Broadcast area: Thaxton, Mississippi
- Frequency: 105.1 MHz
- Branding: Q105

Programming
- Language: English
- Format: Hot adult contemporary

Ownership
- Owner: Telesouth Communications Inc
- Sister stations: WQLJ

History
- First air date: 2014
- Call sign meaning: W OXFord

Technical information
- Licensing authority: FCC
- Facility ID: 84091
- Class: A
- ERP: 1,600 watts
- HAAT: 142 meters (466 ft)
- Transmitter coordinates: 34°25′24.9″N 89°30′53.5″W

Links
- Public license information: Public file; LMS
- Webcast: Listen Live
- Website: theq105.com

WOXF (105.1 FM, "Q105") is an American radio station licensed to serve the community of Oxford, Mississippi. WOXF broadcasts a hot adult contemporary music format to the Oxford area.

WOXF is owned by Telesouth Communications Inc.
