= XHVACM-FM =

Radio station in Cuernavaca, Morelos, Mexico

- Cuernavaca, Morelos; Mexico
- Frequency: 102.9 FM
- Branding: Universal Sónica

Programming
- Format: Public radio

Ownership
- Owner: Gobierno del Estado de Morelos
- Operator: Instituto Morelense de Radio y Televisión (IMRyT)
- Sister stations: XHJLAM-FM, XHYTEM-FM, XECTAM-AM, XHCMO-TDT

History
- First air date: February 4, 1985
- Call sign meaning: Cuernavaca, Morelos

Technical information
- ERP: 7.3 kW
- Transmitter coordinates: 25°34′00″N 103°28′00″W

Links
- Webcast: Listen live
- Website: imryt.org

XHVACM-FM, known as Universal Sónica, is a public station on 102.9 FM in Cuernavaca, Morelos, Mexico. The station is owned by the state government through the Instituto Morelense de Radio y Televisión (IMRyT).

== History ==
The state network of Morelos took form in 1985. On February 4, XHVAC-FM "Universal Stereo" took to the air on 102.9 FM after testing throughout January. The next day, the Yautepec station, XHYTE-FM 90.9 "Estéreo Campesina" came to air. On June 1, the Jojutla station, XHJLA-FM "Viva FM" signed on, and on November 19, the state network was completed on AM with XECTA-AM 1390 "Radio Líder" in Cuautla. In 1989, the stations received proper permits.

In the late 1990s, after the dissolution of the Morelos Radio and Television System (SMRTV), technical deterioration set in. XHVAC's dated transmitter began to fade, and the other stations each remained off air for long stretches of time and relayed it at other times. SMRTV was reformed in 2000, but it was not until 2012 and its transformation into the autonomous IMRyT that the stations improved.

In July 2022, the service changed its name from La Radio de Morelos to Universal Sónica.

== Transmitters ==
Call sign	Frequency	City	ERP
XHJLAM-FM	100.5	Jojutla	1.9 kW
XHYTEM-FM	90.9	Yautepec	1.9 kW
XECTAM-AM	1390	Cuautla	1 kW day 0.25 kW night

The transmitters all had an M added to their call signs in 2013 when they received new permits.
