= WCFY-LP =

Evansville, Indiana; United States
- Broadcast area: Evansville
- Frequency: 99.1 MHz

Programming
- Format: Christian contemporary

Ownership
- Owner: Christian Fellowship Church Inc

History
- Former frequencies: 102.7 MHz (2005–2014)

Technical information
- Licensing authority: FCC
- Facility ID: 124387
- Class: L1
- ERP: 100 watts
- HAAT: 26.0 meters (85.3 ft)
- Transmitter coordinates: 38°1′51.00″N 87°29′56.00″W

Links
- Public license information: LMS
- Website: www.99thebridge.org

WCFY-LP (99.1 FM) is a radio station broadcasting a Christian contemporary radio format. Licensed to Evansville, Indiana, United States, the station serves the Evansville area. The station is currently owned by Christian Fellowship Church Inc.

The station originally broadcast on 102.7 FM, but was allowed to change frequencies in early 2009 due to interference from nearby low-power stations broadcasting on 102.7 FM. The license for this frequency change was not issued by the FCC until October 14, 2014.
