= WQLJ =

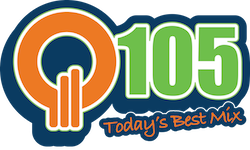
- Water Valley, Mississippi; United States
- Broadcast area: Batesville, Mississippi; Oxford, Mississippi
- Frequency: 105.5 MHz
- Branding: Q105

Programming
- Format: Hot adult contemporary

Ownership
- Owner: Telesouth Communications Inc
- Sister stations: WOXF

History
- First air date: 1997 (as WLPX)
- Former call signs: WYCG (1993–1996, CP); WLPX (1996–2000); WTNM (2000–2015)

Technical information
- Licensing authority: FCC
- Facility ID: 6200
- Class: A
- ERP: 4,700 watts
- HAAT: 113 meters (371 ft)
- Transmitter coordinates: 34°12′46″N 89°44′55″W

Links
- Public license information: Public file; LMS
- Webcast: Listen Live
- Website: theq105.com

WQLJ (105.5 FM, "Q105") is a radio station in Water Valley, Mississippi and is owned by Telesouth Communications Inc and airs a hot adult contemporary format.

== History ==
On May 28, 2015 the then-WTNM changed its format from talk (branded as "Super Talk Mississippi") to hot adult contemporary, branded as "Q105". On June 4, 2015, WTNM changed its call letters to WQLJ.
