= KILN-LP =

- Alturas, California; United States
- Broadcast area: Modoc County
- Frequency: 99.1 MHz

Programming
- Format: Community

Ownership
- Owner: The Modoc County Arts Council

History
- First air date: July 4, 2014
- Former call signs: KFNL-LP (2014, CP)

Technical information
- Licensing authority: FCC
- Facility ID: 193503
- Class: L1
- ERP: 100 watts
- HAAT: −30 meters (−98 ft)
- Transmitter coordinates: 41°28′58″N 128°32′28″W

Links
- Public license information: LMS
- Website: kilnlpfm.com

KILN-LP is a low power radio station broadcasting a community radio format from Alturas, California, United States, to Modoc County, California.

== History ==
In late 2013, the Modoc County Arts Council looked at creating a low power community radio station for the community of Alturas, as the FCC began to authorize new radio stations of either 10 or 100 watts for non-profit educational facilities, tribes, or public safety organizations. Making only an agreement to “test the water”, Arts Council president Dan Dockery (a long time ham radio operator) submitted the application. Meanwhile, Jim and Elizabeth Cavasso allowed the use the rooftop of the Niles Hotel for the antenna and a small upstairs room to house the equipment. In January 2014, KILN-LP was granted a construction permit. The station went on the air at 99.1 FM on July 4, 2014, broadcasting at 100 watts.

Terry Olson initiated a “Founding Member” fund drive and civic organizations welcomed presentations on a new Alturas community radio; funding becoming available through several sources, including the McConnell Foundation and the Shasta Regional Community Foundation. Today, KILN has thrived thanks to the huge music library of Glenn Lantz; the fifty years of recording, production and broadcasting experience of Bruce Brown; the interest and enthusiasm of Nick Menkee (aka Max Stout), and the electronics expertise of James Paisley.

In late 2019, the Modoc County Arts Council took over the running of KILN from the Art Center.
