= Universidad Autónoma del Estado de Morelos =

Public university in Morelos, Mexico

Autonomous University of the State of Morelos
- Universidad Autónoma del Estado de Morelos
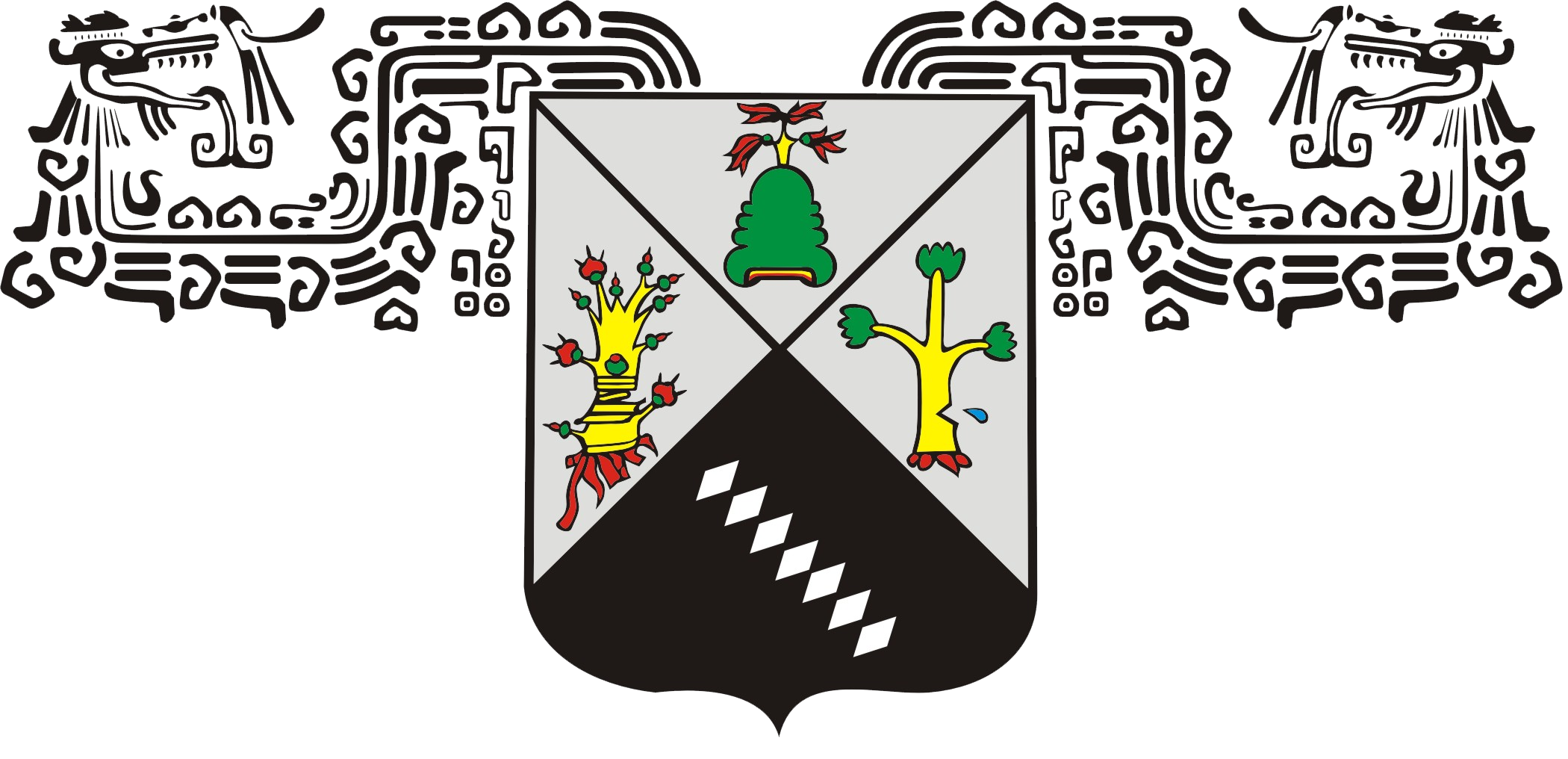
- Former names: Universidad de Morelos
- Motto: Por una humanidad culta
- Motto in English: For A Civilized Humanity
- Type: Public university
- Established: 1953
- Rector: Gustavo Urquiza Beltrán
- Students: 34,000
- Location: Cuernavaca, Morelos, Mexico; 18.982590°N 99.234570°W
- Colors: Blue and white
- Website: uaem.mx

The Universidad Autónoma del Estado de Morelos (Autonomous University of the State of Morelos, UAEM) is a public university in Cuernavaca, Morelos, Mexico. It is the largest institution of higher education in Morelos, with facilities statewide.

== History ==
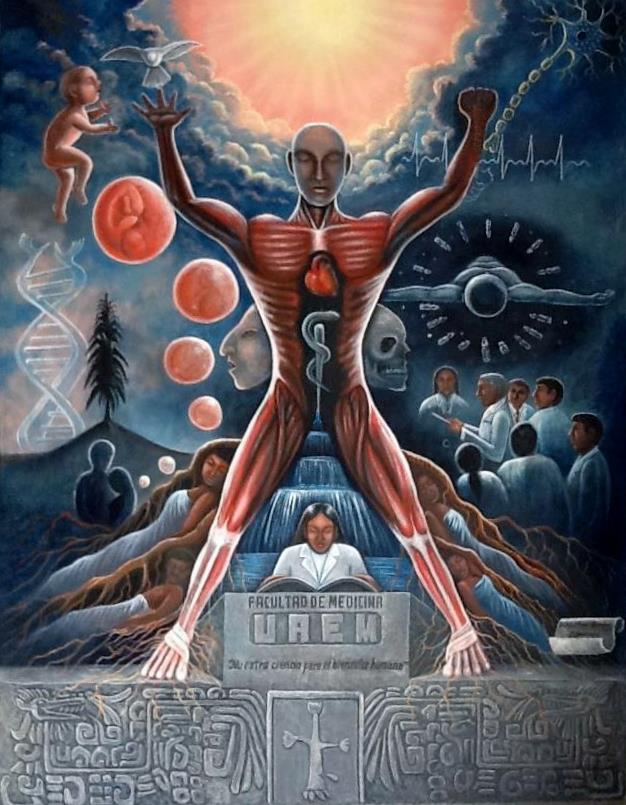
A mural at the UAEM College of Medicine

In 1938, the Instituto de Educación Superior (Higher Education Institute) was established, offering bachillerato-level courses. Between 1943 and 1945, it absorbed the College of Nursing and Obstetrics and the College of Commerce and Administration, allowing the IES to begin offering additional and higher-level programs.

In 1953, seeking to improve the quality of higher education in Morelos and in response to an increased demand, the governor and the Institute presented the 31st State Legislature with a proposal to transform the IES into a university. That year, the legislature passed a law creating and regulating the Universidad de Morelos (University of Morelos).

The new university did not have a campus, offering its programs in different facilities. In 1958, under interim rector Francisco Cabrera de la Rosa, the school began to seek the construction of its own campus. In the early 1960s, land was donated for the school in Chamilpa, which had originally been slated for development as a military college. On November 22, 1967, with the university now settled in its new campus to the north of Cuernavaca, it gained autonomy and changed its name to the Universidad Autónoma del Estado de Morelos.

In the 1980s, the university began to expand statewide. In 1985, the Eastern Regional Professional Institute (IPRO) opened, offering agricultural programs such as a degree in engineering for farm implements and vegetable production, and soon after, it began offering social sciences and business degrees in areas such as sociology, economics and accounting. Facing increasing demand in some of its core programs, the Southern Regional Professional Institute (IPRES) was founded in Jojutla, offering law, administration and accounting degrees.

Continued expansion of the UAEM resulted in the establishment of a radio service, Radio UAEM, in 2000, with transmitters in Cuernavaca, Cuautla, and Jojutla, as well as the conversion of the professional institutes into regional campuses.

== Campuses ==
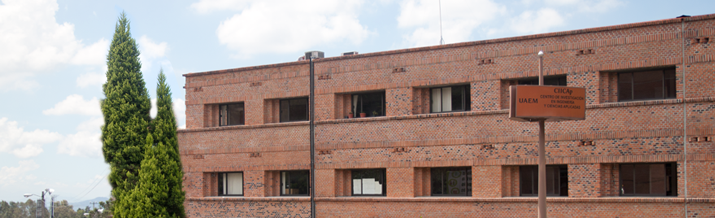
The Centro de Investigación en Ingeniería y Ciencias Aplicadas (Center for Research in Engineering and Applied Sciences) on the UAEM campus in Cuernavaca

The Universidad Autónoma del Estado de Morelos has a presence in 17 municipalities in the state.

Higher education facilities are located in Cuernavaca, Jojutla, Cuautla, Ayala/Xalostoc, Jonacatepec, Puente de Ixtla, and Mazatepec. There are six preparatory schools associated with the university and various regional centers.

== Notable people ==
- Gregory Berger, American documentarian and professor of film
- Sergio Álvarez Mata, Mexican politician affiliated with the National Action Party (PAN)
