= KLBP-LP =

Community radio station in Long Beach, California

- Long Beach, California; United States
- Frequency: 99.1 MHz
- Branding: "KLBP"

Programming
- Format: Community radio

Ownership
- Owner: Long Beach Community Television and Media Corporation

History
- Former call signs: KLBP-LP (2016–2017); KRNF-LP (2017)

Technical information
- Licensing authority: FCC
- Facility ID: 195312
- Class: L1
- ERP: 100 watts
- HAAT: 36 meters (118 ft)
- Transmitter coordinates: 33.7497°N 118.2125°W

Links
- Public license information: LMS
- Webcast: Listen Live
- Website: Official Website

KLBP-LP (99.1 FM) is a radio station licensed to serve the community of Long Beach, California. The station is owned by Long Beach Community Television and Media Corporation, and airs a community radio format.

The station was assigned the call sign KLBP-LP by the Federal Communications Commission on January 26, 2016. The station changed its call sign to KRNF-LP on April 3, 2017, and back to KLBP-LP on September 13, 2017
