= XHCM-FM =

Radio station in Cuernavaca, Morelos, Mexico

- Cuernavaca, Morelos; Mexico
- Frequency: 88.5 FM
- Branding: Buenisiima

Programming
- Format: Regional Mexican

Ownership
- Owner: Grupo Audiorama Comunicaciones; (Radio Electrónica Mexicana, S.A.)
- Sister stations: XHNG-FM, XHCU-FM

History
- First air date: January 19, 1968 (concession)
- Call sign meaning: Cuernavaca Morelos

Technical information
- Class: C1
- ERP: 10 kW
- HAAT: 588.5 m
- Transmitter coordinates: 19°03′35″N 99°12′59″W

Links
- Webcast: Listen live
- Website: audiorama.mx

XHCM-FM is a radio station on 88.5 FM in Cuernavaca, Morelos. It is owned by Grupo Audiorama Morelos and carries a Regional Mexican format known as Buenisiima.

== History ==
Logo with Ke Buena used until June 2017, when Audiorama stations shed Televisa Radio formats

XHCM received its concession on January 19, 1968. The station later became "La Mexicana", a brand used until the Radiorama–Audiorama split of 2013. At that time, the station took on the Ke Buena brand from Televisa Radio. In 2017, Audiorama's stations all dropped their Televisa Radio formats, resulting in the current "Buenisiima" brand.

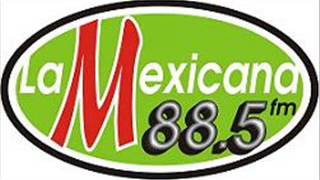
Logo as La Mexicana 88.5, used until 2013

On September 19, 2017, the 2017 Central Mexico earthquake caused the collapse of the whole Torre Latinoamericana in Cuernavaca, which was home to Grupo Audiorama's Cuernavaca studios and offices as well as the transmitter facilities of XHCM and XHNG.
