= Supertalk Mississippi =

Mississippi radio network

Coordinates: 32.3975°N 90.1435°W

Telesouth Communications Inc
- Industry: Radio
- Predecessor: Mississippi Agriculture and News Network
- Headquarters: 6311 Ridgewood Road, Jackson, Mississippi, US
- Area served: Mississippi
- Key people: Steve Davenport (CEO) (2022)
- Owner: Steve Davenport
- Number of employees: 140 (2015)
- Website: Official website

Telesouth Communications Inc, also known as SuperTalk Mississippi Media, is an American commercial radio network based in Jackson, Mississippi. Its stations across Mississippi broadcast either a music format, or news/talk and sports under the SuperTalk brand.

The network's talk stations carry a mix of syndicated national shows, its programming, and material produced at the individual stations. Sports schedules are matched to teams based in local markets.

== History ==
In 1979, Steve Davenport was hired to manage the Love Communications owned Mississippi Agriculture and News Network in Jackson, Mississippi. Shortly afterward, it was purchased by Baton Rouge-based Interstate Communications and merged with Louisiana Network Inc. Soon, production of news reports and short features for Mississippi radio stations evolved to include longer lifestyle, and sports phone-in programs.

The firm began broadcasting live football and basketball from the University of Southern Mississippi in 1984 and went on to take sports broadcast franchises for the University of Mississippi and University of Southern Mississippi. As well as programming for Mississippi and Louisiana, the South Carolina News Network was also produced from Jackson until 2008.

Following disagreement over a $25,000 annual franchise fee for the Ole Miss Rebels, Steve Davenport and his business partners the Hanley family of Hazlehurst agreed to purchase Interstate Communications' Mississippi market business, Mississippi Networks Inc, for $300,000 in 1985. Davenport bought out the Hanley's stake in 2008.

Amid financial turmoil in 1988, Telesouth sold its newly acquired Biloxi radio station, then bought others, eventually covering all 82 counties of Mississippi.

In 1995, the business name was changed to Telesouth Communications Inc, and in 1997 current flagship WFMN (Flora) and WTCD (Indianola) stations were purchased and converted to pioneer a "SuperTalk" conservative talk show format.

Jackson State Tigers football was added to the sport broadcast roster in 1998, and the Southern Urban News Network established to produce news features for radio stations in urban markets across Mississippi. The Urban News Network was merged with the firm's Mississippi News Network in 2011.

Previous logo

Telesouth began to divest college sports broadcast franchises from 2011, and to purchase music radio stations. The franchise agreement with Ole Miss had been renewed in 2007 guaranteeing a minimum fee of $27 million over ten years and substantial investment by the broadcaster in facilities at Vaught–Hemingway Stadium, including a $6 million jumbotron. The agreement was taken over by Learfield in 2012. The franchise fee, payable by Telesouth to the University of Mississippi, for its final year of Ole Miss Rebels football was $3 million.

Purchases included Biloxi music stations from Alpha Media in 2018.

Between 2013 and 2018, sport, and then feel-good and lifestyle programming, were added to the SuperTalk format broadcast on Telesouth's 12 talk radio stations.

In 2019, the company began video broadcast of SuperTalk programming on C Spire cable.

== Radio stations ==
		License city	Format	Class	ERP watts
WFMM	97.3 FM	Sumrall (Note: For Hattiesburg)	Supertalk	A	6,000
WFMN	97.3 FM	Flora (Note: For Jackson)	Supertalk	C3	19,500
WFTA	101.9 FM	Fulton (Note: For Tupelo)	Supertalk	C2	50,000
WKBB	100.9 FM	Mantee	Supertalk	C2	47,000
WLAU	99.3 FM	Heidelberg (Note: For Laurel)	Supertalk	C2	50,000
WOSM	103.1 FM	Ocean Springs	Supertalk	C2	50,000
WTNM	93.7 FM	Courtland	Supertalk	C3	11,000
WRQO	102.1 FM	Monticello (Note: For Brookhaven)	Supertalk	C2	50,000
WTCD	96.9 FM	Indianola	Supertalk	C2	16,500
WXRZ	94.3 FM	Corinth	Supertalk	C3	25,000
WZKR	103.3 FM	Collinsville (Note: For Meridian)	Supertalk	C3	6,000
WMPK	93.5 FM	Summit	Supertalk	A	6,000
WKCU	92.9 FM	Corinth	country	D	250
WKCU	1350 AM	Corinth	country	D	400
WCNA	95.9 FM	Potts Camp	adult hits	C3	14,000
WQLJ	105.5 FM	Water Valley	hot AC	A	4,700
WOXF	105.1 FM	Oxford	hot AC	A	1,600
WYMX	99.1 FM	Greenwood	classic hits	C0	96,000
WLZA	96.1 FM	Eupora	classic hits	C2	40,000
WBZL	103.3 FM	Greenwood	classic hip-hop	C3	25,000
WDXO	92.9 FM	Hazlehurst	classic hip-hop	A	2,700
WOEG	1220 AM	Hazlehurst	classic hip-hop	D	164
WCPR	97.9 FM	D'Iberville	active rock	C2	50,000
WXYK	105.9 FM	Pascagoula	top 40	C3	25,000
WGBL	96.7 FM	Gulfport	classic hip-hop	A	4,300
W292GD	106.3 FM	Biloxi	adult hits	D	250
WANG	1490 AM	Biloxi	adult hits	C	1,000

== Talk shows ==
As of October 2026, SuperTalk's schedule includes:-

=== Network ===
- Mornings with Richard Cross
- MidDays with Gerard Gibert - Producer, Ryne "Ryno" Montgomery
- Good Things with Rebecca Turner - Producer, Ryne "Ryno" Montgomery
- SportsTalk Mississippi - Presenters, Richard Cross, Michael Borkey and Brian Hadad
- In a Mississippi Minute with Steve Azar
- Outdoors with Ricky Mathews
- The Ricky Mathews Show
- Garden Mama
- The Handyman Radio Show
- Richard Schwartz Legal Power Hour

=== National ===
- The Bongino Report AM
- The Lars Larson Show
- The Erick Erickson Show
- America At Night
- Coast to Coast AM
- The Guy Benson Show
- Fox Across America with Jimmy Failla

=== The JT and Dave Show ===
JT Williamson and Dave Ingram began to co-host the JT & Dave Show on SuperTalk in 2002. Long-time producer and occasional on-air contributor was “Scary” Gary O’Cain. Their guests on the show were often prominent Mississippi politicians and the pair addressed controversial topics in the state from a conservative perspective. The daily, three-hour shows campaigned for charter schools and to repeal traffic camera legislation. Phone-in callers that disagreed with the presenters were characteristically dealt with in a robust manner. Ingram left the show in 2010 and the abrupt nature of his departure prompted speculation on internet forums.

The show was briefly renamed Air Bubba, then the JT Show, and in a departure from interviewing Mississippi's state politicians in 2016, it hosted British campaigner Nigel Farage. Williamson announced he had been diagnosed with Lymphoma in 2020 and died that year.

== News networks ==
As of 2022, SuperTalk's general, statewide news service is carried by 48 Mississippi affiliate radio stations. Thirty-six broadcast its Agrinews package covering commodity prices and farming topics.

== College athletes' image rights ==
Telesouth Communications Inc was one of the defendants in a putative class action lawsuit brought by Steven Clarke and nine other amateur college athletes. They alleged athletic conferences, broadcast networks and licensing agencies (including Telesouth) improperly colluded to exclude them from the market for their image rights, and set those fees they received at zero or lower than what they would otherwise have achieved.

Judge Kevin H Sharp's 2015 decision in the United States District Court for the Middle District of Tennessee accepted that college sports was "big business", but concluded the way athletes had been required to surrender their images rights was lawful.
