= WYKC =

K-Love radio station in Whitefield, New Hampshire

- Whitefield, New Hampshire; United States
- Broadcast area: Northeast Kingdom and Northern New Hampshire
- Frequency: 99.1 MHz

Programming
- Format: Contemporary Christian music
- Network: K-Love

Ownership
- Owner: Educational Media Foundation

History
- First air date: July 2007; 18 years ago
- Former call signs: WXRG (2007–2008); WNYN-FM (2008–2021)

Technical information
- Licensing authority: FCC
- Facility ID: 165997
- Class: A
- ERP: 460 watts
- HAAT: 346 meters (1,135 ft)
- Transmitter coordinates: 44°21′10″N 71°44′15″W

Links
- Public license information: Public file; LMS
- Website: klove.com

WYKC (99.1 FM) is a K-Love radio station owned by the Educational Media Foundation, licensed to Whitefield, New Hampshire. The station serves the Northeast Kingdom and northern New Hampshire.

== History ==
White Park Broadcasting, part of the group of companies controlled by Steve Silberberg, won the right to build a radio station on 99.1 in Whitefield at auction in early 2006. It would sign on in July 2007 as WXRG, "Free 99.1", with an adult hits format. In 2008, the station became WNYN-FM, swapping call signs with a sister station in Massachusetts.

The "Free 99.1" variety hits format would remain until EMF acquired the station from Silberberg's Devon Broadcasting Corporation in 2020, as part of its $395,000 sale of three New Hampshire FMs to the Christian broadcaster. The call letters changed to WYKC on January 6, 2021, coincidental with the consummation of the sale.
