= WLAU =

Radio station in Heidelberg-Laurel, Mississippi

- Heidelberg, Mississippi; United States
- Broadcast area: Laurel-Hattiesburg
- Frequency: 99.3 MHz
- Branding: SuperTalk Mississippi 99.3

Programming
- Language: English
- Format: Talk radio
- Affiliations: Supertalk Mississippi

Ownership
- Owner: TeleSouth Communications, Inc.
- Sister stations: WFMM

History
- First air date: 1980
- Former call signs: WEEZ (1979–1999); WHER (1999–2012)
- Call sign meaning: Laurel

Technical information
- Licensing authority: FCC
- Facility ID: 52618
- Class: C2
- ERP: 50,000 watts
- HAAT: 150 meters (490 ft)
- Transmitter coordinates: 31°49′16.60″N 89°18′37.20″W

Links
- Public license information: Public file; LMS
- Website: Supertalk Laurel 99.3

WLAU (99.3 FM, "SuperTalk Mississippi 99.3") is a commercial radio station licensed to the community of Heidelberg, Mississippi, United States, serving the Laurel-Hattiesburg area. The station is licensed to and owned by TeleSouth Communications, Inc.

Licensed as WEEZ in 1979, the station's call sign was changed to WHER by the Federal Communications Commission (FCC) on June 8, 1999. The station's call sign was changed again to WLAU by the FCC on June 26, 2012.

Eagle 99 branding

As of June 18, 2012, WLAU broadcasts a news/talk format to the greater Laurel-Hattiesburg area as part of the SuperTalk Mississippi Network. While the station was owned by Clear Channel Communications, it aired a classic country music format branded as "Eagle 99".
