= XHNG-FM =

Radio station in Cuernavaca, Morelos, Mexico

Cuernavaca, Morelos; Mexico
- Frequency: 98.1 MHz
- Branding: Súper

Programming
- Format: Pop

Ownership
- Owner: Grupo Audiorama Comunicaciones; (Radio Nova, S.A. de C.V.)
- Sister stations: XHCM-FM, XHCU-FM

History
- First air date: 1975
- Call sign meaning: "Cuernavaca, Morelos"

Technical information
- ERP: 15 kW

Links
- Webcast: Listen live
- Website: audiorama.mx

XHNG-FM is a radio station on 98.1 FM in Cuernavaca, Morelos, Mexico. It is owned by Grupo Audiorama Morelos and is known as Súper 98.1 with a pop format.

== History ==
XHNG was awarded in December 1971 to Romeo Herrera Caballos and received its formal concession on March 12, 1976, having signed on in the summer of 1975. The station was known as Nova FM and later Estéreo Nova, airing a pop format. In order to ensure that his children studied and did not use the radio station as a toy, Herrera sold XHNG in 1981 to Julio Velarde, who at the time was the general manager for Radio Fórmula in Mexico City.

In the 1990s, the station took on the name "Super Nova" and became part of Radiorama; in 2004, it adopted the Los 40 Principales brand. The pop format and Los 40 moved in 2011 to XHTB-FM 93.3, and in exchange, the Éxtasis Digital English-language classic hits format from XHTB moved to 98.1. Éxtasis Digital later moved to XHASM-FM 107.7 when the Radiorama and Audiorama clusters in Cuernavaca split.

On September 19, 2017, the 2017 Central Mexico earthquake caused the collapse of the Torre Latinoamericana in Cuernavaca, which was home to Grupo Audiorama's Cuernavaca studios and offices as well as the transmitter facilities of XHCM and XHNG.
