= WOSM (FM) =

- Ocean Springs, Mississippi; United States
- Broadcast area: Gulfport-Biloxi metropolitan area
- Frequency: 103.1 MHz
- Branding: Supertalk Mississippi

Programming
- Language: English
- Format: Talk radio
- Network: Fox News Radio
- Affiliations: Premiere Networks; Westwood One

Ownership
- Owner: Stephen Davenport; (Telesouth Communications, Inc.)
- Sister stations: WXYK, WGBL, WCPR-FM, WANG

History
- First air date: 1971

Technical information
- Licensing authority: FCC
- Facility ID: 10477
- Class: C2
- ERP: 50,000 watts
- HAAT: 150 meters (492 feet)
- Transmitter coordinates: 30°24′34.70″N 88°42′23.10″W
- Repeater: 1490 WANG (Biloxi)

Links
- Public license information: Public file; LMS
- Website: www.supertalk.fm

WOSM (103.1 MHz) is a commercial FM radio station broadcasting a talk radio format. Licensed to Ocean Springs, Mississippi. It serves the Biloxi-Gulfport-Pascagoula radio market. It is owned by Stephen Davenport, through licensee Telesouth Communications, Inc.

WOSM is a Class C2 FM station. It has an effective radiated power (ERP) of 50,000 watts. The transmitter is on Radio Road in Ocean Springs.

== Programming ==
WOSM is part of the Supertalk Mississippi Network, with stations around the state. The main studios are on Ridgewood Road in Jackson. On weekdays, statewide talk shows are heard for much of the day, with a sports talk show in afternoon drive time. At night, the network carries nationally syndicated talk programs, including The Lars Larson Show, The Erick Erickson Show, America at Night, Coast to Coast AM with George Noory and The Bongino Report AM.

Weekends feature specialty shows on money, health, gardening, home improvement, travel, cars, guns and the outdoors. Weekend hosts include Rudy Maxa, Art Bell and repeats of weekday shows. Most hours begin with an update from Fox News Radio and the Supertalk Mississippi newsroom.
