= XHSW-FM =

Radio station in Cuernavaca, Morelos

- Cuernavaca, Morelos; Mexico
- Frequency: 94.9 FM
- Branding: La Más Picuda

Programming
- Format: Regional Mexican

Ownership
- Owner: Grupo Radiorama; (XHSW-FM, S.A. de C.V.)

History
- First air date: June 15, 1981 (concession)

Technical information
- ERP: 10 kW

Links
- Website: www.radioramamorelos.com.mx/LaMasPicuda/

XHSW-FM is a radio station on 94.9 FM in Cuernavaca, Morelos. It is owned by Grupo Radiorama and known as La Más Picuda with a Regional Mexican format.

== History ==
XHSW received its concession on June 15, 1981. It was owned by Elvira Paz Cisneros until 2002.
