= WYMX =

Radio station in Greenwood, Mississippi

- Greenwood, Mississippi; United States
- Broadcast area: Mississippi Delta
- Frequency: 99.1 MHz
- Branding: Max 99.1

Programming
- Format: Classic hits

Ownership
- Owner: Telesouth Communications
- Sister stations: WBZL; WTCD

History
- First air date: June 15, 1965 (as WSWG-FM)
- Former call signs: WSWG-FM (1965–1988)

Technical information
- Facility ID: 65007
- Class: C0
- ERP: 100,000 watts
- HAAT: 300 meters (980 ft)
- Transmitter coordinates: 33°34′34″N 90°22′33″W

Links
- Webcast: Listen live
- Website: max99radio.com

WYMX (99.1 FM, "Max 99") is a classic hits formatted radio station licensed to Greenwood, Mississippi, United States. The station is currently owned by Telesouth Communications.

== Programming ==
Programming includes Charlie in the Morning, and football from Ole Miss and Pillow Academy.

== History ==
For many years the station was branded Max 99.1, but became "Bob FM" on July 31, 2006. Later it reverted to a hot AC format as "Max 99".
