= WXYK (FM) =

Coordinates: 30.405°N 88.791°W

- Pascagoula, Mississippi; United States
- Broadcast area: Biloxi - Gulfport - Pascagoula
- Frequency: 105.9 MHz
- Branding: 105.9 The Monkey

Programming
- Language: English
- Format: Top 40 (CHR)
- Affiliations: Premiere Networks; United Stations Radio Networks

Ownership
- Owner: Stephen Davenport; (Telesouth Communications, Inc.)
- Sister stations: WANG, WCPR-FM, WGBL, WOSM

History
- First air date: 1976 (as WGUD)
- Former call signs: WGUD (1976–1985); WGUD-FM (1985–1994); WXYK (1994–1997); WXRG (1997–2006); WHGO (2006–2010); WQBB (2010–2019)

Technical information
- Licensing authority: FCC
- Facility ID: 72132
- Class: C3
- ERP: 25,000 watts
- HAAT: 95 meters (312 feet)

Links
- Public license information: Public file; LMS
- Webcast: Listen live
- Website: 1059themonkey.com

WXYK (105.9 MHz, "105.9 The Monkey") is a commercial FM radio station licensed to Pascagoula, Mississippi and serving the Biloxi - Gulfport - Pascagoula radio market. The station has a top 40 (CHR) radio format and is owned by Telesouth Communications Inc. The studios and offices are on Three Rivers Road in Gulfport. WXYK carries The Kidd Kraddick Morning Show from United Stations Radio Networks and American Top 40 with Ryan Seacrest, syndicated from Premiere Networks.

WXYK has an effective radiated power (ERP) of 25,000 watts from its transmitter off Pine Hills Road in Ocean Springs.

== History ==
=== WGUD/Kiss-FM/WXRG ===
The station started as a country music outlet, using the call sign WGUD, then WGUD-FM. It flipped to a Top 40 hits outlet as WXYK, "105.9 KISS FM", until 1997 when 105.9 FM, 96.7 FM and 107.1 FM switched frequencies. KISS FM went to the 107.1 FM frequency, with classic rock moving from the 96.7 FM frequency to the 105.9 FM frequency as WXRG.

=== Go-FM/Classic Rock 105.9/Bob 105-9 ===
On September 21, 2006, after a day of stunting with a loop of Fleetwood Mac's Go Your Own Way, WXRG dropped classic rock for classic hits as 105.9 GO-FM and adopting the WHGO call letters. In 2009, the station gradually leaned back to a true classic rock format and rebranded as Classic Rock 105.9.

On October 4, 2010, WHGO began stunting with a Microsoft Sam voice reciting a countdown of the days, hours, minutes, and seconds while interspersing a random movie quote or song lyric a few times each minute. On October 8, at 3 p.m., WHGO flipped to adult hits, branded as Bob 105.9 with a new call sign of WQBB. The station was programmed by local radio veteran "Weerd Wayne" Watkins.

In July 2014, station owner Triad Broadcasting was sold to Alpha Media, along with sister stations WCPR, WGBL, WXYK and WTNI.

=== 105.9 The Monkey ===
In December 2018, Alpha Media announced it would be selling its Gulf Coast cluster to local Mississippi broadcast company Telesouth Communications Inc., which already owned WOSM, a talk radio station in the Biloxi market. The FCC approved the sale on February 12, 2019, and closed on March 1, 2019.

On March 1, at midnight, after playing Stairway To Heaven by Led Zeppelin, WQBB dropped the adult hits format and assumed the programming of "107-1 The Monkey", which had it own frequency sold off to KLOVE owner Educational Media Foundation as part of the sales transaction to Telesouth and required by the FCC. The first song on "105.9 The Monkey" was 7 Rings by Ariana Grande. This move returned the CHR format and WXYK call letters to the frequency after a 22-year absence.
