= XHTB-FM =

Radio station in Cuernavaca, Morelos, Mexico

- Cuernavaca, Morelos; Mexico
- Frequency: 93.3 MHz
- Branding: Play FM

Programming
- Format: Pop

Ownership
- Owner: Grupo Radiorama; (Estereopolis, S.A. de C.V.)

History
- First air date: February 8, 1973 (concession)
- Former frequencies: 105.9 MHz (1973–1990s)
- Call sign meaning: Carlos Tenorio Benítez (original concessionaire)

Technical information
- Class: C1
- ERP: 15 kW
- HAAT: 588.7 m
- Transmitter coordinates: 19°03′35″N 99°12′59″W

Links
- Webcast: Listen live
- Website: arroba.fm radioramamorelos.com.mx

XHTB-FM is a radio station on 93.3 FM in Cuernavaca, Morelos, Mexico. It is owned by Grupo Radiorama and carries a pop format known as Play FM.

== History ==
XHTB received its concession on February 8, 1973. It was owned by Carlos Tenorio Benítez and broadcast on 105.9 MHz with 1.873 kW ERP. By the 1990s, XHTB had moved to 93.3 and was broadcasting with 23 kW. In 1998, power was decreased to 10 kW. The known format used in the early 2000s was Extasis Digital until they swapped formats with XHNG-FM in 2011. In 2017, XHTB converted from the Los 40 format to the similar @FM format, which is owned by Radiorama.
