= List of radio stations in Mississippi =

The following is a list of FCC-licensed radio stations in the U.S. state of Mississippi, which can be sorted by their call signs, frequencies, cities of license, licensees, and programming formats.

== List of radio stations ==
Call sign	Frequency	City of license	Licensee	Format
KJMS	101.1 FM	Olive Branch	iHM Licenses, LLC	Urban adult contemporary
KUMB	89.7 FM	Hollywood	Casa de Destino, Inc.	Modern AC/Classic rock
WABG	960 AM	Greenwood	SPB LLC	Classic rock, Delta blues
WABO	990 AM	Waynesboro	Heathcock Communications, LLC	Adult hits
WABO-FM	105.5 FM	Waynesboro	Heathcock Communications, LLC	Adult hits
WACR-FM	105.3 FM	Columbus AFB	GTR Licenses, LLC	Urban adult contemporary
WADI	95.3 FM	Corinth	Eagle Radio Network, Inc.	Country
WAFM	95.7 FM	Amory	Stanford Communications, Inc.	Oldies
WAFR	88.3 FM	Tupelo	American Family Association	Inspirational (AFR)
WAGR-FM	102.5 FM	Lexington	Holmes County Broadcasting Company, LLC	Urban oldies
WAID	106.5 FM	Clarksdale	Radio Cleveland, Inc.	Urban contemporary
WAIH	96.5 FM	Holly Springs	Educational Media Foundation	Contemporary Christian (K-Love)
WAII	89.3 FM	Hattiesburg	American Family Association	Religious talk (AFR)
WAIP-LP	103.9 FM	Gulfport	Islamic Center of Gulfport, Inc.	Ethnic
WAJS	91.7 FM	Tupelo	American Family Association	Inspirational (AFR)
WAJV	98.9 FM	Brooksville	GTR Licenses, LLC	Gospel
WAKH	105.7 FM	McComb	North Shore Broadcasting Co., Inc.	Country
WALT-FM	102.1 FM	Meridian	Meridian Media Group, LLC	Talk
WAML	1340 AM	Collins	Tillman Broadcasting Network, Inc.	Gospel
WAMY	1580 AM	Amory	Stanford Communications, Inc.	Classic country
WANG	1490 AM	Biloxi	Telesouth Communications, Inc.	Talk
WAON-LP	100.5 FM	Picayune	Heritage Baptist Ministries, Inc.	Religious teaching
WAOY	91.7 FM	Gulfport	American Family Association	Inspirational (AFR)
WAPF	1140 AM	McComb	North Shore Broadcasting Co., Inc.	Sports
WAQB	90.9 FM	Tupelo	American Family Association	Religious talk (AFR)
WAQL	90.5 FM	McComb	American Family Association	Inspirational (AFR)
WASM	91.1 FM	Natchez	American Family Association	Inspirational (AFR)
WATP	90.9 FM	Laurel	American Family Association	Religious talk (AFR)
WATU	89.3 FM	Port Gibson	American Family Association	Inspirational (AFR)
WAUJ-LP	103.1 FM	Laurel	Original Worship Ministry	Religious teaching
WAUM	91.9 FM	Duck Hill	American Family Association	Religious talk (AFR)
WAVI	91.5 FM	Oxford	American Family Association	Inspirational (AFR)
WAZA	107.7 FM	Liberty	North Shore Broadcasting Co., Inc.	Urban contemporary
WBAD	94.3 FM	Leland	TBTS Broadcasting, LLC	Urban
WBBL	96.5 FM	Richton	Blakeney Communications, Inc	Gospel
WBBN	95.9 FM	Taylorsville	Blakeney Communications, Inc	Country
WBBV	101.3 FM	Vicksburg	Holladay Broadcasting of Louisiana, L.L.C.	Country
WBIP	1400 AM	Booneville	Community Broadcasting Services of Mississippi, Inc.	Country
WBKM	96.7 FM	Columbia	Educational Media Foundation	Contemporary Christian (K-Love)
WBKN	92.1 FM	Brookhaven	North Shore Broadcasting Co., Inc.	Country
WBLE	100.5 FM	Batesville	J. Boyd Ingram and Carol B. Ingram	Country
WBUV	104.9 FM	Moss Point	iHM Licenses, LLC	Talk
WBYB	98.3 FM	Cleveland	John H. and Lynn C. Allen	Oldies
WBYP	107.1 FM	Belzoni	Zoo-Bel Broadcasting, LLC	Country
WBZK	94.7 FM	Taylor	Oxford Media Group, LLC	Alternative
WBZL	103.3 FM	Greenwood	Telesouth Communications, Inc.	Classic country
WCHJ	1470 AM	Brookhaven	Tillman Broadcasting Network, Inc.	
WCJU	1450 AM	Columbia	WCJU, Incorporated	Talk/Classic hits
WCKK	96.7 FM	Walnut Grove	Johnny Boswell Radio LLC	Country
WCLD	1490 AM	Cleveland	Radio Cleveland, Inc.	Gospel
WCLD-FM	103.9 FM	Cleveland	Radio Cleveland, Inc.	Urban contemporary
WCNA	95.9 FM	Potts Camp	Telesouth Communications, Inc.	Adult contemporary
WCPC	940 AM	Houston	Cajun Radio Corporation	Christian
WCPR-FM	97.9 FM	Wiggins	Telesouth Communications, Inc.	Active rock
WCQC	91.3 FM	Clarksdale	Quitman County Development Org dab Deep South Delta Foundation	Community radio
WCSO	90.5 FM	Columbus	American Family Association	Religious talk (AFR)
WDAA	101.5 FM	Bruce	SSR Communications, Inc.	Christian
WDMS	100.7 FM	Greenville	High Plains Radio Network, LLC	Country
WDRO-LP	101.3 FM	Monticello	Lawrence County Public Radio, Inc.	Variety
WDSV	91.9 FM	Greenville	Delta Foundation, Inc.	Community radio
WDSW-LP	88.1 FM	Cleveland	Delta State University	Adult album alternative, roots, blues
WDTL	105.7 FM	Indianola	Delta Radio Network, LLC	Country
WDXO	92.9 FM	Hazlehurst	Telesouth Communications, Inc.	Classic hip hop
WEBL	95.3 FM	Coldwater	North Mississippi Media Group, LLC.	Country
WEHS-LP	101.7 FM	Eupora	Voice of Eupora	Religious teaching
WELO	580 AM	Tupelo	JMD, Inc.	Classic soul
WELZ	1460 AM	Belzoni	Zoo-Bel Broadcasting, LLC	Blues
WENQ	92.3 FM	Grenada	Rayanna Group LLC	Classic hits
WESE	92.5 FM	Baldwyn	iHM Licenses, LLC	Urban contemporary
WESY	1580 AM	Leland	TBTS Broadcasting, LLC	
WEXR	106.9 FM	Stonewall	Meridian Community College Foundation	College radio
WFCA	107.9 FM	Ackerman	French Camp Radio, Inc.	Southern gospel
WFCG	107.3 FM	Tylertown	North Shore Broadcasting Co., Inc.	Southern gospel
WFMM	97.3 FM	Sumrall	Telesouth Communications, Inc	News/talk (Supertalk Mississippi)
WFMN	97.3 FM	Flora	WFMN Radio, Inc.	News/talk (Supertalk Mississippi)
WFNH-LP	95.1 FM	Jackson	Focus on Natural Health Education & Community Development	Christian
WFOI-LP	100.5 FM	Fayette	Muhammad's University of the New Islam	R&B Oldies
WFOR	1400 AM	Hattiesburg	Eagle Broadcasting, LLC	Sports (FSR)
WFQY	970 AM	Brandon	Jackson Radio, LLC	Classic hip-hop
WFTA	101.9 FM	Fulton	Telesouth Communications, Inc.	News/talk (Supertalk Mississippi)
WGBL	96.7 FM	Gulfport	Telesouth Communications, Inc.	Classic hip hop
WGCM	1240 AM	Gulfport	JLE, Incorporated	Rhythmic throwbacks
WGCM-FM	102.3 FM	Gulfport	JLE, Incorporated	Classic hits
WGDQ	93.1 FM	Hattiesburg	Vernon Floyd dba Circuit Broadcasting of Hattiesburg	Gospel
WGNG	106.3 FM	Tchula	Team Broadcasting Company, Inc.	Urban contemporary
WGNL	104.3 FM	Greenwood	Team Broadcasting Company, Inc.	Urban oldies
WGTC-LP	92.7 FM	Mayhew	East Mississippi Community College	Top 40 (CHR)
WGVM	1260 AM	Greenville	High Plains Radio Network, LLC	Classic hits
WHAL-FM	95.7 FM	Horn Lake	iHM Licenses, LLC	Urban contemporary gospel
WHJA	890 AM	Laurel	Eternity Media Group LLC	Classic hip hop
WHJT	93.5 FM	Kearney Park	New South Radio, Inc.	Classic country
WHKL	106.9 FM	Crenshaw	J. Boyd Ingram and Carol B. Ingram	Classic country
WHLH	95.5 FM	Jackson	iHM Licenses, LLC	Gospel
WHOC	1490 AM	Philadelphia	WHOC, Inc.	Talk/sports
WHSY	950 AM	Hattiesburg	Sunbelt Broadcasting Corporation	News/talk
WIBT	97.9 FM	Greenville	Delta Radio Network, LLC	Urban contemporary
WIIN	780 AM	Ridgeland	New South Radio, Inc	Silent
WIQQ	102.1 FM	Leland	Delta Radio Network, LLC	Top 40 (CHR)
WIUK-LP	101.3 FM	Iuka	Flash Cats Animal Advocacy	Variety
WIVG	96.1 FM	Tunica	Flinn Broadcasting Corporation	Worship music (Air1)
WIWT-LP	100.1 FM	Jackson	Church in Jackson, Inc.	Religious teaching
WIXP-LP	106.7 FM	Greenville	Grace Outreach Bible Church, Inc.	Urban gospel
WIZK	1570 AM	Bay Springs	Sage Communications, LLC	Country
WJAI	93.9 FM	Pearl	Educational Media Foundation	Worship music (Air1)
WJBI	1290 AM	Batesville	J. Boyd Ingram and Carol B. Ingram	Urban oldies
WJDQ	101.3 FM	Meridian	Mississippi Broadcasters LLC	Top 40 (CHR)
WJDR	98.3 FM	Prentiss	Sun Belt Broadcasting Corporation	News/talk
WJDX	620 AM	Jackson	iHM Licenses, LLC	News/talk
WJDX-FM	105.1 FM	Kosciusko	iHM Licenses, LLC	Mainstream urban
WJKK	98.7 FM	Vicksburg	New South Radio, Inc.	Adult contemporary
WJKX	102.5 FM	Ellisville	iHM Licenses, LLC	Urban adult contemporary
WJLV	94.7 FM	Jackson	Educational Media Foundation	Contemporary Christian (K-Love)
WJMG	92.1 FM	Hattiesburg	Circuit Broadcasting Company of Hattiesburg	Urban contemporary
WJMI	99.7 FM	Jackson	Alpha Media Licensee LLC	Mainstream urban
WJNS-FM	92.1 FM	Bentonia	Family Worship Center Church, Inc.	Religious
WJNT	1180 AM	Pearl	Alpha Media Licensee LLC	Hot adult contemporary
WJQS	1400 AM	Jackson	Alpha Media Licensee LLC Debtor in Possession	Sports
WJSU-FM	88.5 FM	Jackson	Jackson State University	College radio
WJXC-LP	107.9 FM	Jackson	Mississippi Catholic Radio, Inc.	Catholic
WJXM	95.1 FM	Marion	Mississippi Broadcasters	Urban contemporary
WJXN-FM	100.9 FM	Utica	Flinn Broadcasting Corporation	Worship much
WJZB	88.7 FM	Starkville	American Family Association	Inspirational (AFR)
WJZD-FM	94.5 FM	Long Beach	WJZD, Inc.	Mainstream urban
WKBB	100.9 FM	Mantee	Telesouth Communications, Inc.	News/talk (Supertalk Mississippi)
WKCU	1350 AM	Corinth	Telesouth Communications, Inc.	Country
WKDJ-FM	96.5 FM	Clarksdale	Radio Cleveland, Inc.	Variety/modern AC
WKFF	102.1 FM	Sardis	Educational Media Foundation	Contemporary Christian (K-Love)
WKIU-LP	94.7 FM	Tupelo	Tupelo 2000, Inc.	Gospel/Jazz
WKJN	104.9 FM	Centreville	North Shore Broadcasting Co., Inc.	Gospel
WKMQ	1060 AM	Tupelo	iHM Licenses, LLC	News/talk
WKNN-FM	99.1 FM	Pascagoula	iHM Licenses, LLC	Country
WKOR-FM	94.9 FM	Columbus	Cumulus Licensing LLC	Country
WKOZ-FM	98.3 FM	Carthage	Johnny Boswell Radio LLC	Oldies
WKRA	1110 AM	Holly Springs	Billy R. Autry	Black gospel
WKRA-FM	92.7 FM	Holly Springs	Billy R. Autry	Black gospel
WKSO	97.3 FM	Natchez	Will Perk Broadcasting	Adult top 40
WKXG	92.7 FM	Moorhead	Contemporary Communications LLC	Country
WKXI-FM	107.5 FM	Magee	Alpha Media Licensee LLC	Urban adult contemporary
WKXY	92.1 FM	Merigold	Delta Radio LLC	Country
WKZB	97.9 FM	Newton	Meridian Media Group, LLC	Classic hits
WKZU	104.9 FM	Iuka	JC Media LLC	Classic country
WKZW	94.3 FM	Sandersville	Blakeney Communications, Inc.	Adult contemporary
WLAU	99.3 FM	Heidelberg	TeleSouth Communications, Inc.	News/talk (Supertalk Mississippi)
WLEE	1570 AM	Winona	Back Forty Broadcasting, LLC	Country
WLEE-FM	95.1 FM	Sherman	Southern Electronics Company, Inc.	Country
WLGF	107.1 FM	Gulfport	Educational Media Foundation	Contemporary Christian (K-Love)
WLIN-FM	101.1 FM	Durant	Boswell Media, LLC	Adult contemporary
WLRC	850 AM	Walnut	Martha S. & Christopher R. Clayton	Religious
WLRJ	104.7 FM	Greenville	Educational Media Foundation	Contemporary Christian (K-Love)
WLRK	91.5 FM	Greenville	Educational Media Foundation	Contemporary Christian (K-Love)
WLSM-FM	107.1 FM	Louisville	WH Properties, Inc.	Variety
WLVN	101.3 FM	Grenada	Educational Media Foundation	Contemporary Christian (K-Love)
WLVZ	103.7 FM	Collins	Educational Media Foundation	Contemporary Christian (K-Love)
WLXD	104.5 FM	State College	Educational Media Foundation	Contemporary Christian (K-Love)
WLXW	89.7 FM	Waynesboro	Educational Media Foundation	Contemporary Christian (K-Love)
WLYJ	98.9 FM	Quitman	Joy Christian Ministries	Christian
WLYY	90.7 FM	Louisville	Joy Christian Ministries Church	Southern gospel
WLZA	96.1 FM	Eupora	Telesouth Communications, Inc.	Classic hits
WMAB-FM	89.9 FM	Mississippi State	Mississippi Authority For Educational TV	Classical (MPB Classical HD Radio)
WMAE-FM	89.5 FM	Booneville	Mississippi Authority For Educational TV	Classical (MPB Classical HD Radio)
WMAH-FM	90.3 FM	Biloxi	Mississippi Authority For Educational TV	Classical (MPB Classical HD Radio)
WMAO-FM	90.9 FM	Greenwood	Mississippi Authority For Educational TV	Classical (MPB Classical HD Radio)
WMAU-FM	88.9 FM	Bude	Mississippi Authority For Educational TV	Classical (MPB Classical HD Radio)
WMAV-FM	90.3 FM	Oxford	Mississippi Authority For Educational TV	Classical (MPB Classical HD Radio)
WMAW-FM	88.1 FM	Meridian	Mississippi Authority For Educational TV	Classical (MPB Classical HD Radio)
WMBU	89.1 FM	Forest	The Moody Bible Institute of Chicago	Religious
WMEJ	1190 AM	Bay St. Louis	Hancock Broadcasting Corporation	Gospel
WMER	1390 AM	Meridian	N. Brad Carter, Jr.	Gospel
WMFH-LP	95.5 FM	Columbus	Classic Book Radio Corporation	Reading Service
WMGO	1370 AM	Canton	WMGO Broadcasting Corp., Inc.	Urban contemporary
WMIS	1240 AM	Natchez	New Vision Broadcasting, LLC	Urban gospel
WMJU	104.3 FM	Bude	North Shore Broadcasting Co., Inc.	Top 40 (CHR)
WMJW	107.5 FM	Rosedale	Radio Cleveland, Inc.	Country
WMJY	93.7 FM	Biloxi	iHM Licenses, LLC	Adult contemporary
WMOG	910 AM	Meridian	Mississippi Broadcasters	Urban gospel
WMPK	93.5 FM	Summit	Telesouth Communications, Inc.	News/talk (Supertalk Mississippi)
WMPN-FM	91.3 FM	Jackson	Mississippi Authority For Educational TV	Classical (MPB Classical HD Radio)
WMPR	90.1 FM	Jackson	J.C. Maxwell Broadcasting Group, Inc	Variety
WMSB	88.9 FM	Byhalia	American Family Association	Inspirational (AFR)
WMSI-FM	102.9 FM	Jackson	iHM Licenses, LLC	Country
WMSO	1240 AM	Southaven	Arlington Broadcasting Company	Urban adult contemporary
WMSU	92.1 FM	Starkville	GTR Licenses, LLC	Urban contemporary
WMSV	91.1 FM	Starkville	Mississippi State University	Alternative
WMUW	88.5 FM	Columbus	Mississippi University For Women	Variety
WMXI	98.1 FM	Ellisville	Eagle Broadcasting LLC	News/talk
WMXU	106.1 FM	Starkville	Cumulus Licensing LLC	Urban adult contemporary
WMYQ	93.1 FM	Shaw	Kizart Media Partners	
WNAT	1450 AM	Natchez	First Natchez Radio Group Inc	Rhythmic AC
WNAU	1470 AM	New Albany	Mpm Investment Group	Oldies
WNEV	98.7 FM	Friars Point	L.T. Simes II & Raymond Simes	Blues
WNIX	1330 AM	Greenville	Delta Radio Network, LLC	News/talk
WNLA	1390 AM	Indianola	Delta Radio Network, LLC	Gospel
WNLA-FM	95.3 FM	Drew	Fenty L. Fuss	Gospel
WNMQ	103.1 FM	Columbus	Cumulus Licensing LLC	Top 40 (CHR)
WNNN-LP	95.7 FM	Noxapater	Mt. Vernon Missionary Baptist Church	Religious teaching
WNSL	100.3 FM	Laurel	iHM Licenses, LLC	Top 40 (CHR)
WOAD	1300 AM	Jackson	Alpha Media Licensee LLC	Urban gospel
WOCJ	1440 AM	Pontotoc	Ollie Collins, Jr.	Christian
WOEG	1220 AM	Hazlehurst	Telesouth Communications, Inc.	Classic hip hop
WOKK	97.1 FM	Meridian	Mississippi Broadcasters, LLC	Country
WOLM	88.1 FM	D'Iberville	Radio Maria, Inc.	Christian
WONA-FM	95.1 FM	Winona	Southern Electronics Co., Inc.	Country
WORV	1580 AM	Hattiesburg	Circuit Broadcasting Co.	Religious
WOSM	103.1 FM	Ocean Springs	Telesouth Communications, Inc.	News/talk (Supertalk Mississippi)
WOWL	91.9 FM	Burnsville	Southern Community Services, Inc	Adult album alternative
WOXD	95.5 FM	Oxford	Taylor Communications, Inc.	Classic hits
WOXF	105.1 FM	Oxford	George S. Flinn, Jr.	Hot adult contemporary
WPAE	89.7 FM	Centreville	Port Allen Educational Broadcasting Foundation	Christian
WPAS	89.1 FM	Pascagoula	American Family Association	Religious talk (AFR)
WPBP-LP	104.5 FM	Brandon	City of Pearl	Variety
WPMO	1580 AM	Pascagoula-Moss Point	Tri City Radio, LLC	Sports (ISN)
WPRG	89.5 FM	Columbia	American Family Association	Religious talk (AFR)
WPRL	91.7 FM	Lorman	Alcorn State University	Public radio
WPWS-LP	104.3 FM	Piney Woods	The Piney Woods School	Variety
WQFX	1130 AM	Gulfport	Walking By Faith Ministries, Inc.	Gospel
WQID-LP	105.3 FM	Hattiesburg	Hattiesburg Urban Heritage Association	Urban gospel
WQLJ	105.5 FM	Water Valley	Telesouth Communications, Inc.	Hot adult contemporary
WQMS	1500 AM	Quitman	Matadors, LLC	Country
WQNZ	95.1 FM	Natchez	First Natchez Radio Group Inc	Country
WQRG-LP	96.3 FM	Diamondhead	Hancock County Amateur Radio Assoc., Inc.	Variety
WQRZ-LP	103.5 FM	Bay St. Louis	Hancock County Amateur Radio Assoc., Inc.	Variety – Storm Alert Station
WQST-FM	92.5 FM	Forest	American Family Association	Inspirational (AFR)
WQTP-LP	107.5 FM	Columbus	RTBT, LLC	Oldies
WQVI	90.5 FM	Forest	American Family Association	Religious talk (AFR)
WQXB	100.1 FM	Grenada	Rayanna Group LLC	Hot Country
WQYZ	92.5 FM	Ocean Springs	iHM Licenses, LLC	Classic rock
WRBE-FM	106.9 FM	Lucedale	JDL Corporation	Country/Southern gospel
WRBJ-FM	97.7 FM	Brandon	Roberts Radio Broadcasting, LLC	Urban contemporary
WRJW	1320 AM	Picayune	Pearl River Communications, Inc.	Talk
WRKN	106.1 FM	Picayune	Radio License Holding CBC, LLC	Gospel
WRKS	105.9 FM	Pickens	Alpha Media Licensee LLC Debtor in Possession	Sports (ESPN)
WROA	1390 AM	Gulfport	JLE, Incorporated	Classic country
WROX	1450 AM	Clarksdale	WROX, LLC	Classic hits/Classic rock/Blues
WRPM	1170 AM	Poplarville	JLE, Incorporated	
WRQO	102.1 FM	Monticello	Telesouth Communications, Inc.	News/talk (Supertalk Mississippi)
WRTM-FM	100.5 FM	Sharon	Commander Communications Corporation	Urban adult contemporary
WSEL-FM	96.7 FM	Pontotoc	Ollie Collins, Jr.	Christian
WSFZ	930 AM	Jackson	iHM Licenses, LLC	Black-oriented news
WSJC	810 AM	Magee	Family Talk Radio	Talk
WSKK	102.3 FM	Ripley	JC Media LLC	Classic hits
WSMP-LP	96.9 FM	Magee	Church Alive, Inc.	Contemporary Christian
WSMS	99.9 FM	Artesia	Cumulus Licensing LLC	Album-oriented rock
WSQH	91.7 FM	Decatur	American Family Association	Religious talk (AFR)
WSSM	104.9 FM	Prentiss	Sunbelt Broadcasting Corporation	Classic country
WSTZ-FM	106.7 FM	Vicksburg	iHM Licenses, LLC	Classic rock
WSYE	93.3 FM	Houston	JMD, Inc.	Adult contemporary
WTCD	96.9 FM	Indianola	Telesouth Communications, Inc.	News/talk (Supertalk Mississippi)
WTGY	95.7 FM	Charleston	Family Worship Center Church, Inc.	Religious
WTNM	93.7 FM	Courtland	Telesouth Communications, Inc.	News/talk (Supertalk Mississippi)
WTSY-LP	97.1 FM	Port Gibson	Team, Inc.	Variety
WTUP	1490 AM	Tupelo	iHM Licenses, LLC	Black-oriented news
WTUP-FM	99.3 FM	Guntown	iHM Licenses, LLC	Classic hits
WTWG	1050 AM	Columbus	CBN Communications, LLC	Gospel
WTWZ	1120 AM	Clinton	Wood Broadcasting Co.	Oldies
WTYJ	97.7 FM	Fayette	New Vision Broadcasting, LLC	Gospel
WTYL	1290 AM	Tylertown	Tylertown Broadcasting Company	Country
WTYL-FM	97.7 FM	Tylertown	Tylertown Broadcasting Co.	Country
WUCL	105.7 FM	De Kalb	Meridian Media Group, LLC	Classic country
WUMS	92.1 FM	University	Student Media Center of the U. of Ms	Jazz & blues
WURC	88.1 FM	Holly Springs	Rust College, Inc.	Public radio
WUSJ	96.3 FM	Madison	New South Radio, Inc.	Country
WUSM-FM	88.5 FM	Hattiesburg	University of Southern Mississippi	College radio
WVBG	1490 AM	Vicksburg	Owensville Communications, LLC	News/talk
WVBG-FM	105.5 FM	Redwood	Lendsi Radio, LLC	Classic hits
WVGG	1440 AM	Lucedale	JDL Corporation	Country/Southern gospel
WVMK-LP	100.3 FM	Vicksburg	Vicksburgs Voice for Education and Health	Variety
WVSD	91.7 FM	Itta Bena	Mississippi Valley State University	College radio
WWGI-LP	101.5 FM	Fayette	Fayette Community Service Organization Inc.	Variety
WWKZ	103.9 FM	Okolona	iHM Licenses, LLC	Top 40 (CHR)
WWMR	102.9 FM	Saltillo	Southern Broadcasting LLC	Country
WWMS	97.5 FM	Oxford	San Dow Broadcasting, Inc.	Country
WWQD	90.3 FM	Dekalb	Catholic Radio Network, Inc.	contemporary Christian (The Life FM)
WWSL	102.3 FM	Philadelphia	H & G C, Inc.	Hot adult contemporary
WWUN-FM	101.5 FM	Friars Point	CSN International	Religious (CSN International)
WWUU	101.1 FM	Washington	First Natchez Radio Group Inc.	Classic hits
WWZD-FM	106.7 FM	New Albany	iHM Licenses, LLC	Country
WWZQ	1240 AM	Aberdeen	Stanford Communications, Inc.	News/talk
WXRR	104.5 FM	Hattiesburg	Blakeney Communications, Inc.	Classic rock
WXRZ	94.3 FM	Corinth	Telesouth Communications, Inc.	News/talk (Supertalk Mississippi)
WXTN	1000 AM	Benton	Holmes County Broadcasting Company, LLC	Religious
WXWX	96.3 FM	Marietta	Southern Broadcasting LLC	Top 40 (CHR)
WXYK	105.9 FM	Pascagoula	TeleSouth Communications, Inc.	Top 40 (CHR)
WYAB	103.9 FM	Pocahontas	SSR Communications, Inc.	News/talk
WYAD-LP	94.1 FM	Yazoo City	Bountiful Blessings Broadcasting, Inc.	Urban gospel
WYAZ	89.5 FM	Yazoo City	American Family Association	Religious talk (AFR)
WYHL	1450 AM	Meridian	Mississippi Broadcasters, LLC	Sports (FSR)
WYMX	99.1 FM	Greenwood	Telesouth Communications, Inc.	Classic hits
WYOY	101.7 FM	Gluckstadt	New South Radio, Inc	Top 40 (CHR)
WYTF	88.7 FM	Indianola	American Family Association	Inspirational (AFR)
WZKR	103.3 FM	Collinsville	TeleSouth Communications, Inc.	News/talk (Supertalk Mississippi)
WZKS	104.1 FM	Union	Mississippi Broadcasters, L.L.C.	Urban contemporary
WZKX	107.9 FM	Bay St. Louis	JLE, Incorporated	Country
WZLD	106.3 FM	Petal	iHM Licenses, LLC	Mainstream urban
WZLQ	98.5 FM	Tupelo	JMD, Inc.	Mainstream rock
WZNF	95.3 FM	Lumberton	JLE, Incorporated	Top 40 (CHR)
WZQK	1240 AM	Flowood	Radio Jackson, LLC	Classic hits
WZYQ	101.7 FM	Mount Bayou	Fenty L Fuss	Top 40 (CHR)

== Defunct ==
- WAKK
- WCBI
- WCMR-FM
- WCSA
- WEPA
- WETX
- WFFF
- WGRM
- WGRM-FM
- WHLV
- WHSY (1230 AM)
- WIGG
- WILU-LP
- WJNS
- WKOR
- WKOZ
- WKXG
- WLGD
- WMLC
- WMOX
- WNBN
- WOKJ
- WONG
- WQBC
- WQMA
- WQST
- WSAO
- WSSO
- WSWG
- WTNI
- WZRX

== See also ==
- Mississippi media
  - List of newspapers in Mississippi
  - List of television stations in Mississippi
  - Media of locales in Mississippi: Biloxi, Gulfport, Hattiesburg, Jackson

== Bibliography ==
- Jack Alicoate, ed. (1939), "Mississippi", Radio Annual, New York: Radio Daily, OCLC 2459636 – via Internet Archive
- "AM Stations in the U.S.: Mississippi", Radio Annual Television Year Book, New York: Radio Television Daily, 1963, OCLC 10512375 – via Internet Archive

== Images ==
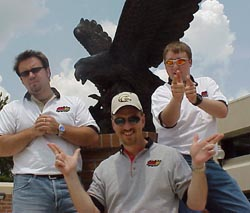
DJs of WXRR, Hattiesburg, 2002

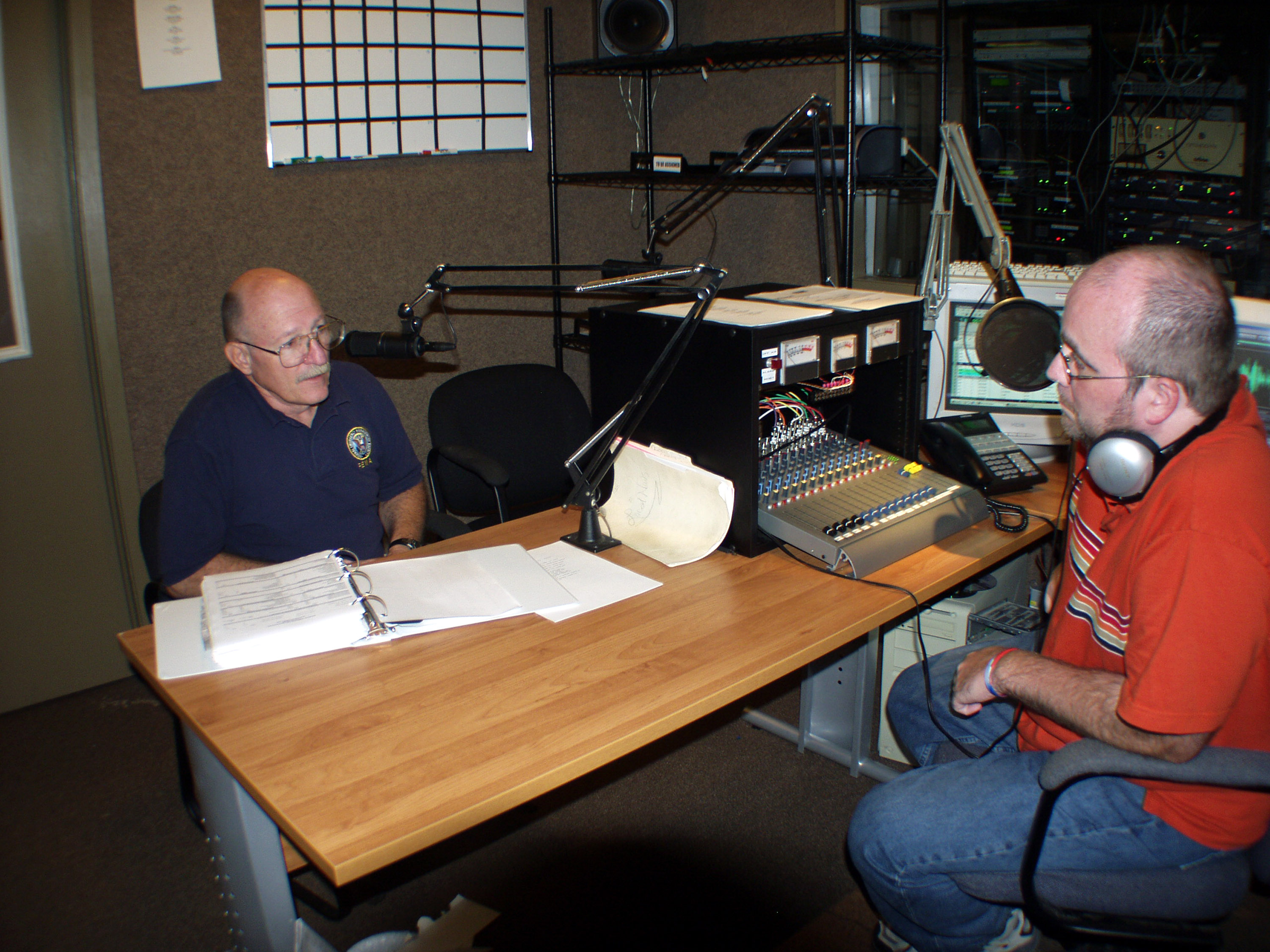
K-106 FM radio station, McComb, Miss., 2005

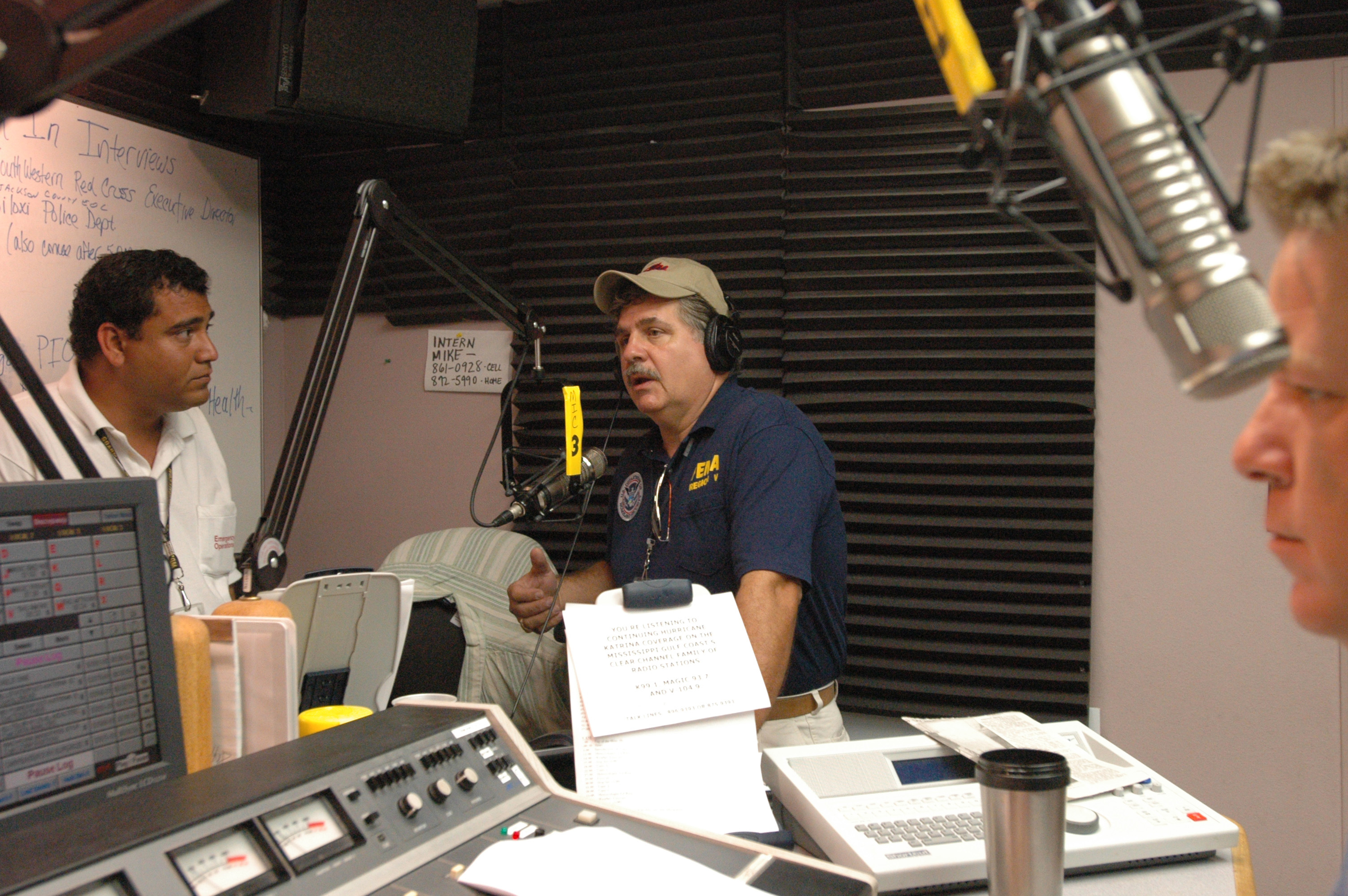
Radio studio, Biloxi, 2005

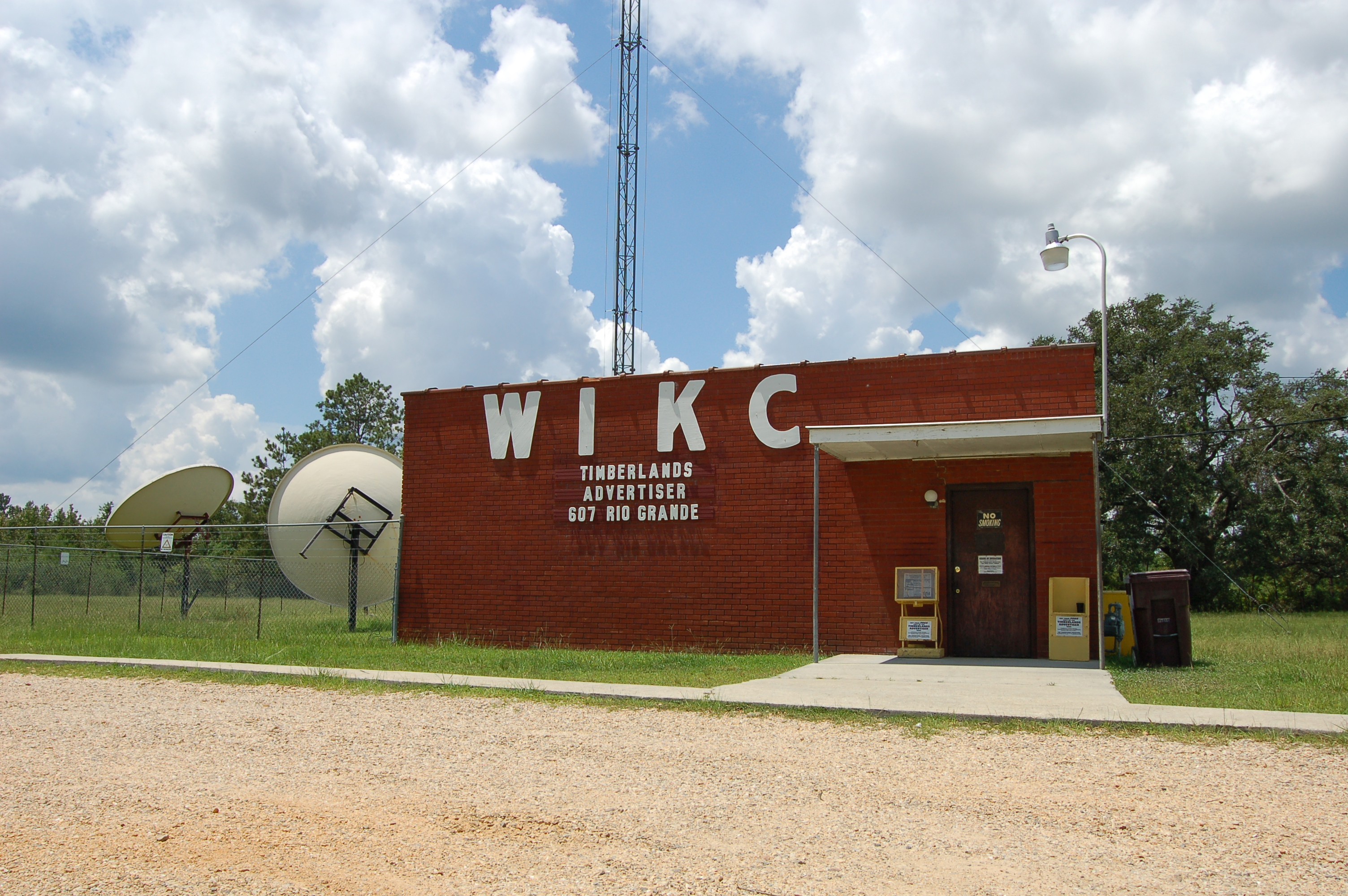
WIKC radio station, Picayune, Miss., 2006

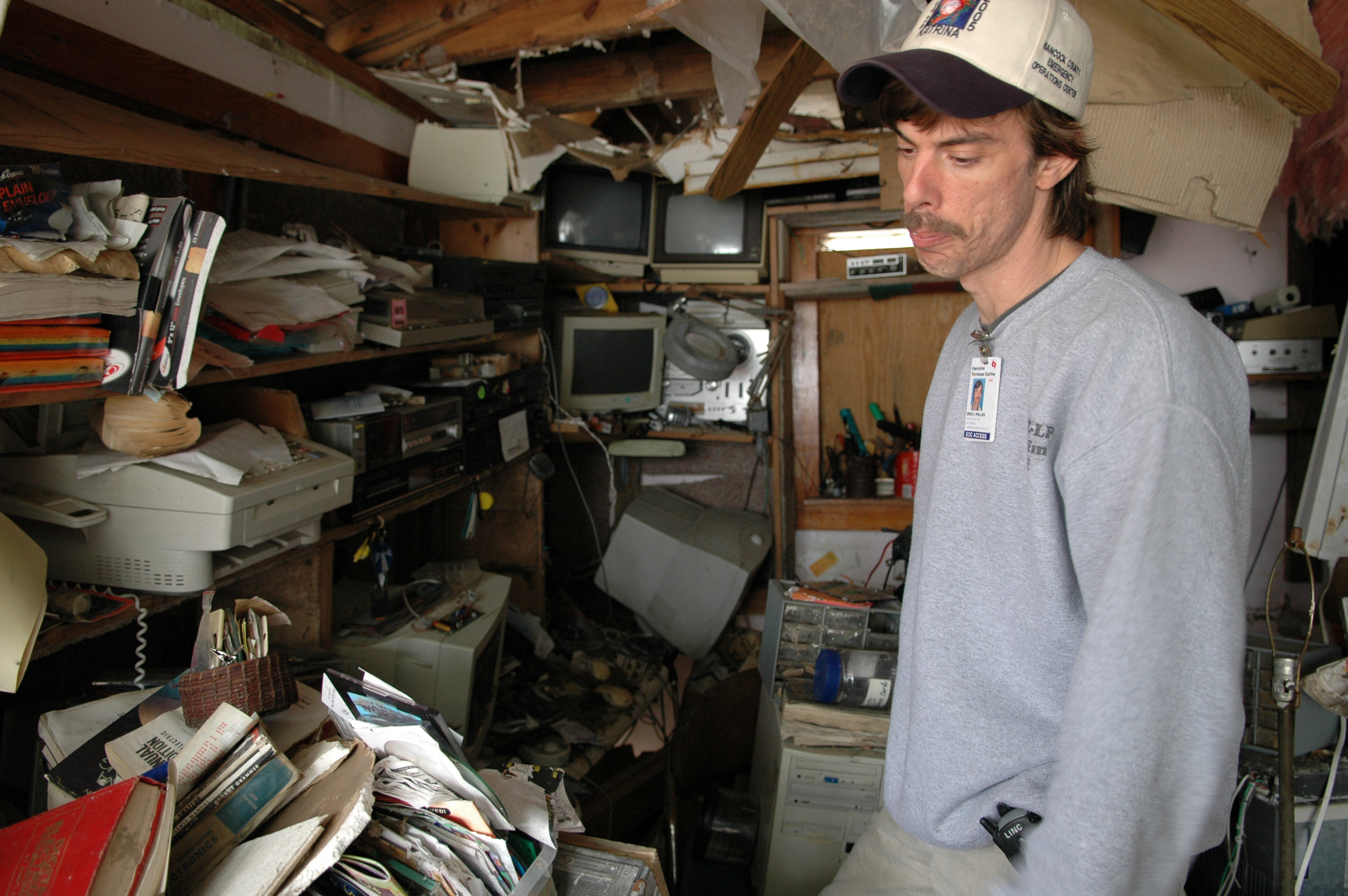
Amateur radio studio after Hurricane Katrina, Hancock County, Miss., 2006

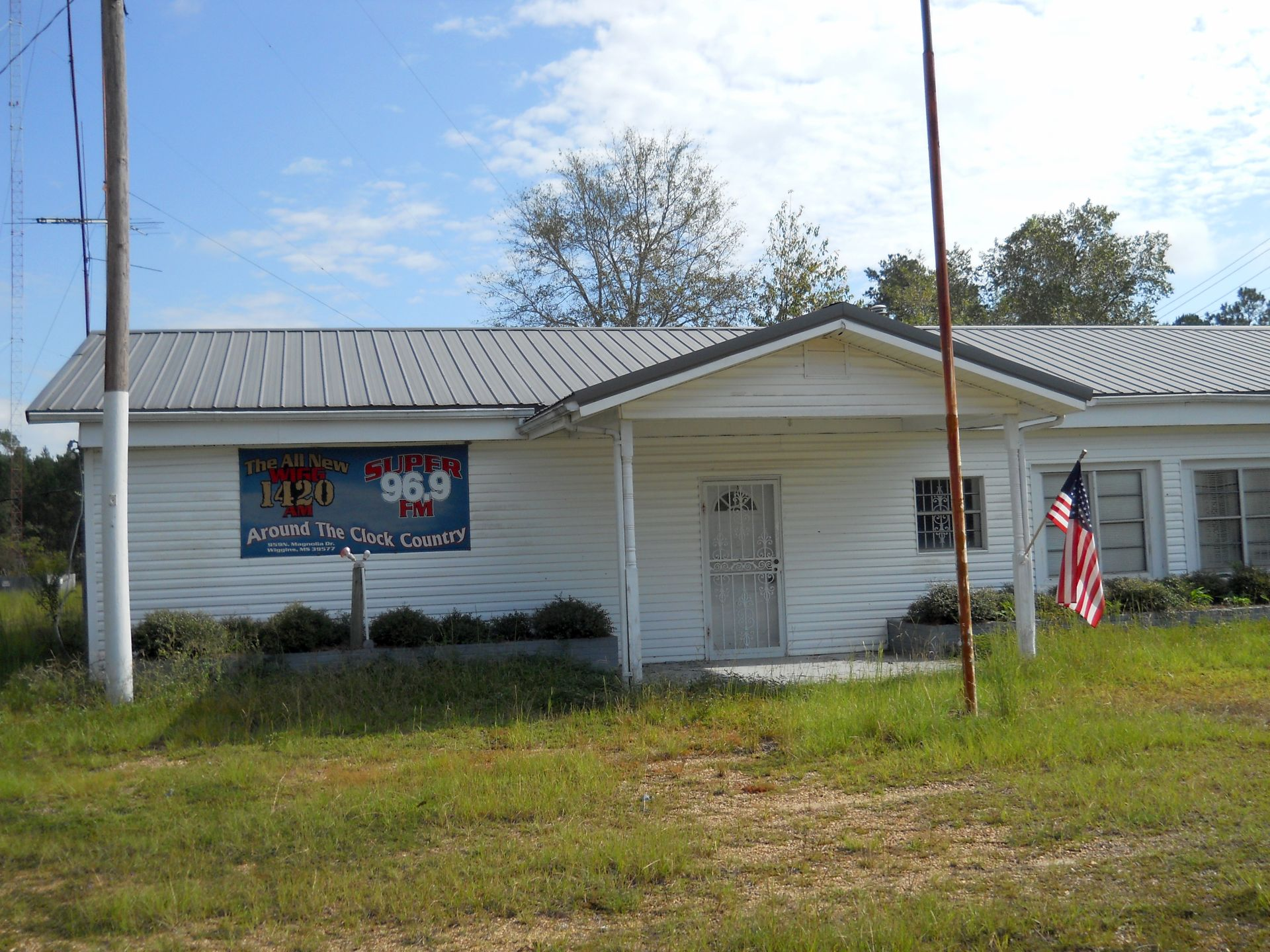
WIGG radio station, Wiggins, Miss., 2015
