= WUCL =

WUCL may refer to:

- WUCL (FM), a radio station (105.7 FM) licensed to serve De Kalb, Mississippi, United States
- WKZB (FM), a radio station (97.9 FM) licensed to serve Newton, Mississippi, which held the call sign WUCL from 2011 to 2016
- WALT-FM, a radio station (102.1 FM) licensed to serve Meridian, Mississippi, which held the call sign WUCL from 2006 to 2010
- WAWR, a radio station (93.5 FM) licensed to serve Remsen, New York, United States, which held the call sign WUCL from 2003 to 2005
