= WCLD =

WCLD may refer to:

- WCLD (AM), a radio station (1490 AM) licensed to Cleveland, Mississippi, United States
- WCLD-FM, a radio station (103.9 FM) licensed to Cleveland, Mississippi, United States
- WCLD, an exchange-traded fund (ETF) created by WisdomTree Investments based on the BVP Nasdaq Emerging Cloud Index
