= WRBE =

WRBE may refer to:

- WRBE-FM, a radio station at 106.9 FM licensed to Lucedale, Mississippi, United States
- WVGG or WRBE, a radio station in Mobile, Alabama at 1440 AM
