= WJXM =

WJXM may refer to:

- WJXM (FM), a radio station (95.1 FM) licensed to Marion, Mississippi, United States
- WKZB (FM), a radio station (97.9 FM) licensed to Newton, Mississippi, United States, known as WJXM in November 2016
- WUCL (FM), a radio station (105.7 FM) licensed to De Kalb, Mississippi, United States, known as WJXM from 1998 to 2016
