= WJNS =

WJNS may refer to:

- WJNS-FM (92.1 FM), a radio station in Bentonia, Mississippi
- WJNS (AM), a defunct radio station in Yazoo City, Mississippi, which held the call sign WJNS from 1983 to 1986
