= WFFF =

WFFF may refer to:

- WFFF-TV, a television station (channel 16, virtual 44) licensed to Burlington, Vermont, United States
- WFFF (AM), a radio station (1360 AM) licensed to Columbia, Mississippi, United States
- WFFF-FM, a radio station (96.7 FM) licensed to Columbia, Mississippi, United States
- The Warner Fall Foliage Festival, an autumnal town-wide celebration in Warner, New Hampshire, United States.
