= WVBG =

WVBG may refer to:

- WVBG (AM), a radio station (1490 AM) licensed to Vicksburg, Mississippi, United States
- WVBG-FM, a radio station (105.5 FM) licensed to Redwood, Mississippi, United States
- WVBG-LD, a low-power television station (channel 17, virtual 25) licensed to serve Greenwich, New York, United States
