= WTYL =

WTYL may refer to:

- WTYL (AM), a radio station (1290 AM) licensed to Tylertown, Mississippi, United States
- WTYL-FM, a radio station (97.7 FM) licensed to Tylertown, Mississippi, United States
