= WHLV (AM) =

Radio station in Hattiesburg, Mississippi (1957–1995)

- Hattiesburg, Mississippi; United States
- Frequency: 1310 kHz

Ownership
- Owner: Horizon Broadcast Communications, Inc.

History
- First air date: August 28, 1957; 68 years ago
- Last air date: 1995; 31 years ago
- Former call signs: WXXX (1957–1983); WKOJ (1983–1986); WGTB (1986–1987)
- Call sign meaning: "Hattiesburg Love"

Technical information
- Facility ID: 27656
- Power: 1,000 watts (daytime only)
- Transmitter coordinates: 33°32′42″N 89°13′58.8″W

WHLV was a radio station on 1310 AM in Hattiesburg, Mississippi, United States, operating between 1957 and 1995. From 1957 to 1983, it was a secular music station under the WXXX call letters; after 1983, it aired Christian programming in various incarnations.

== History ==
=== WXXX ===
Originally authorized as WLEN, WXXX signed on August 28, 1957. The new Hattiesburg radio station was owned by Dave Matison's Broadcast Development Company and maintained a transmitter site along US Route 11 in Petal and studios in Hattiesburg on Broadway Drive. A year after signing on, disc jockey and Jasper County native Jimmy Swan moved to WXXX, the fourth radio station he would broadcast on in town. (His son would later work in sales at WXXX.) WXXX, a daytime-only station, twice attempted to improve its facility: in 1961, it applied to add nighttime service which would have operated on 1290 kHz, only to have the FCC almost immediately return the application, while a move to 1290 was denied in a 1964 docket.

Matison sold WXXX in 1961 to WXXX, Inc., which was owned by station manager J. C. Walker. Echo Broadcasting Corporation acquired the station three years later; general manager Bill Cornelius left Huntsville, Alabama, to run "Triple X". Echo made another petition to make WXXX a full-time station by filing to move it to 1400 kHz, which was not timely filed (and mutually exclusive with the renewal of WFOR). Cornelius sold his share, and control, in Echo to Edd Cantrell in 1968. 1970 brought another sale of WXXX, to Triple X Broadcasting Company, owned by Charles D. Saunders, for $110,000.

The 1970s for WXXX would be dominated by a challenge to the station's existence. Its 1973 license renewal was contested by Concerned Citizens for Better Communications, an African American group which charged that WXXX had no Black employees on its staff of 16 and contacted just three Black people in its ascertainment survey when 30 percent of Hattiesburg was African American. Concerned Citizens described Triple X as a licensee "wedded to preconceived policies" and "unable and unwilling to root his operations in the public he serves". Another group had filed a similar petition against two additional stations owned by Charles Saunders, WSWG-AM-FM in Greenwood, which had additional related issues and were stripped of their licenses. With the hearing underway, the Federal Communications Commission fined the station $2,500 for broadcasting with too much power in 1971. The FCC ultimately handed WXXX a short-term renewal that required the station to implement an affirmative action program and conditioned said renewal on the outcome of the hearing against the Saunders stations in Greenwood. The uncertainty over the proceeding ended up derailing an attempt to sell the station in 1974–75.

The 1976 renewal was just as contested as part of a major challenge to the licenses of 76 Mississippi radio stations by the state branch of the NAACP and seven co-petitioners, including 1973 challenger Concerned Citizens for Better Communications. The challenge claimed that all but three of the targeted stations had discriminatory hiring practices. With this challenge pending, Saunders tried to sell WXXX again, this time to Timberline Broadcasting, for a total of $200,000; earlier in the year, the FCC had denied a license renewal of his Greenwood stations. The Timberline sale application was dropped in 1980.

With the license renewed, Saunders was able to finally sell WXXX—his last broadcast holding—in 1981 to Media Systems, Inc., a subsidiary of the Cathodic Engineering Equipment Company, for $105,000.

=== WKOJ ===
R. Dean Hubbard, through his Awareness Christian Broadcasting, acquired WXXX and Media Systems in October 1983. Hubbard changed the call letters to WKOJ, for "With Knowledge of Jesus", and flipped the station from oldies to a noncommercial Christian format; the seller's owner, Joe Tatum, said that Media Systems was "not as familiar" with broadcast operations as with other industries. WKOJ programming included a morning southern gospel block, middle-of-the-road music in the late afternoon, and an after-school rock program known as "Youth of the Kingdom".

However, WKOJ's finances were saddled with obligations relating to the purchase from Cathodic Engineering. In December 1984, Cathodic sued Awareness, saying it had ceased to make payments on the promissory note that allowed Hubbard to buy the radio station. The station solicited listener donations to try and pay the note and received extensions on its payment deadlines through much of 1985, but by year's end, WKOJ had gone silent.

=== WGTB ===
WKOJ was involuntarily assigned to a court-appointed commissioner, which then transferred the license back to Cathodic; Cathodic then resold the license to Faith Christian Fellowship for $110,000 in June 1986. WKOJ's call letters were changed to WGTB and the station returned to commercial operation.

WGTB had an even shorter run than WKOJ; in November 1986, Horizon Broadcast Communications, owned by the Gibson family, acquired the station for $33,500.

=== WHLV ===
On January 12, 1987, Horizon took over operations of 1310 AM and relaunched the station as "Love 1310" under new WHLV call letters, retaining a Christian format. The station also aired some secular programming, including an audio simulcast of the 6 p.m. newscast of local CBS affiliate WHLT, which debuted in 1989. At that time, Gibson declared that WHLV was having its best success attracting advertisers in the entire history of the 1310 frequency in Hattiesburg. In one case, Horizon "tithed" air time to a local ministry, which received a 30-minute weekday show and time for two fundraisers a year.

Horizon expanded further when it entered into a local marketing agreement to operate WJKX (102.5 FM), which became "Love 102.5". The FM signal enabled Horizon to begin 24-hour programming for the first time. However, in February 1995, the LMA with WJKX ended, with that station gaining another operator; at the same time, 1310 AM went silent for good.
