= WSEL =

WSEL may refer to:

- Web Services Endpoint Language
- WSEL-FM, a radio station (96.7 FM) licensed to Pontotoc, Mississippi, United States
- WOCJ, a radio station (1440 AM) licensed to Pontotoc, Mississippi, which held the call sign WSEL until 2018
- WBMX (FM), a radio station (104.3 FM) licensed to Chicago, Illinois, which held the call sign WSEL from 1953 to 1960
