= WKSO =

WKSO may refer to:

- WKSO-TV, a television station (channel 17, virtual 29) licensed to Somerset, Kentucky, United States
- WKSO (FM), a radio station (97.3 FM) licensed to Natchez, Mississippi, United States
