= WFOR =

WFOR may refer to:

- WFOR (AM), a radio station (1400 AM) licensed to Hattiesburg, Mississippi, United States
- WFOR-TV, a television station (channel 4 analog/22 digital) licensed to Miami, Florida, United States
- WWWW-FM, a radio station (102.9 FM) licensed to Ann Arbor, Michigan, United States, which used the call sign WFOR-FM in 2006
