= WKOR =

WKOR can refer to:

- WKOR-FM, a radio station (94.9 FM) licensed to Columbus, Mississippi, United States
- WKOR (AM), a defunct radio station (980 AM) formerly licensed to Starkville, Mississippi
