= WCMR =

WCMR may refer to:

- WCMR (AM), a radio station (1270 AM) licensed to serve Elkhart, Indiana, United States
- WCMR-FM, a defunct radio station (94.5 FM) formerly licensed to serve Bruce, Mississippi, United States
