= WAMY =

WAMY may refer to:

- World Assembly of Muslim Youth
- WZDX-DT2, a television station licensed to Huntsville, Alabama, United States, also known as WAMY-TV
- WAMY (AM), a radio station (1580 AM) licensed to Amory, Mississippi, United States
- WAMY, ICAO code for Pogogul Airport
