= WQST =

WQST can refer to:

- WQST (AM), a defunct radio station (850 AM) formerly licensed to Forest, Mississippi, United States
- WQST-FM, a radio station (92.5 FM) licensed to Forest, Mississippi
