= WAGR =

WAGR may refer to:

- WAGR (AM), a radio station (1340 AM) licensed to Lumberton, North Carolina, United States
- WAGR-FM, a radio station (102.5 FM) licensed to Lexington, Mississippi, United States
- WAGR syndrome
- Western Australian Government Railways, a former railway operator in Western Australia
- Wilms tumor 1, a protein
- The Windscale Advanced Gas Cooled Reactor at Sellafield
- World Amateur Golf Ranking, the R&A's global ranking system for amateur golfers
