= WXAB =

Radio station in McLain, Mississippi (1992–2010)

- McLain, Mississippi; United States
- Frequency: 96.9 MHz

Programming
- Format: Defunct

Ownership
- Owner: Community Broadcasting Co.
- Sister stations: WIGG

History
- First air date: 1992
- Last air date: February 2, 2010

Technical information
- Facility ID: 12815
- Class: A
- ERP: 4,000 watts
- HAAT: 122 meters (400 ft)
- Transmitter coordinates: 31°6′56″N 88°45′56″W

WXAB (96.9 FM) was an American radio station licensed to McLain, Mississippi, United States. The station was last owned by Community Broadcasting Co. The station, initially assigned "WXAB" on July 17, 1992, was known by that call sign for its entire existence.

In December 1996, Community Broadcasting, Inc., reached an agreement to sell WXAB to TraLyn Broadcasting, Inc. The FCC approved the deal on February 19, 1997, and the transaction was formally consummated on July 1, 1997. This acquisition was part of a four-station deal that also included sister stations WLUN (95.3 FM in Wiggins, Mississippi), WIGG (1420 AM in Wiggins), and WESV (96.5 FM in Richton, Mississippi). However, TraLyn Broadcasting's tenure as owner of these stations was financially unstable and a coalition of creditors and former owners filed suit against the company.

As the result of the December 2005 settlement of a lawsuit by Community Broadcasting, Inc., and other parties against TraLyn Broadcasting, Inc., and related parties, TraLyn Broadcasting, et al., agreed to pay $245,000 in cash to Community Broadcasting, et al., and convey the assets and broadcast licenses of both WXAB and WIGG. The FCC approved this transfer on April 26, 2006, and the transaction was formally consummated on May 24, 2006.

The station fell silent for the final time on February 2, 2010. In its February 4, 2010, filing with the FCC, the station's owner stated that WXAB had gone off the air "due to the illness of its principal manager, A.R. Byrd", noting that he was "unable to attend to the necessary station duties." In late February, citing the manager's ongoing medical issues, the station applied for special temporary authority to remain silent. The FCC granted this authority on March 30, 2010, with a scheduled expiration of September 28, 2010. The Commission cautioned the station that if it did not resume broadcasting by 12:01 a.m. on February 3, 2011, that its broadcast license was subject to automatic forfeiture and cancellation.

In July 2011, the FCC determined that the station had not resumed broadcasting and that its license was deemed automatically expired on February 3, 2011. The "WXAB" call sign was deleted from the FCC database on July 18, 2011.
