= WBLE =

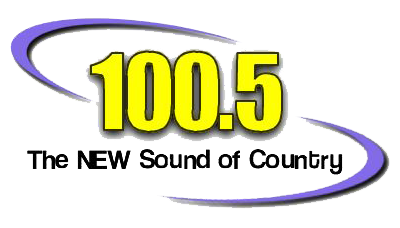
- Batesville, Mississippi; United States
- Frequency: 100.5 MHz
- Branding: 100.5 The New Sound Of Country

Programming
- Format: New/Progressive Country

Ownership
- Owner: J. Boyd Ingram and Carol B. Ingram
- Sister stations: WHKL

History
- First air date: 1978

Technical information
- Licensing authority: FCC
- Facility ID: 4049
- Class: C2
- ERP: 50,000 watts
- HAAT: 150.0 meters (492.1 ft)
- Transmitter coordinates: 34°22′44″N 89°45′57″W

Links
- Public license information: Public file; LMS
- Webcast: Listen Live
- Website: wble101.com

WBLE (100.5 FM) is a radio station broadcasting a New Country music format, licensed to Batesville, Mississippi, United States. The station is currently owned by J. Boyd Ingram and Carol B. Ingram.
