= KZKR =

- Jonesville, Louisiana; United States
- Broadcast area: Natchez micropolitan area
- Frequency: 105.1 MHz
- Branding: Rock 105

Programming
- Language: English
- Format: Classic rock

Ownership
- Owner: Listen Up Yall Media; (First Natchez Radio Group Inc)
- Sister stations: WQNZ, WKSO, WNAT, WWUU

History
- First air date: 2001; 25 years ago (as KTYX)
- Former call signs: KTYX (1998–2003); KTGV (2003–2010)

Technical information
- Licensing authority: FCC
- Facility ID: 82888
- Class: A
- ERP: 900 watts
- HAAT: 249 meters (817 ft)
- Transmitter coordinates: 31°40′08″N 91°41′30″W

Links
- Public license information: Public file; LMS
- Webcast: Listen Live
- Website: KZKR Online

KZKR (105.1 MHz, "Rock 105") is an American radio station licensed to Jonesville, Louisiana. The station is broadcasting a classic rock format. KZKR serves the Natchez micropolitan area. The station is owned by Listen Up Yall Media LLC.
