= WELZ (AM) =

- Belzoni, Mississippi; United States
- Frequency: 1460 kHz

Programming
- Format: Blues

Ownership
- Owner: (ZOO-BEL BROADCASTING, LLC)
- Sister stations: WBYP

Technical information
- Licensing authority: FCC
- Facility ID: 28116
- Class: D
- Power: 1,000 watts daytime only
- Transmitter coordinates: 33°10′24″N 90°28′51″W
- Translators: W262DE (100.3 MHz, Yazoo City)

Links
- Public license information: Public file; LMS

WELZ is an A.M. radio station licensed to operate by the Federal Communications Commission during daytime hours only on 1460 kilohertz. It is owned by Zoo-Bel Broadcasting, LLC. Its community of license is Belzoni, Mississippi. Zoo-Bel also owns WBYP in Belzoni.
