= WBKN =

- Brookhaven, Mississippi; United States
- Frequency: 92.1 MHz
- Branding: B92 The Boss

Programming
- Format: Country
- Affiliations: Citadel Media, Dial Global

Ownership
- Owner: North Shore Broadcasting Co., Inc.
- Sister stations: WMJU

History
- Former call signs: WMRQ (1976–1985)

Technical information
- Licensing authority: FCC
- Facility ID: 6318
- Class: A
- ERP: 3,400 watts
- HAAT: 92 meters (302 ft)
- Transmitter coordinates: 31°33′49.0″N 90°26′27.3″W

Links
- Public license information: Public file; LMS
- Website: brookhavenbroadcasting.wordpress.com/b-92-the-boss/

WBKN (92.1 FM, "B92 Country") is an American radio station broadcasting a country music format. Licensed to Brookhaven, Mississippi, the station currently features programming from Citadel Media and Dial Global. The station is owned by North Shore Broadcasting Co., Inc.

On September 21, 2011, Charles W. Dowdy, acting as the sole owner of license holder Brookhaven Broadcasting, Inc., dissolved the corporation and assigned the broadcast licenses it held (WMJU and WBKN) to himself acting as debtor in possession before initiating a Chapter 11 bankruptcy. The FCC approved the license transfer on December 19, 2011.

On October 25, 2019, the station's license was transferred to North Shore Broadcasting Co., Inc.
