= WMJU =

Coordinates: 31.559°N 90.674°W

- Bude, Mississippi; United States
- Broadcast area: Brookhaven, Mississippi
- Frequency: 104.3 MHz
- Branding: Majic 104.3

Programming
- Format: Top 40 (CHR)

Ownership
- Owner: North Shore Broadcasting Co., Inc.

History
- First air date: August 30, 1999

Technical information
- Licensing authority: FCC
- Facility ID: 76262
- Class: C3
- ERP: 25,000 watts
- HAAT: 100 meters (330 ft)

Links
- Public license information: Public file; LMS

WMJU (104.3 FM) is a radio station licensed to Bude, Mississippi, and its transmitter signal covered two small towns called Brookhaven, Mississippi and McComb, Mississippi which plays Top 40/CHR music.

The station is owned by North Shore Broadcasting Co., Inc.

On September 21, 2011, Charles W. Dowdy, acting as the sole owner of license holder Brookhaven Broadcasting, Inc., dissolved the corporation and assigned the broadcast licenses it held (WMJU and WBKN) to himself acting as debtor in possession before initiating a Chapter 11 bankruptcy. The FCC approved the license transfer on December 19, 2011.

On October 25, 2019, the station's license was transferred to North Shore Broadcasting Co., Inc.
