= WELO =

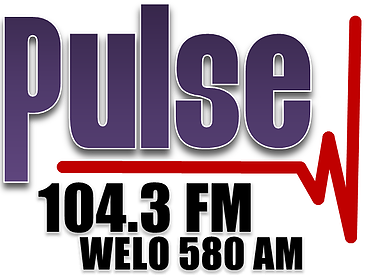
- Tupelo, Mississippi; United States
- Broadcast area: Tupelo, Mississippi
- Frequency: 580 kHz
- Branding: Pulse 104.3 and 580 AM

Programming
- Format: Classic soul

Ownership
- Owner: Jmd, Inc.
- Sister stations: WSYE, WWMS, WZLQ

History
- First air date: May 15, 1941
- Former call signs: WWPR (1987)
- Call sign meaning: Tupelo

Technical information
- Licensing authority: FCC
- Facility ID: 58829
- Class: D
- Power: 770 watts (day); 95 watts (night)
- Transmitter coordinates: 34°14′17″N 88°41′43″W
- Translator: 104.3 W282AS (Saltillo)

Links
- Public license information: Public file; LMS
- Website: www.pulseoftupelo.com

WELO (580 AM) is a radio station broadcasting a Classic soul format. Licensed to Tupelo, Mississippi, United States, the station serves the Tupelo area. The station is currently owned by Jmd, Inc.

== History ==
WELO began broadcasting on May 15, 1941, on South Spring Street, Tupelo, above the Black and White dry goods store. Frank Kyle Spain and Jim Green, Tupelo High School students, became station engineers to complete building the station after Green's older brother became ill and unable to finish his engineering contract responsibilities. The station originally broadcast with 250 watts on 1490 kHz. In 1959, it switched to 580 kHz with a power of 1,000 watts directional. Studio and transmitter were located on Highway 45 North.

Some local talents were involved in starting up the station, among them the announcer Charlie Boren and the bandleader and radio technician Archie Mackey. The hillbilly star of the station in 1946 was a 23-year-old native of Smithville, Mississippi, Carvel Lee Ausborn, who went by the name of Mississippi Slim.

Ernest Bowen, who had tangential musical connections with Elvis Presley, became a longtime general manager at WELO. Presley occasionally performed on Mississippi Slim's radio program "Singin' and Pickin' Hillbilly." Jack Christal was a long-time employee, and was well known for his sports broadcasts.

At one time, WTUP and WELO were sister stations.

The station now plays a classic soul format.

== Translator ==
In addition to the main station on 580 kHz, WELO is relayed by an FM translator in order to widen its broadcast area, especially at night when the AM frequency reduces power to 95 watts. The translator also gives listeners the option of FM with stereo high fidelity sound.

Broadcast translator for WELO
Call sign	Frequency	City of license	FID	ERP (W)	HAAT	Class	FCC info
W282AS	104.3 FM	Saltillo, Mississippi	152544	250	103 m (338 ft)	D	LMS
