= WNSL =

Radio station in Laurel, Mississippi

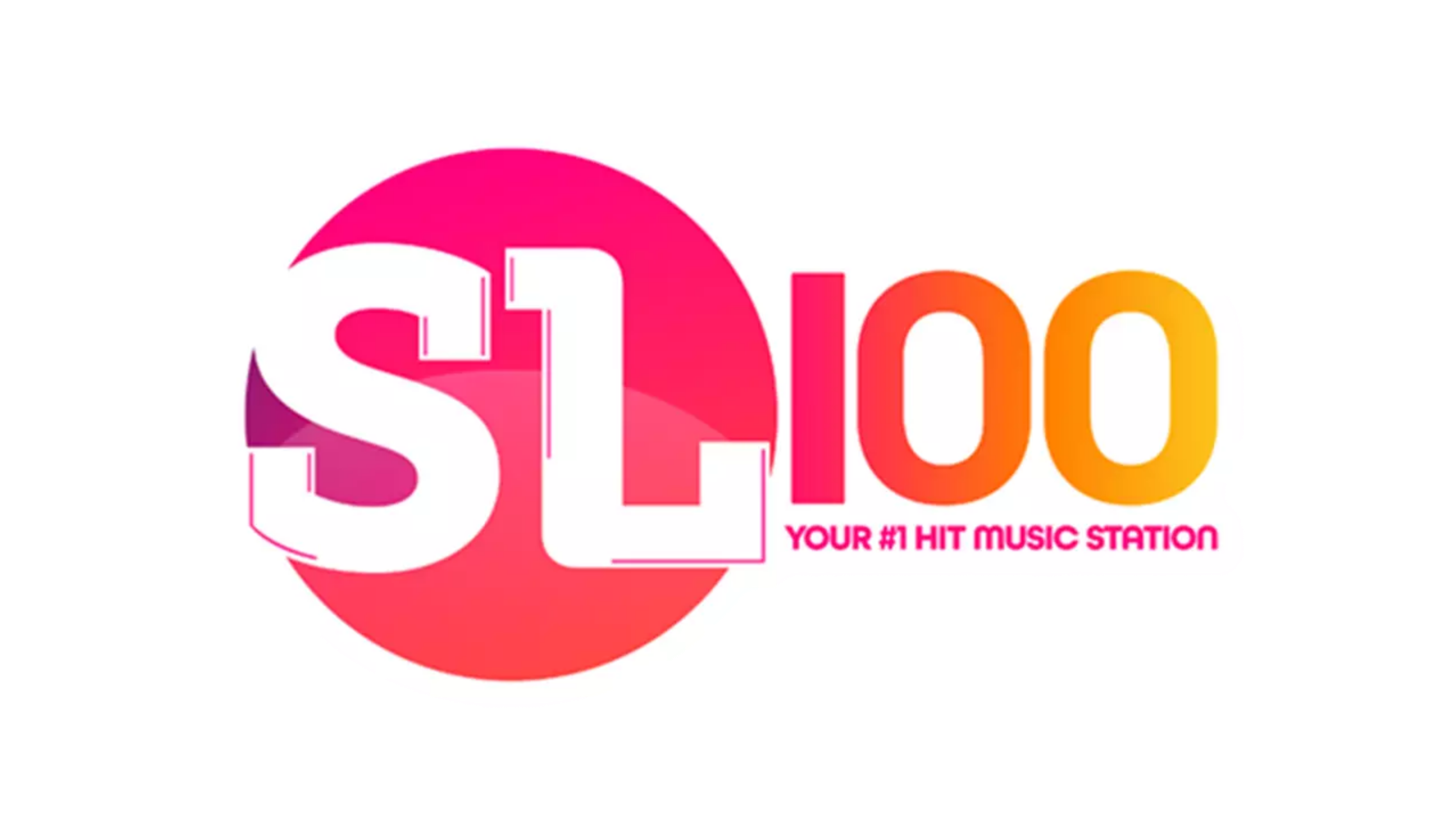
- Laurel, Mississippi; United States
- Broadcast area: Laurel-Hattiesburg
- Frequency: 100.3 MHz
- Branding: SL100

Programming
- Language: English
- Format: Contemporary hit radio
- Affiliations: Premiere Networks

Ownership
- Owner: iHeartMedia, Inc.; (iHM Licenses, LLC)
- Sister stations: WJKX; WZLD

History
- First air date: March 10, 1959
- Former call signs: WNSL-FM (1959–1979)
- Call sign meaning: "Voice of the New South in Laurel"

Technical information
- Licensing authority: FCC
- Facility ID: 16784
- Class: C0
- ERP: 100,000 watts
- HAAT: 324 meters (1,063 ft)
- Transmitter coordinates: 31°31′37.60″N 89°08′07.20″W

Links
- Public license information: Public file; LMS
- Webcast: Listen live (via iHeartRadio)
- Website: sl100.iheart.com

WNSL (100.3 FM, "SL100") is a top 40 (CHR) music formatted commercial radio station licensed to Laurel, Mississippi, United States, serving the Laurel-Hattiesburg Nielsen Audio market. The station is owned by iHeartMedia and the license is held by iHM Licenses, LLC. The studios are located with other sister stations on U.S. Highway 98 in West Hattiesburg.

== Programming ==
SL100 is an affiliate of the nationally syndicated programs Johnjay and Rich and On Air with Ryan Seacrest.

In recent years, the station ID can be heard as "WNSL Hattiesburg-Laurel".

== History ==
WNSL-FM went on the air March 10, 1959, as a simulcast of WNSL AM 1260 (today's WHJA at 890 AM). WNSL-AM-FM was founded by Granville Walters, a former news reporter and host at WAML, the first radio station in Laurel. Walters was the general manager of WNSL until 1983 and for most of those years, he reported the news in the morning drive slot. For years, WNSL-AM-FM had a country music format (the AM moniker was "Dixie's 1260" for a time), and it was famous for the "Masonite Whistle", a music and news program broadcast from 6:00 - 6:30 a.m. and sponsored by Masonite Corporation, for the benefit of its employees. A common phrase used in the program was "for those getting up or those getting in", presumably to cater to employees of the night and morning shifts. This program continued as a simulcast on both AM and FM stations, despite changes in formats and call letters, until 1984. At one point, the FM format was changed to R&B and was known as "Soul-100" before adopting the current Top 40 format in the late 1970s. The AM format remained country until the change in FM format. Then, the AM station broke off completely as R&B outlet WQIS "Super Q 1260".

In 1981, WNSL built a new transmitter tower near Moselle, with an ERP of 33,000 watts. In 1985, when WNSL built a new transmitter tower near Ellisville, the transmitter in Moselle became the new transmitter tower for WQIS. WNSL successfully tapped into the Hattiesburg market, targeting students at the University of Southern Mississippi and competing with Top 40 station WHSY-FM ("Y-104"). In 1983, Granville Walters retired and sold his part in WNSL/WQIS to Bob Holladay, who was the son of Mr. Walters' partner, Ed Holladay of Meridian. Under Bob Holladay's watch, the station gained prominence as a Top 40 station. Holladay managed to lure DJs from other markets, particularly Meridian, to WNSL. The new tower built in 1985 was 1,000 feet over average terrain, and WNSL upgraded to an ERP of 100,000 watts. This new tower was capable of handling multiple stations and initially was shared with WHER (103.7 MHz) in Hattiesburg, an easy listening FM station; upon the inauguration of the new tower, WNSL changed its legal identification to WNSL Laurel-Hattiesburg-Meridian in an effort to tap into the Meridian radio market and compete with Top 40 station WJDQ "Q-101". As part of the campaign, Holladay hired Mike Golden, a former news anchor with WTOK-TV in Meridian, as news director. The station also arranged for a relayed broadcast at 100.5 on cable in Meridian, as the radio signal was not strong in areas on the north side of Meridian. This campaign proved to yield little fruit, and within 18 months, the legal identification was changed back to WNSL Laurel-Hattiesburg and Mike Golden was gone.

Holladay expanded the company through acquisition of other stations but eventually sold WNSL and WQIS to Design Media in 1988. Design Media sold the stations to Cumulus Media in 1999. In October 2000, Cumulus announced an agreement to sell this station to Clear Channel Communications as part of a large station swap and sale, including seven Cumulus stations in the Laurel-Hattiesburg radio market. The deal was approved by the FCC on December 19, 2000, and the transaction was consummated on January 18, 2001.

As part of the transition, around 2002, these stations consolidated studios to a space on U.S. 98 in West Hattiesburg. The building where the WNSL studios were for over 40 years in Laurel has been torn down, leaving an old transmitter shed, the foundation, and the parking lot.

Previous logo, in use from 1999 to 2026
