= WWZQ =

Coordinates: 33°48′32″N 88°32′33″W

- Aberdeen, Mississippi; United States
- Frequency: 1240 kHz

Programming
- Format: Talk radio

Ownership
- Owner: Stanford Communications, Inc.
- Sister stations: WAFM, WAMY (AM)

History
- First air date: 1952
- Former call signs: WMPA

Technical information
- Licensing authority: FCC
- Facility ID: 65201
- Class: C
- Power: 1,000 watts

Links
- Public license information: Public file; LMS
- Website: WWZQ's website

WWZQ (1240 AM) is a radio station licensed to Aberdeen, Mississippi, United States. The station airs a Talk radio format, and is currently owned by Stanford Communications, Inc.
