= WWSL =

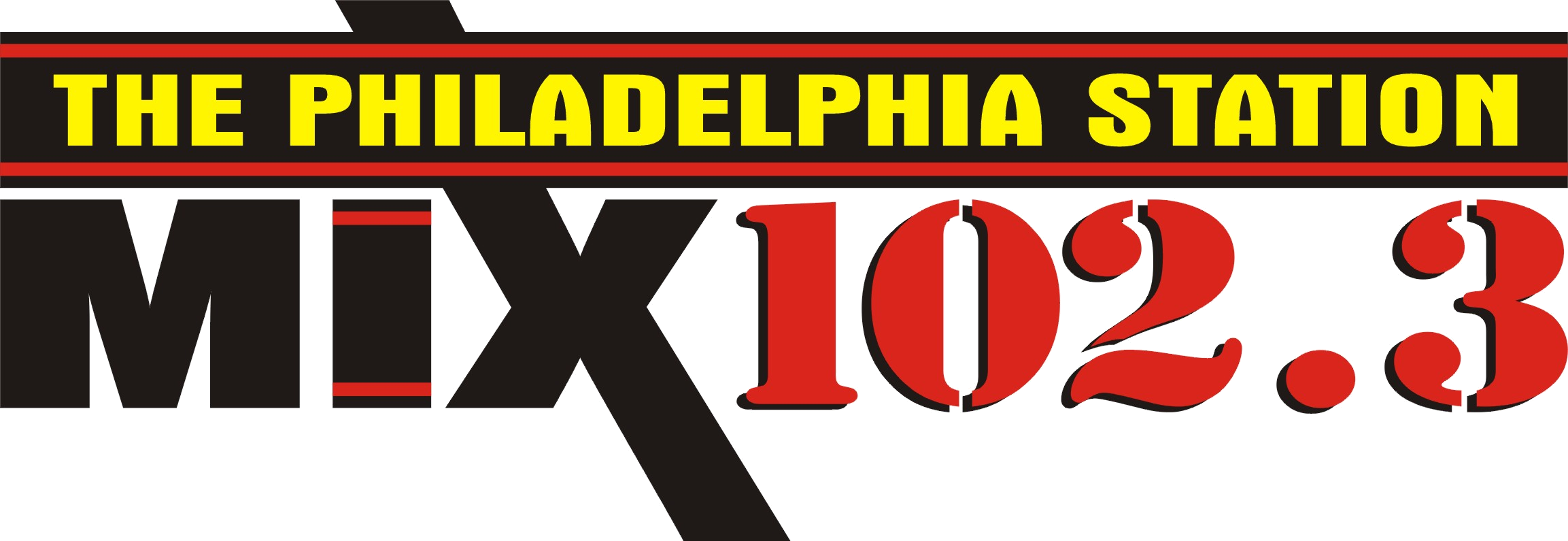
- Philadelphia, Mississippi; United States
- Frequency: 102.3 MHz
- Branding: Mix 102

Programming
- Format: Hot adult contemporary

Ownership
- Owner: H & G C
- Sister stations: WHOC

History
- First air date: January 1, 1981

Technical information
- Licensing authority: FCC
- Facility ID: 25742
- Class: A
- ERP: 4,900 watts
- HAAT: 111 meters (364 ft)
- Transmitter coordinates: 32°43′35″N 89°5′56″W

Links
- Public license information: Public file; LMS
- Website: whocradio.com

WWSL (102.3 FM) is a radio station broadcasting a hot adult contemporary music format. Licensed to Philadelphia, Mississippi, United States, the station is currently owned by H & G C.
