= WMLC =

- Monticello, Mississippi; United States
- Frequency: 1270 kHz

Programming
- Format: Urban gospel

Ownership
- Owner: Charles Tillman; (Tillman Broadcasting Network, Inc.)

History
- First air date: 1970
- Last air date: May 20, 2022

Technical information
- Facility ID: 12046
- Class: D
- Power: 1,000 watts day; 53 watts night
- Transmitter coordinates: 31°33′29″N 90°8′0″W

WMLC (1270 AM) was a radio station broadcasting an urban gospel format. WMLC was licensed to serve the community of Monticello, Mississippi, United States. The station was last owned by Charles Tillman, through licensee Tillman Broadcasting Network, Inc.

Tillman Broadcasting Network surrendered WMLC's license to the Federal Communications Commission (FCC) on May 19, 2022, and the FCC cancelled the license on May 20, 2022.
