= WNAT =

- Natchez, Mississippi; United States
- Broadcast area: Natchez micropolitan area
- Frequency: 1450 kHz
- Branding: Jam'n 106.3

Programming
- Language: English
- Format: Rhythmic AC

Ownership
- Owner: Listen Up Yall Media; (First Natchez Radio Group Inc)
- Sister stations: KZKR, WKSO, WQNZ, WWUU

History
- First air date: 1949
- Former call signs
- Call sign meaning: W NATchez

Technical information
- Licensing authority: FCC
- Facility ID: 21605
- Class: C
- Power: 1,000 watts unlimited
- Transmitter coordinates: 31°33′33″N 91°23′30″W
- Translator: 106.3 W292FK (Natchez)

Links
- Public license information: Public file; LMS
- Website: https://listenupyall.com/

WNAT (1450 kHz, "Jam'n 106.3") is an American radio station licensed to Natchez, Mississippi. The station is owned by Listen Up Yall Media and airs a rhythmic AC format.

The station was assigned the WNAT call letters by the Federal Communications Commission on May 5, 1949.

On November 25, 2019, WNAT changed their format from news/talk to rhythmic adult contemporary, branded as "Jam'n 106.3".
