= WADI =

- Corinth, Mississippi; United States
- Broadcast area: Corinth, Mississippi; Tupelo, Mississippi; Muscle Shoals, Alabama
- Frequency: 95.3 MHz
- Branding: "The Bee"

Programming
- Format: Country

Ownership
- Owner: The Eagle Radio Network, Inc.
- Sister stations: WOWL WBIP

Technical information
- Licensing authority: FCC
- Facility ID: 31412
- Class: A
- ERP: 2,600 watts
- HAAT: 144 meters (472 feet)
- Transmitter coordinates: 34°55′47″N 88°24′37″W
- Translator: (98.7 MHz) W254AA (Colbert Heights, AL)
- Repeaters: WBIP (1400 kHz, Booneville)

Links
- Public license information: Public file; LMS
- Webcast: Listen live
- Website: www.953thebee.com

WADI (95.3 FM, "The Bee") is a radio station licensed to serve the community of Corinth, Mississippi, United States. The station is owned by The Eagle Radio Network, Inc. It broadcasts a hot country music format.

The station was assigned the WADI call letters by the Federal Communications Commission.

As of April 30, 2022, the programming is now also broadcast on translator frequency W254AA which serves the community of Colbert Heights, Alabama and the Quad-Cities of North Alabama through an agreement between owners.
