= WAFM (United States) =

Radio station in Amory, Mississippi

- Amory, Mississippi; United States
- Broadcast area: Aberdeen, Mississippi; Monroe County, Mississippi
- Frequency: 95.7 MHz
- Branding: FM 95

Programming
- Format: Oldies

Ownership
- Owner: Stanford Communications, Inc.
- Sister stations: WAMY, WWZQ

History
- First air date: 1974
- Call sign meaning: Amory FM

Technical information
- Licensing authority: FCC
- Facility ID: 62222
- Class: A
- ERP: 6,000 watts
- HAAT: 83 meters (272 ft)
- Transmitter coordinates: 33°58′33.0″N 88°29′29.0″W

Links
- Public license information: Public file; LMS
- Website: fm95radio.com

WAFM (95.7 FM) is an oldies formatted radio station licensed to Amory, Mississippi, serving Amory and Monroe County, Mississippi. WAFM is owned and operated by Stanford Communications, Inc.
