= WAID =

- Clarksdale, Mississippi; United States
- Frequency: 106.5 MHz
- Branding: Power 106.5

Programming
- Format: Urban contemporary
- Affiliations: AP News; Compass Media Networks

Ownership
- Owner: Radio Cleveland
- Sister stations: WCLD, WCLD-FM, WKDJ-FM, WMJW

Technical information
- Licensing authority: FCC
- Facility ID: 54531
- Class: C2
- ERP: 50,000 watts
- HAAT: 90 meters
- Transmitter coordinates: 34°9′22″N 90°37′52″W

Links
- Public license information: Public file; LMS
- Webcast: Listen Live
- Website: WAID Online

WAID (106.5 FM) is a radio station broadcasting an urban contemporary format. Licensed to Clarksdale, Mississippi, United States, the station, also known as "Power 106.5," is currently owned by Radio Cleveland and features programming from AP News and Compass Media Networks . The station broadcasts the nationally syndicated Tom Joyner Morning Show and Doug Banks show.
