= WPMO =

Coordinates: 30°23′1.7″N 88°32′7.1″W

- Pascagoula-Moss Point, Mississippi; United States
- Frequency: 1580 kHz
- Branding: 1580 The Game

Programming
- Format: Sports
- Affiliations: Infinity Sports Network

Ownership
- Owner: Noah Britt; (Tri City Radio, LLC)
- Sister stations: WVGG

History
- First air date: September 1951
- Former call signs: WPMP (1951–1986); WPMO (1986–1989); WKNN (1989–1991); WZZJ (1991–2005); WPMP (2005–2011)
- Call sign meaning: Pascagoula Moss Point

Technical information
- Licensing authority: FCC
- Facility ID: 32850
- Class: D
- Power: 1,500 watts (day); 115 watts (night)

Links
- Public license information: Public file; LMS

WPMO (1580 AM) is a commercial radio station licensed to Pascagoula-Moss Point, Mississippi, United States. The station airs a sports format, and is owned by Noah Britt, through licensee Tri City Radio, LLC. Most programming comes from the Infinity Sports Network. By day, WPMO's studios and transmitter are on Telephone Road in Pascagoula.

== History ==
The station first signed on as WPMP in September 1951. Its call sign changed to WPMO in March 2011. It had also used the WPMO call letters in the late-1980s.
