= WMXI =

Radio station in Ellisville, Mississippi

- Ellisville, Mississippi; United States
- Broadcast area: Laurel-Hattiesburg
- Frequency: 107.1 MHz
- Branding: News Talk 107-1

Programming
- Language: English
- Format: Talk radio
- Affiliations: Fox News Radio; Premiere Networks; USA Radio Network; Westwood One

Ownership
- Owner: Heathcock Broadcasting Associates, LLC
- Sister stations: WFOR

History
- First air date: April 10, 1989
- Former frequencies: 98.1 MHz (1989–2025)

Technical information
- Licensing authority: FCC
- Facility ID: 54655
- Class: A
- ERP: 1,500 watts; 3,500 watts (CP)
- HAAT: 198 meters (650 ft)
- Transmitter coordinates: 31°31′36.10″N 89°08′10.20″W

Links
- Public license information: Public file; LMS
- Webcast: Listen live
- Website: wmxi.com

WMXI (107.1 FM, "News Talk 107-1") is a commercial radio station broadcasting a news/talk format. Licensed to Ellisville, Mississippi, United States, the station serves the Laurel-Hattiesburg Arbitron market.

WMXI has a construction permit to increase its ERP to 3,500 watts.

== Programming ==
As of September 2025, WMXI's weekday program schedule includes The O'Reilly Update, Pinebelt Daybreak, The Brian Kilmeade Show, The Vince Show with Vince Coglianese, The Sean Hannity Show, and The Mark Levin Show. Most hours begin with an update from Fox News Radio. There is also a one-minute news update at the bottom of most hours.

== History ==
WMXI signed on for the first time on April 10, 1989, with a soft adult contemporary format as "Max 98". In April 2001, the station changed its format to dance-leaning Top 40 as "98.1 The Hot FM" through an LMA with Millennium Communications of Sicklerville, NJ. When the LMA ended in September 2002, WMXI became "98X" with a format change to alternative rock. In October 2002, "Talk Radio 98.1 WMXI" debuted when the news/talk format of then-sister station WXHB was moved to WMXI. WXHB's format was changed to southern gospel and was then sold to Blakeney Communications, Inc.

Former logo

WMXI moved to 107.1 MHz in January 2025 and increased its ERP from 1,000 to 1,500 watts.
