= WHOC =

- Philadelphia, Mississippi; United States
- Broadcast area: Philadelphia; Neshoba County
- Frequency: 1490 kHz
- Branding: 1490AM and 93.7FM WHOC

Programming
- Format: Talk and sports

Ownership
- Owner: WHOC, Inc.
- Sister stations: WWSL

History
- First air date: July 31, 1948

Technical information
- Licensing authority: FCC
- Facility ID: 72308
- Class: C
- Power: 1,000 watts (unlimited)
- Transmitter coordinates: 32°45′52.0″N 89°7′48.0″W

Links
- Public license information: Public file; LMS
- Webcast: Listen live
- Website: whocradio.com

WHOC is a talk and sports formatted broadcast radio station. The station is licensed to Philadelphia, Mississippi, United States, and serves Philadelphia and Neshoba County in Mississippi. WHOC is owned and operated by WHOC, Inc. WHOC has carried that callsign since its inception.

== Translator ==
In addition to WHOC's primary frequency, its programming is simulcast on the following translator station, on the FM band, to widen WHOC's broadcast area.

Broadcast translator for WHOC
Call sign	Frequency	City of license	FID	ERP (W)	HAAT	Class	Transmitter coordinates	FCC info
W229CW	93.7 FM	Philadelphia, Mississippi	201153	250	42 m (138 ft)	D	32°46′2.80″N 89°7′47.20″W	LMS
