= WXTN =

- Benton, Mississippi; United States
- Frequency: 1000 kHz

Programming
- Format: Urban contemporary gospel

Ownership
- Owner: Holmes County Broadcasting Company, LLC
- Sister stations: WAGR-FM

History
- First air date: October 23, 1959
- Call sign meaning: XTN = "Christian"

Technical information
- Licensing authority: FCC
- Facility ID: 27486
- Class: D
- Power: 5,000 watts day
- Transmitter coordinates: 33°06′39″N 90°02′21″W

Links
- Public license information: Public file; LMS
- Webcast: Listen Live
- Website: wxtnam1000.com

WXTN (1000 AM) is an American radio station licensed to serve Benton, Mississippi, United States. The station, established in 1959, is owned by Holmes County Broadcasting Company, LLC. Former owner Brad Cothran died in a one-car traffic collision on May 30, 2009, and the station's license was transferred to Holmes County Broadcasting effective June 29, 2012.

The station is an AM daytimer, limited to daylight-only broadcast operations to protect the nighttime signals of KNWN in Seattle, WMVP in Chicago, and XEOY in Mexico City. The station was assigned the call sign "WXTN" by the Federal Communications Commission (FCC).

WXTN broadcasts an urban contemporary gospel radio format.
