= WIGG (AM) =

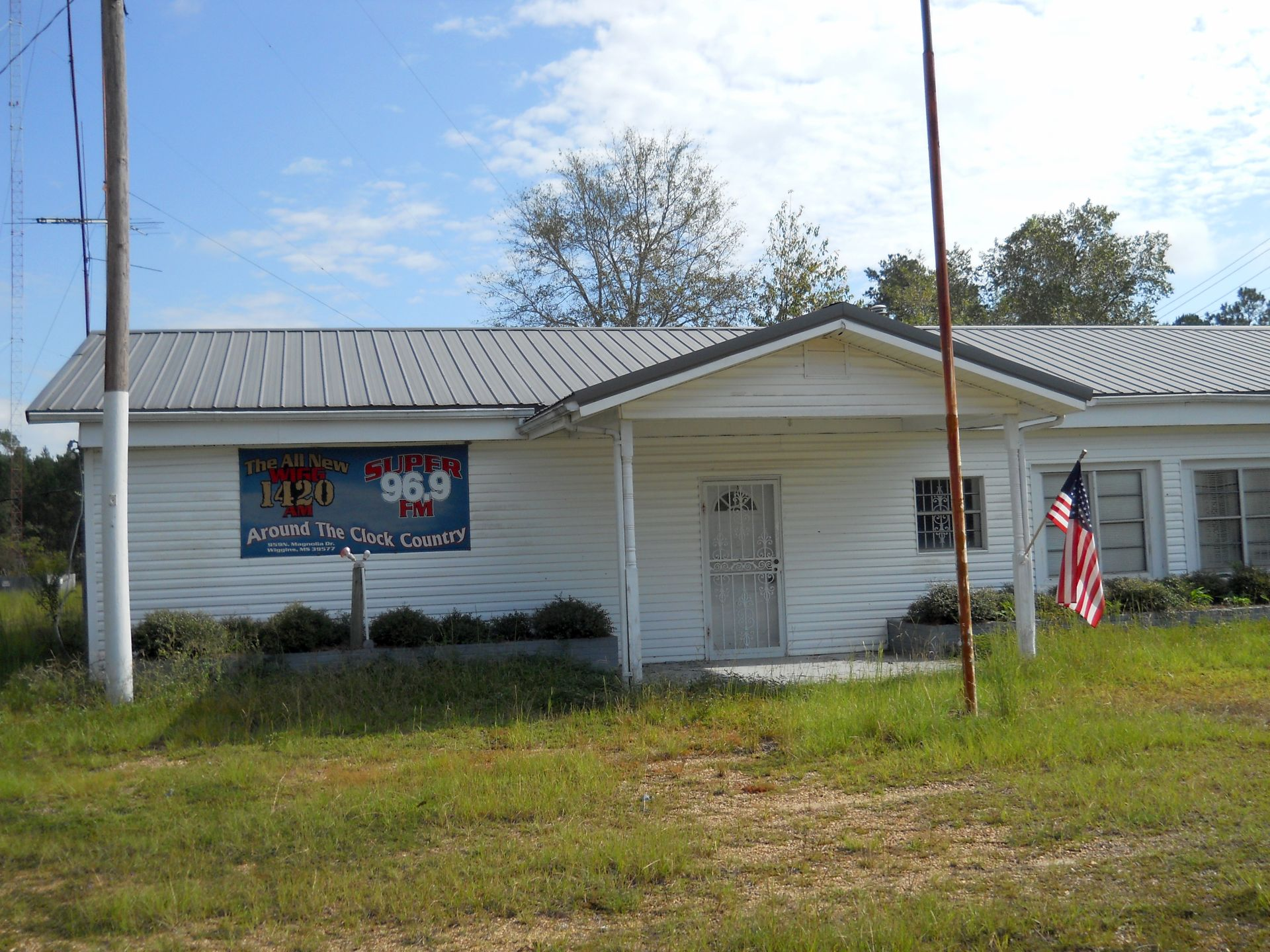

Wiggins, Mississippi; United States
- Broadcast area: Stone County, Mississippi
- Frequency: 1420 kHz

Programming
- Language: English
- Format: Defunct

Ownership
- Owner: Community Broadcasting Company, Inc.

History
- First air date: February 1968
- Last air date: February 2, 2010
- Call sign meaning: Wiggins, Mississippi

Technical information
- Facility ID: 12811
- Class: D
- Power: 5,000 watts (day); 78 watts (night)
- Transmitter coordinates: 30°52′18″N 89°09′00″W

WIGG (1420 AM) was an American radio station licensed to serve Wiggins, the county seat of Stone County, Mississippi. The station, established in 1968, was last owned by Community Broadcasting Company, Inc.

Before falling silent in February 2010, WIGG broadcast an Americana/Roots music radio format.

== History ==
WIGG began broadcast operations in February 1968 on 1420 kHz with a 1,000-watt signal, daytime only, to serve Stone County, Mississippi. The station, originally owned by Stone County Broadcasters, Inc., was assigned the call sign "WIGG" by the Federal Communications Commission (FCC).

Clinco, Inc., owned by James E. Clinton, made a deal to acquire WIGG from Stone County Broadcasters, Inc. The sale was completed in November 1971. In January 1979, Community Broadcasting, Inc., made a deal to purchase WIGG from Clinco, Inc. The FCC approved the sale and the transaction was formally consummated on October 17, 1979.

In December 1996, Community Broadcasting, Inc., reached an agreement to sell WIGG to TraLyn Broadcasting, Inc. The FCC approved the deal on February 19, 1997, and the transaction was formally consummated on July 1, 1997. This acquisition was part of a four-station deal that also included sister stations WLUN (95.3 FM in Wiggins), WXAB (96.9 FM in McLain, Mississippi), and WESV (96.5 FM in Richton, Mississippi). However, TraLyn Broadcasting's tenure as owner of these stations was financially unstable, and a coalition of creditors and former owners filed suit against the company.

As the result of the December 2005 settlement of a lawsuit by Community Broadcasting, Inc., and other parties against TraLyn Broadcasting, Inc., and related parties, TraLyn Broadcasting, et al., agreed to pay $245,000 in cash to Community Broadcasting, et al., and convey the assets and broadcast licenses of both WIGG and WXAB. The FCC approved this transfer on April 26, 2006, and the transaction was formally consummated on May 24, 2006.

The station fell silent for the final time on February 2, 2010. In its February 4, 2010 filing with the FCC, the station's owner stated that WIGG has gone off the air "due to the illness of its principal manager, A.R. Byrd", noting that he was "unable to attend to the necessary station duties." In late February, citing the manager's ongoing medical issues, the station applied for special temporary authority to remain silent. The FCC granted this authority on April 10, 2010, with a scheduled expiration of October 13, 2010. The Commission cautioned the station that if it did not resume broadcasting by 12:01 a.m. on February 3, 2011, that its broadcast license was subject to automatic forfeiture and cancellation.

In July 2011, the FCC determined that the station had not resumed broadcasting and that its license was deemed automatically expired on February 3, 2011. The "WIGG" call sign was deleted from the FCC database on July 18, 2011.
