= WFFF (AM) =

- Columbia, Mississippi; United States
- Frequency: 1360 kHz
- Branding: WFFF Radio

Programming
- Format: Classic hits
- Affiliations: Westwood One, USA Radio Network

Ownership
- Owner: Haddox Enterprises, Inc.

History
- First air date: 1961
- Last air date: March 31, 2026

Technical information
- Licensing authority: FCC
- Facility ID: 25816
- Class: D
- Power: 1,000 watts day; 159 watts night
- Transmitter coordinates: 31°15′44.6″N 89°50′41.3″W
- Translator: 93.9 W230CS (Columbia)

Links
- Public license information: Public file; LMS
- Website: www.wfffam.com

WFFF (1360 AM) was a Mississippi radio station broadcasting a classic hits format. Licensed to Columbia, Mississippi, United States, the station was owned by Haddox Enterprises, Inc. and featured programming from Westwood One and USA Radio Network. Its programming was heard on translator station W230CS (93.9 FM).

WFFF was first licensed on July 21, 1961. An FM sister station, WFFF-FM 96.7, was sold to the Educational Media Foundation in 2024. WFFF closed down March 31, 2026, and surrendered its license to the Federal Communications Commission. The license was cancelled on March 30.
