= WOWL =

- Burnsville, Mississippi; United States
- Frequency: 91.9 MHz
- Branding: Fun 91

Programming
- Format: Classic rock, adult contemporary

Ownership
- Owner: Southern Community Services, Inc.
- Sister stations: WADI

History
- First air date: 1999

Technical information
- Licensing authority: FCC
- Facility ID: 79355
- Class: C2
- ERP: 18,000 watts
- HAAT: 167 meters (548 feet)
- Transmitter coordinates: 34°55′47″N 88°24′37″W

Links
- Public license information: Public file; LMS
- Website: www.fun91.net

WOWL (91.9 FM) is a radio station licensed to the community of Burnsville, Mississippi, and serving the greater Northeast Mississippi, area. The station is owned by Southern Community Services, Inc. with studios located in Iuka, Mississippi. It airs an adult contemporary music format. 91.9 MHz is assigned to non-commercial stations in the United States, and WOWL follows FCC guidelines for program underwriting.

The station was assigned the WOWL call letters by the Federal Communications Commission on October 12, 1999. Until 1999, this had been the long-time callsign for television station WHDF in Florence, Alabama.

On November 25, 2022, WOWL added some Christian programming.

== Translators ==
Broadcast translators for WOWL
Call sign	Frequency	City of license	FID	ERP (W)	Class	FCC info
W225AB	(92.9 FM) FM	Florence, Alabama	55480	80	D	LMS
W272CE	(102.3 FM) FM	Killen, Alabama	72700	55	D	LMS
