= WJNS (AM) =

Radio station in Yazoo City, Mississippi (1974–1966)

- Yazoo City, Mississippi; United States
- Frequency: 1530 kHz

Programming
- Format: Defunct

Ownership
- Sister stations: WJNS-FM

History
- First air date: April 19, 1974
- Last air date: March 6, 1986
- Call sign meaning: Joel Netherland Shirley (name of owner and his wife)

Technical information
- Facility ID: 23334
- Class: D
- Power: 250 Watts (daytime only)

WJNS (1530 kHz) was a radio station licensed to Yazoo City, Mississippi. It operated during daytime hours only, and ran 250 watts.

== History ==
The station began broadcasting April 19, 1974, and originally held the call sign WYAZ. WYAZ's studio was located in a house trailer in a cornfield one mile north of Yazoo City. The station was owned by Gateway Broadcasting, with State Representative Joel Netherland owning controlling interest. In 1981, the station was sold to Chicago evangelist James Baker, and its call sign was changed to WPJJ. It was repurchased by Gateway Broadcasting in 1983, and its call sign was changed to WJNS. The purchase made the AM a sister to WJNS-FM, which had been on the air since 1968. Its license was cancelled March 6, 1986.
