= WMJW =

- Rosedale, Mississippi; United States
- Broadcast area: Clarksdale, Mississippi
- Frequency: 107.5 MHz
- Branding: Majic 107.5

Programming
- Format: Country
- Affiliations: AP News; Premiere Networks; Westwood One

Ownership
- Owner: Radio Cleveland
- Sister stations: WAID, WCLD, WCLD-FM, WKDJ-FM

History
- First air date: 1989, 1993 (as WMJW)
- Former call signs: WZRI (1989–1991, CP)
- Call sign meaning: "Majic"

Technical information
- Licensing authority: FCC
- Facility ID: 9025
- Class: C3
- ERP: 25,000 watts
- HAAT: 100 meters (330 ft)

Links
- Public license information: Public file; LMS
- Webcast: Listen Live
- Website: WMJW Online

WMJW (107.5 FM) is a radio station licensed to the city of Rosedale, Mississippi; it has a country music format known as "Majic 107.5" and is owned by Radio Cleveland located in Cleveland, Mississippi.
