= WZLQ =

Coordinates: 34.168°N 89.156°W

- Tupelo, Mississippi; United States
- Broadcast area: Tupelo, Mississippi
- Frequency: 98.5 MHz
- Branding: Z-98.5

Programming
- Format: Mainstream rock

Ownership
- Owner: Mississippi Radio Group
- Sister stations: WELO, WSYE, WWMS

History
- First air date: 1968 (as WELO-FM)
- Former call signs: WELO-FM (1968–1981)

Technical information
- Facility ID: 58828
- Class: C1
- ERP: 100,000 watts
- HAAT: 299 meters (981 ft)

Links
- Webcast: Listen Live
- Website: www.z985.net

WZLQ (98.5 FM), known as "Z-98.5", is a mainstream rock radio station based in Tupelo, Mississippi, and serves North Mississippi with ERP of 100,000 watts at 98.5 MHz. "Z-98-5" is owned by the Mississippi Radio Group. The station is the former WELO-FM, and was formerly known as "Z-99" in the 1980s. During the decade, it aired an adult contemporary format.
