= WSYE =

Coordinates: 33.752°N 88.878°W

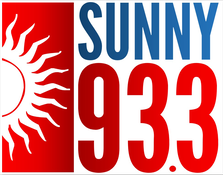
- Houston, Mississippi; United States
- Broadcast area: Houston/Columbus/Tupelo, Mississippi
- Frequency: 93.3 MHz
- Branding: Sunny 93.3

Programming
- Format: Adult contemporary

Ownership
- Owner: Mississippi Radio Group
- Sister stations: WELO, WWMS, WZLQ

History
- First air date: 1968 (as WCPC-FM)
- Former call signs: WCPC-FM (1966–1990)
- Call sign meaning: W SunnY E

Technical information
- Licensing authority: FCC
- Facility ID: 48630
- Class: C
- ERP: 100,000 watts
- HAAT: 550 meters (1,800 ft)

Links
- Public license information: Public file; LMS
- Webcast: Listen Live
- Website: sunny933fm.com

WSYE (93.3 FM), known as "Sunny 93.3", is a "Bright" adult contemporary radio station with studios in Tupelo, Mississippi. The station's city of license is Houston, Mississippi.

WSYE is one of only three 100,000-watt radio stations based in and serving North Mississippi and is owned and operated by the Mississippi Radio Group (which owns the only other two 100 kW stations in Northern Mississippi). Sunny 93.3's signal coverage is the largest of any other station in the region which enables the brand to serve two Arbitron rated markets: Tupelo and Columbus-Starkville-West Point.

The station is the former WCPC-FM. The first broadcast was in October 1990.
