= WBIP =

Coordinates: 34°38′21″N 88°34′33″W

Simulcasting WADI Corinth
- Booneville, Mississippi; United States
- Frequency: 1400 kHz
- Branding: The Bee 95.3 99.7 FM/1400 AM

Programming
- Format: Country

Ownership
- Owner: The Eagle Radio Group, Inc.; (Community Broadcasting Services of Mississippi, Inc.)

History
- First air date: September 1, 1950

Technical information
- Licensing authority: FCC
- Facility ID: 71213
- Class: C
- Power: 1,000 watts
- Translator: 99.7 W259CP (Booneville)

Links
- Public license information: Public file; LMS
- Webcast: Listen live
- Website: 953thebee.com

WBIP (1400 AM) is a radio station licensed to Booneville, Mississippi, United States. The station airs a country music format (simulcasting WADI 95.3 FM Corinth) and is owned by Community Broadcasting Services of Mississippi, Inc.

== History ==
WBIP began broadcasting on September 1, 1950. It aired block programming and was owned by E. O. Roden. Elvis Presley was interviewed on the station in February 1955.

A country music format was aired in the 1970s and 1980s. By 1993, southern gospel programming was added. In 1995, the station was sold to Community Broadcasting Services of Mississippi, along with 99.3 WBIP-FM, for $400,000. It became a Real Country affiliate later that year. In 1997, the station adopted a sports talk format. By 2003, the station had adopted a classic country format. The station also aired southern gospel block programming, which would eventually become its primary format. By 2019, the station had adopted a Christian contemporary format.

On November 25, 2022, WBIP flipped to a simulcast of country-formatted WADI 95.3 FM Corinth.

== Translator ==
WBIP is also heard on 99.7 MHz, through a translator in Booneville, Mississippi.

Broadcast translator for WBIP
Call sign	Frequency	City of license	FID	ERP (W)	HAAT	FCC info
W259CP	99.7 FM	Booneville, Mississippi	152557	250	88 m (289 ft)	LMS
