= WQNZ =

- Natchez, Mississippi; United States
- Broadcast area: Natchez micropolitan area
- Frequency: 95.1 MHz
- Branding: 95 Country

Programming
- Language: English
- Format: Country

Ownership
- Owner: Listen Up Yall Media; (First Natchez Radio Group Inc)
- Sister stations: KZKR, WKSO, WNAT, WWUU

History
- First air date: 1968
- Former call signs: WLIN

Technical information
- Licensing authority: FCC
- Facility ID: 21606
- Class: C1
- ERP: 100,000 watts
- HAAT: 219 meters (719 ft)
- Transmitter coordinates: 31°30′33.4″N 91°24′20.3″W

Links
- Public license information: Public file; LMS
- Webcast: Listen live
- Website: listenupyall.com/95-country

WQNZ (95.1 FM, "95 Country") is a radio station licensed to Natchez, Mississippi, United States. The station is broadcasting a country music format. WQNZ serves the Natchez micropolitan area. The station is owned by Listen Up Yall Media.

95 Country is the only 100.000 Watt station in the region and it reaches 35 counties and parishes in Southwest Mississippi and East Central Louisiana. By designation of the FCC, 95 Country is the regions primary news, weather and emergency source.

Its transmitter is located on 26 Colonel John Pitchford Parkway on the WNTZ-TV tower. WQNZ 95.1 and WKSO 97.3 also use the tower to broadcast their signal.

Former logo
