= WETX =

Vardaman, Mississippi; United States
- Frequency: 99.5 Megahertz
- Branding: Blazin' 99.5

Programming
- Format: Defunct (was Classic hip hop)

Ownership
- Owner: Eternity Records Company, LLC

Technical information
- Licensing authority: FCC
- Facility ID: 191532
- Class: A
- ERP: 1.8 kilowatts
- HAAT: 122 meters (400 ft)
- Transmitter coordinates: 33°49′10″N 89°16′0″W

Links
- Public license information: Public file; LMS

WETX was an FM radio station broadcasting on a frequency of 99.5 MHz and licensed to the city of Vardaman, Mississippi. The music format was known as Blazin' 99.5.

WETX was last owned by Eternity Records Company, LLC.

The Federal Communications Commission cancelled WETX's license on October 18, 2021.
