= WQBC =

AM radio station in Vicksburg, Mississippi (1927–2020)

Vicksburg, Mississippi; United States
- Broadcast area: Jackson, Mississippi Metropolitan Area
- Frequency: 1420 kHz

Ownership
- Owner: Michael M. Davis; (Costar Broadcast Group Inc.)

History
- First air date: February 18, 1928
- Last air date: January 12, 2019
- Call sign meaning: "We Quote Better Cotton"

Technical information
- Facility ID: 60000
- Class: B
- Power: 1,000 watts day 500 watts night
- Transmitter coordinates: 32°19′56.5″N 90°51′0.4″W

WQBC was an AM broadcasting station licensed on 1420 kHz at Vicksburg, Mississippi, United States. It was licensed on October 24, 1927, and made the claim of being the oldest operating radio station in Mississippi and one of the few remaining stations that still had their original call signs. Its license was surrendered on September 28, 2020, after having been off the air since January 12, 2019.

Well-known alumni of WQBC include bluesman extraordinaire Willie Dixon, and his Jubilee Singers, Adrian Cronauer, the inspiration for Good Morning, Vietnam, and Woodie Assaf, the longest-serving weatherman in the United States, who began his broadcasting career at WQBC in the 1940s before moving to 620 WJDX (AM) in Jackson, Mississippi and working at its sister station, WLBT TV 3 from its sign-on in December 1953.

== History ==
WQBC was first licensed on October 24, 1927 in Utica, Mississippi to I. R. Jones, who built and first operated the station. The call letters were randomly assigned from a sequential roster of available call signs. In 1930 the station was purchased by Delta Broadcasting (W.B Ford and E.M. Pace) and moved to Vicksburg. In 1931, it was bought by the Cashman family, owners of the Vicksburg Evening Post. When Federal Communications Commission (FCC) rules in 1975 banned cross ownership of newspapers and broadcast stations in the same area, WQBC was sold to Frank Hollifield, then to Elizabeth Owens. Bill Stanford bought the station in 1987. The station was later owned by Michael Corley.

WQBC was last owned by Costar Broadcast Group, a Chicago, Illinois, multi-media communications firm. The company's president was Michael M. Davis, a nativeof Lorman, Mississippi - the site of Alcorn State University, the first African-American land grant institution in the United States.

WQBC lost the lease on its tower site and went silent on March 12, 2010, while the sale to Michael M. Davis was pending. It received an extension to remain silent on November 18, 2010, pending studies for a new construction permit.

On January 12, 2019, WQBC went silent. Its license was surrendered on September 28, 2020, and cancelled by the FCC on September 29, 2020.
