= WNBN =

Radio station in Meridian, Mississippi (1987–2018)

Coordinates: 32°21′42″N 88°37′26″W

Meridian, Mississippi; United States
- Broadcast area: Meridian, Mississippi
- Frequency: 1290 kHz

Programming
- Format: Defunct (formerly Urban talk)

Ownership
- Owner: Frank Rackley, Jr.

History
- First air date: 1987

Technical information
- Facility ID: 22294
- Class: D
- Power: 2,500 watts day 91 watts night

WNBN (1290 AM) was a radio station broadcasting in the Meridian, Mississippi, Arbitron market. The station's license was deleted on June 20, 2018.
