= WZLD =

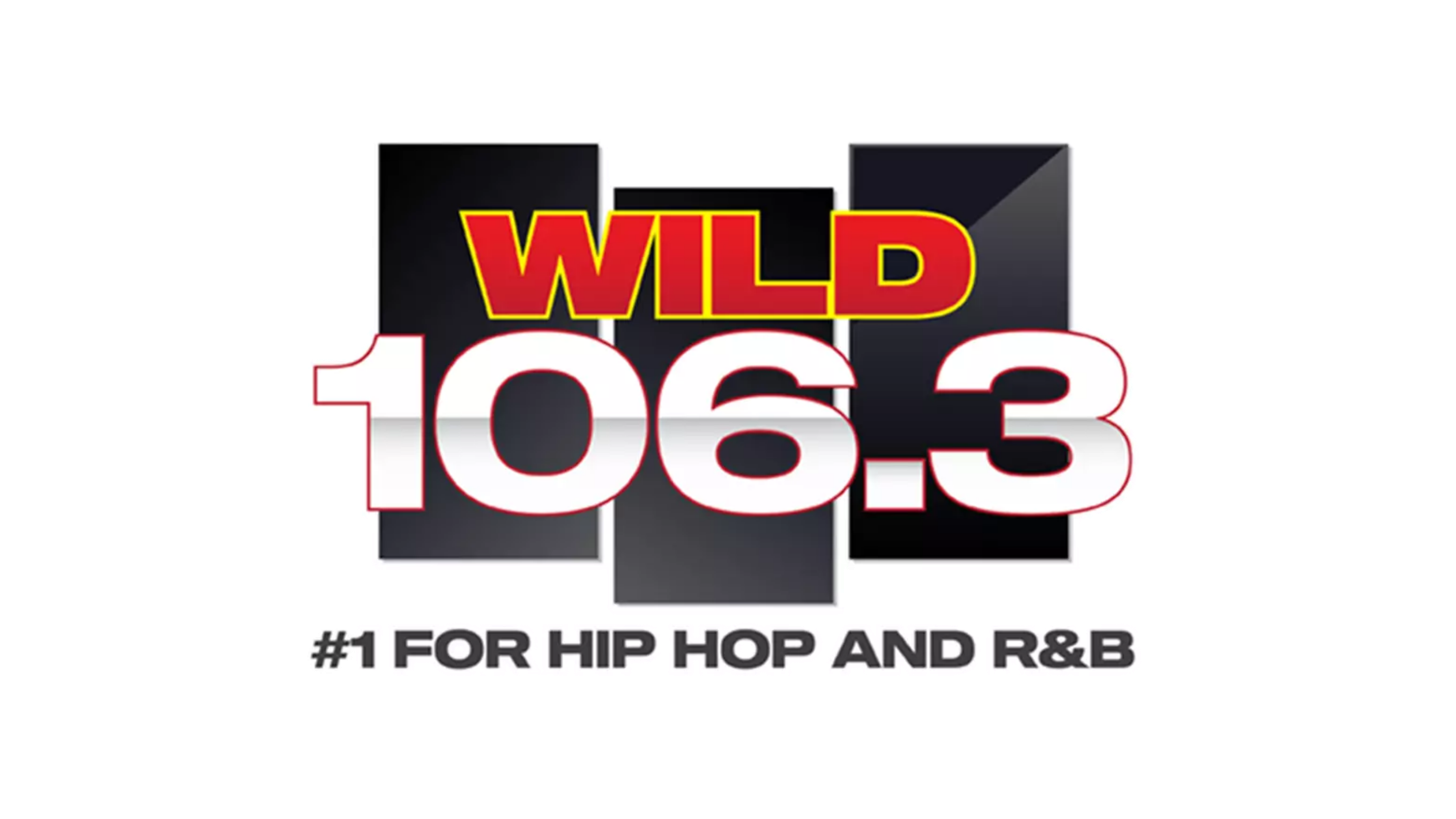
- Petal, Mississippi; United States
- Broadcast area: Hattiesburg-Laurel
- Frequency: 106.3 MHz
- Branding: Wild 106.3

Programming
- Language: English
- Format: Mainstream urban
- Affiliations: Premiere Networks

Ownership
- Owner: iHeartMedia, Inc.; (iHM Licenses, LLC)
- Sister stations: WJKX; WNSL

History
- First air date: January 1986
- Former call signs: WMFM (1985–2001)
- Call sign meaning: "Wild"

Technical information
- Licensing authority: FCC
- Facility ID: 66954
- Class: C2
- ERP: 10,500 watts
- HAAT: 324 meters (1,063 ft)
- Transmitter coordinates: 31°31′37.60″N 89°08′07.20″W

Links
- Public license information: Public file; LMS
- Webcast: Listen live (via iHeartRadio)
- Website: wild1063.iheart.com

WZLD (106.3 FM, "Wild 106.3") is a mainstream urban music formatted commercial radio station licensed to Petal, Mississippi, United States, serving the Hattiesburg-Laurel area. The station is owned by iHeartMedia and the license is held by iHM Licenses, LLC. WZLD is a maximized Class C2 station and has had the same format since March 2001. The studios are located with other sister stations on U.S. Highway 98 in West Hattiesburg.

Previous logo
