= WWMS =

Coordinates: 34.168°N 89.156°W

- Oxford, Mississippi; United States
- Broadcast area: Tupelo and North Mississippi
- Frequency: 97.5 MHz
- Branding: Miss 98

Programming
- Format: Country

Ownership
- Owner: Mississippi Radio Group
- Sister stations: WELO, WSYE, WZLQ

History
- First air date: 1968
- Former call signs: WOOR (1968–1985)
- Call sign meaning: MS is the USPS abbreviation for Mississippi

Technical information
- Licensing authority: FCC
- Facility ID: 58932
- Class: C1
- ERP: 100,000 watts
- HAAT: 299 meters (981 ft)

Links
- Public license information: Public file; LMS
- Website: miss98.net

WWMS (97.5 FM, "Miss 98") is a country music formatted radio station based in Oxford, Mississippi, which serves Tupelo and North Mississippi with an ERP of 100,000 watts at 97.5 MHz. WWMS is owned by Mississippi Radio Group. WWMS's studios and offices are located at 2214 South Gloster Street in Tupelo, Mississippi.

== Programming ==
WWMS was North Mississippi's only full-power FM country station having increased its power to the maximum allowed in July 1985. Its signal can be heard from Memphis, Tennessee, to Columbus, Mississippi; and from the Mississippi Delta to western Alabama. The parent company of WWMS also operates stations WSYE and WZLQ, which are also 100,000-watt FM stations based in Tupelo, Mississippi. The Mississippi Radio Group is a privately held company.

Miss 98 programs include Scott Spencer in the Morning, The Big Time with Whitney Allen, the Crook and Chase Countdown and The Road to Nashville.
