= WBYP =

- Belzoni, Mississippi; United States
- Frequency: 107.1 MHz

Programming
- Format: Country

Ownership
- Owner: Zoo-Bel Broadcasting, LLC
- Sister stations: WELZ

Technical information
- Licensing authority: FCC
- Facility ID: 28117
- Class: C3
- ERP: 9,400 watts
- HAAT: 162.0 meters (531.5 ft)
- Transmitter coordinates: 33°3′4″N 90°37′51″W

Links
- Public license information: Public file; LMS
- Website: www.power107radio.com

WBYP (107.1 FM) is a radio station broadcasting a country music format. Licensed to Belzoni, Mississippi, United States. The station is currently owned by Zoo-Bel Broadcasting, LLC.
