= WAGR-FM =

- Lexington, Mississippi; United States
- Frequency: 102.5 MHz

Programming
- Format: Urban Oldies

Ownership
- Owner: Holmes County Broadcasting Company, LLC
- Sister stations: WXTN

Technical information
- Licensing authority: FCC
- Facility ID: 21155
- Class: A
- ERP: 6,000 watts
- HAAT: 100 meters (330 ft)
- Transmitter coordinates: 33°09′00″N 90°07′45″W

Links
- Public license information: Public file; LMS
- Website: wagrfm1025.com

WAGR-FM (102.5 FM) is an American radio station broadcasting an urban oldies music format. Licensed to Lexington, Mississippi, United States, it serves the Lexington area. Former owner Brad Cothran died in a one-car accident on May 30, 2009, and the license was assigned to Holmes County Broadcasting Company, LLC effective June 29, 2012.
