= WSEL-FM =

WSEL-FM and WOCJ
- Pontotoc, Mississippi; United States
- Broadcast area: Tupelo
- Frequency: 96.7 MHz
- Branding: Inspiration 97

Programming
- Format: Christian radio

Ownership
- Owner: Ollie Collins, Jr.

Technical information
- Licensing authority: FCC
- Facility ID: 50287
- Class: A
- ERP: 3,000 watts
- HAAT: 91.0 meters
- Transmitter coordinates: 34°15′10″N 88°57′36″W

Links
- Public license information: and WOCJ Public file; LMS
- Website: http://www.wselradio.com/

WSEL-FM (96.7 FM) is a radio station broadcasting a Christian radio format. Licensed to Pontotoc, Mississippi, United States, the station serves the Tupelo area. The station is currently owned by Ollie Collins Jr.
