= WTYL-FM =

- Tylertown, Mississippi; United States
- Frequency: 97.7 MHz

Programming
- Format: Country

Ownership
- Owner: Tylertown Broadcasting Co.

Technical information
- Licensing authority: FCC
- Facility ID: 68658
- Class: A
- ERP: 3,000 watts
- HAAT: 44.0 meters (144.4 ft)
- Transmitter coordinates: 31°7′50″N 90°8′13″W

Links
- Public license information: Public file; LMS

WTYL-FM (97.7 FM) is a radio station broadcasting a country music format. Licensed to Tylertown, Mississippi, United States. The station is currently owned by Tylertown Broadcasting Co.
