= WRBE-FM =

- Lucedale, Mississippi; United States
- Frequency: 106.9 MHz
- Branding: WRBE FM 106.9

Programming
- Format: Country

Ownership
- Owner: JDL Corporation

Technical information
- Licensing authority: FCC
- Facility ID: 1063
- Class: A
- ERP: 6,000 watts
- HAAT: 79 meters (259 ft)
- Transmitter coordinates: 30°55′58″N 88°36′21″W

Links
- Public license information: Public file; LMS
- Webcast: Listen live
- Website: wrberadio.com

WRBE-FM (106.9 FM) is a radio station licensed to Lucedale, Mississippi, United States. The station is owned by JDL Corporation, and airs a country music format.

The station was assigned the WRBE-FM call letters by the Federal Communications Commission on October 17, 1990.
