= WVGG =

WVGG and WRBE-FM
Lucedale, Mississippi; United States
- Frequencies: WVGG: 1440 kHz; WRBE-FM: 106.9 MHz
- Branding: WRBE FM 106.9

Programming
- Format: Country and southern gospel

Ownership
- Owner: JDL Corporation
- Sister stations: WPMO

History
- First air date: WVGG: 1960

Technical information
- Licensing authority: FCC
- Facility ID: WVGG: 1060; WRBE-FM: 1063
- Class: WVGG: D; WRBE-FM: A
- Power: WVGG: 5,000 watts (days only)
- ERP: WRBE-FM: 6,000 watts
- HAAT: WRBE-FM: 79 meters (259 ft)
- Transmitter coordinates: WVGG: 30°55′58″N 88°36′21″W; WRBE-FM: 30°55′58.6″N 88°36′21″W

Links
- Public license information: WVGG: Public file; LMS; WRBE-FM: Public file; LMS
- Webcast: Listen live
- Website: www.wrberadio.com

WVGG (1440 AM) is a radio station licensed to Lucedale, Mississippi, United States. The station airs a country music/Southern gospel format (simulcasting WRBE-FM 106.9 Lucedale) and is owned by JDL Corporation.
