= WKSO (FM) =

- Natchez, Mississippi; United States
- Broadcast area: Natchez micropolitan area
- Frequency: 97.3 MHz
- Branding: Kiss 97.3

Programming
- Language: English
- Format: Contemporary hit radio

Ownership
- Owner: Listen Up Yall Media; (Will Perk Broadcasting)
- Sister stations: KZKR, WNAT, WQNZ, WWUU

History
- First air date: August 27, 1993
- Call sign meaning: Kiss

Technical information
- Licensing authority: FCC
- Facility ID: 29955
- Class: A
- ERP: 1,450 watts
- HAAT: 209 meters (686 ft)
- Transmitter coordinates: 31°30′33.4″N 91°24′20.3″W

Links
- Public license information: Public file; LMS
- Webcast: Listen live
- Website: WKSO Online

WKSO (97.3 MHz, "Kiss 97.3") is an American radio station licensed to Natchez, Mississippi. The station is broadcasting a Top 40 (CHR) format. WKSO serves the Natchez micropolitan area. The station is owned by Listen Up Yall Media. The station was originally urban WNJJ-FM 97.3 JAMZ until flipping to Hot AC as KISS 97.3 with call letters WKSO-FM in 2003. In 2006, Kiss 97.3 has shifted to Top 40.

Its transmitter is located in Natchez Mississippi on 26 Col John Pitchford Pkwy on the WNTZ-TV tower With WQNZ-FM

Former logo
