= WJKX =

Radio station in Ellisville–Hattiesburg, Mississippi

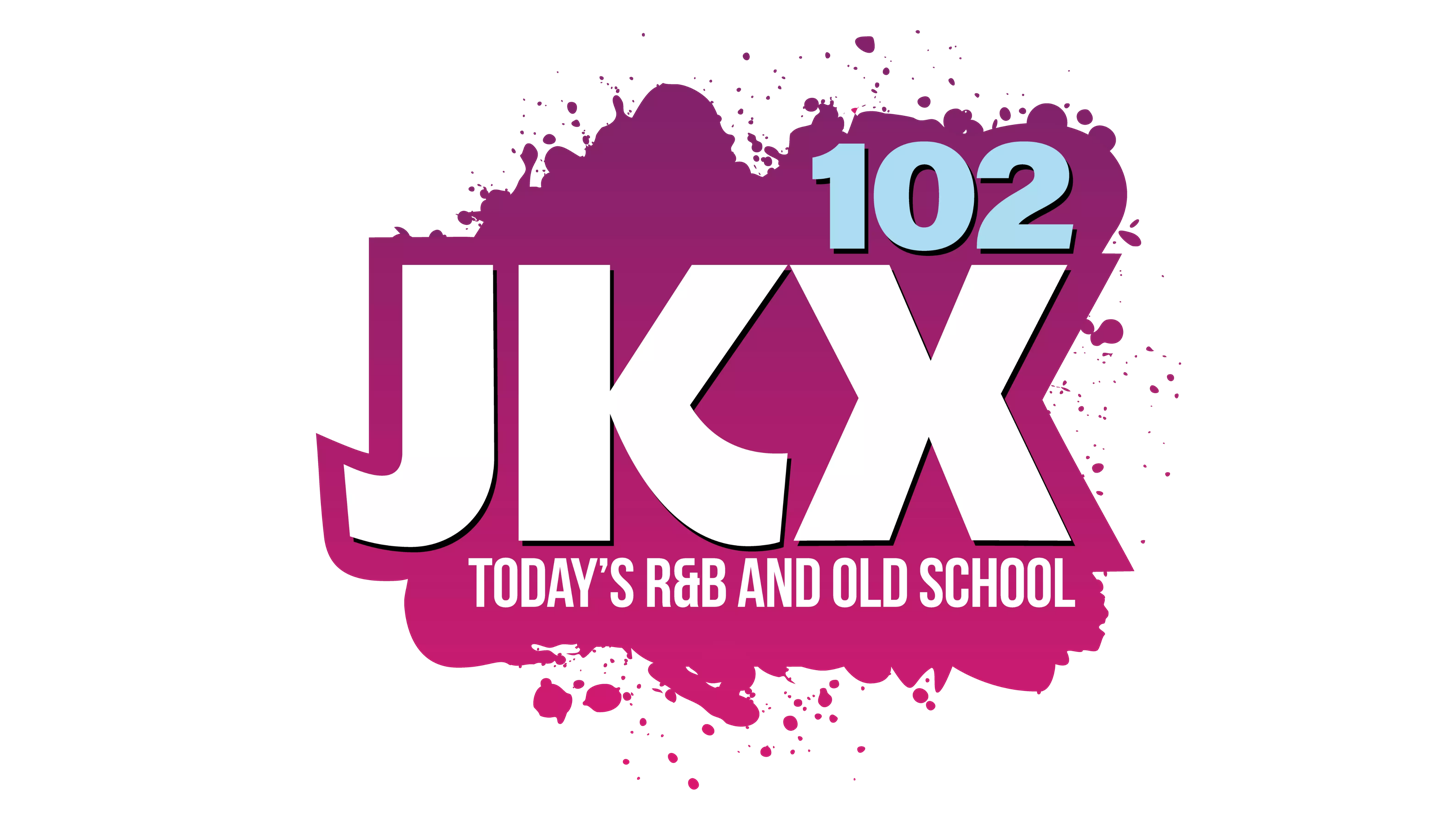
- Ellisville, Mississippi; United States
- Broadcast area: Laurel; Hattiesburg
- Frequency: 102.5 MHz
- Branding: 102 JKX

Programming
- Language: English
- Format: urban adult contemporary
- Affiliations: Premiere Networks

Ownership
- Owner: iHeartMedia, Inc.; (iHM Licenses, LLC)
- Sister stations: WNSL; WZLD

History
- First air date: 1973
- Former call signs: WBSJ (1973–1990)
- Former frequencies: 102.3 MHz (1973–1990)
- Call sign meaning: "Kix" (former country music format)

Technical information
- Licensing authority: FCC
- Facility ID: 61116
- Class: C2
- ERP: 11,500 watts
- HAAT: 256 meters (840 ft)
- Transmitter coordinates: 31°31′38.00″N 89°08′07.00″W

Links
- Public license information: Public file; LMS
- Webcast: Listen live (via iHeartRadio)
- Website: 102jkx.iheart.com

WJKX (102.5 FM, "102 JKX") is a commercial radio station licensed to Ellisville, Mississippi, United States, and serving the Laurel-Hattiesburg area. The station is owned by iHeartMedia, and airs an urban adult contemporary music radio format. The station's studios are located with other sister stations on U.S. Highway 98 in West Hattiesburg.

== History ==
The station signed on in 1973 as WBSJ, a country music station, located just north of Ellisville. WBSJ was owned by Glynn Holland and Herb Knotts, both of Ellisville, until 1989.
