= WAMY (AM) =

- Amory, Mississippi; United States
- Broadcast area: Amory, Mississippi; Monroe County, Mississippi
- Frequency: 1580 kHz
- Branding: "WAMY 96.5 & 1580"

Programming
- Format: Classic country

Ownership
- Owner: Stanford Communications, Inc.
- Sister stations: WAFM, WWZQ

History
- First air date: 1955
- Call sign meaning: W AMorY

Technical information
- Licensing authority: FCC
- Facility ID: 62223
- Class: D
- Power: 1,000 Watts daytime 18 Watts nighttime
- Transmitter coordinates: 33°58′33.0″N 88°29′29.0″W
- Translators: W243DZ (96.5 MHz, Amory)

Links
- Public license information: Public file; LMS
- Website: www.fm95radio.com/wamy-1580am-96-5fm

WAMY is a classic country radio formatted broadcast radio station licensed to Amory, Mississippi, serving Amory and Monroe County, Mississippi. WAMY is owned and operated by Stanford Communications, Inc.

== FM translator ==
An FM translator simulcasts the main station; the translator affords the listener the ability to listen on FM with its inherent high fidelity sound. The FM translator may also improve coverage, especially at night when the AM station broadcasts with only 18 watts.

Broadcast translator for WAMY
| Call sign | Frequency | City of license | FID | ERP (W) | FCC info |
|---|---|---|---|---|---|
| W243DZ | 96.5 FM | Amory, Mississippi | 201674 | 250 | LMS |
