= WVBG-FM =

Radio station in Redwood–Vicksburg, Mississippi

- Redwood, Mississippi; United States
- Broadcast area: Vicksburg, Mississippi
- Frequency: 105.5 MHz
- Branding: V 105.5

Programming
- Format: Classic hits
- Affiliations: Premiere Networks

Ownership
- Owner: Lendsi Radio, LLC
- Sister stations: WVBG

History
- First air date: October 27, 2005
- Call sign meaning: Vicksburg

Technical information
- Licensing authority: FCC
- Facility ID: 162298
- Class: A
- ERP: 2,600 watts
- HAAT: 154 meters (505 ft)
- Transmitter coordinates: 32°21′30.3″N 90°48′17.9″W

Links
- Public license information: Public file; LMS
- Webcast: Listen live
- Website: www.vicksburgradio.com

WVBG-FM (105.5 MHz, V 105.5) is a radio station licensed to Redwood, Mississippi, United States, broadcasting a classic hits music format. The station is currently owned by Lendsi Radio, LLC.
