= WVBG (AM) =

- Vicksburg, Mississippi; United States
- Frequency: 1490 kHz
- Branding: News Talk 1490

Programming
- Format: News–talk
- Affiliations: CBS News Radio; NBC News Radio; Compass Media Networks; Premiere Networks; USA Radio News; Westwood One

Ownership
- Owner: Owensville Communications, LLC
- Sister stations: WVBG-FM

History
- First air date: 1948 (as WJFL)
- Former call signs: WJFL (1948–1990); WOTA (1990–1993); WVIX (1993–1996); WRTM (1996–2006)
- Call sign meaning: Vicksburg

Technical information
- Licensing authority: FCC
- Facility ID: 31585
- Class: C
- Power: 1,000 watts
- Transmitter coordinates: 32°20′44.5″N 90°52′2.4″W
- Translator: 107.7 W299CC (Vicksburg)

Links
- Public license information: Public file; LMS
- Webcast: Listen live
- Website: www.newstalk1490.net

WVBG (1490 kHz) is an AM radio station broadcasting a news/talk format. Licensed to Vicksburg, Mississippi, United States. The station is currently owned by Owensville Communications, LLC.

Logo before translator sign on
