= WALT-FM =

Coordinates: 32.325°N 88.688°W

- Meridian, Mississippi; United States
- Frequency: 102.1 MHz
- Branding: Meridian's News Talk Leader

Programming
- Format: Talk radio
- Affiliations: Talk Radio Network

Ownership
- Owner: Bryan Holladay; (Meridian Media Group, LLC)
- Sister stations: WUCL, WKZB

History
- First air date: 1990
- Former call signs: WXHT (1990–1993); WTUX (1993–1998); WMMZ (1998–2006); WUCL (2006–2010)

Technical information
- Licensing authority: FCC
- Facility ID: 18229
- Class: A
- ERP: 920 watts
- HAAT: 155 meters (509 ft)

Links
- Public license information: Public file; LMS
- Website: WALT Website

WALT-FM (102.1 FM) is a radio station broadcasting in the Meridian, Mississippi, area. The station, owned by Bryan Holladay, through licensee Meridian Media Group, LLC, broadcasts a talk radio format.

WALT-FM is part of the Alert FM digital alert and messaging system for Lauderdale County first responders.

== History ==
On August 20, 2010, WUCL changed its format from country to talk (simulcasting WALT 910 AM) under new call sign WALT-FM.
