= WBKM (FM) =

- Bogue Chitto, Mississippi; United States
- Broadcast area: McComb-Brookhaven, Mississippi
- Frequency: 96.7 MHz
- Branding: K-Love

Programming
- Network: K-Love

Ownership
- Owner: Educational Media Foundation

History
- First air date: 1966
- Former call signs: WFFF-FM (1966–2024)

Technical information
- Licensing authority: FCC
- Facility ID: 25817
- Class: C3
- ERP: 14,500 watts
- HAAT: 131 meters (430 ft)
- Transmitter coordinates: 31°16′40″N 90°26′56″W

Links
- Public license information: Public file; LMS

WBKM (96.7 FM) is a radio station licensed to Bogue Chitto, Mississippi. The station serves as the McComb-area transmitter for the K-Love Christian radio network.

== History ==
The station, originally located in Columbia, Mississippi, was assigned the call sign WFFF-FM on November 7, 1966, and was first licensed on June 1, 1967.

Haddox Enterprises sold WFFF-FM to Educational Media Foundation for $250,000 in 2024, separating it from WFFF (1360 AM). The call sign was changed to WBKM on September 11, 2024.
