= WKOR (AM) =

Starkville, Mississippi; United States
- Frequency: 980 kHz

Ownership
- Owner: Volt Radio, LLC, as trustee
- Operator: Cumulus Media

History
- First air date: 1968
- Last air date: January 9, 2012
- Call sign meaning: "King of Rock"

Technical information
- Facility ID: 10348
- Class: D
- Power: 1,000 watts (days only)
- Transmitter coordinates: 33°28′44.4″N 88°44′40.2″W

WKOR (980 AM) was a commercial radio station licensed to Starkville, Mississippi, United States, that operated during the daytime hours only. The station was last owned by Volt Radio, LLC, a divestiture trust for Cumulus Media.

The station's broadcast license was surrendered to the Federal Communications Commission for cancellation by trustee Volt Radio, LLC on January 14, 2013.
