= WCMR-FM =

Bruce, Mississippi; United States
- Frequency: 94.5 MHz

Programming
- Format: Defunct

Ownership
- Owner: Horizon Christian Fellowship

History
- First air date: 1994
- Last air date: 2012
- Former call signs: WCMR (1994–2008)

Technical information
- Facility ID: 58037
- Class: A
- ERP: 5,100 watts
- HAAT: 109 meters (358 ft)
- Transmitter coordinates: 34°4′14.61″N 89°13′29.26″W

WCMR-FM (94.5 FM) was a radio station formerly licensed to Bruce, Mississippi, United States. The station was owned by Horizon Christian Fellowship.

== History ==
The station was assigned the call sign WCMR on February 22, 1994. On June 16, 2008, the station slightly changed its call sign to WCMR-FM. On May 4, 2012, the station surrendered its license to the Federal Communications Commission, and the station's license was cancelled and its call sign deleted from the FCC's database on May 24, 2012.
