= WCLD-FM =

- Cleveland, Mississippi; United States
- Broadcast area: Cleveland–Greenville–Greenwood
- Frequency: 103.9 MHz
- Branding: Jammin' 104

Programming
- Format: Urban contemporary
- Affiliations: AP News

Ownership
- Owner: Radio Cleveland, Inc.
- Sister stations: WAID, WCLD, WKDJ-FM, WMJW

History
- First air date: 1972
- Call sign meaning: Cleveland

Technical information
- Licensing authority: FCC
- Facility ID: 54532
- Class: C3
- ERP: 24,500 watts
- HAAT: 96 meters (315 ft)
- Transmitter coordinates: 33°44′1.40″N 90°42′50.30″W

Links
- Public license information: Public file; LMS
- Webcast: Listen live
- Website: rcidelta.com/jammin-104

WCLD-FM (103.9 MHz) is an urban contemporary formatted broadcast radio station. The station is licensed to Cleveland, Mississippi and serves Cleveland, Clarksdale, Greenville, Greenwood, and Indianola in Mississippi. WCLD-FM is owned by Radio Cleveland, Inc.
