= WHKL =

- Crenshaw, Mississippi; United States
- Frequency: 106.9 MHz
- Branding: 1069 Country Legends

Programming
- Format: Classic Country

Ownership
- Owner: J. Boyd Ingram and Carol B. Ingram
- Sister stations: WBLE-FM /WJBI-AM

History
- First air date: 1997

Technical information
- Licensing authority: FCC
- Facility ID: 77575
- Class: A
- ERP: 6,000 watts
- HAAT: 100 meters (330 ft)
- Transmitter coordinates: 34°26′51″N 90°6′25″W

Links
- Public license information: Public file; LMS
- Website: www.1069countrylegends.com

WHKL (106.9 FM, "1069 Country Legends") is a radio station broadcasting a Classic Country music format. Licensed to Crenshaw, Mississippi, United States, the station is currently owned by J. Boyd Ingram and Carol B. Ingram.
