= WQST (AM) =

- Forest, Mississippi; United States
- Broadcast area: Jackson, Mississippi
- Frequency: 850 kHz

Ownership
- Owner: Ace Broadcasting, Inc.

History
- Former call signs: WMAG, WJYV

Technical information
- Facility ID: 1652
- Class: D
- Power: 10,000 watts (days only)
- Transmitter coordinates: 32°21′46″N 89°25′9″W

WQST was a radio station licensed to serve Forest, Mississippi. The station is owned by Ace Broadcasting, Inc. Its format was southern gospel. The station was assigned this callsign by the Federal Communications Commission on September 1, 1986.

On Sunday, March 16, 2008, WQST dropped its simulcast with WZQK for southern gospel from The Gospel Station, based in Ada, Oklahoma.

In December 2012 WQST left the air due to financial reasons, and surrendered its license to the FCC on January 10, 2013. It was last used as an internet only radio station, gone by 2025.
