= WCLD (AM) =

- Cleveland, Mississippi; United States
- Broadcast area: Cleveland–Greenville–Greenwood
- Frequency: 1490 kHz
- Branding: Rejoice 1490 AM 96.5 FM

Programming
- Format: Gospel

Ownership
- Owner: Radio Cleveland, Inc.
- Sister stations: WAID, WCLD-FM, WKDJ-FM, WMJW

History
- First air date: 1949
- Call sign meaning: Cleveland

Technical information
- Licensing authority: FCC
- Facility ID: 54530
- Class: C
- Power: 1,000 watts (unlimited)
- Transmitter coordinates: 33°44′1.0″N 90°42′50.0″W

Links
- Public license information: Public file; LMS
- Webcast: Listen live
- Website: rcidelta.com/rejoice-1490am-96-5fm

WCLD (1490 kHz) is a gospel formatted broadcast radio station. The station is licensed to Cleveland, Mississippi, and serves Cleveland, Clarksdale, Greenville, Greenwood, and Indianola in Mississippi. WCLD is owned by Radio Cleveland, Inc.
