= WJNS-FM =

Radio station in Bentonia–Jackson, Mississippi

Coordinates: 32°33′25″N 90°20′14″W

- Bentonia, Mississippi; United States
- Broadcast area: Jackson metropolitan area
- Frequency: 92.1 MHz
- Branding: SonLife Radio

Programming
- Format: Christian radio
- Affiliations: SonLife Radio Network

Ownership
- Owner: Family Worship Center Church, Inc.

History
- First air date: December 13, 1968

Technical information
- Licensing authority: FCC
- Facility ID: 72816
- Class: A
- ERP: 4,800 watts
- HAAT: 111.3 meters (365 ft)

Links
- Public license information: Public file; LMS
- Webcast: Listen live
- Website: sonlifetv.com

WJNS-FM (92.1 MHz) is a Christian radio station licensed to Bentonia, Mississippi, and serving the Jackson metropolitan area. WJNS-FM is owned and operated by Family Worship Center Church, Inc.

== History ==
The station began broadcasting on December 13, 1968, and was originally licensed to Yazoo City, Mississippi. The station was owned by Gateway Broadcasting, with State Representative Joel Netherland owning controlling interest. The station primarily aired country music through the 1980s.

In 1988, the station was sold to St. Pe' Broadcasting for $312,500. St. Pe' was owned by Edward and Debbie St. Pe'. By the early 1990s, the station had adopted a contemporary hits format. In early 1991, the station switched to an oldies format, but in the summer of that year it returned to a country music format. In 1992, the station adopted a Gospel music format.

In 1993, the station was sold to Bishop Levi E. Willis's Willis Broadcasting. In 2004, the station was sold to Jimmy Swaggart's Family Worship Center for $350,000.

In 2007, the station was granted a construction permit to move from Yazoo City to Bentonia. WJNS-FM's tower was destroyed by Hurricane Ike on September 13, 2008, and was off the air for several months afterwards. In spring 2009, the station returned to the air from its new facilities in Bentonia.
