= WFOR (AM) =

Sports radio station in Hattiesburg, Mississippi

- Hattiesburg, Mississippi; United States
- Frequency: 1400 kHz
- Branding: The Score 92.7

Programming
- Language: English
- Format: Sports
- Affiliations: Fox Sports Radio

Ownership
- Owner: Heathcock Broadcasting Associates, LLC
- Sister stations: WMXI

History
- First air date: 1928
- Former call signs: WRBJ (1928–1931); WPFB (1931–1936)
- Call sign meaning: Forrest County

Technical information
- Licensing authority: FCC
- Facility ID: 54612
- Class: C
- Power: 1,000 watts
- Transmitter coordinates: 31°20′6.6″N 89°19′35.2″W
- Translator: 92.7 W224DP (Hattiesburg)

Links
- Public license information: Public file; LMS
- Webcast: Listen live
- Website: www.wmxi.com/score-fox-sports-radio/

WFOR (1400 AM, "The Score 92.7") is a commercial radio station licensed to Hattiesburg, Mississippi, United States. The station is owned by Heathcock Broadcasting Associates, LLC.

== Programming ==
WFOR broadcasts a sports radio format as an affiliate of the Fox Sports Radio network. Syndicated sports talk programming on WFOR includes The Dan Patrick Show. Local programming includes The Pine Belt Sports Drive and To The Top Talk with Jamie Arrington.

== History ==
WFOR's initial construction permit, with the sequentially assigned call letters WRBJ, was issued in March 1928 to the Woodruff Furniture Co. at 119 West Pine Street in Hattiesburg, Mississippi. In late 1931, the call letters were changed to WPFB, and in 1936 they became WFOR.

In October 1945, B. B McLemore joined WFOR as its chief engineer. The station's first high-powered 250-watt transmitter, hand built by McLemore, was at the time the most powerful in Southern Mississippi. The original studio was in an old two story building on Hemphill Street. In the early 1950, a new tower and an office location on West 7th Street were constructed. While constructing the current tower the top section came ajar, and a 30-foot (9.1-meter) section fell to the ground, leaving a worker dangling by rope on the tower in shock. Weeks passed but finally the new section was installed and proper guide tension wires attached. When the original transmitter was retired it was returned to McLemore, who maintained it as a keepsake for over 50 years.

In September 1998, Radio Hattiesburg, Inc. reached an agreement to sell WFOR to Cumulus Media as part of a multi-station deal valued at a combined $4.5 million. The deal was approved by the Federal Communications Commission (FCC) on December 18, 1998, and the transaction was consummated on April 2, 1999.

In October 2000, Cumulus Media announced an agreement to sell WFOR to Clear Channel Communications as part of a large station swap and sale, including seven Cumulus stations in the Laurel-Hattiesburg radio market. The deal was approved by the FCC on December 19, 2000, and the transaction was consummated on January 18, 2001.

A fire was noticed at the station's transmitter site at around 7:45 p.m. local time on December 15, 2015. Jackson Walter, senior vice predisent of programming for owner iHeartMedia, (Note: Clear Channel became iHeartMedia on September 16, 2014.) noted that there was no timetable for returning the station to the air and that the fire marshal said the building was a total loss.

On July 20, 2016, iHeartMedia announced that WFOR would be sold to Eagle Broadcasting, LLC for $120,000, and the transaction was consummated on October 5, 2016. The next day, "TheScore1400 WFOR-AM" was relaunched at 11:45 local time by the new owners. The FM translator signed on in 2018. Eagle Broadcasting sold WFOR and WMXI to Jamie Heathcock's Heathcock Communications for $500,000 in 2026.
