= WUCL (FM) =

Coordinates: 32.644°N 88.675°W

- De Kalb, Mississippi; United States
- Broadcast area: Meridian, Mississippi
- Frequency: 105.7 MHz
- Branding: 105.7 The Legend

Programming
- Format: Classic country

Ownership
- Owner: Bryan Holladay; (Meridian Media Group, LLC)
- Sister stations: WKZB, WALT-FM

History
- First air date: 1998
- Former call signs: WMLV (1998); WJXM (1998–2016)

Technical information
- Licensing authority: FCC
- Facility ID: 81878
- Class: C2
- ERP: 50,000 watts
- HAAT: 117 meters (384 ft)

Links
- Public license information: Public file; LMS
- Website: 1057thelegend.com

WUCL (105.7 MHz, "Classic Country 105.7") is a classic country FM radio station broadcasting in the Meridian, Mississippi area.

WUCL is part of the Alert FM digital alert and messaging system for Lauderdale County first responders.

== History ==
On October 28, 2016, the then-WJXM changed its format from urban contemporary (which moved to WKZB 95.1 FM Marion, MS) to classic country, branded as "Classic Country 105.7" (format moved from WUCL 97.9 FM Newton, MS). The station took on the WUCL call sign on November 8, 2016.
