= WKZB (FM) =

Coordinates: 32°21′57″N 88°54′50″W

- Newton, Mississippi; United States
- Broadcast area: Meridian, Mississippi
- Frequency: 97.9 MHz
- Branding: 97.9 The Buzz

Programming
- Format: Classic hits
- Affiliations: United Stations Radio Networks

Ownership
- Owner: Bryan Holladay; (Meridian Media Group, LLC)
- Sister stations: WUCL, WALT-FM

History
- Former call signs: WMYQ-FM (1980–1984); WNNW-FM (1984–1985); WMYQ-FM (1985–1999); WMSO (1999–2006); WYHL (2006–2007); WHTU (2007–2011); WUCL (2011–2016); WJXM (11/8/2016-11/16/2016)

Technical information
- Licensing authority: FCC
- Facility ID: 48780
- Class: C3
- ERP: 8,700 watts
- HAAT: 168 meters

Links
- Public license information: Public file; LMS

WKZB (97.9 MHz, "The Buzz") is a classic hits-formatted FM radio station licensed to Newton, Mississippi broadcasting in the Meridian, Mississippi, Arbitron market. Its transmitter is located near Chunky, Mississippi.

== History ==
On September 9, 2011, the then-WHTU changed its call sign to WUCL and changed format to classic country.

On October 28, 2016, WUCL changed its format from classic country (which moved to WJXM 105.7 FM DeKalb) to classic hits, branded as "97.9 The Buzz" as part of a three-station format shuffle. On November 8, 2016, the station assumed the WJXM call sign. On November 16, 2016, WJXM changed its call sign to WKZB.
