= List of urban-format radio stations in the United States =

The classification of urban-formatted radio stations range from the radio formats of rhythmic contemporary hit radio to Urban contemporary gospel. Though urban contemporary was the originator of the format, there have come to be many variations of the format in the last 30 years.

== Alabama ==
=== Birmingham ===
- WAGG – Heaven 610 WAGG – Urban contemporary gospel
- WATV – V-94.9 – Urban contemporary
- WJLD – AM 1400 WJLD – Urban oldies/Blues
- WBHJ – 95.7 Jamz – Rhythmic contemporary hit radio (Urban contemporary hit radio)
- WBHK – 98.7 Kiss FM – Urban adult contemporary
- WMJJ-HD2 – 104.1 The Beat – Mainstream urban
- WUHT – Hot 107.7 – Urban adult contemporary
- WERC-HD2 – Hallelujah 105.1 – Urban contemporary gospel
- WERC-HD3 – B106.5 – Urban adult contemporary
- WDXB-HD2/W224CK - Birmingham's BIN 92.7 - Black-oriented news

=== Mobile ===
- WGOK – Gospel 900 – Urban contemporary gospel
- WBLX-FM – 93BLX – Urban contemporary
- WDLT-FM – 104.1 WDLT – Urban adult contemporary
- WRGV - 107.3 The Beat - Mainstream urban
- WMXC-HD2 - 100.3 Hallelujah FM - Urban Gospel
- WASG - AM 540 - Urban gospel
- WERM - Gospel 1220 - Urban gospel

=== Huntsville ===
- WDJL – Gospel Explosions 1000 AM – Urban Gospel
- WEUP – Worship 94.5 – Urban contemporary gospel and urban adult contemporary
- WEUV – Worship 94.5 - simulcasts WEUP (AM) – Urban contemporary gospel and urban adult contemporary
- WHIY – AM 1600 Party Oldies & Blues – Urban Oldies, Blues
- WEUP-FM – 103.1 WEUP – Mainstream urban
- WEUZ – 92.1 simulcasts WEUP-FM – Mainstream urban
- WHRP – 94.1 WHRP – Urban adult contemporary
- WLOR/WAHR HD-2 - 98.1 The Beat - Urban Contemporary

=== Montgomery ===
- WXVI – Sonshine 16 – Urban contemporary gospel
- WHLW – Hallelujah 104.3 – Urban contemporary gospel
- WJWZ – 97.9 Jamz – Urban contemporary
- WKXN/WZKD – The Big KD – Urban adult contemporary
- WWMG – Magic 97.1 – Urban adult contemporary
- WZHT – Hot 105.7 – Mainstream urban
- WQKS-HD2 – Streamz 100 – Urban contemporary
- WMRK-HD2/W257DS - Montgomery's BIN 99.3 - Black-oriented news
- WMRK-HD3 - Praise 96.5 - Urban Gospel

=== Tuscaloosa ===
- WTSK – Praise 93.3 - Urban contemporary gospel
- WMXB – Mix 107.3 – Urban Adult Contemporary
- WWPG – Q104 – Urban oldies
- WTUG-FM – 92.9 WTUG – Urban adult contemporary
- WALJ – 105.1 The Block – Urban contemporary

=== Dothan ===
- WDSA – AM 1320 – Urban Talk
- WAGF-FM – 101.3 The Touch – Urban adult contemporary/Urban contemporary gospel
- WBBK-FM – Magic 93.1 – Urban adult contemporary
- WJJN – 92.1 Jamz – Urban contemporary
- WARB - V105.9 - Urban contemporary

=== Florence/Muscle Shoals ===
- WZZA - AM 1410 The Soul Of The Shoals - Urban Adult Contemporary, Blues
- WMXV-HD3 - 105.1 and 101.5 HD3 Music Muscle of the Shoals - Urban Contemporary

=== Selma ===
- WJAM - Jammin' 94.7 FM & 1340 AM - Urban Adult Contemporary
- WBFZ - Z-105.3 - Urban Contemporary/Urban Gospel
- WALX-HD3 - Praise 96.3 - Urban Gospel

=== Anniston/Oxford ===
- WFZX - 99.1 & 99.3 The Vibe - Urban contemporary
- WHOG - 93.5 The Hog - Urban adult contemporary

=== Pine Hill ===
- WKXK - The Big KD - Urban adult contemporary

=== Gadsden ===
- WMGJ - Magic 1240 AM - Urban contemporary

=== Demopolis ===
- WZNJ - 106.5 The River - Urban contemporary/Urban oldies

=== Livingston ===
- WYLS - Rejoice WYLS - Black gospel

=== Brantley ===
- WXKD - The Big KD - Urban adult contemporary

=== Russellville ===
- WKAX - WKAX 1500 AM - Urban Gospel

== Alaska ==
=== Anchorage ===
- KFAT – K-Fat 929 – Rhythmic contemporary hit radio/Hip-Hop

== Arizona ==
=== Phoenix ===
- KAJM – Mega 99.3 & 1580 – Rhythmic Adult Contemporary
- KKFR – Power 98.3 – Rhythmic Contemporary
- KZCE – 101.1 The Bounce – Classic Hip Hop
- KQMR - Latino Mix 100.3 - Spanish CHR
- KRDP - Radio Phoenix 90.7 - Urban Contemporary, Blues, Jazz, Community Radio
- KFUE - Fuego 106.7 - Bilingual Rhythmic Contemporary

=== Tucson ===
- KTGV – 106.3 The Groove – Rhythmic adult contemporary
- KOHT – Hot 98.3 – Urban contemporary
- KSZR - 97.5 The Vibe - Classic hip hop
- KMMA - Mega 97.1 - Spanish CHR
- KZLZ-HD2 - 92.5 Urbana - Spanish urban

== Arkansas ==
=== Little Rock ===
- KIPR/KFOG – Power 92 Jams – Urban contemporary
- KHTE-FM - 96.5 The Box - Urban contemporary
- KOKY – 102.1 KOKY – Urban adult contemporary
- KPZK – Praise 102.5 – Urban contemporary gospel
- KWCP-LP - KWCP-LP 98.9 The Mix - Urban Adult Contemporary/Classic Hip Hop
- KTUV - The Cat 99.9 FM & 1440 AM - Urban Oldies

=== Pine Bluff ===
- KPBA - 99.3 The Beat - Mainstream Urban
- KCAT – The Cat 92.7 FM & 1340 AM – Urban Oldies
- KUAP – Hot 89.7 – Urban Contemporary/College Radio

=== Texarkana ===
- KTOY – 104.7 KTOY – Urban adult contemporary
- KMJI – Majic 93.3 – Urban contemporary

=== Blytheville ===
- KAMJ – K Jam 93-9 – Mainstream urban

=== Fayetteville ===
- KQIS - Kiss 105.3/1340 - Mainstream Urban
- KDIV-LP - KDIV 98.7 - Urban Contemporary/Community Radio

=== El Dorado/Camden ===
- KMLK – "FM 98.7" – Urban contemporary
- KMGC – "Magic 104.5" – Urban adult contemporary

=== Jonesboro ===
- KDXY-HD2 - "Hot 107.5" - Rhythmic Top 40
- KLEK-LP - "KLEK 102.5 FM" - Urban contemporary

== California ==
=== Los Angeles ===
- KPWR – Power 106 – Rhythmic Hot AC
- KRRL – Real 92.3 – Urban contemporary
  - KRRL-HD2 - Black Information Network - Black-oriented news
- KTWV – 94.7 The Wave – Rhythmic Adult Contemporary
- KJLH – 102.3 KJLH – Urban adult contemporary
- KDAY – 93.5 KDAY – Classic hip hop
- KBLA - 1580 KBLA - Urban/Progressive Talk
- KXOL-FM - Mega 96.3 - Spanish CHR
- KLXM/KLXO - Latino Mix 103.9 y 98.3 - Spanish CHR

=== San Francisco/Oakland/San Jose ===
- KDYA – Gospel 1190 the Light – Urban contemporary gospel
- KBLX – 102.9 KBLX – Urban adult contemporary
  - KBLX HD-2 - Old School 102.9 HD-2 - Urban Oldies
  - KBLX HD-3 - Praise Bay Area - Urban Gospel
- KMEL – 106.1 KMEL – Urban contemporary
- KKSF - The Bay Area's BIN 910 - Black-oriented news
- KRBQ – 102.1 JAMS – Classic Hip Hop
- KVVF/KVVZ - Latino Mix 105.7/100.7 - Spanish CHR
- KPOO - 89.5 KPOO - Jazz, Blues, R&B, Variety

=== San Diego ===
- XHRM-FM – Magic 92.5 – Rhythmic AC
- KSSX - Jam'n 95.7 – Rhythmic contemporary
  - KSSX-HD2 - Black Information Network - Black-oriented news

=== Sacramento ===
- KDEE-LP – 97.5 – Urban adult contemporary/Community radio
- KHYL – V101 – Classic hip-hop
- KSFM – 102.5 KSFM – Urban contemporary
- KHHM - Fuego 101.9 - Bilingual Rhythmic CHR

=== Riverside/San Bernardino ===
- KDEY-FM – 93.5 KDAY – Classic hip hop
- KGGI – 99.1 KGGI – Rhythmic Top 40
- KQIE – Old School 104.7 – Rhythmic Oldies
- KFOO - Riverside's BIN 1440 - Black-oriented news

=== Bakersfield ===
- KKBB – Groove 99.3 – Rhythmic Oldies
- KISV – HOT 94.1 – Rhythmic Top 40
  - KISV-HD2 - 101.1 The Bounce - Classic hip hop
- KVPM - Precious 95.7 - Rhythmic Adult Contemporary
- KBDS - Fire 103.9 - Urban contemporary
- KBQF - Kalor 104.3 - Spanish rhythmic

=== Palmdale/Ridgecrest/High Desert ===
- KRAJ – 98.5 The Heat - Rhythmic Top 40

=== Stockton ===
- KWIN – 97.7 and 98.3 K-WIN – Urban contemporary
- KQOD – Mega 100.1 – Rhythmic oldies

=== Modesto ===
- KWNN – 97.7 and 98.3 K-WIN – Urban contemporary
- KHTN - Hot 104.7 - Rhythmic Top 40
- KCVR-FM - Fuego 98.9 - Bilingual Rhythmic CHR

=== Palm Springs ===
- KKUU – U-92.7 – Rhythmic contemporary
- KMRJ - Jammin 99.5 - Rhythmic AC
- KPST-FM - Fuego 103.5 - Bilingual Rhythmic CHR

=== Santa Barbara/Santa Maria/San Luis Obispo ===
- KRTO - Fuego 97.1 - Bilingual Rhythmic CHR
- KOSJ - Old School 94.1 & 1490 - Rhythmic oldies

=== Oxnard/Ventura County ===
- KCAQ – Q95.9 – Rhythmic Top 40
- KOCP - Old School 104.7 - Rhythmic Oldies
- KJBU-LP - 99.3 The Rhythm Of The Coast - Urban Contemporary/Community Radio

=== Monterey/Salinas ===
- KDON-FM – 102.5 K-Don – Rhythmic Top 40 (CHR)
- KOCN – K-Ocean 105.1 – Rhythmic/Urban oldies

=== Fresno ===
- KBOS-FM – B95 – Rhythmic contemporary
- KMGV – Mega 97.9 – Rhythmic Oldies
- KFBT – 103.7 The Beat – Rhythmic adult contemporary
- KSEQ – Q97.1 – Rhythmic Top 40
- KKBZ - Caliente 105.1 - Spanish urban
- KZLA - Old School 98.3 - Rhythmic Oldies

=== Victorville ===
- KATJ HD-2 - HD-96.3 - Rhythmic Contemporary/Hip Hop

=== Barstow ===
- KWIE - Old School 101.3 - Rhythmic oldies

=== Chico ===
- KZSZ-HD2 - 93.3 Urbana - Spanish rhythmic

=== Santa Rosa ===
- KSXY - Latino 100.9 - Spanish CHR

=== Porterville ===
- KTIP - Jam'n 101.3 - Rhythmic oldies

== Colorado ==
=== Denver ===
- KQKS – KS107.5 – Rhythmic Hot AC
- KUVO HD-2 - The Drop 104.7 & 89.3 HD-2 - Urban Contemporary/Urban alternative
- KFCO - Flo 107.1 - Christian Hip Hop

=== Colorado Springs ===
- KIBT – 96.1 The Beat – Rhythmic Top 40
  - KIBT HD-2 - Urban Oldies

=== Fort Collins ===
- KJMP - Jump 104.5 - Classic Hip Hop

== Connecticut ==
=== Hartford/New Haven ===
- WQTQ - Qute 89.9 - Urban Contemporary (Hartford)
- WYBC-FM – 94.3 WYBC – Urban adult contemporary (New Haven)
- WKCI-HD2 - 100.9 The Beat - Mainstream urban (New Haven)
- WZMX – Hot 93.7 – Rhythmic contemporary (Hartford/New Haven)
- WBOM - 102.5 Hartford's R&B Station - Urban Adult Contemporary (Meriden/Hartford)
- WMRQ-HD2 - Bomba FM - Spanish tropical (Hartford/Meriden)
- WRYM/WWCO/WCUM - Viva Radio - Latin pop/Tropical music/Reggaeton (Hartford/New Haven)

=== New London ===
- WWRX – Jammin' 107.7 Rhythmic contemporary hit radio
- WDUP-LP - 92.9 FM WDUP Timeless Hip Hop and R&B - Urban Adult Contemporary

=== Bloomfield ===
- WGZO-LP - Heartbeat 98.7 - Urban gospel

== Delaware ==
=== Wilmington ===
- WXHL-FM - Reach Gospel Radio 89.1 - Urban gospel
- WOCQ - Maxima 104.1 - Spanish CHR

== District of Columbia ==
=== Washington ===
- WOL – News Talk 1450 - Urban News/Talk
- WYCB – Spirit 1340 – Urban contemporary gospel
- WPRS-FM/W240DJ – Praise 92.7 & 95.9 – Urban contemporary gospel
- WHUR – 96.3 WHUR – Urban adult contemporary
- WKYS – 93.9 WKYS – Urban contemporary
- WMMJ – Majic 102.3 – Urban oldies-leaning urban adult contemporary
- WPGC-FM – WPGC 95.5 – Urban Contemporary
- WUST - DMV's BIN 1120 - Black-oriented news
- WLZL - El Zol 107.9 - Bilingual Rhythmic CHR

== Florida ==
=== Miami/Fort Lauderdale ===
- WMBM – 1490 - Urban contemporary gospel
- WMIB – 103.5 The Beat – Urban contemporary
  - WMIB HD-3 - PK's Throwback 105.5 - Classic Hip Hop
- WEDR – 99 Jamz – Urban contemporary
- WHQT – Hot 105 – Urban adult contemporary
- WXBN - Miami's BIN 880 - Black-oriented news
- WEXY - AM 1520 - Urban contemporary gospel/Brokered programming
- WPOW - POWER 96 - Rhythmic Adult Contemporary
- WZTU - Tu 94.9 - Spanish Top 40
- WRMA - Ritmo 95.7 - Cubatón
- WRTO-FM - Mix 98.3 - Spanish tropical
- WXDJ - El Zol 106.7 - Spanish CHR

=== Tampa Bay Area ===
- WBTP - 106.5 The Beat - Classic Hip Hop
- WLLD – Wild 94.1 – Rhythmic contemporary hit radio
- WTBV - 101.5 The Vibe - Urban Adult Contemporary
- WMNF HD-2 - The Urban Cafe 88.5 HD-2 - R&B, Neo-Soul, Classic Hip Hop, Variety

=== Jacksonville ===
- WZAZ – Gospel 1400 the Light – Urban contemporary gospel
- WJBT – 93.3 The Beat Jamz – Mainstream urban
  - WJBT HD-2 - Jacksonville's BIN 104.1 - Black-Oriented News
- WSOL-FM – V-101.5 – Urban Adult Contemporary
- WCGL – The Victory Station AM 1360 & 94.7 - Urban contemporary gospel
- WJGL-HD2 – Power 106.1 - Urban contemporary
- WHJX - Hot 106.5 - Urban Adult Contemporary
- WMUV HD-3 - Praise 107.9 - Urban contemporary gospel
- WJXR/WJNJ - Latina 92.1 & 103.7 - Spanish tropical
- WSOS-FM/WNNR - Kaliente 94.1 & 97.3 - Spanish tropical
- WQIK-HD2 - Rumba 106.9 - Spanish tropical

=== Orlando/Daytona Beach ===
- WOKB – WOKB 1680 AM – Urban contemporary gospel
- WCFB – Star 94.5 – Urban adult contemporary
- WTKS-HD2 – 104.5 The Beat – Mainstream urban
- WPOZ-HD3 - Hot 95.9 — Christian Hip Hop
- WHPB-LP - 98.5 The Wire - Urban Contemporary/Community Radio
- WHOG HD-2 - Hot 94.1 - Urban Contemporary (Daytona Beach)
- WRWS-LP - Urban contemporary
- WURB-LP - Urbana 92.7 - Spanish urban
- WRUM - Rumba 100.3 - Latin pop/Reggaeton/Tropical music
  - WRUM-HD2 - Mega 97.1 - Spanish CHR
- WPYO - El Zol 95.3 - Spanish tropical
- WFYY - Kaliente 103.1 - Spanish tropical
- WJHM - 102 Jamz - Classic hip hop
  - WJHM-HD3 - "G-Praise 106.3/93.3" — Urban contemporary gospel
- WONQ - 93.9/103.5 Party FM - Bilingual rhythmic hot AC

=== West Palm Beach ===
- WMBX – X102.3 – Urban Adult Contemporary
- WLLY HD-3 - Yo 107.1 - Rhythmic contemporary
- WZZR HD-2 - Jam'n 93.3 - Classic Hip Hop
- WRLX - Mia 94.3 - Spanish CHR

=== Fort Myers/Naples ===
- WZKO - 1350/107.5 Jamz - Urban Adult Contemporary
- WBTT – 105.5 the Beat – Rhythmic contemporary hit radio
- WFFY - Fly 98.5 - Rhythmic Contemporary/Hip-Hop
- WOKE-LP - 94.9 The City - Urban Contemporary
- WTLQ-FM - 97.7 Latino - Spanish CHR

=== Pensacola ===
- WRNE – Cool 93.7 & 980 – Urban adult contemporary
- WNVY – 1090AM the Light – Urban contemporary gospel
- WBLX-FM – 93BLX – Urban contemporary
- WRRX – Magic 106.1 – Urban adult contemporary
- WRGV - 107.3 The Beat - Mainstream urban
- WMEZ - Hot 94.1 - Rhythmic Contemporary

=== Tallahassee ===
- WSTT – AM 730 - Urban contemporary gospel
- WHBX – 96.1 Jamz – Urban adult contemporary
- WWLD – Blazin' 102.3 – Urban contemporary
- WANM - The Flava Station 90.5 - Urban Contemporary/College Radio
- WWLD HD-2 - Heaven 98.3 - Urban Gospel
- WGMY HD-2 - 105.3 The Beat - Mainstream urban
- WGMY HD-3 - Tallahassee's BIN 100.3 - Black-oriented news

=== Panama City ===
- WEBZ – 99.3 The Beat – Urban contemporary

=== Gainesville ===
- WTMG – Magic 101.3 – Rhythmic contemporary
- WAJD - 98.9 Jamz - Urban contemporary
- WDVH - R&B 94.1 - Urban oldies-leaning urban adult contemporary
- WKTK-HD2/WRBD/WMOP - Power 92.1 - Urban contemporary

=== Vero Beach/Fort Pierce ===
- WFLM - Q-91.1 - Urban Adult Contemporary

=== Cocoa Beach ===
- WRRJ - Reggae

=== Lakeland/Winter Haven ===
- WSIR - Family Radio 1490 - Urban Gospel

=== Lake City ===
- WUAF-LP - Angel 107.9 - Gospel

=== Sarasota ===
- WBTP - 106.5 The Beat - Classic Hip Hop

== Georgia ==
=== Atlanta ===
- WAOK – News/Talk 1380 WAOK - Urban News/Talk
- WPZE – Praise 102.5 – Urban Gospel
- WAMJ/WUMJ – Majic 107.5/97.5 – Urban Adult Contemporary
- WALR-FM – Kiss 104.1 – Urban Adult Contemporary
- WHTA – Hot 107.9 – Mainstream Urban
- WRDG - 96.1 The Beat - Urban contemporary
- W233BF WIPK WWSZ – Streetz 94.5 – Mainstream Urban
- WVEE – V-103 – Urban Contemporary
- W275BK – Classix 102.9 – Urban Oldies
- W255CJ – OG 98.9 – Classic Hip-Hop
- WBIN - Atlanta's BIN 640 - Black-oriented news
- WYKG - 105.5 FM/AM 1430 The King - Urban Oldies, Classic Hip-Hop
- WBZY - Z105.7 - Spanish CHR
- WXJO - My City 104.5 - Urban Gospel
- WIGO - Pacesetter 1570 AM - Urban adult contemporary

=== Augusta ===
- WEZO - 1230 The Blaze - Urban AC/Black Gospel
- WNRR - Gospel 1380 - Urban Gospel
- WTHN/WTHB-FM – Praise 96.9 & 1550 – Urban Gospel
- WKZK – The Spirit 103.7 FM & 1600 AM – Urban Gospel
- WAEG – Smooth Jazz 92.3 – Smooth jazz
- WKSP – 96.3 Kiss FM – Urban Adult Contemporary
- WIIZ – The Wiz 97.9 – Mainstream urban
- WAKB – Magic 100.9 – Urban Adult Contemporary
- WFXA-FM – Foxie 103 Jamz – Mainstream urban
- WKZK – Sonshine 103.7 – Urban Gospel
- WPRW – Power 107 – Mainstream urban
- WHHD-HD2 – HOT 97.7 – Classic Hip-Hop
- WYBO - 92.9 The Soul Mine - Rhythmic Oldies
- WYNF - Augusta's BIN 1340 - Black-oriented news

=== Savannah ===
- WSOK – 1230/99.7 WSOK – Urban Gospel
- WEAS-FM − E93 − Mainstream Urban
- WQBT – 94.1 The Beat – Mainstream Urban
- WLVH – Love 101.1 – Urban Adult Contemporary
- WTYB – Magic 103.9 – Urban Adult Contemporary
- WXYY - G100 - Rhythmic contemporary
- WNMR - Coast 99.3 - Urban contemporary

=== Columbus ===
- WOKS – WOKS AM1340 – Rhythmic oldies
- WAGH – Magic 101.3 – Urban adult contemporary
- WBFA – 98.3 the Beat – Mainstream urban
- WEAM-FM – Praise 100.7 – Urban contemporary gospel
- WFXE – Foxie 105 – Mainstream urban
- WKZJ – K-92.7 – Urban adult contemporary
- WKCN-HD2 – HIP HOP 106.5 – Classic hip-hop
- WTLM - Hallelujah 1520 AM - Urban contemporary gospel
- WHTY/W234BX - Columbus’ BIN 94.7/1460 - Black-oriented news
- WLTC - 103.7 Smooth FM - Urban adult contemporary

=== Macon ===
- WFXM – Power 107.1 – Mainstream urban
- WIBB-FM – 97.9 WIBB – Mainstream urban
- WLZN – MACON 92.3 – Urban contemporary
- WQMJ – Majic 100 FM – Urban oldies
- WRBV – V-101.7 – Urban adult contemporary
- WRWR – Kiss 105.1/107.5 – Urban adult contemporary
- WYPZ - Praise 99.5 - Urban gospel
- WMGE - Macon's BIN 1670 - Black-oriented news
- WUXL - My City - Urban gospel

=== Albany ===
- WUTU - "Old School Classics 88.3" - Urban Oldies
- WJYZ – AM960 the Light – Urban contemporary gospel
- WJIZ-FM – 96.3 WJIZ – Mainstream urban
- WQVE – V-101.7 – Urban adult contemporary
- WMRZ – 98.1 Kiss FM - Urban adult contemporary
- WZBN – Praise 105.5 - Urban contemporary gospel
- WMRG – "Streetz 93.5" - Urban contemporary
- WASU-LP - "Real 92.7" - Urban contemporary
- WTTY - "97.7 The Beat" - Urban Adult Contemporary

=== Brunswick ===
- WSOL-FM - V-101.5 – Urban Adult Contemporary
- WBGA - Real 96.3 – Urban contemporary

=== Valdosta ===
- WGUN – Magic 950 – Urban adult contemporary
- WHLJ-FM – Foxy 97.5 – Urban adult contemporary
- WGOV-FM – Power 96.7 – Mainstream urban
- WSTI-FM – Star 105.3 – Urban Adult Contemporary
- WWRQ-FM - 107.9 The Beat - Urban contemporary

=== Elberton ===
- WVGC - Jams 1400 - Urban adult contemporary

=== Dublin ===
- WDBN - 107.9 Jamz - Urban contemporary

=== Irwinton ===
- WVKX - Love 103.7 - Urban contemporary

=== Lincolnton ===
- WLCZ - Gospel/Inspirational

== Hawaii ==
=== Honolulu ===
- KUBT – 93.9 The Beat – Rhythmic contemporary
  - KUBT HD-2 - Jamz Hawaii - Classic Hip Hop
- KUMU-FM – 94.7 KUMU – Rhythmic adult contemporary
- KPHW - Power 104.3 - Rhythmic Top 40
- KQMQ-FM - HI93 - Contemporary Hawaiian/Reggae
- KDNN - Island 98.5 - Hawaiian contemporary hits
- KCCN-FM - FM100 - Hawaiian contemporary hits

=== Maui ===
- KLHI-FM - HI92 - Hawaiian/Reggae

=== Kauai ===
- KSRF - HI95 - Contemporary Hawaiian/Reggae

== Idaho ==
=== Boise ===
- KWYD - Wild 101.1 – Rhythmic contemporary
- KFXD - Power 105.5 - Rhythmic contemporary
- KOAY - Project 88.7 - Rhythmic-leaning Christian Top-40

=== Twin Falls ===
- KXTA-HD3 - Mega 97.5 - Bilingual CHR

== Illinois ==
=== Bloomington ===
- WXRJ-LP - Real Radio 94.9 - Urban Adult Contemporary

=== Chicago ===
- WGRB – Inspiration 1390 – Urban contemporary gospel
- WGCI-FM – 107.5 WGCI – Urban contemporary
- WVAZ – V103 – Urban adult contemporary
- WPWX – Power 92 – Urban contemporary
- WBBM-FM - B96 - Rhythmic Top 40
- WSRB – 106.3 WSRB – Urban adult contemporary
- WBMX - 104.3 Jams - Classic Hip Hop
- WVON - AM 1690 WVON - Urban Talk
- WYCA - Rejoice 102.3 - Urban Gospel
- WWHN - Comfortable Radio - Urban AC
- WCFS-HD2 - Streetz 95.1 - Urban contemporary
- WVIV-FM - Latino Mix 93.5 - Spanish CHR
- WBEZ-HD2 - WBEW Vocalo - Urban alternative
- WMFN/WVAZ-HD2 - Chicago's BIN 640 - Black-oriented news

=== Decatur ===
- WYDS-HD2 - Magic 95.5 - Urban Adult Contemporary

=== Champaign ===
- WLRW-HD2 - 97.9 The Vibe - Urban adult contemporary
- WILL-HD2 - Illinois Soul - Smooth jazz, neo soul, R&B

=== Peoria ===
- WAZU - Strictly Hip-Hop 90.7 FM - Urban Contemporary/Hip Hop
- WZPW – Z-92.3 – Rhythmic Top 40
- WPNV-LP - 106.3 WPNV - Urban Adult Contemporary
- WKZF - KZ-102.3 - Rhythmic Adult Contemporary
- WVEL - AM 1140 - Urban gospel
- WVBP - 92.9 & 107.5 The Vibe - Urban Adult Contemporary

=== Rockford ===
- WYRB – Power 106 – Rhythmic Top 40
  - WYRB HD-2 - Urban Adult Contemporary (Simulcast of WSRB in Chicago)
  - WYRB HD-3 - Urban Gospel (Simulcast of WYCA in Chicago)

=== Quad Cities ===
- WGVV-LP – Groove 92.5 – Urban Contemporary

=== Macomb ===
- WMQZ - ICON 104.1 - Classic hip hop

=== Peru ===
- WZOE-FM - ICON 98.1 - Classic hip hop

== Indiana ==
=== Indianapolis ===
- WTLC – 1310 the Light – Urban contemporary gospel
- WHHH - Hot 100.9 - Urban contemporary
- WTLC-FM – WTLC 106.7 – Urban adult contemporary
- WZRL - Real 98.3 - Mainstream urban
- WSYW - Exitos 94.3 - Spanish CHR
- WLHK-HD2 - Fuego 92.7 - Spanish tropical

=== South Bend ===
- WSMK – Smokin' 99.1 – Rhythmic Top 40
- WUBU - The New Mix 102.3 - Urban adult contemporary

=== Fort Wayne ===
- WJFX-HD2 - Loud 103.3 - Rhythmic Top 40/Hip Hop
- WRNP/WBCL HD-2 - Rhythm & Praise 94.1 - Urban Gospel

=== Evansville ===
- WEOA – 98.5 WEOA – Urban Contemporary

== Iowa ==
=== Waterloo ===
- KBBG – 88.1 – Urban contemporary/Community radio
- KBDJ-LP - KBDJ 97.1 The Hot Jamz - Urban Contemporary

== Kansas ==
=== Wichita ===
- KDGS – Power 93.5 – Rhythmic Top 40
- KYOM-LP - KYOM 104.9 - Urban Contemporary/Community Radio

== Kentucky ==
=== Louisville ===
- WLLV – Gospel 101.9 FM & 1240 AM – Urban Gospel
- WLOU/WLUE – 104.7 Jamz – Urban adult contemporary
- WGZB-FM – B96.5 – Mainstream urban
- WMJM – Magic 101.3 – Urban adult contemporary
- WTFX-FM – Real 93.1 – Mainstream urban

=== Lexington ===
- WBTF – 107.9 the Beat – Mainstream Urban
- WLKT HD-2 – Real 103.9 – Mainstream Urban
- WUKY HD-2 - The Break 91.3 HD-2 - R&B, Jazz, Hip Hop, Urban Variety

=== Paducah/Mayfield ===
- WBMP - (AM 570) 102.5 / 100.9 The Beat - Mainstream Urban

=== Pineville ===
- WQJM - Jamz 98.1 - Rhythmic Hot AC

=== Bowling Green ===
- WWKU - 98 Jamz - Rhythmic adult contemporary

== Louisiana ==
=== New Orleans ===
- WBOK & KKNO - WBOK 1230 AM - Urban Talk, Urban Gospel, Brokered Programming
- WYLD – Hallelujah 940 – Urban contemporary gospel
- WODT/K244FX - New Orleans’ BIN 1280 - Black-oriented news
- WQUE-FM – Q93.3 – Mainstream urban
- WYLD-FM – 98.5 WYLD – Urban adult contemporary
- KMEZ – KMEZ 102.9 – Urban adult contemporary
- WRNO-HD2/K242CE - Throwback 96.3 - Classic hip hop
- WRKN - Heaven 106.1 - Urban Gospel
- WFNO - Latino Mix 97.5 - Spanish Hot AC
- KGLA - Tropical 105.7 - Spanish tropical
- KLRZ - Streetz 100.3 - Urban contemporary

=== Baton Rouge ===
- WPFC – 1550 WPFC - Urban Gospel
- WXOK – Heaven 1460 – Urban contemporary gospel
- KQXL-FM – Q106.5 – Urban adult contemporary
- KHXT – Hot 107.9 – Rhythmic contemporary (Lafayette)
- WEMX – Max 94.1 – Urban contemporary
- WTQT-LP - 106.1 - Urban gospel
- KCLF - 1500 - Rhythmic oldies

=== Lafayette ===
- KFXZ-FM – Z105.9 – Urban adult contemporary
- KNEK-FM – Magic 104.7 KNEK – Urban adult contemporary
- KHXT – Hot 107.9 – Rhythmic contemporary hit radio
- KRRQ – Q95.5 – Urban contemporary
- KZJM-LP - 92.7 Jam Central - Urban Contemporary
  - KQXP-LP - 104.1 Jam Expo - Simulcast of KZJM

=== Shreveport/Bossier City ===
- KMJJ-FM – 99.7 KMJJ – Urban contemporary
- KBTT – 103.7 Tha Beat – Urban contemporary
- KDKS-FM – Hot 102 – Urban adult contemporary
- KVMA-FM – Magic 102.9 – Urban adult contemporary
- KOKA – AM 980 KOKA – Urban contemporary gospel
- KIOU – 1480 – Urban contemporary gospel
- KSYB – 1300 – Urban contemporary gospel
- WKSH-LP - 97.7 Da Heat - Urban Contemporary

=== Lake Charles ===
- KJMH – 107 Jamz – Urban Contemporary
- KZWA – Live 104.9 – Urban Adult Contemporary
- KPPM-LP - KPPM 93.5 FM - Urban Gospel

=== Houma/Thibodaux ===
- KJIN - 104.7 Jamz - Urban Adult Contemporary

=== Monroe/West Monroe/Bastrop ===
- KRVV – 100.1 The Beat – Urban contemporary
- KMVX – Mix 101.9 – Urban adult contemporary
- KXRR - Magic 106.1 - Urban Adult Contemporary
- KOUS-LP - 96.3 - Urban Oldies

=== Alexandria/Pineville ===
- KTTP – KTTP AM 1110 – Urban contemporary gospel
- KKST – Kiss 98.7 – Urban contemporary
  - KKST-HD2 - Urban adult contemporary
  - KKST-HD3 - Urban contemporary gospel
- KMXH – Mix 93.9 – Urban adult contemporary, Blues

=== Ruston/Grambling ===
- KRUS – Hitz 96.3 – Urban contemporary

=== Tallulah ===
- KTJZ - Praise 97.5 - Urban contemporary gospel

== Maine ==
=== Augusta ===
- WHTP – Hot Radio Maine – Top 40 (Rhythmic)

=== Bangor ===
- WHZP – Hot Radio Maine – Top 40 (Rhythmic)

=== Portland ===
- WHTP-FM – Hot 104.7 – Top 40 (Rhythmic)

== Maryland ==
=== Baltimore ===
- WCAO – Heaven 600AM – Urban contemporary gospel
- WOLB – 1010 - Urban News/Talk
- WQLL - Baltimore's BIN 1370 - Black-oriented news
- WWIN – Baltimore's BIN 1400 – Black-oriented news
- WERQ-FM – 92Q Jams – Urban contemporary
- WWIN-FM – Magic 95.9 – Urban adult contemporary
- WLIF HD-2 - Praise 106.1 - Urban Gospel

=== Salisbury ===
- WSBY – Magic 98.9 – Urban adult contemporary
- WESM – FM 91.3 – Jazz
- WZEB – Power 101.7 - Rhythmic Top 40
- WKTT - Live 97.5 - Mainstream Urban
- WKDB - Maxima 95.3 - Spanish CHR

=== Hagerstown ===
- WDLD - Live 96.7 - Rhythmic Top 40

=== Elkton ===
- WSRY - Reach Gospel Radio - Urban gospel

== Massachusetts ==
=== Boston/Lawrence ===
- WJMN-FM – Jam'n 94.5 – Rhythmic contemporary
  - WJMN-HD2 - Black Information Network - Black-oriented news
- WBQT- Hot 96.9 – Rhythmic Hot AC
- WCCM - Exitos 103.7 FM & 1490 AM - Spanish CHR
- WAMG - "Mega 96.5" - Spanish tropical
- WLLH - "Mega 95.1" - Spanish tropical
- WERS-HD2 - WERS Plus 88.9 HD-2 Boston's Black Experience - Urban contemporary
- WZRM - Rumba 97.7 - Spanish tropical
- WJDA - "Latina 99.9 FM" - Reggaeton
- WNNW - "Power 800 AM/102.9 FM" - Spanish tropical

=== Springfield ===
- WHYN-HD2 - 97.3 The Beat - Urban contemporary
- WACM - Jammin' 100.1 - Rhythmic Top-40
- WSPR - Bomba FM - Spanish tropical
- WHLL - Nueva 98.1 - Spanish CHR

=== Worcester ===
- WORC - "Mega 106.1" - Spanish tropical

== Michigan ==
=== Detroit ===
- WMXD – Mix 92.3 – Urban adult contemporary
- WJLB – 97.9 WJLB – Urban contemporary
- WDMK – 105.9 Kiss FM – Urban adult contemporary
  - WDMK HD-2 - The Detroit Praise Network 98.3 & 99.9 - Urban Gospel
- WGPR – Hot 107-5 – Urban contemporary
- WMGC-FM - 105.1 The Bounce - Classic Hip-Hop & R&B
- WCHB – 1340 WCHB - Urban contemporary gospel
- WMKM - Rejoice AM 1440 - Urban Gospel
- WDFN - Detroit's BIN 1130 - Black-oriented news
- WSHJ - 88.3 FM - Urban contemporary

=== Grand Rapids ===
- WDPW – Power 91.9 – Urban contemporary gospel
- WJWC-LP - 97.3 The Heat - Urban Contemporary/ Community radio
- WNWZ – Magic 104.9 – Urban Contemporary
- WPRR - 102.5 The Ride - Urban Adult Contemporary

=== Kalamazoo/Battle Creek ===
- WFPM-LP - Miracle Radio 99.5 FM - Urban gospel
- WBXX/WKFR-HD2 - 102.5/104.9 The Block - Urban adult contemporary
- WTOU – The Touch 96.5 – Urban adult contemporary

=== Lansing ===
- WWSJ – Joy 1580 & 100.3 – Urban contemporary gospel
- WQHH – Power 96.5 FM – Urban contemporary
- WQTX - Stacks 92.1 - Rhythmic Adult Contemporary

=== Muskegon ===
- WVIB – V100 – Urban adult contemporary
- WUVS-LP – 103.7 The Beat – Urban contemporary/Community radio
- WUGM-LP – 106.1 – Motown / Electronic dance music

=== Flint ===
- WFLT - AM 1420 - Urban Gospel
- WDZZ-FM – Z92.7 – Urban adult contemporary
- WRCL – Club 93.7 – Rhythmic contemporary hit radio
- WOWE - 98.9 The Beat - Urban Contemporary

=== Saginaw/Bay City ===
- WTLZ – Kiss 107.1 – Urban adult contemporary

=== Greenville ===
- WDPW - Power 91.9 - Urban contemporary gospel

=== Benton Harbor ===
- WHFB - 102.5 FM & AM 1060 WHFB - Urban Oldies
- WVBH-LP - Power 105.3 - Urban Contemporary

== Minnesota ==
=== Minneapolis/Saint Paul ===
- KMOJ – 89.9 KMOJ – Urban contemporary/Community radio
  - KMOJ-HD2 - The Ice 89.9 HD-2 - Hip Hop
- KCMP-HD2 - Carbon Sound - Urban alternative
- KTCZ-HD3 - Hot 102.5 - Mainstream urban
- KQQL-HD2/W227BF - Twin Cities’ BIN 93.3 - Black-oriented news

== Mississippi ==
=== Jackson ===
- WOAD – Gospel 1300 AM & 103.5 FM - Urban contemporary gospel
- WJSU-FM – FM 88 – Jazz
  - WJSU-HD2 - JSU Tigers The Sipp - Urban Alternative
- WMPR – WMPR 90.1 FM - Urban contemporary, Blues, Urban Gospel, Variety
- WHLH – 95.5 Hallelujah FM – Urban contemporary gospel
- WRBJ-FM – 97.7 FM – Urban contemporary
- WJMI – 99 Jams – Mainstream urban
- WKXI-FM – Kixie 107 – Urban adult contemporary
- WRTM-FM – Smooth 100.5 – Urban adult contemporary
- WFQY – BDAY 99.1 – Old-school hip hop
- WJDX-FM - Real 105.1 - Mainstream urban
- WSFZ/W251DB - Jackson's BIN 98.1 - Black-oriented news
- WMGO - AM 1370 - Urban contemporary
- WDXO/WOEG - G93 - Classic hip hop

=== Gulfport/Biloxi ===
- WQFX – My Power Gospel 98.7 FM & 1130 AM – Urban contemporary gospel
- WJZD-FM – JZ94.5 – Urban contemporary
- WGBL - G-96.7 - Classic Hip Hop
- WGCM - Hype 100.9 - Rhythmic adult contemporary

=== Hattiesburg/Laurel ===
- WHJA – Power 101.1 – Urban contemporary
- WORV – WORV 1580 AM – Urban contemporary gospel
- WJKX – 102JKX – Urban adult contemporary
- WJMG – 92.1 WJMG – Urban contemporary
- WZLD – Wild 106.3 – Mainstream urban
- WGDQ - 93.1 WGDQ - Urban Gospel
- WQID-LP - Hot 105.3 - Urban contemporary
- WKZW HD-2 - 97.7 The Groove - Urban Oldies

=== Greenville/Greenwood ===
- WIBT – 97.9 The Beat – Urban contemporary
- WBAD – Bad 94 – Urban adult contemporary/Blues
- WGNG – 106.3 The Heat – Urban contemporary
- WGNL – 104.3 WGNL – Urban oldies
- KZYQ - Star 101 - Urban adult contemporary
- WNLA & WNLA-FM - Gospel
- WXTN - Urban contemporary gospel
- WAGR-FM - Power 102.5 - Urban contemporary gospel
- WBZL - G103.3 - Classic hip hop

=== Clarksdale/Cleveland ===
- WAID – "Power 106.5" – Urban contemporary
- WCLD-FM – "Jammin' 104" – Urban contemporary
- WZYQ - "Star 101" - Urban adult contemporary
- WCLD - "Rejoice 1490 AM & 96.5 FM" - Gospel

=== Meridian ===
- WJXM - 95.1 The Beat - Mainstream Urban
- WMER – Solid Gospel 1390 – Urban contemporary gospel
- WZKS – Kiss 104.1 – Urban adult contemporary
- WMOG - Praise 95.9 FM & 910 AM - Urban Gospel
- WHSL - Hot 107.7 - Urban adult contemporary

=== Tupelo ===
- WESE – 92.5 THE BEAT – Urban contemporary
- WSEL-FM – Inspiration 97 – Urban contemporary gospel
- WELO/W282AS - Pulse 104.3 & 580 - Classic soul
- WTUP/W299CS- Tupelo's BIN 107.7 - Black-oriented news

=== Columbus ===
- WACR-FM – WACR 105.3 – Urban adult contemporary
- WAJV – Joy 98.9 – Urban contemporary gospel
- WMSU – Power 92 Jamz – Mainstream urban
- WMXU – Mix 106.1 – Urban adult contemporary
- WTWG - AM 1050 - Gospel

=== Liberty ===
- WAZA - The Touch WAZA - Urban adult contemporary

=== Holly Springs ===
- WKRA-FM - The Change 92.7 - Urban Gospel/Urban Contemporary

=== Natchez ===
- WNAT - Jam’n 106.3 - Rhythmic AC
- WTYJ - 97.7 The Beat - Urban contemporary

== Missouri ==
=== St. Louis ===
- KATZ – Hallelujah 1600 AM – Urban contemporary gospel
- KSTL – Jubilee 690 – Urban contemporary gospel
- KATZ-FM – 100.3 The Beat – Mainstream urban
  - KATZ-HD2/W279AQ – St Louis’ BIN 103.7 - Black-oriented news
- WFUN-FM – 96.3 The Lou – Urban adult contemporary
- KEZK-FM HD-2/K254CR – Hot 98.7 – Urban contemporary
- KTLK-FM HD2 - Majic 104.9 HD-2 - Urban Adult Contemporary
- KSIQ-LP - Mix 99.5 - Urban Adult Contemporary
- KXBS-HD2 – 95.5 HD2 Jams – Urban contemporary
- KXBS-HD3 - Foxy 106.9 - Urban adult contemporary

=== Kansas City ===
- KPRT – Gospel 1590 AM & 106.1 FM KPRT – Urban Gospel
- KPRS – Hot 103 Jamz – Urban contemporary
  - KPRS-HD2 - RNB 106.9 - Urban oldies
- KCPZ-LP - Praise 95.3 - Urban Gospel

=== Columbia/Jefferson City ===
- KJLU – 88.9 – Jazz/Urban contemporary

=== Jackson/Cape Girardeau ===
- KJXX - 101.9 The Block - Rhythmic Adult Contemporary

== Montana ==
=== Missoula ===
- KHKM - 98.7 The Beat of Montana - Classic Hip Hop

== Nebraska ==
=== Omaha ===
- KOWN-LP - 95.7 The Boss - Urban Contemporary/Hip Hop
- KXNB-LP - Mind And Soul 101.3 - Urban Contemporary
- KJSO-LP - 101.3 FM - Hip Hop (Shares time with KXNB-LP)
- KCUG-LP - 100.3 FM - Urban Gospel

=== Lincoln ===
- KBBK HD-2 - Red 94.5 - Rhythmic-leaning Top-40

=== Grand Island/Kearney ===
- KRGI HD-4 - Mix 103.5 - Classic Hip Hop

== Nevada ==
=== Las Vegas ===
- KCEP – Power 88FM – Urban contemporary/Community radio
- KVEG – Hot 97.5 – Rhythmic contemporary hit radio/Hip hop
- KYMT-HD2 - Real 103.9 - Urban Contemporary
- KXQQ-FM - Q100.5 - Rhythmic Adult Contemporary
  - KXQQ-HD3 - 100.5 Jamz - Hip hop
- KRGT - Latino Beats 99.3 - Spanish Urban
- KRRN - Fuego 92.7 - Bilingual Rhythmic Contemporary
- KBET - 103.1 The Hustle - Urban contemporary
- KKLZ-HD2 - 96.3 HD2 The Bounce - Classic hip hop

=== Reno ===
- KNEV - 95.5 The Vibe - Classic Hip Hop
- KLCA HD-2/K285EQ/K228DA - Swag 104.9 & 93.5 - Urban Contemporary/Hip Hop
- KWYL - Wild 102.9 - Rhythmic Top 40
- KZTI - Jammin 105.3 - Rhythmic adult contemporary

== New Hampshire ==
=== Concord ===
WJYY - 105.5 JYY - Rhythmic Top 40

== New Jersey ==
=== Atlantic City ===
- WEHA – 88.7 - Urban Gospel
- WTTH – 96.1 WTTH – Urban adult contemporary
- WZBZ – 99.3 The Buzz – Rhythmic Top 40

=== Beach Haven West ===
- WVBH - Reach Gospel Radio 88.3 FM - Urban gospel

=== Trenton ===
- WIFI - Maxima 92.9 - Spanish CHR

== New Mexico ==
=== Albuquerque/Santa Fe ===
- KKSS – Kiss 97.3 – Rhythmic contemporary hit radio
- KMGG-LP - 99.9 The Beat - Urban adult contemporary
  - KMGG-LP HD-3 - Wild 99.9 HD-3 - Urban contemporary
- KABQ-FM - Hot 95.1 - Rhythmic Oldies / Classic hip hop
- KZRR HD-2/K265CA - Power 100.9 - Mainstream urban
- KYLZ - 101.3 The Hustle - Mainstream urban
- KJFA-FM - Fuego 102.9 - Hispanic rhythmic
- KLBU - Jam'n 94.7 - Rhythmic contemporary

=== Las Cruces ===
- KHQT - Hot 103.1 - Rhythmic Top 40
- KSIL - Latin X 94.3 - Bilingual Rhythmic CHR
- KWML - Kool 104.5 - Rhythmic adult contemporary

=== Farmington ===
- KXTC - 99.9 XTC - Rhythmic Top 40

== New York ==
=== New York City ===
- WLIB – 1190 WLIB – Urban contemporary gospel
- WBLS – 107.5 WBLS – Urban adult contemporary
- WKTU – KTU 103.5 – Rhythmic adult contemporary
- WQHT – Hot 97 – Urban contemporary
- WWPR-FM – Power 105.1 – Mainstream urban
- WWRL - New York's BIN 1600 - Black-oriented news
- WXNY-FM - La X 96.3 - Hispanic rhythmic
- WXBK - 94.7 The Block - Classic hip hop
- WSKQ-FM - Mega 97.9 - Spanish tropical
- WPAT-FM - 93.1 Amor - Spanish tropical
- WKRB - Rhythmic top 40

=== Buffalo ===
- WUFO – Power 96.5 – Urban adult contemporary
- WWWS – Classic R&B 107.3 FM & AM 1400 – Urban oldies
- WBLK – Power 93.7 WBLK – Urban contemporary
  - WBLK-HD2 – Urban adult contemporary

=== Rochester ===
- WDKX – 103.9 WDKX – Urban contemporary
- WLGZ-HD2 - 105.5 The Beat - Urban Contemporary
- WXIR-LP - 100.9 Extreme Independent Radio - Urban variety
- WRSB - Mega 97.5 - Spanish CHR

=== Syracuse ===
- WHEN/W269DT/WSYR-FM HD 2 – Power 620 – Urban adult contemporary
- WJPZ – Z89 – Rhythmic Top 40
- WMVN – 96.5/100.3 The Beat – Rhythmic Top 40

=== Albany ===
- WAJZ – Jamz 96.3 – Rhythmic contemporary hit radio
- WQBK-HD2 – Hot 99.1 – Urban contemporary

=== Binghamton ===
- WJOB-FM - 93.3 WJOB - Urban Contemporary

=== Utica ===
- WUSP/WRCK - 95.5 The Heat - Urban contemporary

== North Carolina ==
=== Asheville ===
- WRES-LP - WRES 100.7 - Urban Contemporary/Urban Variety
- WQNQ HD-2 - Throwbacks 101.1 - Classic Hip Hop

=== Charlotte ===
- WDEX – 1430 AM – Urban Gospel
- WPZS – Praise 102.5 & 610 – Urban Gospel
- WOSF – 105.3 RNB – Urban Adult Contemporary
- WBAV – V101.9 – Urban Adult Contemporary
- WGIV – 1370 AM / W277CB / W263CY Streetz 103.3 & 100.5 – Mainstream Urban
- WPEG – Power 98 – Mainstream Urban
- WRFX-HD2/W254AZ - Charlotte's BIN 98.7 - Black-oriented news
- WOGR-FM - Wordnet 93.3 - Urban Gospel
- WGSP/WGSP-FM - Kaliente 102.3 y 107.5 - Spanish tropical

=== Greensboro/Winston-Salem/High Point ===
- WJMH – 102 Jamz – Mainstream Urban
- WQMG - 97.1 QMG - Urban Adult Contemporary
- WKEW/WPOL – The Light 1340 & 1400 – Urban contemporary gospel
- WBLO - Kaliente 106.9 - Spanish tropical
- WNAA - The Voice 90.1 - R&B, Blues, Jazz, Urban Gospel, Variety

=== Raleigh/Durham ===
- WAUG – Hot 97.9 FM/750 AM – Mainstream Urban
- WDCG-HD2 - 95.1/95.3 The Beat - Classic Hip Hop
- WQOK – K 97.5 – Mainstream Urban
- WFXC/WFXK – Foxy 107.1/104.3 – Urban Adult Contemporary
- WNNL - The Light 103.9 - Urban Gospel

=== Fayetteville/Lumberton/Fairmont ===
- WCCG – 104.5 – Mainstream Urban
- WZFX – Foxy 99.1 – Mainstream Urban
- WMGU – Magic 106.9 – Urban Adult Contemporary
- WUKS – 107.7 The Bounce – Classic Hip Hop
- WIDU - 99.7 FM/1600 AM - Urban Gospel
- WYDU - 98.5 FM/1160 AM - Urban Gospel
- WAGR - 97.1 FM/1340 AM - Urban Gospel
- WFMO - The Light 97.5 FM/860 AM - Urban Gospel

=== Wilmington ===
- WMNX – Coast 97.3 – Mainstream Urban
- WKXB – Jammin 99.9 – Rhythmic Oldies

=== New Bern/Greenville/Jacksonville/Moorehead City ===
- WIKS – 101.9 Kiss FM – Mainstream Urban
- WNCT – Beach Boogie & Blues 1070 AM / 105.9 / 95.7 / 101.1 – Rhythmic Oldies

=== Rocky Mount/Wilson ===
- WRSV - Choice FM 92.1 - Mainstream Urban
- WPWZ - Power 95.5 - Mainstream Urban
- WYLT-LP - Smooth Radio 100.3 - Urban oldies, Southern soul
- WAJA-LP - 102.5 The Promise - Urban Gospel
- WCPS - Power 96.3 FM/760 AM – Urban Gospel, Urban Oldies, Southern Soul
- WRMT - Step 98.1 FM/1490 AM - Urban Gospel
- WEED - Jammin Gospel 1390 AM – Urban Gospel
- WUBN-LP - 106.9 The Spirit – Urban Gospel
- WZAX - 99.3 The Beach - Beach music

=== Warrenton ===
- WARR 103.5 FM/1520 AM – Urban Gospel, Urban Oldies, Southern Soul

=== Louisburg ===
- WYRN 106.9 FM/1480 AM - Urban Gospel, Urban Oldies, Southern Soul

=== Elizabeth City/Nags Head ===
- WFMZ 104.9 The Block – Urban Adult Contemporary
- WBXB Love 100.1 – Urban Gospel
- WFMI Rejoice 100.9 - Urban Gospel
- WRVS-FM - 89.9 - Urban Contemporary

=== Goldsboro/Kinston ===
- WSSG 92.7 Jamz FM/1300 AM - Mainstream Urban
- WELS-FM Beach Boogie & Blues 102.9 - Rhythmic Oldies

=== Roanoke Rapids ===
- WYTT/WWDR 99.5 & 105.9 Jamz - Urban Adult Contemporary
- WCBT Soul 102.7/1230AM - Urban Gospel, Urban Oldies, Southern Soul

=== Canton ===
- WXKL - Urban Gospel, Urban Oldies

=== Yanceyville ===
- WYNC - Urban gospel

== North Dakota ==
=== Fargo ===
- KLTA-HD2/K245BY - 96.9 Hits FM - Rhythmic Top 40

== Ohio ==
=== Cleveland ===
- WENZ – Z-107.9 – Mainstream Urban
  - WENZ-HD2 – Praise 94.5 – Urban contemporary gospel
- WZAK – 93.1 WZAK – Urban adult contemporary
- WAKS-HD2 - Real 106.1 - Urban contemporary
- WMMS-HD3 - Cleveland's BIN 101.1 - Black-oriented news
- WCCD - Urban gospel
- WABQ - Urban gospel
- WERE - NewsTalk 1490 - Urban talk/Brokered programming
- WOVU-LP - Urban alternative

=== Cincinnati ===
- WIZF – 101.1 The Wiz – Mainstream urban
- WOSL – 100.3 R&B – Urban oldies-leaning urban adult contemporary
- WEBN-HD3 – 102.3 The Beat – Mainstream urban
- WGRI – Inspiration 1050 & 103.1 – Urban contemporary gospel
- WDBZ – The Buzz 1230 AM – Urban Talk/Urban Contemporary
- WCVG - 1320 The Voice - Urban Gospel/Brokered Programming

=== Columbus ===
- WZCB – 106.7 The Beat – Mainstream Urban
  - WZCB HD-2 - Throwback 105.3 - Classic Hip Hop
- WCKX – Power 107.5 – Urban Contemporary
- WXMG – Magic 95.5 – Urban Adult Contemporary
- WYTS - Columbus’ BIN 1230 - Black-oriented news
- WJYD – Joy 106.3 - Black Gospel

=== Dayton ===
- WDHT – Hot 102.9 – Rhythmic contemporary/Hip Hop
- WROU-FM – 92.1 WROU – Urban adult contemporary
- WDAO – WDAO 1210 AM – Urban adult contemporary
- WHKO-HD3 – The Soul of Dayton 98.7 – Urban oldies
- WIZE - Dayton's BIN 1340 - Black-oriented news

=== Toledo ===
- WJZE – Hot 97-3 – Mainstream urban
- WJUC – 107.3 the Juice – Classic Hip Hop/Urban Adult Contemporary
- WIMX – Mix 95.7 – Urban adult contemporary
- WVKS-HD2 – 94.9 The Beat – Mainstream urban

=== Youngstown ===
- WLOA - Loud 102.3 - Rhythmic contemporary/Hip Hop
- WAKZ - Real 95.9 - Mainstream urban
- WKTX - 99.7 The Drum - Urban oldies/Urban contemporary gospel

=== Englewood ===
- WGJM-LP - 97.9 Praise FM - Urban gospel

== Oklahoma ==
=== Oklahoma City ===
- KRMP – Heart & Soul 92.1 & 1140 – Urban adult contemporary
- KTLV – AM 1220 – Urban contemporary gospel
- KVSP – Power 103.5 – Mainstream urban
- KOMA-HD3 - V103 - Rhythmic adult contemporary

=== Tulsa ===
- KGTO – Heart & Soul 99.1 & 1050 – Urban adult contemporary
- KJMM – 105.3 - 105 K-Jamz – Mainstream urban

=== Lawton ===
- KJMZ – 97.9 Jamz – Urban contemporary
- KXCA – Heart & Soul 96.7 & 1380 – Urban adult contemporary

=== Langston ===
- KALU – 89.3 – Urban Contemporary/College Radio

== Oregon ==
=== Portland ===
- KBMS – Best Music Station 1480 AM & 97.5 FM – Urban adult contemporary
- KXJM – Jam'n 107.5 – Rhythmic Hot AC
- KOOR - 1010 Urbana - Spanish urban

=== Klamath Falls ===
- KKKJ - 3KJ Jammin 105.5 - Rhythmic CHR

== Pennsylvania ==
=== Easton/Allentown/Bethlehem ===
- WEST/WHOL - Loud 106.9/99.5 - Rhythmic Contemporary/Hip Hop
- WTKZ - Mega 101.7 - Spanish CHR

=== Erie ===
- WXKC HD-2 - 104.3 The Touch - Urban Adult Contemporary

=== Harrisburg ===
- WHKF - Real 99.3 - Mainstream Urban
- WWKL - Hot 106.7 - Rhythmic Contemporary

=== Philadelphia ===
- WURD – AM 900 – Urban talk
- WPPZ – Classix 107.9 – Urban oldies
  - WPPZ-HD2 - Praise 107.9 HD2 - Urban contemporary gospel
- WDAS-FM – 105.3 WDAS – Urban adult contemporary
- WRNB – 100.3 RNB – Urban adult contemporary
  - WRNB HD-2 - 100.3 HD2 R&B & Hip-Hop - Urban contemporary
  - WRNB HD-3 - Philly's Favor 100.7 - Urban contemporary gospel
- WUSL – Power 99FM – Mainstream urban
- WTEL - Philadelphia’s BIN 610 - Black-oriented news
- WUMR - Rumba 106.1 - Spanish CHR
- WEMG - Mega 105.7 - Spanish CHR
- WHAT - La Kalle 99.9 - Spanish tropical

=== Pittsburgh ===
- WGBN – Power 1360 & 98.9 FM – Urban Gospel
- WAMO/WDSY HD-2 - WAMO 107.3 - Urban Contemporary/Hip Hop

=== Reading ===
- WLAN - Rumba 100.5 - Spanish tropical
- WRLD - Loud 98.5 - Rhythmic Contemporary/Hip Hop

=== Scranton ===
- WWRR-HD3 - Loud 103.7 - Rhythmic Contemporary/Hip Hop

=== State College ===
- WRSC HD-3 - Loud 101.5 - Rhythmic Contemporary/Hip Hop

=== Wilkes-Barre ===
- WLMZ HD-3 - 102.3 HD-3 The Diamond - Urban Contemporary/Hip Hop

== Rhode Island ==
=== Providence ===
- WVEI-FM HD-2 - The Juice 93.7 - Rhythmic Top 40
- WSTL - Mega 94.9 - Spanish tropical
- WPMZ - Poder 102.1 & 1110 - Spanish tropical

== South Carolina ==
=== Greenville/Spartanburg/Anderson ===
- WFBC-HD2 96.3/104.5/107.7 The Block - Mainstream Urban
- WJMZ – 107.3 Jamz – Urban Adult Contemporary
- WHZT - Hot 98.1 - Rhythmic Top 40
- WXRU-LP - Smooth 107.9 - Rhythmic Oldies, Urban Oldies
- WGVL - Greenville's BIN 1440 - Black-oriented news
- WASC - 1530 Solid Gold Soul - Urban Oldies
- WROQ-HD2/WOLI - Kaliente 102.9 & 105.7 - Spanish CHR

=== Charleston ===
- WJNI – Gospel 106.3 – Urban Gospel
- WSPO - Heaven 100.1 - Urban Gospel
- WWWZ - Z93 Jamz - Mainstream Urban
- WJNI-HD2 - Old school 92.1 - Classic Hip Hop
- WMGL – Magic 107.3 – Urban Adult Contemporary
- WXST – Star 99.7 – Urban Adult Contemporary
  - WXST-HD2 - 99.3 The Box - Mainstream Urban
- WZJY - Kaliente 95.5 - Spanish tropical

=== Columbia ===
- WFMV – Gospel 620 AM 96.1/98.9/107.1 – Urban Gospel
- WDEK - Praise 95.7 & 1170 - Urban Gospel
- WARQ-HD3 - 105.1 Worship and Word Network - Urban Gospel
- WXBT – 100.1 The Beat – Mainstream Urban
  - WXBT HD-2 - Columbia's BIN 105.5 - Black-oriented news
- WHXT/WSCZ – Hot 103.9/93.9 – Mainstream Urban
- WLXC – Kiss 103.1 – Urban Adult Contemporary
- WWDM – 101.3 The Big DM – Urban Adult Contemporary

=== Myrtle Beach ===
- WMIR – Rejoice 1200 AM/103.5 – Urban Gospel
- WPJS – Gospel 1330 AM – Urban Gospel
- WDAI – 98.5 Kiss FM – Mainstream Urban

=== Florence ===
- WBZF / WYNN – Glory 98.5 FM/540 AM – Urban Gospel
- WJAY - 98.3 FM/1280 AM - Urban Gospel
- WALD - 98.7 FM/1080 AM - Urban Gospel
- WPDT – Almighty 105.1 – Urban Gospel
- WCMG – Magic 94.3 – Urban Adult Contemporary
- WZTF – The Flo 102.9 – Urban Adult Contemporary
- WYNN – WYNN 106.3 – Mainstream Urban
- WDAR-FM – 105.5 The Beat – Mainstream Urban
- WSIM-HD2 - Jamz 107.5 - Classic Hip Hop

=== Sumter ===
- WXHL - Reach Gospel Radio 89.1 - Urban Gospel
- WLJI – Almighty 98.3 – Urban Gospel
- WWHM – Old Skool 93.3/92.3 – Urban Oldies

=== Orangeburg ===
- WOCS – 93.7 – Urban Adult Contemporary
- WQKI-FM – Jamz 95.7 – Classic Hip Hop
- WSPX – Almighty 94.5 – Urban Gospel

=== Camden ===
- WEAF - 1130 AM/99.5 - Urban Gospel

=== St. Stephen ===
- WTUA – Power 106 – Urban Gospel

=== Beaufort ===
- WVGB - Praise 94.5/1490 AM -Urban Gospel
- WKWQ - 100.7 -Urban Adult Contemporary

=== Greenwood ===
- WCZZ - Magic 102.7/1090 AM - Urban Oldies

=== Denmark ===
- WVCD - 96.5 FM/790 AM - Urban Adult Contemporary, Urban Gospel

=== Chester ===
- WGCD - Urban adult contemporary

== Tennessee ==
=== Memphis ===
- WBBP – AM 1480 - Urban Gospel
- WDIA – WDIA AM1070 – Urban oldies
- WLOK – 1340 WLOK – Urban contemporary gospel
- WLRM – Love WLRM 1380AM – Urban adult contemporary/Urban contemporary gospel
- KJMS – V101 – Urban adult contemporary
  - KJMS-HD2 - Black Information Network - Black-oriented news
- KXHT – Hot 107.1 – Mainstream urban
- WHAL-FM – Hallelujah 95.7 – Urban contemporary gospel
- WHRK – K-97.1 – Mainstream urban
- WRBO – 103.5 WRBO – Urban Adult Contemporary
- WQOX - 88.5 The Voice Of MSCS - Urban Adult Contemporary
- WHBQ-HD2 - Bumpin 96.3 - Classic hip hop

=== Nashville ===
- WNTC - 790 AM & 99.1 FM The Gospel - Urban Gospel
- WVOL – WVOL 1470 AM – Urban Oldies/Talk
- WQQK – 92Q – Urban adult contemporary
- WUBT – 101.1 The Beat – Urban contemporary
- WPRT-HD2 - 102.1 The Ville - Urban adult contemporary
- WNRQ-HD2/W248BQ - Nashville's BIN 97.5 - Black-oriented news

=== Knoxville ===
- WJBE – Jammin' 99.7 FM & 1040 AM – Urban Contemporary
- WKHT – Hot 104.5 – Rhythmic Top 40/ Mainstream Urban
- WTLT - Jump 97.1 - Classic Hip Hop

=== Chattanooga ===
- WNOO – 107.3 FM & 1260 AM – Urban Adult contemporary/Urban Gospel
- WJTT – Power 94 – Mainstream urban
- WMPZ – G93 – Urban adult contemporary
- WUSY HD-2 - Real 97.7 - Mainstream Urban
- WPTP-LP 100.1 - Urban Gospel

=== Jackson ===
- WFKX – KIX 95.7 – Urban contemporary
- WYJJ – JJ 97.7 – Urban adult contemporary
- WJAK - Hot 96.1 - 96.1/1460 - Urban contemporary

=== Johnson City ===
- WWTB – 105.3 The Beat – 105.3 FM/980 AM - Rhythmic Contemporary

=== Clarksville ===
- WCVQ-HD2 - 99.1 The Fort - Rhythmic Top 40

== Texas ==
=== Dallas/Fort Worth ===
- KGGR – KGGR 1040 AM – Urban contemporary gospel
- KHVN/KKGM/K237HD – Dallas’ BIN – Black-oriented news
- KBFB – 97.9 The Beat – Urban contemporary
- KKDA-FM – K104 – Urban contemporary
- KRNB – 105.7 RNB – Urban adult contemporary
- KDXX - Latino Mix 107.9 - Spanish CHR

=== Houston ===
- KCOH – 1230 The Source – Urban Oldies/Talk
- KYOK – KYOK AM 1140 & FM 92.3 – Urban contemporary gospel
- KWWJ – Gospel 96.9 FM & 1360 AM KWWJ – Urban contemporary gospel
- KBXX – 97.9 The Box – Urban contemporary
- KMJQ – Majic 102.1 – Urban adult contemporary
  - KMJQ-HD2 – Praise 102.1 HD2 – Urban Gospel
- KQBT – 93.7 The Beat – Urban contemporary
- KMAZ-LP - Amazing 102.5 - Urban Contemporary/Urban Gospel
- KTSU-HD2 - 90.9 The Vibe - Urban contemporary/Urban alternative
- KXYZ - Houston's BIN 1320 - Black-oriented news
- KAMA-FM - Latino Mix 104.9 - Spanish CHR

=== San Antonio ===
- KCHL – Gospel 92.1 FM & 1480 AM – Urban contemporary gospel
- KRTU-HD2/KROV-FM – 91.7 HD-2 KROV-FM – Urban contemporary/Community radio
- KBBT – 98.5 The Beat – Rhythmic contemporary
- KVBH - Vibe 107.5 - Rhythmic Adult Contemporary
- KZEP-FM - 104.5 Latino Hits - Spanish CHR

=== Austin ===
- KAZI – KAZI 88.7 – Urban contemporary/Community radio
- KPEZ – 102.3 The Beat – Rhythmic contemporary hit radio/Hip Hop

=== Beaumont/Port Arthur ===
- KZZB – KZZB, Rejoice 990 – Urban contemporary gospel
- KTCX – Magic 102.5 – Urban contemporary
- KKMY – 104.5 KISS-FM – Rhythmic Top 40
  - KKMY HD-2/K277AG – 103.3 The Beat – Mainstream urban

=== Amarillo ===
- KQIZ-FM – 93.1 The Beat – Rhythmic Top 40

=== Abilene ===
- KTJK-HD2 - Infinity FM - Rhythmic Top 40

=== Lubbock ===
- KBTE – 104.9 The Beat – Rhythmic Top 40

=== Killeen/Temple ===
- KIIZ-FM – Z92.3 – Mainstream urban
- KSSM – My Kiss 103.1 – Urban adult contemporary
- KOOC – B106 – Rhythmic contemporary hit radio

=== Odessa/Midland ===
- KZBT – B93 – Rhythmic contemporary/Hip Hop

=== Wichita Falls ===
- KQXC-FM – Hot 103.9 – Rhythmic Top 40

=== Corpus Christi ===
- KZFM – Hot Z95 – Rhythmic Top 40
- KNDA – 102.9 Da Bomb – Urban contemporary
- KOUL - Fuego Radio 107.7 & 103.3 - Bilingual Rhythmic CHR

=== El Paso ===
- KPRR – Power 102 – Rhythmic Top 40
  - KPRR-HD2 - Hot 93.5 - Rhythmic Oldies/Classic Hip Hop

=== McAllen/Brownsville/Harlingen ===
- KBFM – Wild 104 – Bilingual Rhythmic CHR
- KKPS - Fuego 99.5 - Bilingual Rhythmic CHR

=== Tyler/Longview ===
- KGLD - Gospel 1330 & 104.9 - Urban Gospel (Tyler)
- KBLZ / KAZE – 102.7 / 106.9 The Blaze – Rhythmic contemporary/Hip-Hop
- KISX – 107.3 Kiss-FM – Urban adult contemporary

=== Lufkin/Nacogdoches ===
- KZXL - Hot 96.3 - Urban Contemporary
- KSML - Power 103.7 - Urban Gospel/Urban Adult Contemporary

=== Texarkana ===
- KTOY – 104.7 KTOY – Urban Adult Contemporary
- KMJI - Majic 93.3 - Urban Contemporary

=== Waco ===
- KBGO-HD2/K236BR - Z95.1 - Urban contemporary
- KRMX-HD4/K297CC - The Beat 107.3 - Urban contemporary/Hip-Hop

=== Jacksonville ===
- KJTX – 104.5 KJTX – Urban contemporary gospel

=== San Angelo ===
- KMDX - 106.1 MDX - Rhythmic contemporary

=== Bryan/College Station ===
- KBXT - 101.9 The Beat - Urban Contemporary
- KAGC - Magic 97.3 - Urban Adult Contemporary

== Utah ==
=== Salt Lake City ===
- KUUU – 92.5 The Beat – Classic Hip Hop/Rhythmic Contemporary
- KBMG - Latino 106.3 - Spanish CHR

== Vermont ==
=== Burlington ===
WJMP - Jump 103.7 - Classic Hip Hop

== Virginia ==
=== Norfolk/Virginia Beach/Newport News ===
- WGPL – WGPL 1350 AM – Urban contemporary gospel
- WPCE – Peace Radio 1400 AM - Urban contemporary gospel
- WFMI – Rejoice 100.9FM – Urban contemporary gospel
- WHBT-FM – 92.1 The Beat – Old-school hip hop
- WNVZ – Z104 – Rhythmic Top 40
- WMTO-LD/WXTG-FM - Streetz 87.7 & 102.1 - Urban contemporary
- WNSB – Hot 91.1 – Urban contemporary
- WOWI – 103 Jamz – Mainstream urban
- WVKL – 95-7 R&B – Urban adult contemporary
- WNOH - Norfolk's BIN 105.3 - Black-oriented news
- WVBW-FM - 100.5 The Vibe - Urban adult hits
- WVXX - La Selecta 103.3 FM 1050 AM - Spanish tropical

=== Richmond ===
- WPZZ – Praise 104.7 – Urban contemporary gospel
- WBTJ – 106.5 The Beat – Urban contemporary
- WCDX – iPower 92-1/104-1 – Urban contemporary
- WKJS/WKJM – 99.3/105.7 Kiss FM – Urban adult contemporary
- WXGI/WTPS - 99.5/102.7 The Box - Classic Hip Hop
- WQCN-LP - The Choice 105.3FM - Gospel
- WJSR - 100.9 The Hip Hop Station - Urban Contemporary

=== Roanoke/Lynchburg ===
- WLLL – Gospel Radio AM930 – Urban contemporary gospel
- WVBE-FM and WVBB – Vibe 100.1 & 97.7 – Urban adult contemporary (FM 97.7 serves Roanoke only)
- WROV-HD2/W244AV - Roanoke's BIN 96.7 - Black-oriented news
- WJJS/WJJX - 93.5 & 102.7 JJS Rhythmic Top 40

=== Lawrenceville ===
- WHLQ - Mix 105.5 - Urban contemporary gospel, Urban oldies, Southern soul

=== South Hill ===
- WSHV - 967WSHV - Urban oldies

=== Charlottesville ===
- WVAI-LP - 101 Jamz - Urban contemporary

=== Hampton Roads ===
- WHOV – 88.1 WHOV – Urban contemporary/Jazz/Black gospel
- WXTG - 101.9 FM & 1490 AM The Groove - Classic soul/Urban oldies

=== Pulaski ===
- WBLB - Family 1340 - Southern gospel/Black gospel

=== Danville ===
- WDVA - Great Gospel 1250 - Black gospel
- WKBY - Inspirational 1080 - Black gospel/Religious

=== Marion ===
- WHNK - Praise N’ Glory Radio - Black gospel

=== Franklin ===
- WJZU - Praise 99.1FM & 1250AM - Black gospel

=== South Boston ===
- WSBV - Black gospel

== Washington ==
=== Seattle/Tacoma ===
- KHHO - Seattle's BIN 850 - Black-oriented news
- KYIZ – 1620 - Z-Twins – Urban Adult Contemporary/Urban Talk
- KRIZ – 1420 - Z-Twins – Urban Gospel
- KHTP – HOT 103.7 – Classic hip hop
- KUBE-HD2 - KUBE 93.3 HD2 - Urban Contemporary

=== Spokane ===
- KEZE – Hot 96.9 – Rhythmic contemporary hit radio
- KZFS - Hooptown 101.5 - Classic hip hop

=== Yakima ===
- KHHK – Hot 99.7 – Rhythmic contemporary hit radio

== West Virginia ==
=== Charleston ===
- WRVZ - 107.3 The Beat – Rhythmic contemporary

=== Martinsburg ===
- WDLD - Live 96.7 - Rhythmic Top 40

== Wisconsin ==
=== Madison ===
- WJQM – 93.1 Jamz – Rhythmic contemporary

=== Milwaukee ===
- WGLB - WGLB 1560 AM & 96.1 FM - Urban Gospel
- WJMR-FM – Jammin' 98.3 – Urban adult contemporary
- WKKV – V-100.7 – Mainstream urban
- WNOV – The Voice 106.5 & 860 – Urban contemporary/Community radio
- WGKB - 101.7 The Truth – Black talk
- WYMS-HD2 - HYFIN 88.9 HD-2 - Urban alternative

== United States Insular area ==
=== American Samoa ===
==== Leone ====
- KKBT - 104.7 The Beat - Rhythmic Contemporary

=== Canada ===
==== Toronto, Ontario ====
- CKFG-FM - Flow 98.7 - Urban Contemporary
- CHRY-FM (105.5) - VIBE 105 - Urban Contemporary
- CIDC-FM - Z103.5 - Rhythmic Contemporary
- CJKX-HD2 - Wave.fm - Smooth jazz/Rhythmic AC

==== Montreal, Quebec ====
- CKBE-FM - The Beat 92.5 - Rhythmic Adult Contemporary

==== Edmonton, Alberta ====
- CKPW-FM - Play 107 - Rhythmic Adult Contemporary

==== Red Deer, Alberta ====
- CKIK-FM - Play 103.7 - Rhythmic Adult Contemporary

==== Fort McMurray, Alberta ====
- CFVR-FM - Play 101 - Rhythmic Adult Contemporary

==== Regina, Saskatchewan ====
- CHMX-FM - Play 92.1 - Rhythmic Adult Contemporary

==== Hamilton, Ontario ====
- CHKX-HD2 - Wave.fm - Smooth jazz/Rhythmic AC

==== Vancouver, British Columbia ====
- CIWV-FM - Wave 98.3 - Smooth jazz/Rhythmic AC

=== Guam ===
==== Hagåtña ====
- KZGZ (97.5) - Power 98 FM - Rhythmic Contemporary

=== Northern Mariana Islands ===
==== Garapan-Saipan ====
- KWAW - Magic 100.3 - Rhythmic Contemporary

=== Puerto Rico ===
==== San Juan ====
- WTOK-FM (102.5) – Hot 102 - Rhythmic contemporary
- WPRM-HD2 - Black Information Network - Black-oriented news
- WODA (94.7) - La Nueva 94 FM - Reggaeton/Spanish Urban AC
- WKAQ-FM (104.7) - KQ105 - Bilingual Rhythmic Top 40

==== Mayaguez ====
- WNOD (94.1) - La Nueva 94 FM - Reggaeton/Spanish Urban AC
- WUKQ-FM (98.7) - KQ105 - Bilingual Rhythmic Top 40

=== United States Virgin Islands ===
==== Charlotte Amalie ====
- WVJZ - 105 Jamz (105.3) - Mainstream urban/Reggae
- WWKS - Kiss 96.1 - Urban adult contemporary

==== Christiansted ====
- WJKC - Isle 95 (95.1) - Urban Contemporary/Reggae
- WSTX-FM - FM100 - Reggae
- WSTX - AM 970 - Talk/Calypso/Quelbe

==== Frederiksted ====
- WAXJ - 103.5 The Reef - African-American variety
- WDHP - 1620 The Reef - African-American variety
- WLDV - 107.9 Da Vybe - Mainstream urban

== Satellite radio ==
=== Sirius XM Radio ===
==== SiriusXM ====
- XM 3 – Venus – Rhythmic contemporary
- XM 4 – Pitbull's Globalization Radio – Rhythmic Dance
- XM 44 – Hip-Hop Nation – Uncensored Hip-Hop
- XM 45 – Shade 45 – Progressive Hip-Hop and Hardcore Hip-Hop
- XM 46 – BackSpin – Old School Hip-Hop
- XM 47 – The Heat – Mainstream urban
- XM 48 – Heart & Soul – Urban adult contemporary
- XM 49 – Soul Town – Classic Soul
- XM 50 – The Groove – Old School Funk and R&B
- XM 64 – Praise – Urban contemporary gospel
- XM 141 – HUR – Talk, Urban contemporary
- XM 163 – "WGCI" – Urban contemporary

==== XM ====
- XM 32 – Spirit – Urban contemporary gospel
- XM 60 – Soul Town – Classic Soul
- XM 61 – The Flow – Neo-Soul (online only)
- XM 62 – Heart & Soul – Urban adult contemporary
- XM 64 – The Groove – Old-School Funk and R&B
- XM 65 – BackSpin – Classic Hip hop
- XM 66 – Shade 45 – Uncensored Hip hop
- XM 67 – Hip-Hop Nation – Mainstream urban
- XM 68 – The Heat – Urban contemporary
- XM 163 – "WGCI" – Urban contemporary
- XM 168 – The Power – Urban Talk

==== Sirius ====
- XS 40 – Hip-Hop Nation – Mainstream urban
- XS 43 – BackSpin – Old-school hip hop
- XS 45 – Shade 45 – Progressive Hip hop
- XS 50 – The Heat – Urban contemporary
- XS 51 – Heart & Soul – R&B
- XS 53 – Soul Town – Classic Soul
- XS 67 – Praise – Urban contemporary gospel
