= WWKZ (disambiguation) =

WWKZ is a radio station (103.9 FM) licensed to Okolona, Mississippi.

WWKZ may also refer to:

- WACR-FM, a radio station (105.3 FM) licensed to Columbus, Mississippi, which held the call sign WWKZ from 1998 to 2005
- WRBO, a radio station (103.5 FM) licensed to Como, Mississippi, which held the call sign WWKZ from 1984 to 1998
