= WAGF =

WAGF may refer to:

- WAGF-FM, a radio station (101.3 FM) licensed to serve Dothan, Alabama, United States
- WDSA, a radio station (1320 AM) licensed to serve Dothan, Alabama, which held the call sign WAGF from 1932 to 1983 and from 1985 to 2018
- Assemblies of God, officially the World Assemblies of God Fellowship
