= WTUP =

WTUP may refer to:

- WTUP (AM), a radio station (1490 AM) licensed to serve Tupelo, Mississippi, United States
- WTUP-FM, a radio station (99.3 FM) licensed to serve Guntown, Mississippi
