= KWSK =

KWSK may refer to:

- KWSK-LP, a low-power radio station (95.7 FM) licensed to Cason, Texas, United States
- KAZE, a radio station (106.9 FM) licensed to Ore City, Texas, United States, which held the call sign KWSK from October 1989 to November 1999
