= WJSU =

WJSU could refer to two broadcast stations in the United States:

- WGWW, a television station which broadcasts on channel 9 digital/virtual channel 40 licensed to Anniston, Alabama and served the Central Alabama market which used the WJSU-TV callsign from 1984 to 2015
- WJSU-FM, a radio station broadcasting at 88.5 MHz on the FM band, licensed to Jackson, Mississippi.
