= WJJN =

WJJN may refer to:

- WJJN-LD, a low-power television station (channel 20, virtual 49) licensed to serve Dothan, Alabama, United States
- WJJN (FM), a radio station (92.1 FM) licensed to serve Columbia, Alabama
