= WNPT (disambiguation) =

WNPT may refer to:

- WNPT, a television station (virtual channel 8) licensed to Nashville, Tennessee, United States, using the callsign WNPT since 2000
- WFMA (FM), a radio station (102.9 FM) licensed to Marion, Alabama, United States, which held the call sign WNPT-FM from 1989 to 2018
- WMXB, a radio station (1280 AM), licensed to Eutaw, Alabama, United States, which formerly held the call sign WNPT (1951-1993)
