= WMMT =

WMMT may refer to:

- WMMT (FM), a radio station (88.7 FM) licensed to Whitesburg, Kentucky, United States
- WUGM-LP, a low-power radio station (106.1 FM) licensed to Muskegon, Michigan, United States, which held the call sign WMMT-LP from 2001 to 2017
- Wangan Midnight Maximum Tune, an arcade racing game
