= WRRA (AM) =

Radio station in Frederiksted, U.S. Virgin Islands

- Frederiksted, U.S. Virgin Islands; United States
- Broadcast area: St. Croix; Frederiksted
- Frequency: 1290 kHz

Ownership
- Owner: Reef Broadcasting, Inc.
- Sister stations: WDHP; WAXJ

History
- First air date: 1977
- Last air date: 2011

Technical information
- Facility ID: 55468
- Class: D
- Power: 500 watts (day); 290 watts (night)
- Transmitter coordinates: 17°43′28″N 64°53′3″W

Links
- Website: www.reefbroadcasting.com

WRRA (1290 AM) was a radio station formerly licensed to serve Frederiksted, U.S. Virgin Islands. The station was owned by Reef Broadcasting, Inc. It aired a gospel music format. It operated from 1977 to 2011.

== Programming ==
In addition to its regular programming, this station aired the "dLife Diabetes Minute" health advisory program.

== History ==
In 1969 an application was filed for a new station in Frederiksted, U.S. Virgin Islands, initially for 1090 kHz, which was modified to specify 1290 kHz in 1974. The station began broadcasting, as WRRA, in 1977.

=== Expanded Band assignment ===
On March 17, 1997, the Federal Communications Commission (FCC) announced that 88 stations had been given permission to move to newly available "Expanded Band" transmitting frequencies, ranging from 1610 to 1700 kHz, with WRRA authorized to move from 1280 to 1620 kHz.

An application for a construction permit for the expanded band station, also in Frederiksted, was filed on June 13, 1997, which was assigned the call letters WDHP on March 6, 1998. The FCC's initial policy was that both the original station and its expanded band counterpart could operate simultaneously for up to five years, after which owners would have to turn in one of the two licenses, depending on whether they preferred the new assignment or elected to remain on the original frequency, although this deadline was extended multiple times.

It was ultimately decided to end operations at the original station, and on February 8, 2011, the license for WRRA on 1290 kHz was cancelled.
