= WQZZ =

WQZZ may refer to:

- WQZZ (FM), a radio station (107.3 FM) licensed to serve Boligee, Alabama, United States
- WWPG, a radio station (104.3 FM) licensed to serve Eutaw, Alabama, which held the call sign WQZZ from 1997 to 2010
