= WDIG =

WDIG may refer to:

- Walt Disney Internet Group
- WDIG (AM), a radio station (1450 AM) licensed to serve Dothan, Alabama, United States
- WIXZ, a radio station (950 AM) licensed to serve Steubenville, Ohio, United States, which held the call sign WDIG from 1987 to 2018
- Wdig is the Welsh-language name for the community of Goodwick in Wales
