= KIXK (disambiguation) =

KIXK is a radio station in Wailuku, Hawaii, United States.

Other broadcast stations have used this call sign:

- 102.3 MHz in Merkel, Texas (1984–1985), now KHXS
- 96.1 MHz in El Dorado, Arkansas (1986–1991), now KMRX
- 102.7 MHz in Canton, South Dakota (1991–1997), now KYBB
- 99.3 MHz in Linden and White Oak, Texas (1997–2004), now KAPW
- 96.1 MHz in Dalhart, Texas (2008–2010), now KBEX (FM)
- 102.3 MHz in Wheatland, Missouri (2010–2018), deleted as KIXK
