= WCAA =

WCAA may refer to:

- WCAA-LP, a radio station (107.3 FM) licensed to serve Albany, New York, United States
- WXNY-FM, a radio station (96.3 FM) licensed to serve New York, New York, which held the call sign WCAA in 2009
- WQXR-FM, a radio station (105.9 FM) licensed to serve Newark, New Jersey, United States, which held the call sign WCAA from 1998 to 2007 and from 2007 to 2009
- Western Collegiate Athletic Association
