= WWKZ =

Radio station in Okolona, Mississippi

Coordinates: 34.205°N 88.697°W

- Okolona, Mississippi; United States
- Broadcast area: Tupelo, Mississippi
- Frequency: 103.9 MHz
- Branding: KZ103

Programming
- Format: Top 40 (CHR)
- Affiliations: Premiere Networks; Westwood One

Ownership
- Owner: iHeartMedia, Inc.; (iHM Licenses, LLC)
- Sister stations: WESE, WKMQ, WTUP, WTUP-FM, WWZD-FM

History
- Former frequencies: 103.5, 105.3

Technical information
- Licensing authority: FCC
- Facility ID: 64364
- Class: C2
- ERP: 50,000 watts
- HAAT: 120 meters (390 ft)

Links
- Public license information: Public file; LMS
- Webcast: Listen Live
- Website: kz103.iheart.com

WWKZ (103.9 FM, KZ 103), is a top 40 (CHR) radio station licensed to Okolona, Mississippi, and is owned by iHeartMedia, Inc., through licensee iHM Licenses, LLC. WWKZ serves Tupelo and Northeast Mississippi with an ERP of 50,000 watts.

== History ==
WWKZ began broadcasting in 1983 on 103.5 FM until June 1998, when the license was moved to Como to serve the Memphis market as WRBO. WWKZ's owners then moved the Top 40 format to 105.3 WWZQ-FM, and the station became "KZ105". After the frequency change, WWKZ did not have the coverage area it once had, and it remained at 105.3 FM until about mid-2005 when WWKZ and WACR (103.9 now at 105.3) swapped frequencies. WWKZ once again became KZ103 and uses the slogan "Today's Best Music @ 103.9FM".

== Former programming ==
WWKZ was an affiliate of "The Rockin' America Top 30 Countdown" with Scott Shannon in the 1980s.
