= WKMQ =

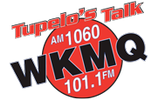
- Tupelo, Mississippi; United States
- Broadcast area: Tupelo
- Frequency: 1060 kHz
- Branding: Tupelo's Talk AM 1060 101.1 FM

Programming
- Format: Talk radio
- Affiliations: Fox News Radio; Compass Media Networks; Premiere Networks

Ownership
- Owner: iHeartMedia, Inc.; (iHM Licenses, LLC)
- Sister stations: WESE, WTUP, WTUP-FM, WWKZ, WWZD-FM

History
- First air date: 1973
- Former call signs: WTLE (1971–1972); WJLJ (1972–1982); WXOQ (1982–1983); WCFB (1983–1990); WPMX (1990–1994); WWZD (1994–1995); WNRX (1995–2000)

Technical information
- Licensing authority: FCC
- Facility ID: 68351
- Class: D
- Power: 960 watts (day); 12 watts (night)
- Transmitter coordinates: 34°15′18″N 88°41′24″W
- Translator: 101.1 W266BC (Tupelo)

Links
- Public license information: Public file; LMS
- Webcast: Listen live (via iHeartRadio)
- Website: newstalkwkmq.iheart.com

WKMQ (1060 AM) is a radio station broadcasting a talk format. Licensed to Tupelo, Mississippi, United States, the station serves the Tupelo area. The station is owned by iHeartMedia, Inc., through licensee iHM Licenses, LLC, and features programming from Fox News Radio, Compass Media Networks, and Premiere Networks.

== History ==
The station went on the air in 1973 with the call letters WJLJ. It ran a top 40 and a country format during the early 1980s. In the mid-1980s, the station changed to a contemporary Christian music station as "Christian Radio 1060 WCFB".

After a change in ownership, the station changed to urban/R&B Format as "PowerMix 1060" with the call letters WPMX on November 30, 1990, which was the beginning of the urban/R&B format in the Tupelo area, which then transferred to WESE (92.5 FM) and evolved into "92.5 JAMZ" and currently "92.5 The Beat".

On April 18, 1994, the station changed its call sign to WWZD and simulcast its sister station WWZD-FM "Wizard 106.7".

On November 1, 1995, the station became news/talk with call letters WNRX, and on May 1, 2000, to the current WKMQ.

== FM translator ==
In addition to the main station on the frequency of 1060 kHz, WKMQ is relayed on an FM translator which covers most of the Tupelo city limits.

Broadcast translator for WKMQ
Call sign	Frequency	City of license	FID	ERP (W)	HAAT	Class	FCC info
W266BC	101.1 FM	Tupelo, Mississippi	140567	250	26.2 m (86 ft)	D	LMS
