= WWZD-FM =

Coordinates: 34.485°N 88.901°W

- New Albany, Mississippi; United States
- Broadcast area: Tupelo, Mississippi
- Frequency: 106.7 MHz
- Branding: Wizard 106.7

Programming
- Format: Country
- Affiliations: Premiere Networks

Ownership
- Owner: iHeartMedia; (iHM Licenses, LLC)
- Sister stations: WESE, WKMQ, WTUP, WTUP-FM, WWKZ

History
- Call sign meaning: "Wizard"

Technical information
- Licensing authority: FCC
- Facility ID: 68354
- Class: C2
- ERP: 28,000 watts
- HAAT: 200 meters (660 ft)

Links
- Public license information: Public file; LMS
- Webcast: Listen Live
- Website: wizard106.iheart.com

WWZD-FM (106.7 MHz, "Wizard 106.7") is a country music formatted radio station based in New Albany, Mississippi, and serving Tupelo and Northeast Mississippi with an ERP of 28,000 watts. WWZD is owned by iHeartMedia, Inc., through licensee iHM Licenses, LLC.
