= WQXR =

WQXR is a service brand operated by New York Public Radio. It may also refer to:

- WQXR-FM, a radio station (105.9 FM) licensed in Newark, New Jersey, serving the New York City metropolitan area
- WFME (AM), a radio station (1560 AM) licensed to serve New York, New York, United States, which held the WQXR call sign from December 1936 to November 1992
- WXNY-FM, a radio station (96.3 FM) licensed to serve New York, New York, which held the call sign WQXR-FM from 1945 to 2009
