= WXNY =

WXNY may refer to:

- WXNY-FM, a radio station (96.3 FM) licensed to serve New York, New York, United States
- WXNY-LD, a low-power digital television station (channel 23, virtual 32) licensed to serve New York, New York
