= WDWG =

Radio station in Rocky Mount, North Carolina

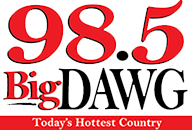
- Rocky Mount, North Carolina; United States
- Broadcast area: Rocky Mount, North Carolina
- Frequency: 98.5 MHz
- Branding: 98.5 Big DAWG

Programming
- Format: Country
- Affiliations: United Stations Radio Networks

Ownership
- Owner: First Media Radio, LLC
- Sister stations: WPWZ, WRMT, WZAX

History
- First air date: 1990
- Former call signs: WSAY-FM (1989–2003)
- Call sign meaning: "Dawg"

Technical information
- Licensing authority: FCC
- Facility ID: 54861
- Class: C3
- ERP: 25,000 watts
- HAAT: 125 meters (410 ft)
- Transmitter coordinates: 35°54′43.6″N 77°50′4.9″W

Links
- Public license information: Public file; LMS
- Webcast: Listen live
- Website: www.bigdawg985.com

WDWG (98.5 FM) is a radio station broadcasting a country format. Licensed to Rocky Mount, North Carolina, United States, it serves the Rocky Mount area. The station is currently owned by First Media Radio, LLC.

== History ==
The former owners of WFMA signed on WSAY-FM "98.5 Down East Country" in 1990. From 1998 through 2004 it was classic country. First Media Radio, LLC changed WSAY to WDWG "The Big Dawg" and tripled the audience.
