= WUVS-LP =

Coordinates: 43.218°N 86.245°W

- Muskegon, Michigan; United States
- Frequency: 103.7 MHz
- Branding: 103.7 The Beat

Programming
- Format: Urban/Educational

Ownership
- Owner: West Michigan Community Help Network
- Sister stations: WUGM-LP

History
- First air date: March 2002
- Call sign meaning: Underground VideoS how

Technical information
- Licensing authority: FCC
- Facility ID: 125796
- Class: L1
- ERP: 100 watts
- HAAT: 29.49 meters (97 ft)

Links
- Public license information: LMS
- Website: 1037thebeat.com

WUVS-LP (103.7 FM, "103.7 The Beat") is a low power radio station licensed to Muskegon, Michigan.

Former logo

== Sources ==
- Michiguide.com - WUVS-LP History
