= WMPZ =

Radio station in Harrison–Chattanooga, Tennessee

Coordinates: 35.126°N 85.290°W

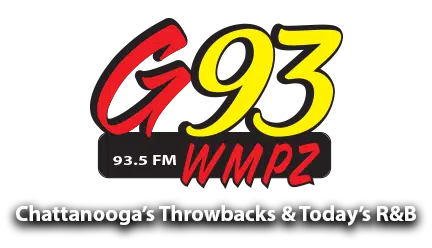

Harrison, Tennessee; United States
- Broadcast area: Chattanooga, Tennessee
- Frequency: 93.5 MHz
- Branding: G93

Programming
- Format: Urban adult contemporary

Ownership
- Owner: Brewer Media
- Sister stations: WJTT

History
- First air date: 1994 (at 93.7)
- Former frequencies: 93.7 MHz (1994-?)

Technical information
- Licensing authority: FCC
- Facility ID: 60653
- Class: A
- ERP: 6,000 watts horizontal 5,880 watts vertical
- HAAT: 96 meters (315 ft)

Links
- Public license information: Public file; LMS
- Webcast: Listen Live
- Website: g93wmpz.com

WMPZ (93.5 FM) is a commercial radio station located in Harrison, Tennessee, broadcasting to the Chattanooga, Tennessee area. WMPZ airs an urban adult contemporary music format branded as "G93", and is owned by Brewer Media. Its studios are located just south of downtown Chattanooga, and its transmitter is located in Red Bank.

WMPZ's previous formats included Urban Oldies, Gospel, & Smooth Jazz.

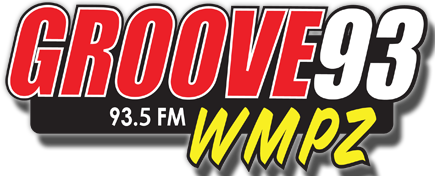
Logo as Groove 93.

On January 4, 2022, the station rebranded as "G93" and replaced the syndicated Tom Joyner Morning Show, which it had carried for more than a decade, with The Rickey Smiley Morning Show.
