= WMSU =

Radio station in Starkville, Mississippi

- Artesia, Mississippi; United States
- Broadcast area: West Point-Columbus, Mississippi
- Frequency: 92.1 MHz (HD Radio)
- Branding: Power 92 Jamz

Programming
- Format: Urban contemporary

Ownership
- Owner: URBan Radio Broadcasting; (GTR Licenses, LLC)
- Sister stations: WACR-FM, WAJV

History
- First air date: 1981
- Call sign meaning: Starkville is the home of Mississippi State University

Technical information
- Licensing authority: FCC
- Facility ID: 10349
- Class: A
- ERP: 4300 watts
- HAAT: 152 meters (499 ft)
- Transmitter coordinates: 33.430°N 88.755°W

Links
- Public license information: Public file; LMS
- Website: power92jamz.net

WMSU (92.1 FM) is a radio station licensed to Artesia, Mississippi, United States, with an urban contemporary format. The station is owned by URBan Radio Broadcasting, through licensee GTR Licenses, LLC, and serves the Starkville, West Point and Columbus area. Although they are listed in Arbitron as Rhythmic, its music is mostly hit-driven Hip-Hop but does target a broad multicultural audience.
