= WTUP-FM =

Coordinates: 34.363°N 88.591°W

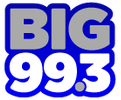
- Guntown, Mississippi; United States
- Broadcast area: Tupelo and northeast Mississippi area
- Frequency: 99.3 MHz
- Branding: Big 99.3

Programming
- Format: Classic hits
- Affiliations: Premiere Networks

Ownership
- Owner: iHeartMedia, Inc.; (iHM Licenses, LLC)
- Sister stations: WESE, WKMQ, WTUP, WWKZ, WWZD-FM

History
- First air date: 1976; 50 years ago (as WBIP)
- Former call signs: WBIP-FM (1976–2005); WBVV (2005–2016)
- Call sign meaning: W TUPelo

Technical information
- Licensing authority: FCC
- Facility ID: 71214
- Class: C3
- ERP: 15,500 watts
- HAAT: 128 meters (420 ft)

Links
- Public license information: Public file; LMS
- Webcast: Listen Live
- Website: big993.iheart.com

WTUP-FM (99.3 MHz) is a radio station licensed to serve Guntown, Mississippi, USA, which serves Tupelo and northeast Mississippi with an ERP of 15,500 watts. WTUP-FM is owned by iHeartMedia. The station is the former WBIP-FM.
