= WDHP =

- Frederiksted, U.S. Virgin Islands; United States
- Frequency: 1620 kHz
- Branding: 1620 The Reef

Programming
- Format: Variety format: news, talk, gospel and country
- Affiliations: BBC News

Ownership
- Owner: Reef Broadcasting, Inc.
- Sister stations: WAXJ

History
- First air date: February 7, 2002

Technical information
- Licensing authority: FCC
- Facility ID: 87117
- Class: B
- Power: 10,000 watts (day); 1,000 watts (night)
- Transmitter coordinates: 17°43′28″N 64°53′03″W

Links
- Public license information: Public file; LMS
- Webcast: Listen live
- Website: reefbroadcasting.com

WDHP (1620 AM) is a radio station licensed to serve Frederiksted, U.S. Virgin Islands. The station is owned by Reef Broadcasting, Inc. It airs a variety of news, talk, gospel music, and country music.

== Programming ==
WDHP currently airs a mix of Reggae, Calypso, Soca, R&B, Latin, Country & Western music, talk and news. In addition to its regular programming, this station airs the "dLife Diabetes Minute" health advisory program.

== History ==
WDHP began as the "expanded band" twin to station WRRA in Frederiksted. On March 17, 1997, the Federal Communications Commission (FCC) announced that 88 stations had been given permission to move to newly available "Expanded Band" transmitting frequencies, ranging from 1610 to 1700 kHz, with WRRA authorized to move from 1290 to 1620 kHz.

An application for a construction permit for the expanded band station was filed on June 13, 1997, which was assigned the call letters WDHP on March 6, 1998. The FCC's initial policy was that both the original station and its expanded band counterpart could operate simultaneously for up to five years, after which owners would have to turn in one of the two licenses, depending on whether they preferred the new assignment or elected to remain on the original frequency, although this deadline was extended multiple times.

It was ultimately decided to end operations at the original station, and on February 8, 2011 the license for WRRA on 1290 kHz was cancelled.
