= WPWZ =

Radio station in Pinetops–Rocky Mount, North Carolina

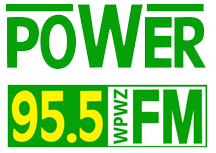
- Pinetops, North Carolina; United States
- Broadcast area: Rocky Mount, North Carolina
- Frequency: 95.5 MHz
- Branding: "Power 95-5"

Programming
- Format: Urban contemporary
- Affiliations: Premiere Networks; United Stations Radio Networks

Ownership
- Owner: First Media Radio, LLC
- Sister stations: WDWG, WRMT, WZAX

History
- First air date: 1997
- Former call signs: WWRT (1990–1996); WEQQ (1996–1998); WKTC (1998–2003)

Technical information
- Licensing authority: FCC
- Facility ID: 74222
- Class: C3
- ERP: 25,000 watts
- HAAT: 140 meters (460 ft)
- Transmitter coordinates: 35°56′45.6″N 77°39′35.9″W

Links
- Public license information: Public file; LMS
- Webcast: Listen live
- Website: www.powerhits95.com

WPWZ (95.5 FM) is a radio station broadcasting an urban contemporary format. Licensed to Pinetops, North Carolina, United States, it serves the Rocky Mount area. The station is owned by First Media Radio.

== History ==
WEQQ signed on in the 1990s, simulcasting the hot adult contemporary music WEQR. The station picked up the country music format and WKTC call letters of what is now WPLW-FM in 1998. In late 2003, the station played Christmas music and then became WPWZ "Power 95.5 FM", playing mainstream urban music by artists such as Beyoncé, Marvin Gaye and Ludacris, while WDWG took over the country music format. Starting in 2004, they began to play R&B all day as well as the Russ Parr Morning Show until 2006 when they switched to the Steve Harvey Morning Show.
