= WFMI =

- Southern Shores, North Carolina; United States
- Broadcast area: Elizabeth City-Nags Head; Hampton Roads, Virginia
- Frequency: 100.9 MHz
- Branding: Rejoice! 100.9

Programming
- Format: Urban gospel

Ownership
- Owner: Communications Systems, Inc.
- Sister stations: WSTK

History
- First air date: 2003

Technical information
- Licensing authority: FCC
- Facility ID: 12733
- Class: C2
- ERP: 39,000 watts
- HAAT: 148 meters
- Transmitter coordinates: 36°12′10″N 75°52′23″W

Links
- Public license information: Public file; LMS
- Webcast: Listen Live
- Website: rejoice1009.com

WFMI (100.9 FM, "Rejoice! 100.9") is a radio station broadcasting an urban gospel format from the Rejoice! Musical Soul Food satellite feed. Licensed to Southern Shores, North Carolina, United States, it serves Northeast North Carolina along with the Hampton Roads, Virginia area. The station is currently owned by Communications Systems, Inc.

Former logo
