= WESE =

Coordinates: 34.363°N 88.591°W

- Baldwyn, Mississippi; United States
- Broadcast area: Tupelo, Mississippi
- Frequency: 92.5 MHz
- Branding: 92.5 The Beat

Programming
- Format: Urban contemporary
- Affiliations: Premiere Networks

Ownership
- Owner: iHeartMedia, Inc.; (iHM Licenses, LLC)
- Sister stations: WKMQ, WTUP, WTUP-FM, WWKZ, WWZD-FM

History
- First air date: 1982

Technical information
- Licensing authority: FCC
- Facility ID: 68352
- Class: C3
- ERP: 12,000 watts
- HAAT: 144 meters (472 ft)

Links
- Public license information: Public file; LMS
- Webcast: Listen Live
- Website: beat925.iheart.com

WESE (92.5 FM), known as "92.5 The Beat", is an urban contemporary radio station based in Baldwyn, Mississippi, United States, and serves Tupelo and Northeast Mississippi with an ERP of 12,000 watts. WESE is owned by iHeartMedia, Inc., through licensee iHM Licenses, LLC.
