= WZAX =

Radio station in Nashville, North Carolina

- Nashville, North Carolina; United States
- Broadcast area: Rocky Mount–Wilson
- Frequency: 99.3 MHz
- Branding: 99.3 the Beach

Programming
- Format: Beach music
- Affiliations: Premiere Networks; Carolina Panthers Radio Network

Ownership
- Owner: First Media Radio, LLC
- Sister stations: WDWG, WPWZ, WRMT

History
- First air date: February 1, 1997
- Former frequencies: 99.7 MHz (1997–2005)

Technical information
- Licensing authority: FCC
- Facility ID: 76264
- Class: A
- ERP: 6,000 watts
- HAAT: 100 meters (330 ft)
- Transmitter coordinates: 35°57′01″N 77°57′26″W

Links
- Public license information: Public file; LMS
- Webcast: Listen Live
- Website: 993thebeach.com

WZAX (99.3 FM) is a commercial FM radio station licensed to Nashville, North Carolina, and serving the Rocky Mount-Wilson area, east of Raleigh. The station airs a beach music format and is owned by First Media Radio, LLC. During football season, it carries the Carolina Panthers.

New for 2026, The Wilson Warbirds, the Single A team of the Milwaukee Brewers will have all home games covered on 99.3. The station's deal is good through the 2028 season.

WZAX has an effective radiated power (ERP) of 6,000 watts as a Class A station. The transmitter is off East Old Spring Road in Nashville.

== History ==
WZAX signed on the air on February 1, 1997. It was owned by Mainquad Communications and the original frequency was 99.7 FM. Its format was hot adult contemporary, known as the "New Mix 99-7".

The playlist included Steve Miller, Jethro Tull, and Rod Stewart. The station previously featured "Dave and Allen in the Morning" with one member of the morning show in Roanoke Rapids and the other in Rocky Mount.

On November 11, 2009, WZAX changed its format to rhythmic oldies, branded as "Jammin' 99.3". That lasted five years.

On November 30, 2014, WZAX dropped its "Jammin' 99.3" rhythmic oldies format and began stunting with a wide range of music as "99.3 What's It Gonna Be?" The station launched a classic rock format branded as "99.3 Rock City" on January 5, 2015.

On November 30, 2017, WZAX dropped the "Rock City" branding and began playing Christmas music. On January 1, 2018, WZAX ended the Christmas music and launched a rhythmic hot adult contemporary format, branded as "Movin' 99.3".

On May 1, 2023, WZAX changed to beach music as "99.3 the Beach".

On April 2, 2026, WZAX became the radio flagship station for the Wilson Warbirds baseball team.
