= WEED (AM) =

- Rocky Mount, North Carolina; United States
- Broadcast area: Rocky Mount-Wilson
- Frequency: 1390 kHz
- Branding: Joy 1390

Programming
- Format: Gospel music

Ownership
- Owner: Northstar Broadcasting Corporation
- Sister stations: WRSV

History
- First air date: 1933
- Call sign meaning: Informal term for "tobacco"

Technical information
- Licensing authority: FCC
- Facility ID: 54825
- Class: D
- Power: 5,000 watts day; 30 watts night
- Transmitter coordinates: 35°57′43.55″N 77°49′33.93″W
- Translator: 105.7 W289BL (Rocky Mount)

Links
- Public license information: Public file; LMS

WEED (1390 kHz) is an AM radio station broadcasting a gospel music format. Licensed to Rocky Mount, North Carolina, United States, it serves the Rocky Mount/Wilson area. The station is owned by Northstar Broadcasting Corporation.

== History ==
WEED signed on in Greenville, North Carolina, in 1933, owned by the Wynne family. After moving to Rocky Mount, WEED added an FM station which later became WRSV. Bill Wynne took over the stations from his father and ran them until Charles and Sarah Johnson bought WEED in 1988. Sarah Johnson remained as head of Northstar Broadcasting after her husband's death.

In 1994, WEED began a four-hour Spanish language program called La Pantera. By 2002, La Pantera had become a 24-hour format. Early that year, WEED began airing a Spanish version of the WRAL-TV 6 p.m. newscast. In June 2003, WEED returned to English, with news/talk, keeping La Pantera as a part-time show. On June 1, 2005, WEED changed to Spanish Christian radio.

In 2002, following Hurricane Floyd, WEED applied for and received authorization from the FCC reduce night-time power from 2.5 kW using a three-tower directional antenna to 28 watts non-directional using a single tower for both day and night operation. The FCC application states the middle tower of the three-tower array was destroyed and the tuning and phasing equipment was damaged or destroyed by the hurricane.

In 2009, when it also aired Rocky Mount High School football, WEED was Old School 1390, "your new home for Old School", with an urban adult contemporary format. Other formats included urban contemporary gospel.

During 2011, WEED aired some North Carolina Central University sports events. Also in 2011, WEED changed from "1390 the Word" to "1390 Jammin' Gospel", airing Christian programming including 15-minute programs by pastors, and a variety of music including "urban, bluegrass, Christian country, Southern or gospel blues." Freddie Williams was program director and the only DJ.

== Translator ==
Call sign	Frequency	City of license	FID	ERP (W)	Class	Transmitter coordinates	FCC info
W289BL	105.7 FM	Rocky Mount, North Carolina	87713	250	D	35°58′45.8″N 77°34′35.2″W	LMS
