= WAJV =

- Brooksville, Mississippi; United States
- Broadcast area: Columbus-Starkville-West Point, Tupelo; Aberdeen, Mississippi; Crawford, Mississippi
- Frequency: 98.9 MHz
- Branding: Joy 98.9

Programming
- Format: Gospel music

Ownership
- Owner: URBan Radio Broadcasting; (GTR Licenses, LLC)
- Sister stations: WACR-FM, WMSU

Technical information
- Licensing authority: FCC
- Facility ID: 12229
- Class: C3
- ERP: 13,000 watts
- HAAT: 139.2 meters (457 ft)
- Transmitter coordinates: 33°20′40″N 88°32′47″W

Links
- Public license information: Public file; LMS
- Website: http://www.joy989.com/

WAJV (98.9 FM) is a radio station broadcasting a gospel music format. Licensed to Brooksville, Mississippi, United States, the station serves the Columbus-Starkville-West Point, Tupelo area. The station is owned by Urban Radio Broadcasting, through licensee GTR Licenses, LLC. The station has applied for a construction permit from the U.S. Federal Communications Commission (FCC) for an increase to 13,000 watts effective radiated power.
