= WRMT =

Radio station in Rocky Mount, North Carolina

- Rocky Mount, North Carolina; United States
- Broadcast area: Rocky Mount–Wilson
- Frequency: 1490 kHz

Programming
- Format: Beach music

Ownership
- Owner: First Media Radio, LLC
- Sister stations: WPWZ, WDWG, WZAX

History
- First air date: December 15, 1958
- Call sign meaning: Rocky Mount

Technical information
- Licensing authority: FCC
- Facility ID: 73962
- Class: C
- Power: 1,000 watts
- Transmitter coordinates: 35°55′57″N 77°49′49″W
- Translator: 98.1 W251CX (Rocky Mount)

Links
- Public license information: Public file; LMS

WRMT (1490 AM) is a radio station broadcasting a beach music format. Licensed to Rocky Mount, North Carolina, United States, it serves the Rocky Mount area. The station is owned by First Media Radio, LLC.

== History ==
Logo as a Fox Sports Radio affiliate

In 2005, this station was ESPN Radio 1490 and aired high school sports. WRMT briefly aired gospel programming originating from Praise City Church.

In 2018, WRMT once again began to broadcast Rocky Mount High School football games.

On February 14, 2020, WRMT became 1490 "The Beach", playing Carolina beach music.
