= WDPW =

Coordinates: 43.087°N 85.316°W

- Greenville, Michigan; United States
- Frequency: 91.9 MHz
- Branding: Power 91.9

Programming
- Format: Urban contemporary gospel

Ownership
- Owner: Larlen Communications Inc.; (Larlen Communications Inc.)

History
- Call sign meaning: PoweR

Technical information
- Licensing authority: FCC
- Facility ID: 121790
- Class: A
- ERP: 4,000 watts
- HAAT: 63 meters

Links
- Public license information: Public file; LMS
- Website: power919.org

WDPW (91.9 FM), better known as Power 91.9 "The People's Choice", broadcasts an Urban contemporary gospel format that serves the Grand Rapids, Michigan market. WDPW 91.9 FM went on the air officially in November 2009. The station broadcasts at 4,000 watts of power. It is licensed to nearby Greenville, MI. Power 91.9 WDPW is owned by Larlen Communications.

== Sources ==
WDPW on FCCInfo.com
