= WJTT =

Coordinates: 35.126°N 85.290°W

Red Bank, Tennessee; United States
- Broadcast area: Chattanooga, Tennessee
- Frequency: 94.3 MHz
- Branding: "Power 94"

Programming
- Format: Mainstream urban

Ownership
- Owner: Brewer Media
- Sister stations: WMPZ

History
- First air date: 1970
- Former call signs: WSIM-FM (1970–1981)
- Call sign meaning: We're JeTT (Former slogan from their CHUrban era in the 1980s through the 2000s)

Technical information
- Licensing authority: FCC
- Facility ID: 6752
- Class: A
- ERP: 4,700 watts
- HAAT: 113 meters (371 ft)

Links
- Public license information: Public file; LMS
- Webcast: Listen Live
- Website: power94.com

WJTT (94.3 FM) is a radio station serving the Chattanooga area. The station operates a mainstream urban format and is branded as Power 94. It is owned by Brewer Media and is licensed to Red Bank, Tennessee. Its studios are located just south of downtown Chattanooga, and its transmitter is located in Red Bank.

== History ==
WSIM-FM was licensed in the Chattanooga, Tennessee area, and it was physically located in Red Bank, Tennessee. Owned by Roberta Davis, WSIM operated first as a true album-oriented station. Anything was playable, except country, bluegrass, and any songs that would violate FCC regulations. In the mid- to late-1970s, WSIM provided a format that concentrated on new music at the time. It was the first station in Chattanooga to play Jackson Browne's "Running On Empty", as well as Elvis Costello's "My Aim Is True".

The station also supported the local music community. On Memorial Day 1978, WSIM sponsored a concert on Lake Chickamauga, featuring female rock singer-songwriter Marshall Chapman. Expecting approximately 1,000 attendees to show up at the beach by Chickamauga Dam, the station was surprised by as many as 10,000 (estimate according to the Chattanooga Times). When the station planned a July 4 concert featuring the Bill Blue Band and Gene Cotten, the Coast Guard served the station with a warning that they would not be allowed to present the concert. Instead, the station broadcast the concert live from its studios. Other live from the studio events included interviews and music with Charlie Daniels, the Nighthawks, Delbert McClinton, Longdancer, and others.

In early 1978, WFLI purchased the station and its license. Immediately upon taking control, the new ownership began to change into an AOR format, a heavily formatted and controlled approach to music. In 1979, the station began simulcasting WFLI's broadcast, effectively ending WSIM's free-form radio reputation.

The licensed facility that was WSIM in the 1970s is now WJTT which is started it out as a Contemporary Hit Radio/Urban Contemporary hybrid a.k.a. CHUrban format in March 1981 under their new moniker as "The Rhythm of the City! The New Jet 94 FM". And then in the 1990s WJTT became "The All New Power 94 FM". Since then, WJTT has been the preferred choice for Chattanooga's African American music programming for 40 years. In 2011, the FCC granted WJTT a construction permit for an upgrade from Class A to Class C3, thus increasing its effective radiated power from 4.7 kW to 19.5 kW and an expanded coverage beyond the Chattanooga area.
