= KAPW =

Radio station in White Oak, Texas

- White Oak, Texas; United States
- Broadcast area: Tyler-Longview area
- Frequency: 99.3 MHz
- Branding: Mega 99.3

Programming
- Language: Spanish
- Format: Regional Mexican

Ownership
- Owner: Reynolds Radio, Inc.
- Sister stations: KBLZ; KAZE

History
- First air date: June 1, 1997
- Former call signs: KIXK (1997–2004); KLBL (2004–2005); KVEE (2005–2007); KAJK (2007–2009); KZTK (2009–2013)
- Call sign meaning: Power (former branding)

Technical information
- Licensing authority: FCC
- Facility ID: 78631
- Class: C2
- ERP: 34,000 watts
- HAAT: 165 meters (541 ft)
- Transmitter coordinates: 32°35′17.00″N 94°58′53.00″W

Links
- Public license information: Public file; LMS
- Website: mega993.com

KAPW (99.3 FM) is a radio station licensed to White Oak, Texas, United States. The station serves the Tyler-Longview-Marshall area, broadcasting a Regional Mexican format. The station is currently owned by Reynolds Radio, Inc.

KAPW's studios are located on Old Grande Boulevard, south of downtown Tyler. The transmitter is located northwest of Gladewater.

== History ==
The station was assigned the call sign KIXK on June 1, 1997. KIXK was originally licensed to Linden, Texas. KIXK was usually silent. From 1999 until 2002, KIXK would periodically return to the air to test its facilities and broadcast easy listening music from its tower near Linden. KIXK broadcast more regularly from Fall 2001 to Spring 2002. During this timeframe the music varied with adult contemporary, classic hits, and country. KIXK then switched city of license from Linden to White Oak and transferred broadcasting facilities to a new tower so that it could cover the Tyler/Longview radio market. In March 2002, KIXK signed on full time and launched a Country format known as "the Bull." February 15, 2004, the station changed its call sign to KLBL. Several times after that, the call sign was changed: 08-15-2005 to KVEE; 02-22-2007 to KAJK; 04-29-2009 to KZTK; and 07-23-2013 to the current KAPW.

In August 2005, KLBL dropped its Country format and began stunting with "1999" by Prince played on loop for a week. The last song "the Bull" played was "Goodbye Says It All" by Blackhawk. This led to the launch of a Rhythmic Adult Contemporary format as V-99.3. This format lasted until March 2007 when it was dropped for Adult Hits "Jack-FM", which was from the "Jack-FM" national feed. In Spring 2009, the station switched to a talk format as "99.3 Talk FM" with the KZTK call letters.

On February 15, 2013, KZTK dropped its talk format and began stunting. The next day (February 16), KZTK launched a contemporary hit radio format, branded as "Power 99.3". The first song played on Power 99.3 was "Scream & Shout" by will.i.am and Britney Spears. In Fall 2014, 99.3 (now KAPW) flipped to a Spanish adult contemporary format as "Mega 99.3." Eventually, KAPW changed to a Regional Mexican format but kept the "Mega" name.
