= WKZK =

Radio station in North Augusta, South Carolina

- North Augusta, South Carolina; United States
- Broadcast area: Augusta metropolitan area / Central Savannah River Area
- Frequency: 1600 kHz
- Branding: The Spirit 103.7 FM & 1600 AM

Programming
- Format: Urban gospel

Ownership
- Owner: Gospel Radio Inc.

History
- First air date: May 9, 1962; 64 years ago
- Former call signs: WFNL (1962-6/12/1979)

Technical information
- Licensing authority: FCC
- Facility ID: 24696
- Class: D
- Power: 4,000 watts days 27 watts nights
- Transmitter coordinates: 33°29′37″N 81°59′52″W
- Translators: 98.9 W255AS (Augusta); 103.7 W279BY (Augusta); 104.7 W284DJ (Augusta)

Links
- Public license information: Public file; LMS
- Webcast: Listen Live
- Website: wkzk.net

WKZK (1600 kHz) is a commercial AM radio station licensed to North Augusta, South Carolina. It serves the Augusta metropolitan area and Central Savannah River Area. WKZK broadcasts an urban gospel radio format and is owned by Gosepl Radio, Inc. The studios are on Milledge Road in Augusta.

By day, WKZK is powered at 4,000 watts. But at night, to protect other stations on 1600 AM from interference, WKZK greatly reduces power to 27 watts. It uses a non-directional antenna. Programming is also heard on three FM translators at 98.9, 103.7 and 104.7 MHz in Augusta.
