= WDIG (AM) =

- Dothan, Alabama; United States
- Frequency: 1450 kHz

Programming
- Format: Oldies
- Affiliations: ABC News Radio

Ownership
- Owner: Larry Williams

History
- First air date: April 30, 1947
- Former call signs: WDIG (1947–1979); WWNT (1979–2014); WDYG (2014–2019)

Technical information
- Licensing authority: FCC
- Facility ID: 17461
- Class: C
- Power: 1,000 watts unlimited
- Transmitter coordinates: 31°13′10″N 85°22′14″W
- Translator: 102.1 W271DN (Dothan)

Links
- Public license information: Public file; LMS
- Website: WDIG on Facebook

WDIG (1450 AM) is a radio station broadcasting an oldies format in Dothan, Alabama, United States. The station is owned by Larry Williams. It is also simulcast on FM translator W271DN (102.1 FM) in Dothan.

WDIG is Dothan's second-oldest radio station, signing on in 1947. In its first decade much of its programming came from the ABC Radio Network. Subsequently, it was also an affiliate of the Mutual Broadcasting System. It operated as a Top 40 station in the 1970s before being sold to R. Lamar Trammell, who renamed it WWNT in 1979 and changed its format to Christian radio in 1981. Trammell converted the station to a news/talk format in 1992, with Williams (known on air as Larry McKee) as a local host. Williams bought the station in 2000 and retained the news/talk format until 2014, when it flipped to oldies as WDYG. The WDIG call sign returned to Dothan in 2019 when it became available.

== History ==
WDIG began broadcasting on April 30, 1947. It was owned by Houston Broadcasters, whose two partners, Jess Swicegood and J. P. Burnett, had worked together at a station in Kingsport, Tennessee. The station was affiliated with the ABC Radio Network and operated from facilities on Adams Street. WDIG was the second station to open in Dothan after WAGF, which began in 1933. Initial programming on the station consisted of ABC network advice, comedy, variety, and drama shows, together with some locally produced music shows and news as well as an early-morning farming show. In the early 1950s, the station was still running ABC shows and described its format as "Music – News – Entertainment – Views – Always a program that interests you – All through the day".

By the mid-1950s, the station was airing programming from the Mutual Broadcasting System, including Major League Baseball on Mutual, in addition to that from ABC, and described itself as being for "Variety, music, news, drama, sports and outstanding network programs". The association with Mutual Broadcasting was still active at the end of the decade.

The 250-watt station increased its power to 1,000 watts in 1960. The station was operating for 17 1/2 hours a day at that time; in the decade, Swicegood served on Mutual's affiliates advisory committee. During the 1960s, popular music became a more dominant part of the station's programming. The station's disc jockeys gained a following, especially one named Preston T., who encouraged listeners to honk their horns as they drove by the WDIG studio.

Swicegood sold the station to Margaret Wein in 1970 for $125,000; her husband, Ed Wein, owned a station in Phenix City. The Weins brought new promotional tactics to the station and changed it to a Top 40 format; program director John L. Bates described its previous output as a "no-format mess".

One of the station's ad salesmen, R. Lamar Trammell, teamed with Dothan car dealer Johnny Culpepper to form Early Bird Broadcasting and buy WDIG from Margaret Wein in 1976 for $375,000. Trammell had just joined WDIG from WAGF, where he had been involved nearly continuously since 1939; he had been known as the Early Bird since about 1946 for his morning broadcasting. The call letters were changed in 1979 to WWNT, branded as "2WNT", and the station changed to a Christian radio format in 1981. The format flip was a leap of faith, as the station lacked any Southern gospel albums to play before several listeners donated a total of 350 albums.

WWNT switched to a news/talk format in November or December 1992; the station aired talk shows from national hosts such as Rush Limbaugh, Larry King, and G. Gordon Liddy alongside a local morning show hosted by general manager Larry McKee. McKee, whose real name is Larry Williams, bought the station from Trammell in 2000.

After losing The Rush Limbaugh Show to a larger talk station in the area, Williams opted to change the format of WWNT away from news/talk. He decided to flip the station to oldies, playing the music WDIG once had from the 1950s through the 1970s. The WDIG call sign was not available, so the station became WDYG. It moved to studios in a business incubator on Foster Street in Dothan. In 2019, upon being alerted by a friend in the process of starting WDYG's FM translator that the WDIG call sign was available, he snapped it up and changed WDYG to WDIG.
