= WRSV =

- Elm City, North Carolina; United States
- Broadcast area: Rocky Mount, North Carolina
- Frequency: 92.1 (MHz)
- Branding: "Choice FM 92.1"

Programming
- Format: Mainstream Urban
- Affiliations: The Breakfast Club (Premiere Radio Networks)

Ownership
- Owner: Northstar Broadcasting
- Sister stations: WEED

History
- First air date: 1974
- Call sign meaning: W Rocky Mount Soul Voice

Technical information
- Licensing authority: FCC
- Facility ID: 54823
- Class: A
- ERP: 2,300 watts
- HAAT: 162 meters (531 ft)
- Transmitter coordinates: 35°52′53.9″N 78°4′13.6″W

Links
- Public license information: Public file; LMS
- Webcast: Listen Live (may not work)
- Website: ilovechoicefm.com

WRSV (92.1 MHz) is a commercial FM radio station licensed to Elm City, North Carolina. It is owned by Northstar Broadcasting and airs a Mainstream urban radio format. WRSV uses the branding "Choice FM" and carries the nationally syndicated Breakfast Club in the mornings.

== History ==
WRSV, owned by Northstar Broadcasting, is an African-American family owned Broadcast station. It was started by the late William Avera Wynne, passed to his son William "Billy" Wynne, Jr. and later sold to the station's General Manager Charles O. Johnson, as a result of the great relationship between Wynne and Johnson.

William Avera Wynne, Sr. started WEED radio in 1933, later adding an FM station. In 1974, WEED-FM became WRSV-FM (Rocky Mount's Soul Voice), one of the first stations in North Carolina geared toward African Americans. Bill Wynne took over the stations from his father, later selling to his General Manager Charles O. Johnson, who formed Northstar Broadcasting. Subsequently, Wynne retired in 1989, but was a friend and advisor to Johnson and his family throughout his retirement and remainder of his life.

Charles O. Johnson, got his start in radio in the 1960s hosting programs on gospel and rhythm and blues to the local Rocky Mount audience. His first step with radio was as a janitor. Eventually, he got an announcer's position with a station in Scotland Neck, NC. To further his career, he moved on to station WCEC-WFMA locally. Club 810 became synonymous with Charles O. Johnson, the radio personality. It gave him and identity apart from everyone else locally and allowed him to reach the black audience in a way that had not been done. The program included Charles' unmatched commentary and exceptional music from black artists from everywhere in the country. In 1988, Charles realized a dream he had for many years, Billy Wynne presented the opportunity to arrange a purchase of stations WRSV 92.1 FM and WEED 1390 AM. Both of them operated under the same roof. Charles had been with these stations for a number of years and saw an opportunity to become an owner and general manager.. Johnson spent over 40 years in the broadcasting business serving the African American community. He was inducted into Edgecombe and Nash County's Twin Counties Hall of Fame in 2009.

Charles' passed in 1996 with Northstar Broadcasting and its stations transferring to his wife Sarah and his children Sonya and Charles II "Chuck". Sarah took the helm as President of Northstar Broadcasting. Chuck, at age 24, became the immediate Vice President of Northstar Broadcasting and General Manager of WRSV-FM and WEED-AM and remains the General Manager of both stations today. Chuck was a natural for the task considering his being one of UNC-Chapel Hill's Radio, TV and Motion Picture last graduating class members. Sonya, an IT professional, serves as the stations Corporate Secretary and was one of the first to graduate from the National Association of Broadcasting's Broadcast Leadership Training Program in 2001. Between what the family naturally learned of radio from Charles Sr., along with, Chuck's and Sonya's formal training the stations continue to thrive amongst their corporate competition.

On September 2, 2015, after completing its transmitter move to west of Rocky Mount and shifting markets from Rocky Mount/Greenville to Raleigh-Durham, WRSV rebranded its station from Soul 92 Jams to Choice FM 92.10, and positioned themselves as "The People's Station" maintaining its urban format. Another shift was replacing the Rickey Smiley morning show syndicated by Urban One's Reach Media with The Breakfast Club syndicated by Premiere Radio Networks. Both WRSV and sister station WEED have been market leaders since.
