= Hurban =

Radio format

Hurban is a radio programming format from radio chain giant iHeartMedia and Senior VP Alfredo Alonso. Hurban radio stations target young Hispanics in the United States, primarily consisting of reggaeton, Latin trap, Latin rap, and Latin dance. Advertisements and DJs are usually presented in a mixture of English and Spanish.

The word hurban is a portmanteau of the terms "Hispanic" and "urban."

== Artists ==
Core artists of the hurban format include Daddy Yankee, Don Omar, Julio Voltio and Tego Calderón.

== History ==
KLOL in Houston, Texas debut LATINO & PROUD as the first Hurban formatted radio station in the continental US in late 2004. By 2007, Clear Channel dropped the hurban format and picked up a Spanish Contemporary format. Most of the original personalities have been let go since and the station is no longer bilingual. The only original on-air personality that still remains to this day is Liz Arreola, or Liz de Mega as she is known. Most of the current personalities have been ordered to cease the "Spanglish" act on the air and stick with Spanish.

The format has grown to many other cities, including New York WXNY, Los Angeles KXOL , Denver, Miami, and Albuquerque, NM. But more recently, the format has been replaced in several cities. The list includes Miami, Denver, Albuquerque, Dallas (KZZA), and Las Vegas.

== Development of the hurban ideology ==
The new radio format dubbed "hurban" may seem like it is merely another attempt to profit off of the tastes of a particular ethnic group that has a preference for a given type of music, but this is not the case. These pan-Latin radio stations are embracing reggaeton, hip hop and dancehall music, which largely comprise and explicate hurban thoughts and ideas through their lyrics and styles. Nevertheless, the scope of this music can be comprehended more thoroughly when we understand the movement as a grassroots attempt that will perhaps bring together the pan-Latino movement in the music industry. In relation to the hurban music movement, there are other means by which Hispanic urbans are being encouraged to represent their ethnic background. Clear Channel Communications, a major broadcasting company, announced in fall 2004 that it was transforming 20 to 25 of its 1,200 stations to Hispanic formats over the subsequent 18 months. Some individuals may have felt disappointed when they realized that one of their favorite radio stations was changed in an effort to accommodate the needs of the hurban audience. Tension between musical genres may also exist in subtle commercial competitions such as these with the potential to affect an individual's prejudices that tend to develop in a multi-racial and multi-cultural America. Hurban radio stations may provide the means for the pan-Latino population to develop a sense of communication within the community that will reverberate in America and abroad.

== See also ==
- Reggaeton
- Latin trap
- Latin hip hop
- Latin dance
- Latin Grammy Award for Best Urban Music Album
- Latin Grammy Award for Best Urban Song
- Latin Rhythm Albums
- Latin Rhythm Airplay
