= KBLZ =

Radio station in Winona, Texas

Coordinates: 32.386°N 95.112°W

- Winona, Texas; United States
- Broadcast area: Tyler-Longview area
- Frequency: 102.7 MHz
- Branding: 102-7 & 106-9 The Blaze

Programming
- Language: English
- Format: Rhythmic contemporary

Ownership
- Owner: Reynolds Radio
- Sister stations: KAZE; KAPW

History
- First air date: March 3, 2000
- Call sign meaning: "Blaze" (branding)

Technical information
- Licensing authority: FCC
- Class: C3
- ERP: 9,300 watts
- HAAT: 162 meters (531 ft)
- Repeater: 106.9 KAZE (Ore City)

Links
- Public license information: Public file; LMS
- Webcast: Listen live
- Website: theblaze.fm

KBLZ (102.7 FM) is a radio station licensed to Winona, Texas, United States, and serving Tyler, Texas. It broadcasts a rhythmic contemporary format in full simulcast with its sister station KAZE 106.9 Ore City, which serves the Longview/Marshall portion of the market. "The Blaze" is owned by Reynolds Radio, with studios located on Grande Boulevard, south of downtown Tyler. KBLZ's transmitter is located east of Tyler in unincorporated Smith County.

== History ==
KBLZ received a construction permit in 1998 (as KBKV) and signed in March 2000 with its current call set. KAZE, whose sign-on was in 1989 (as KWSK, licensed previously to Daingerfield), have been simulcasting their format since 1999. This format has a Hip Hop/R&B music lean but also incorporates Rhythmic Pop/Dance into the mix, the only station in Tyler and Longview to do so.
