= WDSA =

- Dothan, Alabama; United States
- Broadcast area: Wiregrass Region
- Frequency: 1320 kHz
- Branding: 1320 Gold

Programming
- Format: Urban Talk
- Affiliations: CNN Radio

Ownership
- Owner: Wilson Broadcasting Co., Inc.
- Sister stations: WAGF-FM, WJJN; TV: WJJN-LD

History
- First air date: 1932
- Former call signs: WAGF (1932–1983); WDBM (1983–1985); WAGF (1985–2018)

Technical information
- Licensing authority: FCC
- Facility ID: 30278
- Class: D
- Power: 1,000 watts (day); 92 watts (night)
- Transmitter coordinates: 31°14′54″N 85°23′20″W
- Translators: W230CY (93.9 MHz, Dothan)

Links
- Public license information: Public file; LMS
- Website: WDSA Online

WDSA (1320 AM, "1320 Gold") is a radio station broadcasting an Urban Talk radio format. WDSA is licensed to serve the community of Dothan, Alabama, United States. The station is currently owned by Wilson Broadcasting Co., Inc. The station was reassigned the WAGF call letters by the Federal Communications Commission on January 1, 1985.

== Programming ==
WDSA features programming from CNN Radio. Notable on-air personalities include Dr. Michael Eric Dyson, the Rev. Al Sharpton, the sports duo 2 Live Stews, and the "gorgeous queen of night time talk" Bev Smith.

== History ==
WDSA went on the air on December 14, 1933, originally with the call letters WHET, and was long billed as the "Voice of the Tri-States." Its studio was located on the top floor of the Houston Hotel, moved to the ground floor, then, in 1935, to East Main Street adjacent to the Martin Hotel and the Young Building. Its transmitter was located at the Dothan Fairgrounds but moved in 1941 to Headland Highway. The station's original owners were Cyril W. Reddoch, Julian Smith, and John Hubbard. Soon, Hubbard bought Reddoch's share, and Fred C. Moseley, the station's commercial manager, bought Reddoch's share from Hubbard in 1935 or 1936. Mosely and Smith bought out Hubbard's interest in WAGF on December 31, 1953, and owned the station until 1976 when they sold the station to Carroll Eddins of Cullman; his daughter and son-in-law, Mary Evelyn and Clark Jones, managed the station. At that time the Jones's moved the studios to the transmitter site. Eddins sold the station in the 1980s to Frank Johnson who owned it until it became unsuccessful, reverted to Eddins, and went dark (date unknown). It stayed for dark several years until revived by Wilson Broadcasting. While owned by Smith and Moseley (a.k.a. Dothan Broadcasting Company) WAGF operated with a small, yet loyal staff.

Lamar "Early Bird" Trammell worked at the station, mostly as morning host, from 1939-1976 with the exception of a military stint during World War II. Trammell was miffed when his longtime employers would not allow him to purchase the station, instead selling it to the Jones family. Trammell left WAGF and bought WDIG, Dothan, from Ed Wein. Among WAGF's former employees are CBS News anchor Douglas Edwards, Sam Hall, Tommy Sabiston, Ted Hall, Ray Smith, Bobby Price (now a sales executive in Dothan), Marv Edwards, Noel Peters, Bob Leslie, Michael Bruner Adams, and Ken Curtis, the longtime news director at WDHN, the ABC television affiliate in Dothan.

The station changed its call sign from WAGF to WDSA on March 1, 2018.
