= KAZE =

Radio station in Ore City, Texas

- Ore City, Texas; United States
- Broadcast area: Longview-Marshall area
- Frequency: 106.9 MHz
- Branding: 102-7 & 106-9 The Blaze

Programming
- Language: English
- Format: Rhythmic contemporary

Ownership
- Owner: Reynolds Radio, Inc.
- Sister stations: KBLZ; KAPW

History
- First air date: October 31, 1989
- Former call signs: KWSK (1989–1998); KKLK (1998–1999)
- Call sign meaning: "Blaze" (branding)

Technical information
- Licensing authority: FCC
- Facility ID: 57262
- Class: C3
- ERP: 8,200 watts
- HAAT: 153.0 meters (502.0 ft)
- Transmitter coordinates: 32°41′54″N 94°37′4″W
- Repeater: 102.7 KBLZ (Winona)

Links
- Public license information: Public file; LMS
- Webcast: Listen live
- Website: theblaze.fm

KAZE (106.9 FM) is a radio station broadcasting a rhythmic contemporary format. Licensed to Ore City, Texas, United States, the station serves the Longview-Marshall area. The station is currently owned by Reynolds Radio, Inc. The station is part of a simulcast with sister station KBLZ, which serves the Tyler side of the market. "The Blaze" studios are located on Grande Boulevard, south of downtown Tyler. KAZE's transmitter is located northwest of Harleton in Harrison County.

== History ==
KAZE began broadcasting as KWSK, licensed to Daingerfield, Texas on October 31, 1989. In 1998, 106.9 switched to a simulcast of hot AC KALK 97.7 as KKLK, "K-Lake." On November 9, 1999, the station changed its call sign to the current KAZE, launching as "102-7 & 106-9 The Blaze". KAZE has remained in simulcast with KBLZ as Rhythmic CHR "The Blaze" ever since, currently celebrating its 21st year of serving East Texas.
