= WWPG =

- Eutaw, Alabama; United States
- Broadcast area: Tuscaloosa, Alabama
- Frequency: 104.3 MHz
- Branding: Q104

Programming
- Format: Urban Adult Contemporary

Ownership
- Owner: Jim Lawson Communications, Inc.
- Sister stations: WMXB

History
- First air date: 1992 (as WIDO)
- Former call signs: WIDO (1988–1993); WQLW (1993–1997); WWQZ (1/97-3/97); WQZZ (1997–2010)

Technical information
- Licensing authority: FCC
- Facility ID: 31145
- Class: A
- ERP: 3,500 watts
- HAAT: 134 meters (440 feet)
- Transmitter coordinates: 32°55′19″N 87°49′08″W

Links
- Public license information: Public file; LMS

WWPG (104.3 FM) is a radio station licensed to serve Eutaw, Alabama, United States. The station is owned by Jim Lawson Communications, Inc. First licensed to broadcast in 1992, WWPG-FM currently airs an urban adult contemporary music format.

== History ==
The Federal Communications Commission granted the original construction permit for this radio station on August 18, 1988. This new station was assigned call letters WIDO on September 27, 1988. The station's license to cover was granted on May 5, 1992.

In August 1992, Grantell Broadcasting Company reached an agreement to sell then-WIDO to Jim Lawson Communications, Inc. The FCC approved the deal on October 23, 1992, and the transaction was consummated on April 2, 1993. The new owners had the station's callsign changed to WQLQ on May 18, 1983. This callsign lasted until another change, this time to WWQZ, on January 13, 1997, which was followed rapidly by another change on March 1, 1997, to WQZZ. The callsign again changed, this time to the current WWPG, on May 18, 2010.
