= WAXJ =

Radio station in Frederiksted, U.S. Virgin Islands

- Frederiksted, U.S. Virgin Islands; United States
- Frequency: 103.5 MHz
- Branding: 103.5 The Reef

Programming
- Format: Urban adult contemporary, reggae

Ownership
- Owner: Reef Broadcasting, Inc.
- Sister stations: WDHP

History
- First air date: January 23, 1998

Technical information
- Licensing authority: FCC
- Facility ID: 8888
- Class: A
- ERP: 6,000 watts
- HAAT: -10 meters (-32 feet)
- Transmitter coordinates: 17°43′28″N 64°53′03″W

Links
- Public license information: Public file; LMS
- Website: http://www.reefbroadcasting.com/

WAXJ (103.5 FM) is a radio station licensed to serve Frederiksted, U.S. Virgin Islands. The station is owned by Reef Broadcasting, Inc. It airs an urban adult contemporary and reggae format.

The station has been assigned these call letters by the Federal Communications Commission since January 23, 1998.

== Programming ==
In addition to its regular programming, this station airs the "dLife Diabetes Minute" health advisory program.
