= WAGF-FM =

Radio station in Dothan, Alabama

- Dothan, Alabama; United States
- Broadcast area: Wiregrass Region
- Frequency: 101.3 MHz
- Branding: 101.3 The Touch

Programming
- Format: Urban adult contemporary

Ownership
- Owner: Wilson Broadcasting Co., Inc.
- Sister stations: WDSA, WJJN, WJJN-LD

History
- First air date: 1991
- Former call signs: WJJN (1991–1996)
- Call sign meaning: Alabama Georgia Florida

Technical information
- Licensing authority: FCC
- Facility ID: 30279
- Class: A
- ERP: 2,500 watts
- HAAT: 163.0 meters (534.8 ft)
- Transmitter coordinates: 31°12′04″N 85°20′04″W

Links
- Public license information: Public file; LMS

WAGF-FM (101.3 FM, "101.3 The Touch") is a radio station broadcasting an urban adult contemporary music format. Licensed to Dothan, Alabama, United States, the station is currently owned by Wilson Broadcasting Co., Inc.

WAGF-FM is also the University of Alabama Crimson Tide sports affiliate, which consists of football, basketball, baseball, and Tide Talk.
