= WUGM-LP =

- Muskegon, Michigan; United States
- Frequency: 106.1 MHz
- Branding: M 106 fm

Programming
- Format: Rhythmic Oldies

Ownership
- Owner: West Michigan Community Help Network
- Sister stations: WUVS-LP

History
- Former call signs: WMMT-LP (2001–2017)

Technical information
- Licensing authority: FCC
- Facility ID: 126334
- Class: L1
- ERP: 100 watts
- HAAT: 28.8 meters (94 feet)
- Transmitter coordinates: 43°14′02″N 86°13′47″W

Links
- Public license information: LMS
- Website: m106fm.com

WUGM-LP (106.1 FM) is a radio station broadcasting a Rhythmic Oldies format, along with specialized Electronic dance music-based programming on the weekends. Licensed to Muskegon, Michigan, United States, the station is currently owned by West Michigan Community Help Network.
