= WMXB =

- Tuscaloosa, Alabama; United States
- Broadcast area: Tuscaloosa metropolitan area
- Frequency: 1280 kHz
- Branding: Mix 107.3

Programming
- Format: Urban adult contemporary

Ownership
- Owner: Jim Lawson Communications, Inc.; (Lawson of Tuscaloosa, Inc.)
- Sister stations: WWPG

History
- First air date: December 10, 1951
- Former call signs: WNPT (1951–1993); WWPG (1993–2010)

Technical information
- Licensing authority: FCC
- Facility ID: 68420
- Class: B
- Power: 5,000 watts (day); 500 watts (night)
- Transmitter coordinates: 33°13′07″N 87°34′05″W
- Translator: 107.3 W297BJ (Tuscaloosa)

Links
- Public license information: Public file; LMS

WMXB (1280 AM, "Mix 107.3") is a commercial radio station licensed to Tuscaloosa, Alabama, United States. It is owned by Jim Lawson Communications and the broadcast license is held by Lawson of Tuscaloosa, Inc. WMXB airs an urban adult contemporary format.

Programming is also heard on FM translator W297BJ at 107.3 MHz in Tuscaloosa. It uses its FM dial position in its moniker, "Mix 107.3."

== History ==
The station signed on the air on December 10, 1951. Its original call sign was WNPT. In the 1970s, the station was an ABC Information Network affiliate. It had a middle of the road format of popular adult music, news and sports and was owned by the West Alabama Broadcasting Company.

On December 15, 2005, the station was granted a construction permit to relocate to Eutaw, Alabama. That was coupled with an increase in broadcast power to 7,000 watts during the day and a reduction in its night power to 25 watts. The relocation did not take place and the permit expired on December 15, 2008.

The station was assigned the WMXB call letters by the Federal Communications Commission on May 11, 2010. The following month, on June 1, 2010, WMXB changed its format from urban gospel to urban adult contemporary, branded as "Mix 96.9". It had an FM translator broadcasting at 96.9 MHz.

In January 2015, WMXB rebranded as "Mix 107.3", switching its FM translator to 107.3 MHz in Tuscaloosa.
