= WTUP (AM) =

- Tupelo, Mississippi; United States
- Broadcast area: Tupelo, Mississippi
- Frequency: 1490 kHz
- Branding: Tupelo's BIN 107.7

Programming
- Format: All-news radio
- Affiliations: Black Information Network

Ownership
- Owner: iHeartMedia, Inc.; (iHM Licenses, LLC)
- Sister stations: WESE, WKMQ, WTUP-FM, WWKZ, WWZD-FM

History
- First air date: 1953
- Former frequencies: 1380 kHz (1953–1959)
- Call sign meaning: Tupelo

Technical information
- Licensing authority: FCC
- Facility ID: 68353
- Class: C
- Power: 1,000 watts
- Transmitter coordinates: 34°15′18″N 88°41′24″W
- Translator: 107.7 W299CS (Tupelo)

Links
- Public license information: Public file; LMS
- Webcast: Listen Live
- Website: tupelo.binnews.com

WTUP (1490 AM) is a radio station broadcasting a black-oriented news format, with programming from the Black Information Network. Licensed to Tupelo, Mississippi, United States, the station serves the Tupelo area. The station is owned by iHeartMedia, Inc., through licensee iHM Licenses, LLC.

== History ==
WTUP was the second broadcast radio station in Tupelo, Mississippi (the first was WELO). The station signed on as a full-service AM providing music, news and weather for Tupelo. WTUP originally broadcast with 1,000 watts at 1380 on the dial, only during the daytime. About 1959, when WELO vacated 1490 to switch to 580, WTUP switched to the 1490, in order to broadcast 24 hours. WTUP switched to a full-time contemporary Top 40 music format in about 1958 and was very successful with the younger audience, competing with WELO and its full-service format. In 1956, when hometown phenomenon Elvis Presley returned to Tupelo to perform at the annual Mississippi-Alabama Fair & Dairy Show, Jim Reese (who was the general manager of WTUP) was the MC for the concerts. WTUP employees Charlie Watts and Ron Brandon were responsible for recording interviews with Presley, actor Nick Adams, and Presley's parents, as well as recording both the afternoon and evening concerts. A tape of the interviews and concerts was found at Graceland in Memphis after Presley's death, and later released to the public by RCA on what would have been Presley's 50th birthday.

At one time, WTUP and WELO were sister stations.

The station participates in Tupelo's annual Race For The Cure fundraising marathon for the American Cancer Society.

WTUP changed formats a few times, eventually being purchased by Clear Channel Communications and 'flipped' to a sports radio format. The station broadcast professional sports teams like the St. Louis Cardinals and the Memphis Grizzlies in addition to local sports institutions such as Saltillo High School football, Tupelo High School basketball and baseball, and Mississippi Mudcats arena football. At one point, WTUP was broadcasting more than 200 live, local sports events annually.

In 2009, following a purchase of the radio station by URBan Radio Broadcasting, WTUP returned to an oldies music format and resumed "The Top Dawg" branding.

In July 2016, WTUP changed their format to a simulcast of classic hits-formatted WBVV.

On August 13, 2018, WTUP dropped the simulcast with WBVV and flipped to alternative rock as "Alt 107.7", utilizing a new FM simulcast on translator W299CS (107.7 FM). As with all iHeart alternative stations, the station carried The Woody Show in morning drive.

On February 22, 2021, WTUP changed their format to black-oriented news, branded as "Tupelo's BIN 107.7", with programming from the Black Information Network.

former logo under former sports format

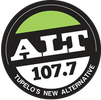
former logo under previous alternative rock format
