= WJSU-FM =

Radio station at Jackson State University in Jackson, Mississippi

Coordinates: 32.297°N 90.206°W

- Jackson, Mississippi; United States
- Frequency: 88.5 MHz (HD Radio)
- Branding: FM 88

Programming
- Format: Public radio; jazz
- Affiliations: NPR, Public Radio Exchange

Ownership
- Owner: Jackson State University

History
- First air date: 1976
- Call sign meaning: Jackson State University

Technical information
- Licensing authority: FCC
- Facility ID: 29700
- Class: C3
- ERP: 24,500 watts
- HAAT: 61 meters (200 ft)

Links
- Public license information: Public file; LMS
- Webcast: Listen Live
- Website: wjsu.org

WJSU-FM (88.5 FM) is a NPR member station in Jackson, Mississippi, United States, owned by Jackson State University. Its studios are located separately inside the Women's Business Center of Mississippi at the Mississippi e-Center, and its transmitter is atop the administration building, both on the campus of JSU on Raymond Street in Jackson.

The station carries primarily jazz-related programs, with some NPR programming and local programs, plus R&B music on Saturday mornings and gospel music all day on Sundays.

== HD Radio ==
WJSU offers HD Radio with the HD2 channel stunting with a rebroadcast of the main channel. The channel launched in August 2021 and was taken off the air temporarily due to technical difficulties. It is currently unclear what the HD2 channel will broadcast.

== See also ==
- List of jazz radio stations in the United States
