= WJJN (FM) =

- Columbia, Alabama; United States
- Broadcast area: Dothan, Alabama
- Frequency: 92.1 MHz
- Branding: Blazin' 92.1

Programming
- Format: Urban contemporary
- Affiliations: Premiere Networks

Ownership
- Owner: Wilson Broadcasting Co., Inc.
- Sister stations: WDSA, WAGF-FM, WJJN-LD

History
- First air date: 1991

Technical information
- Licensing authority: FCC
- Facility ID: 30280
- Class: A
- ERP: 7,600 watts
- HAAT: 158 meters (518 ft)
- Transmitter coordinates: 31°10′25″N 85°12′49″W

Links
- Public license information: Public file; LMS
- Webcast: Listen live
- Website: wjjn.net

WJJN (92.1 FM, "Blazin' 92.1") is a radio station licensed to Columbia, Alabama, United States. It serves Columbia-Dothan-Enterprise-Ozark. The station is owned by Wilson Broadcasting Co., Inc.

It broadcasts an urban contemporary music format to the Dothan, Alabama, area. The station broadcasts some programming from Premiere Networks.

== History ==
This station received its original construction permit from the Federal Communications Commission on November 3, 1995. The new station was assigned the call letters WJJN by the FCC on February 1, 1996. WJJN received its license to cover from the FCC on April 15, 1996.
