= WACR-FM =

Radio station in Columbus (Air Force Base), Mississippi

- Columbus Air Force Base; United States
- Broadcast area: Columbus, Mississippi
- Frequency: 105.3 MHz
- Branding: WACR 105.3 FM

Programming
- Format: Urban Adult Contemporary

Ownership
- Owner: URBan Radio Broadcasting; (GTR Licenses, LLC)
- Sister stations: WAJV, WMSU

History
- Former call signs: WWZQ (1986–1998); WWKZ (1998–2005)

Technical information
- Licensing authority: FCC
- Facility ID: 65200
- Class: C2
- ERP: 50,000 watts
- HAAT: 107.4 meters (352 ft)
- Transmitter coordinates: 33°40′09″N 88°40′08″W

Links
- Public license information: Public file; LMS
- Website: www.wacr1053.com//

WACR-FM (105.3 FM) is a radio station licensed to Columbus Air Force Base, United States. The station is currently owned by URBan Radio Broadcasting, through licensee GTR Licenses, LLC, and broadcasts an Urban Adult Contemporary format.

== History ==
The station went on the air as WWZQ on 1986-10-01. On 1998-05-22, the station changed its call sign to WWKZ, on 2005-07-20 to the current WACR-FM,
