= 2013 in North American radio =

The following is a list of events affecting radio broadcasting in 2013. Events listed include radio program debuts, finales, cancellations, and station launches, closures and format changes, as well as information about controversies.

== Notable events ==
=== January ===
Date	Event
1	WEZQ/Bangor, Maine flips from AC to Sports as "92.9 The Ticket." The station will be an affiliate of ESPN Radio but will use live staffers throughout the day.
1	Service Broadcasting sells KKDA-AM/Dallas to SKR properties, who immediately take over the station under a LMA and flip it to Korean programming after 43 years as a R&B-focused outlet serving the African American community through its various incarnations.
1	Clear Channel Communications flips two of their Fresno/Visalia, California properties, Fox Sports Radio affiliate KRZR and Adult Top 40 KALZ, to a Talk radio simulcast as "Power Talk 1400 & 96.7," using programming from co-owned Premiere Radio Networks.
2	Just weeks after letting go most of its airstaff, WTKK/Boston ended its Talk format to begin a series of format stunts, which landed on Rhythmic AC as "Hot 96.9" on January 8. The station eventually took the call sign WBQT.
3	Cumulus Media reached a deal with Arbitron to have its stations now included in Arbitron ratings and PPMs after a three-year absence, which also include sharing media and research content between the two companies.
3	Curtis Media flips Regional Mexican WYMY/Raleigh to Urban AC with the new calls WBZJ
7	WOKY/Milwaukee ends its 4-year run at Classic Country (following WZBK's departure from the same format in September 2012) to enter the market's Sports Talk battle with WSSP and WAUK, using programming from Fox Sports Radio and NBC Sports Radio as well as simulcasts of programs from sister station WTSO/Madison.
9	CKNG/Edmonton drops Classic Hits for Adult Top 40 as "92.5 Fresh FM".
10	Crain Media makes a series of shuffles in Little Rock, with KKSP shifting to Sports and relocating its Talk format to 96.5, replacing Top 40/CHR KHTE.
10	CBS Radio signs up with TuneIn to place their radio stations on TuneIn's platform. The move will not affect CBS's Radio.com platform, which will continue featuring the stations.
11	WFME/Newark, New Jersey ends Family Radio programming as it comes under the control of Cumulus Media. After a week of stunting, the rechristened WRXP launches with a country music format on January 21, returning country to the New York City market after a 17-year absence, as well as making WRXP the first station to adopt Cumulus' "Nash FM" country music branding. (WRXP would swap its call sign for the WNSH calls from its Cambridge, Minnesota sister station on January 29.)
25	In an effort to boost its ratings (as they continue to trail Rhythmic Top 40 WNVZ and Top 40/CHR WVHT in the Arbitrons after nine months), Top 40/CHR WVMA/Norfolk rebrands from "New 105.3" to "Now 105.3", eventually changing its call letters to WNOH.
28	WKTU/New York afternoon host and syndicated air personality Hollywood Hamilton signs a new deal with Premiere Networks that brings his syndicated countdown shows (The Mainstream and Rhythmic versions of Weekend Top 30 and Remix Top 30) into the Premiere syndication stable beginning February 1. In addition, his shows will also be featured on the iHeartRadio platform, which is owned by Premiere's parent company (and Hamilton's employer) Clear Channel Communications.

=== February ===
Date	Event
7	Journal Communications Top 40/CHR KSPW/Springfield fired PD/afternoon host Simon Nytes after learning that he lied about having served in the military. This comes after an Army veteran had visited the studios on February 5 and questioned Nytes' claim after an employee at the studio told him about Nytes' Army background, which he would later post the same day on YouTube.
8	Premiere Networks' The Bobby Bones Show airs its last morning program for Top 40/CHR stations, as it makes the transition to a syndicated morning program for Country stations beginning February 18.
8	iHeartRadio expands the EDM-formatted "Evolution" platform to Los Angeles, where it replaces the in-house Dance/Club Hits-formatted "Club KIIS" platform on the HD2 subchannel of Top 40/CHR KIIS-FM.
9	WMVY/Tisbury, Massachusetts moves its adult album alternative format exclusively to Internet radio, after Aritaur Communications sells the station's 92.7 FM facility to Boston University, which relaunches it as WBUA, a satellite of WBUR-FM/Boston. The Internet-only version of WMVY is operated by a nonprofit group, Friends of mvyradio, which is separate from Aritaur and unrelated to WBUR.
12	Cox Communications spins off their radio properties to different companies as part of their plan to consolidate their combined TV and radio clusters in Cox's portfolio and sell off TV and radio clusters that are not paired up in, with the stations in Southern Connecticut going to Connoisseur Media and its Richmond, Greeenville, Honolulu, Birmingham and Louisville clusters going to Summit Media.
14	KNST-FM/Tucson flips from a simulcast of its News/Talk AM sister station to Country as "Wild Country 97.1."
22	After six months as a Rhythmic, KRPT/San Antonio flips to Classic Country as "K-BUC 92.5." The Rhythmic format continues on its translator at 105.7.
25	CBS Radio sells Urban AC WUUB/West Palm Beach to Good Karma Broadcasting, who in turn immediately flip the station to a simulcast of ESPN Radio affiliate WEFL.
26	Citing a decade of financial losses they had with an African-American talk radio format, WMCS/Milwaukee dropped the format and starts stunting, adopting an adult standards format at the end of the week.

=== March ===
Date	Event
1	African-American talk outlet KCOH/Houston relocates from its longtime home at 1430 to 1230, displacing Regional Mexican KQUE under a leasing agreement between KCOH's new owner Jeese Dunn and KQUE's licensee Liberman Broadcasting. The new occupant and owner of the 1430 frequency, La Promesa Foundation, launched a Catholic programming format the same day.
1	WOLT/Greenville exits the part-time Dance Top 40/part-time brokered programming format to pick up the Oldies format from AM sister WOLI/W289BS, who in turn takes the brokered programming with Adult Standards filling in most of the other dayparts.
1	After 5 months in the format, Florence, South Carolina Rhythmic oldies trio WOLH/WHYM & W255BD flipped to ESPN Radio, bringing that Sports Talk network back after former affiliate WWFN-FM switched to CBS Sports Radio in January.
1	The FCC accepts a proposal that would see a signal upgrade for WSOS/Jacksonville from Class C3 to C2. If approved, it would require two Class C stations in Savannah, WQBT and WIXV, to switch their signals.
1	Classic rock/classic hits 92.3 Fred FM CFRK-FM in Fredericton abruptly makes its exit as it flips to Top 40/CHR as Hot 92.3
3	KNOE-FM/Monroe, Louisiana drops Top 40/CHR for Urban AC as "Mix 101.9".
4	After seeing their first proposal turned down by the CRTC in October 2012, Canada's Bell Media and Astral Media are given a greenlight by the country's Competition Bureau, paving the way for the two companies to resume their merger, but on the condition that agree to spin-off and swap several radio and TV properties, as well as allowing other broadcasters to have partial stakes in their other media properties. The CRTC approves the deal on June 27, and Bell formally acquires Astral on July 5.
4	WNRS/Herkimer, New York switches from its variety sports/business talk format to The True Oldies Channel.
11	Miami once again has a Dance outlet, as Clear Channel expands the "Evolution" brand to its translator at 93.5, W228BY. The launch coincides with the Winter Music Conference and the Ultra Music Festival, whose events take place every March during this time.
14	Sirius XM Radio removes Playboy Radio from its lineup, with the station continuing as an independent online website.
26	Smooth Jazz WAUN-FM and their translators bring the Regional Mexican format to the Green Bay, Wisconsin radio market for the first time.
26	WUIL/Champaign flips from Active Rock to Classic Hits and brings back the call letters of WKIO, which has heritage in the market from 1978 to 2005 at 92.5.
28	Clear Channel flips Atlanta stations WWVA-FM and WWLG from Rhythmic Top 40 to Alternative Rock.

=== April ===
Date	Event
1	The AC format once again goes away in the Minneapolis-St. Paul radio market, as the trimulcast of WGVX/WRXP/WGVZ flips to Sports as "The Ticket"; the CBS Sports Radio affiliate brings the number of Sports outlets in the Twin Cities to three, joining incumbents KFXN-FM and KSTP.
1	WRNB/Philadelphia drops Urban AC for Rhythmic Oldies as "Old School 100.3."
1	The 5-way Top 40 war in Albuquerque see a surprise shakeup, as American General Media switched the dial positions of Top 40/CHR KDLW and Rhythmic Top 40 sister KAGM (KDLW broadcasts at 106.7 and assigned to Los Alamos, but has clear coverage in the metro from the north at 43 kW that also covers Santa Fe; KAGM broadcasts at 106.3 and licensed to Los Lunas with 98 kW but has a somewhat semi-static signal coverage due to its transmitter being 30 miles away from the south). AGM also rebranded the monikers of KDLW as "Z106.3 Hit Music Now" and KAGM as "Power 106.7" the same day.
1	Two presenters at WWGR in Lee County, Florida, who told listeners "dihydrogen monoxide" was coming out of their water taps as part of an April Fool's Day hoax, are suspended indefinitely.
1	Clear Channel's Raleigh cluster makes a pair of call letter adjustments, with the WRDU calls moving from 106.1 to 100.7 and relaunched it as "Classic Rock 100.7" (replacing the WRVA and its "100.7 The River" moniker), while giving its Talk sister at 106.1 the WTKK calls (that WBQT/Boston gave up back in January) and rebrands it from "Rush Radio" to "106.1FM WTKK."
3	After nearly two years with an interactive Rhythmic presentation that featured Hip-Hop, WHPP/Ft. Wayne become that format's latest casualty as it flips to '90s based Pop Music as "Rewind 106.3." The Hip-Hop format moves over to the internet.
4	The Cape Cod region of Massachusetts picks up its first Rhythmic Top 40 outlet, as WHYA splits from a simulcast of Adult Hits sister WFRQ to become "Y101.1, The Beat of Cape Cod."
5	Educational Media Foundation acquires another commercial outlet with the purchase of Country KOUL/Corpus Christi from Tejas Broadcasting. KOUL will become an Air1 station after the sale closes.
9	Magic Broadcasting sells Old School Hip-Hop simulcasts KDAY/Redondo Beach and KDEY/Ontario (both serving the Los Angeles and Riverside/San Bernardino area) to RBC Communications for $19.5 Million. Both stations would have flipped to Chinese programming after the sale closes; however, the sale is eventually cancelled, and KDAY and KDEY keep their format. Magic once again sells the combo on December 11, this time to Merulo Media, who announce that they will retain the format despite being the owners of Spanish television outlet KWHY-TV
10	CING-FM/Hamilton, Ontario flips from classic hits to hot adult contemporary, rebranding as "95.3 Fresh FM."
11	Sinclair Broadcast Group purchases the radio and television assets of Fisher Communications for $373.3 million. The acquisition includes 20 television stations in eight markets (including KOMO-TV/Seattle and KATU/Portland, Oregon) and three radio stations in the Seattle market, KVI, KOMO and KPLZ. The purchase also brings Sinclair back to radio ownership for the first time since 2000, when it sold its remaining properties to Entercom and Emmis Communications (the latter buying Sinclair's St. Louis cluster).
11	The Top 40/CHR simulcasts of WHBQ and WIVG/Memphis splits up as WIVG flips to Alternative as 96X, bringing the format back to the market for the first time since 2009.
15	At approximately 2:50 pm (EDT), two explosions around Copley Square, just before the photo bridge that marks the finish line, occurred during the 2013 Boston Marathon, about three hours after the winners crossed the line. The breaking news causes local radio stations in the Boston media market to cancel or alter regular programming to carry continuing coverage of the tragedy and allowing airstaffers to help listeners who were affected by the event. At least 3 deaths were reported, in addition to 183 people injured or wounded. Four days later, all Boston radio outlets (including the music outlets) preempt programming for nonstop coverage of the massive manhunt for the suspects, a pair of brothers, after a police chase and standoff that left a MIT campus police officer and one of the two suspects dead from gunshots and other suspect escaping into a neighborhood, eluding capture for most of the day until finally being arrested.
26	WJZS, licensed to Block Island, Rhode Island but serving the Newport, Rhode Island area 25 miles to the northeast, flips from hot AC to Tor 40/CHR as "Mixx 99.3" and takes the call letters WMNP.
28	WFYV-FM/Jacksonville ends its 33-year run as an Active Rock outlet and begins stunting, landing on a simulcast of News/Talk sister WOKV on April 30.

=== May ===
Date	Event
1	KANR/Wichita flips from Regional Mexican to AC as "Light 99.7" and takes the call letters KHLT-FM. The move puts them in competition with KRBB, whose former morning host (and 22-year veteran of the station) Brett Harris was just hired by KHLT as their new morning host.
2	103.7 KVIL/Dallas-Fort Worth jettisons its "Lite FM" moniker and returns to its call letters as its on-air identity. The station also shifts its adult contemporary playlist to include songs from the 1990s to present day.
6	Community Broadcasters, LLC announces it will purchase the New York-based assets of Backyard Broadcasting, including market leader WPIG in Olean and five stations in the Elmira-Corning market.
6	The United States District Court for the Northern District of California upholds an arbitration ruling allowing The Savage Nation to leave Talk Radio Network; the Michael Savage-hosted show has been with Cumulus Media Networks since the arbitration ruling was issued in September 2012.
6	The KWNZ call letters returned to Reno, this time as a Rhythmic AC at 106.3.
6	WINK-FM/Fort Myers, Florida shifts from Adult Top 40 to AC and takes the branding "More FM."
6	Newcap's 95.9 Sun FM CHHI-FM in Miramichi makes its debut with a hot AC format bringing the AC format back to the area when CFAN-FM flipped to country in September 2012
7	A pair of Dublin, Georgia radio stations, Classic Rock/Sports Talk hybrid WDBN (at 107.9) and R&B/Hip-Hop WMLT & W245BT (at 1330 & 96.9), swap formats and frequencies.
8	Sirius XM Radio revamps its lineup that will see the addition of new radio channels featuring programming from Comedy Central and Entertainment Weekly, along with expanding CBC programming to XM channels.
13	WKZO-FM/Kalamazoo, Michigan drops its News/Talk simulcast of its AM sister station for Alternative as "Z96.5" adopting the new call sign WZOX.
15	Long Island, New York-based JVC Media acquires five stations in the Gainesville, Florida market with the purchase of Adult Top 40 WMFQ, Talk WBXY, Smooth Jazz/AC WXJZ, Country WTRS, and Sports Talk WYGC.
16	Bell Media and Astral Media sells three stations, Rhythmic Top 40 CKCE/Calgary (from Bell), and Winnipeg's Classic Hits CHIQ (from Bell) and Country CFQX (from Astral), to Jim Pattison Group as part of their planned merger.
16	WBYB (FM 103.9) moves from its original home of Kane, Pennsylvania to Eldred, Pennsylvania (in the opposite corner of McKean County), moving into the suburbs of Olean, New York where owner Colonial Radio Group maintains most of its stations. Coinciding with the move, the station ends its simulcast of WVTT (which also had its newsroom closed three weeks prior) and returns to country music, the format it held from 1981 to 2009.
17	After nearly 11 months with a bilingual top 40/CHR presentation as "Radio H2O", KESS/Dallas-Ft. Worth shifts to rhythmic top 40 as "Hot 107.9."
20	In what can be described as an economic and financial move, Saga Communications announces plans to limit the worldwide streaming broadcasts of their stations to the radio markets where Saga owns the outlets with a few exceptions.
21	After four months off the air due to a contract dispute with Cumulus Media, regionally syndicated Alabama sports talk host Paul Finebaum joins ESPN Inc. in a multimedia deal that will see Finebaum move to North Carolina.
22	After three weeks of simulcasting, Cox flips the 106.5 signal, the former home of WOKV-FM (now at 104.5), to urban AC and revives the call letters of WHJX, which once resided at their new main competitor, WSOL-FM.
23	WNTR/Indianapolis drops adult hits for adult top 40 as "Mix 107.9."
23	Just two weeks after its country format moved to WCYQ, Journal Communications flipped WNOX/Knoxville to Classic Hits.
24	Cumulus Media converts 6 of their 84 country outlets in their roster to the "Nash FM" brand: WLXX/Lexington, KHKI/Des Moines, KQFC/Boise, WKAK/Augusta, and simulcasting combo WPKR & WPCK/Green Bay.
25	Former Congresswoman Ann Marie Buerkle begins buying airtime for a monthly radio show that will air on WSYR-AM/FM.
27	Family Radio announces plans to sell off their stations.
28	Arbitron files a lawsuit against Saga Communications for copyright infringement of their ratings service, claiming that Saga, which does not subscribe to Arbitron, allowed management and employees to make decisions on programming and sales rates based on the ratings data it was not contractually licensed to have as well as use it to award employees bonuses. Arbitron cited that this practice was heavily used at Saga's Milwaukee properties WJYI, WKLH, WJMR, WHQG and WNRG-FM, which served as the basis for the lawsuit.
29	The CRTC gives the CBC the OK to allow FM stations CBC Radio 2 and Espace Musique to start airing commercials on a 3-year term agreement.
30	Results Radio shuffles its two rimshot Sacramento outlets, as Placerville-licensed KCCL moves its Classic Hits format to and trades call letters with KMJE, who moved into the market from Woodland, California, giving it a better coverage in the area. KMJE then starts stunting until December 1, when it flips to Regional Mexican as "La Buena 92.1" under new owner Lotus, who acquired the station in September.

=== June ===
Date	Event
1	Format changes come to Gainesville, Florida, as JVC Media, citing what they see as under performing stations, flips News/Talk WBXY to Dance (Ironically, the decision would also result in the early termination of morning hosts Jake Fuller and Ward Scott after bad-mouthing the move made by the new owners on-air on May 30) and at the same time transform fellow Sports sister WYGC to a simulcast of Country sister WTRS.
2	Canada's Rogers Radio follows Cumulus Media's plan to rebrand their 5 Country stations under one national brand, using the "Country (Frequency)" namesake.
3	WGL AM-FM/Fort Wayne switched to an oldies format, resuming their simulcast after three years of separate programming; WGL had been an adult standards station, while WGL-FM programmed adult contemporary. Former WLYV and WQHK-FM disc jockey Rick Hughes will serve as WGL's morning host; Pat White's afternoon show, previously only heard on WGL AM, will now also air on WGL-FM. Due to the format changes, WGL will drop The Dave Ramsey Show, and WGL-FM will drop Delilah.
4	The Walt Disney Company puts seven of Radio Disney's owned-and-operated stations—WDDY/Albany, New York, KPHN/Kansas City, KDIS-FM/Little Rock, WKSH/Milwaukee, WDZY/Richmond, KWDZ/Salt Lake City, and KRDY/San Antonio—up for sale. The stations, all serving medium-sized markets, are being sold to refocus Radio Disney's broadcast distribution on top-25 markets.
5	After 10 years with a unique Rhythmic Variety format that included Electronica/Chill (the first station in the US to feature it full-time), KLBU/Santa Fe, New Mexico flips to Spanish Adult Hits as "Juan 102.9."
10	Apple announces the launch of its new radio streaming platform called iTunes Radio.
11	Pandora Radio acquires Adult Top 40 KXMZ/Rapid City, South Dakota, which they will use to operate with a lower licensing fee to ASCAP and the record labels and to address the disconnect between what performance royalty fees are available to terrestrial radio stations and digital services operated by terrestrial station owners as opposed to companies that are strictly digital.
14	KNBQ/Centralia, Washington flips from a simulcast of Sports sister KJR/Seattle to Adult Top 40 as "102.9 Now," under the KYNW call sign. The station is targeting the Olympia and Tacoma areas.
17	For the first time since making the transition to AC in 1989 as "Lite 93.9," WLIT/Chicago shifts to Hot AC and rebrands its moniker to "My 93.9."
17	Sports talk WQXI/Atlanta fires the hosts of its morning program "Mayhem in the AM" (Steak Sharpiro, Nick Cellini, and Chris Dimino) after they used a mock interview of former New Orleans Saints player Steve Gleason, who is battling Lou Gerhig's disease by parodying his robotic voice as if they were answering questions to him (as Gleason has lost the ability to speak and has to use a computer device to communicate).
18	Wasatch Public Media, the owners of KCPW-FM/Salt Lake City, announces that they will drop their affiliation with NPR effective June 24 as a way to differentiate its programming from another NPR affiliate in the area, the University of Utah's KUER.
20	WNSH/New York City launches its new morning show, the Nashville-based America's Morning Show; the program is hosted by Blair Garner, who will depart as host of Premiere Networks' After Midnite on July 31.
24	Up 93.1 CIHI-FM makes its debut in Fredericton reportedly with an adult hits format this comes after sister station CFRK-FM dropped classic hits for CHR in March
25	The Phil Hendrie Show joins Dial Global after seeing its 4-year run on Talk Radio Network end.
25	One month before his previously announced departure from the station was to have taken place, Dave Rutherford is dropped from CHQR/Calgary, Alberta after his on-air criticism of the Corus Entertainment station's reliance on news feeds from an Edmonton sister station during the catastrophic flooding that affected Calgary and southern Alberta.
28	WZNN/Birmingham drops its sports talk format and begins stunting, first with Hawaiian music, then with patriotic music (July 4), and then to variety hits (as "Y'all 97.3") on July 5.

=== July ===
Date	Event
1	WIOU/Kokomo, Indiana shifts from a news/talk/sports station to a full-time sports format, largely provided by ESPN Radio. With the change, the station's existing sports programming will continue, but all political talk programming will be removed from the schedule.
1	KTSO/Tulsa flips from Classic Hits to AC as 94.1 The Breeze, the first AC-formatted station in Tulsa since 2010, when KBEZ flipped to Variety Hits.
1	Adam Bomb replaces Perez Hilton as the host of Cumulus Media's Nights Live program. Hilton will continue to offer gossip updates on the show.
3	WLQT/Dayton drops AC for Country, branding themselves as "Hot Country B94.5." This will be Clear Channel's second attempt with this format in this market, as the last one was tried at sister station WDSJ, which lasted only 11 months before their flip to Classic Hits in 2011.
3	Billings picks up a second Top 40/CHR, as Classic Hits KKBR becomes "Pop Crush 97.1."
3	Five more Cumulus-owned Country outlets are rebranded to the "Nash FM" brand: WSJR/Scranton-Wilkes Barre, WHLZ/Florence, South Carolina, WHKR/Melbourne, Florida, KAYD/Beaumount, Texas, and WKOS/Kingsport, Tennessee.
3	Cumulus Media also spins off a station, as Sports Talk KTDK/Dallas is sold to Whitley Media in a unique two-part deal in which Cumulus will receive $100 in the first part of the deal. Whitley will then turn around and resell the station at which point Cumulus will receive all proceeds from that sale minus all expenses incurred in the operation of the station and from marketing and reselling the station. However, that deal is rejected by the FCC, resulting in Cumulus taking KTDK off the air on October 6 and plans to return the license back to the FCC and moving its sports format to WBAP-FM.
3	The number of Adult Top 40s in Salt Lake City increases to three as AC KBEE becomes the latest entry in this battle.
3	Rogers rebrands all country stations to its unified "Country" branding.
7	iHeartRadio expands its device platform to 8 countries, including its first Canadian outlets CHUM-FM/Toronto and CFBT/Vancouver, and selected stations owned by Groupo ACIR and Multimedios in Mexico.
15	WTCB/Columbia, South Carolina is the latest Cumulus Media outlet to make a shift from AC to Adult Top 40.
15	L&L Broadcasting acquires YMF Media's Jackson, Mississippi radio cluster, which consists of Gospel WOAD, Oldies WJQS, News/Talk WJNT, R&B/Hip-Hop WJMI, Sports WRKS and Adult R&B WKXI.
16	Sandusky Publishing ends 36 years of radio ownership by selling its properties in Seattle and Phoenix to Hubbard Broadcasting.
18	After a year as a News/Talk simulcast, WMNI/Columbus breaks from its FM simulcast and returns to Adult Standards. Six days later on July 24, WMNI-FM also ditched the News/Talk format and brings the Jack FM format back to Columbus.
24	KARS in Belen, New Mexico completes an upgrade moving from 860 to 840 kHz closer to Albuquerque at increased daytime power and signing on a 99 watt FM translator K275AO 102.9 launching a new modern rock format branded as "Area 102-9" at noon.
26	KBZD/Amarillo flips from Classic Country to Adult Top 40 as "Fun 99.7." The flip came after two weeks of micro-stunting with a female-oriented presentation. The station's former manager left a message on its former Facebook page for the previous format, stating that "They didn't like me or the format so we are both gone."
26	KMVK/Ft. Worth-Dallas shifts from Spanish Contemporary to Regional Mexican as "La Grande 107.5." The flip would result in Univision shuffling its Dallas/Ft. Worth cluster on July 29, with KFZO becoming a simulcast of KDXX and KESS dropping Rhythmic Top 40 for Regional Mexican. KESS's "Hot" format was relocated to its HD2 subchannel where it remained until mid-August.
28	KNRQ/Eugene officially switches signals from 97.9 to 103.7, replacing KXPC, which Cumulus Media acquired in a swap with EMF for KRUZ/Santa Barbara in 2011. Cumulus has taken over the KXPC calls and parked them at the 97.9 frequency, which relocated to Aloha, Oregon and began targeting the Portland area, where it expedited construction on a new transmitter and start testing with music until a new format is launched. On August 5, EMF purchases KXPC from Cumulus, who will turn the station into a K-Love network affiliate, replacing co-owned rimshot KLVP.
29	Austin, Texas sees an R&B station hit the airwaves as KKMJ-HD3/K242CC broke from the Talk radio simulcast of KJCE/Rollingwood and flips to Urban AC as "96.3 RnB".
30	After seven months with a Sports Talk format, WCFN/Cincinnati returns to Rhythmic Oldies for the third time as "Old School 100.3." They become the first station in the US to drop its affiliation with CBS Sports Radio.
31	KPHN/Kansas City and KDIS-FM/Little Rock (Radio Disney Owned-and-operated stations with sale pending), went Silent.

=== August ===
Date	Event
1	WLPA/Lancaster, Pennsylvania switches from Fox Sports Radio (which it had carried since July 2005) to ESPN Radio. The station had attempted to affiliate with ESPN Radio for some years beforehand, but was unable to do so due to its geographic proximity to WGLD/Manchester Township; however, WGLD's owner, Cumulus Media, affiliated its sports stations with CBS Sports Radio in early 2013, making the ESPN affiliation available to WLPA.
2	Clear Channel sells its stake in Sirius XM Radio and will remove its programming from the lineup effective August 28, leaving only KIIS-FM/Los Angeles and WHTZ/New York City as the only terrestrial offering on Sirius XM's channel lineup.
5	Boston University sells WBUR's 1240 AM in West Yarmouth, Massachusetts (on Cape Cod) to Alex Langer, who will program it with Portuguese-language programming similar to that of new sister station WSRO/Ashland. The 1240 AM facility had been deemed redundant following the acquisition of WBUA/Tisbury in February.
7	Merlin Media reaches a deal to sell WWIQ/Philadelphia to the Educational Media Foundation. With the sale, the station will end its year-old news/talk format and return to religious programming (it had been a Family Radio station from 1968 until 2012); this move will leave Imus in the Morning, The Glenn Beck Program and The Sean Hannity Show uncleared in the Philadelphia market. The Rush Limbaugh Show is likely to return to former affiliate WPHT.
8	Rick Jeanneret, the radio (and later television) play-by-play voice of the Buffalo Sabres since 1971, announces his retirement effective in 2016 and that he will reduce his duties each season until that time. Dan Dunleavy, previously the play-by-play man for the rival Toronto Maple Leafs, will move across the border and serve as Jeanneret's substitute, taking over fully for Jeanneret in 2016 (whether Dunleavy's duties will include both radio and TV is not yet known; the Sabres' television contract expires in 2016).
12	WMGC/Detroit drops AC for Sports and becomes the new affiliate for ESPN Radio, as well as featuring local content. They will face competition from WXYT, who currently dominates the ratings and has broadcast rights to the four sports teams in Detroit.
12	KYZZ/Salinas-Monterey, which previously carried ESPN Radio until it left the air on May 24, returns to the air with a Classical format, filling the void that was left by KBOQ in 2011.
14	After a 26-year run as a Classic Rock station, KRXO/Oklahoma City began transitioning from its long time home at 107.7 to its translator at 104.5 and KRXO's HD2 channel. The 107.7 signal flips to Sports Talk, putting it in competition with WWLS-FM and is expected to lure the airstaffers over from that station to help launch the upstart.
15	Two MBS radio stations in Saint John, New Brunswick flipped formats: CJYC-FM flipped to classic hits as "Kool 98", while CFBC flips from oldies/classic hits to country.
15	CKDH-FM in Amherst, Nova Scotia flips from AC/hot AC to country.
16	KENZ/Salt Lake City drops Alternative for Classic Hits, giving the market its fourth outlet with the same format.
16	KNOB/Santa Rosa, California drops the Bob FM format for Alternative after declining ratings. The station's logo is loosely patterned after sister station WROX/Norfolk
17	KWDZ/Salt Lake City (Radio Disney O&O station) dropped the affiliation and went Silent.
18	Just one year after it was sold to Lincoln Financial Media, ESPN Radio affiliate WAXY-FM/West Palm Beach officially completes its move into Miramar, giving the station full signal coverage into the Miami-Ft. Lauderdale market,
19	KIFM/San Diego shifts from Smooth AC to Soft AC as "Easy 98.1."
19	After a day of stunting with a "Wheel of Formats", Active Rock KQWB-FM/Fargo, North Dakota flips to Adult Top 40 as "Big 98.7"
19	After 23 years as an Adult Top 40, WRQX/Washington adjusts its direction and returns to Top 40/CHR. It also dropped the "Mix 107.3" moniker in favor of "All The Hits."
26	Bell Media spins off five stations, CFXJ & CHBM/Toronto, and CISL, CKZZ & CHHR/Vancouver, to Newcap Radio for (CDN)$112 Million.
26	CKUL-FM in Halifax, Nova Scotia flips from classic hits to adult alternative/triple A branded as "Radio 96.5"
29	Rogers Media rebrands all four EZ rock stations to the Kiss FM branding
29	CJRW-FM Summerside, Prince Edward Island flips from classic rock (102.1 Spud FM) to hot AC (Spud 102 FM) becoming the fourth MBS radio station to change formats
30	After stunting with news of an "Alien Invasion" that resulted in local law enforcement adding security measures to area schools, WMSR/Muscle Shoals, Alabama flips from Top 40/CHR to AAA
30	After 22 years of AAA, KMTT/Tacoma-Seattle flips to Rhythmic Hot AC as "Hot 103.7, The Rhythm of Seattle." The flip fills the void left by KQMV, who shifted to Top 40/CHR in 2011.
30	In a unique but complex deal, Cumulus Media acquires Dial Global for $260 Million, plus an additional $45 Million as part of a retiring debt deal. Cumulus will then merge its in-house and Dial Global's network and syndication operations into a newly revived version of Westwood One. Cumulus then in turn sell 53 stations to Townsquare Media and 15 more to Peak Broadcasting, the latter swapping its Fresno cluster to Cumulus as part of the arrangement. Cumulus also buys back the Green Bay cluster it had LMA'd to Clear Channel in 2009.
30	CKX-FM/Brandon abruptly flips from mainstream rock to variety hits, branded as "Bob FM."
30	Classic rocker CHNS-FM/Halifax flips to classic hits as "The Wave." This quickly fills a void left in the Halifax market after Newcap's CKUL-FM flipped to AAA.

=== September ===
Date	Event
2	Cumulus Media makes its third format change in their Salt Lake City radio cluster, as it flips Active Rock KHTB to Alternative as "ALT 94.9." The station will retain their airstaff and in the process shifts the Active Rock product over to sister station KBER.
5	WWKB/Buffalo, New York ends its seven-year run as a progressive talk radio outlet and adopts a 24/7 feed of ESPN Radio. WWKB takes over the ESPN affiliation from sister station WGR, who had been a charter affiliate of the network since 1992. WWKB's existing sports rights and brokered weekend programs will continue unaffected.
6	Cumulus Media rebrands 6 more Country outlets to the "Nash FM" brand: WFYR/Peoria, WJCL/Savannah, KAMO/Fayetteville, Arkansas, KXKC/Lafayette, Louisiana, WMDH/Muncie, Indiana, and WLFF/Myrtle Beach, South Carolina.
12	CKMX Calgary ditches its classic country format as it flips to all-comedy radio as Funny 1060
13	Cumulus Media pulls the plug on its last "Gen X" formatted outlet, as WRQQ/Baton Rouge flips to Classic Hits.
19	CJED-FM/Niagara Falls, Ontario dumps its adult hits format and begins stunting with Christmas music. All original programming ceases the next day as the station begins simulcasting CFLZ-FM/Fort Erie.
19	The Kennewick/Richland/Pasco, Washington radio market picks a Rhythmic Top 40, as Classic Hits KOLW becomes "Hot 97.5."
20	First Media Radio files to sell WCBT/Roanoke Rapids, North Carolina to Johnson Broadcast Ventures. Upon the sale's completion, the station will drop its sports talk programming from ESPN Radio for a music format featuring gospel and classic soul.
24	WURV/Richmond shifts from Modern AC to Adult Top 40 as "Play 103.7."
26	WLKK/Wethersfield, New York flips to Alternative, ending its two-year simulcast of WBEN.
28	WDDY/Albany, WDZY/Colonial Heights-Richmond, WKSH/Sussex-Milwaukee and KRDY/San Antonio (Radio Disney Owned-and-operated stations with sale pending), went Silent.
30	Nielsen Holdings officially retires the Arbitron name, as it rebrands as Nielsen Radio, effective with the October PPMs.

=== October ===
Date	Event
1	The United States federal government shutdown of 2013 effects some communications operations for the government, with the Federal Communications Commission suspending reviews of mergers between station groups, which usually take 180 days to complete, due to the FCC being drawn down to only a spare 2% skeleton crew of workers, and a halt to work on all applications.
2	Two days after Pembrook Pines Media Group sells its Steuben and Chemung County stations, the company's Salamanca, New York stations (WQRS/WGGO) return to the formats they held before the sale to Pembrook, classic rock and oldies respectively. WGGO's affiliation with ESPN Radio moves to WHDL.
4	Summit Media's KRTR/Honolulu drops Soft AC/Adult Standards for Filipino programing under a LMA from Imelda Ortega Anderson's Pinoy Power Media and takes the new calls KPRP.
5	In a complicated, multi-band frequency swap, brokered religious station WVOA-LP moves its programming to the audio feed of the former WMBO (87.7, in TV channel 6), while the station's former FM frequency (103.9/Mexico, New York) changes its call sign to WNDR-FM and begins stunting with Christmas music.
11	Just one year after it dropped the format for Spanish AC and later to Variety Hits respectively, WSHE-FM/Miami returns to R&B/Hip-Hop and revives its "103.5 The Beat" moniker.
14	Talk Radio Network sues one of its last remaining hosts, Jerry Doyle. The move comes just days after another TRN host, Andrea Tantaros, had sued the network.
21	WBAP-FM/Flower Mound, Texas switches from the simulcast of WBAP News/Talk 820 AM to a simulcast of KTCK SportsRadio 1310 The Ticket. The FM simulcast of WBAP-AM moves to KPLX 99.5 HD2.
23	CKKY Wainwright, Alberta abandons the country music format and the Key 83 branding as it moves from its AM 830 position to 101.9 FM becoming K-Rock 101.9 with a classic/mainstream rock format
28	The Santa Barbara Foundation announces that it will sell KDB/Santa Barbara, California. In a statement, the station said that it was unable to attract enough revenue from contributing listeners to support KDB's operations, despite an increase in advertising revenue. The foundation hopes to sell the station at a discount to interests that would retain KDB's classical music format (citing the "continuing community benefit" of continuing this programming), but will also consider full-price offers from groups that will program a format of their choosing (in which the proceeds will go toward an endowment to support classical music in the area).
31	As part of a shuffle that was arraigned by the FCC in 2006, four stations will switch frequencies on this date: KSAS/Boise, Idaho will move from 103.3 to 103.5, KSKI/Sun Valley, Idaho will relocate from 103.7 to 94.5, and KZNO/Jerome, Idaho shifting from 102.9 to 103.1, paving the way for KPHD/Elko, Nevada, which broadcasts at 97.5, to change its COL to Melba, Idaho, thus entering the Boise market and change its frequency to 102.7.

=== November ===
Date	Event
1	WKSL/Raleigh flips from Rhythmic Top 40 to Country as "B93.9." The station will challenge the more dominant WQDR for listeners in the Research Triangle area.
1	The "KISS-FM" branding returns to Jacksonville, as WNWW ditches the "Radio Now" branding after 2 years.
1	The San Diego Top 40 radio war will lose a competitor, as Cherry Creek Radio sells rimshot KSIQ to Educational Media Foundation, who at the same time also makes a deal that will see KKCS/Colorado Springs, Colorado swap frequencies with Pueblo Country outlet KIQN. Both deals will close in 2014.
1	Paducah, Kentucky loses a Classic Rock outlet, as WQQR begins stunting with Christmas music that will lead up to a format flip after the holiday season. WQQR also joins a growing list of stations in the United States to jump on the Christmas Music bandwagon that even saw rival outlets in Louisville and Norfolk enter the fray on this date. The Classic Rock format would quickly find a new home on November 6 at former Adult Top 40 WJLI.
6	Non-commercial Top 40/CHR KVIT/Apache Junction, Arizona, a student-run outlet serving the Phoenix area based out of the East Valley Institute of Technology, flips to Dance and bills itself as "Teen Pulse Radio." The station becomes the second student-run outlet in the United States (after KNHC/Seattle) to program a full-time Dance format.
7	Rusty Humphries leaves Talk Radio Network for undisclosed reasons.
8	After three years as a Top 40/CHR, WZNY/Augusta, Georgia picks up the Classic Rock format of sister station WEKL, who in turn flips back to Country after seven years as "G105.7."
14	In a unanimous decision that included the support of The Minority Media And Telecommunications Council, The FCC approved loosening restrictions to allow foreign companies to expand its ownership of broadcasting properties beyond the 25% cap on a case-by-case basis.
15	WRCN/Long Island, New York drops its Mainstream Rock format and starts playing Christmas Music in advance of launching a News/Talk format after the Holiday season.
18	After a nine-year run in the morning slot since its flip from Rhythmic AC to News/Talk in 2004, Jim Quinn and Rose Somma Tennent exit WPGB/Pittsburgh and in the process end their syndicated voice tracked program "The War Room with Quinn & Rose," after the hosts and station management could not come to terms on a new contract.
22	WTMJ/Milwaukee announces it will not renew its agreement with Learfield Communications to air Wisconsin Badgers broadcasts after the 2013–2014 academic year. WTMJ had aired Badger broadcasts in one form or another for 86 years, holding broadcast rights directly until Learfield acquired the rights in 1994.
28	WRMA/Miami dropped their Rhythmic Top 40 format and swapped frequencies with Tropical sister WXDJ. The move comes in the wake of morning host DJ Laz's departure from WRMA and sister station KXOL/Los Angeles November 22, along with low ratings for WRMA since the flip from Spanish Contemporary in June 2012.

=== December ===
Date	Event
1	WILV/Chicago drops its Retro-based 80s format and makes a transition back towards a current-based AC format, which it previously had before 1997, and fills the void left by WLIT back in June.
2	The CRTC approves power increases for Cogeco's Montreal properties, as Francophone Talk CHMP (at 40.8 kW) and Anglophone Rhythmic Top 40 CKBE (at 44.1 kW) both upgrade their power to 100 kW respectively. Both moves are being enabled by the lifting of the Department of Industry's moratorium on power increases at the site in the heart of Montreal.
6	The Educational Media Foundation adds Rhythmic Top 40 WHWT/Huntsville, Alabama to its list of acquisitions, bringing the K-Love format to the market in 2014.
7	WEMP/Two Rivers, Wisconsin begins broadcasting under program test authority for a one-day period with easy listening music interspersed with oldies, nine days before the station's construction permit was to expire. The station uses WLKN/Cleveland's studios, tower and transmitter for the PTA, with WLKN going silent for the day to allow it.
8	Clear Channel's Australian subsididary Australian Radio Network announced that it will relaunch its Sydney Adult Top 40 outlet Mix 106.5 as Top 40/CHR "KIIS 106.5" on January 20, 2014, with former 2Day FM personalities Kyle & Jackie O taking over the morning slot. The move comes as ARN expands the KISS-FM brand Down Under with relaunches being planned for its "Mix FM" outlets in Melbourne, Brisbane, Adelaide, and Canberra. However, on December 18, a Cease & Desist was filed against ARN by narrowcaster Kiss FM Australia, claiming legal use of the name since 2005 and repeated warnings on November 27 over ARN using the branding, citing trade mark infringement rights.
9	After spending two weeks with a part-time Rhythmic Hot AC direction on evenings and weekends, Adult Hits WIQI/Chicago goes full-time with the format.
13	After six years with Adult Hits, WDRQ/Detroit flips to Country and adopts the "Nash FM" moniker.
16	Top 40/CHR WXKS/Boston apologizes to listeners and concertgoers after lying onstage during their December 14 Jingle Ball holiday concert that headliner Miley Cyrus was at the TD Garden ready to perform, but she and her entourage was stuck at Teterboro Airport in New Jersey and unable to make her flight into Boston for the show due to a snowstorm that cancelled all flights in parts of the Northeast. While Cyrus called into night host Mikey V to tell him what happened, the other air staffers were "teasing" the concertgoers who were in the building that Cyrus was there, joking around about trying to get ready before going on stage for over two hours before coming clean to the audience.
23	Clear Channel Communications and Cumulus Media made a massive shuffle affecting primarily its conservative talk lineup.: The Rush Limbaugh Show and The Sean Hannity Show will both end their carriage contracts with former flagship station WABC/New York City and, beginning January 2, 2014, move to crosstown rival WOR, which had been acquired by Clear Channel in 2012.; In Los Angeles, Limbaugh will leave longtime West Coast flagship KFI and join Hannity as the anchors of an all-syndicated conservative talk format on KTLK.; In San Francisco, Limbaugh and Hannity will leave KKSF and move to KNEW. Both KTLK and KNEW are Clear Channel-owned stations that had previously aired progressive talk formats, which are being abandoned in the format changes.; Cumulus Media will move The Savage Nation into Hannity's former time slot on its stations, will cancel existing programs hosted by Geraldo Rivera and Mike Huckabee, and bring in Dennis Miller from Westwood One (which Cumulus received in a swap with Oaktree Capital Management in August) to fill Limbaugh's former time slot. (Rivera's show will continue as a local show on WABC.)
26	Clear Channel makes major format and frequency adjustments in four markets: In Des Moines, both Adult Top 40 KPTL and Alternative KCCQ swap places and relaunch with new brandings, as KCCQ becomes "ALT 106.3" and KPTL becomes "NOW 105.1."; In Sacramento, KHLX, which had programmed Classic Hits until November when it began playing Christmas Music, became a simulcast of KFBK and swapped call letters and frequency positions with KFBK-FM, who took over the 93.1 position. KHLX, now at 92.5 flipped to a new format in 2014.; In Jackson, Mississippi, WJDX-FM shifts from Oldies to Classic Hits as "105.1 The River."; In San Diego, KSSX shifts from Rhythmic Oldies to Rhythmic Hot AC.
26	Classic Hits WEGI & WEGI-FM/Clarksville, Tennessee flips to Variety Hits as "Rewind 94.3."
26	CHFM/Calgary drops Adult Contemporary for Adult Top 40 as "95.9 Kiss FM", giving that market three Top 40 stations.
26	WPHR-FM/Vero Beach, Florida drops Conservative Talk for Country.
26	Up the road in Gainesville, WBXY and WXJZ swapped signals, as WBXY take over the 100.9 frequency, while a new format will take over the 99.5 frequency after New Year's Day.
26	CHFT-FM Fort McMurray, Alberta rebrands from 100.5 K-Rock to Cruz 100.5 FM
27	CKEA-FM Edmonton flips to classic hits (95.7 Cruz FM)
31	After 20 years of Classic Rock, KKRW/Houston flips to R&B/Hip-Hop as "93.7 The Beat." The move brings the format back to the same frequency when it was last used by KRLY from 1980 to 1982. The station also changed its callsign to KQBT on January 15, 2014.
31	After 55 years at various stations in the Mohawk Valley, Hank Brown will retire as "your host for coffee and toast" when he leaves his current position as morning host at WUSP.

== Debuts ==
Date	Event
January 2	CBS Sports Radio makes its launch across the United States. Most of the affiliates are primarily stations owned by CBS Radio and Cumulus Media outlets, as both groups are joint partners in this new venture.
January 20	Herman Cain will return to radio, hosting the program previously hosted by Neal Boortz.
March 2	The program "The Country Top 30 with Bobby Bones," hosted by Austin, Texas, radio personality Bobby Estell (aka Bobby Bones), debuts in syndication.
August 19	Following a three-day stunt in which Patti Page's "Old Cape Cod" was played on a loop, WKFY/East Harwich, Massachusetts (on Cape Cod) will launch with a format described by the station as "oldies, classic album cuts and modern artists loved by older listeners." WKFY will be targeted to listeners over 50.
August 26	D.L. Hughley will make his foray in syndicated radio, as he debuts a daily program that will air on Urban AC stations.
September 30	Nickelodeon (Viacom) launches the iHeartRadio exclusive-Nick Radio with Clear Channel Media and Entertainment.
November 26	The Rhythmic Hot AC format comes to Western Alabama, as WLYB/Livingston-Demopolis signs on.

== Closings ==
Date	Event
January 11	WIBX/Utica, New York ends its Sportswatch program, a long-running local broadcast that produced a large number of prominent sportscasters.
February 7	After nearly 29 years of providing comedy programs and prep material to radio stations in the United States and Canada, as well as to international broadcasters, Dial Global pulls the plug on American Comedy Network, stating that ACN "wasn't viable any longer in terms of national coverage."
February 17	CKOT/Tillsonburg, Ontario, the last daytime-only station in Canada, signs off. Its programming will continue on CJDL-FM, which had simulcast CKOT since 2007.
March 20	In a surprise move amid the recent losses of high-profile Urban AC affiliates, Michael Baisden announced on his Facebook page that he will end his show on March 29 (even though he promises to come back in another form), but hours after he made that announcement Baisden learned that his syndicator Cumulus Media locked him and his staff out of his studios and started running repeats of his program until March 29, of which Baisden later responded "In the words of Rodney King, "Can’t we all get along?" Just because we couldn't come to an agreement is no reason to deprive the listeners, our affiliates, and our advertisers of only 9 days to say goodbye and show our appreciation."
April 15	Michael Smerconish leaves terrestrial radio, ending his nationally syndicated program on Dial Global.
May	(date unknown) WKZV/Washington, Pennsylvania signs off.
May 9	WUOW/Milford-Oneonta, New York signs off after less than one year on air (although it was preceded by WUOW-LP, a low-power station that signed on in 2005).
May 23	WUTI/Utica, New York is vandalized and forced off the air. It never returned; its license was canceled by the Federal Communications Commission on August 11, 2014.
June 8	WQSV/Ashland City, Tennessee signs off due to a lack of local advertising support; the station's studio and transmitter site were sold in a foreclosure sale to Community Bank & Trust on June 14.
June 9	Nick Cannon's weekly countdown program airs its last show.
June 27	The Monday through Thursday edition of Talk of the Nation ends its run on NPR. Science Friday will continue unaffected as a standalone program.
June 30	Allen Hunt ends his radio program.
July 19	Univision airs the final broadcast of Eddie "Piolín" Sotelo's syndicated morning program "Piolín Por La Manaña." On July 22, the program is cancelled by Univision and all references related to his show are deleted from the company's corporate and radio station websites. His program (which originated from KSCA/Los Angeles) has been replaced with music programming at his former affiliates.
September 6	Talk Radio Network shuts down its America's Radio News Network all-news radio service. The entirety of the network's weekday lineup leaves the network by the end of the year.
October 7	KTDK/Sanger, Texas, formerly the simulcast of KTCK SportsRadio 1310 The Ticket, has ceased operations. Owner Cumulus Media has surrendered this station's license the following week.
November 18	A contract dispute forces the abrupt cancellation of The War Room with Quinn and Rose.
December 3	After a 15-year run, the message board Radio Discussions (originally Radio-Info until May) is shut down.
December 20	John R. Gambling will retire from radio. Gambling's morning-drive radio program in New York City had run near-continuously for 88 years and had previously been hosted by his father and grandfather.
December 31	Cumulus Media will end the syndicated programs hosted by Geraldo Rivera and Mike Huckabee. Rivera's show will become a local broadcast in the same midday timeslot at flagship WABC/New York City starting January 1, 2014; Dennis Miller (acquired in Cumulus's acquisition of Dial Global) will fill the two hosts' place in the Cumulus syndicated lineup.

== Deaths ==
Date	Person	Age	Notability
January 11	Jimmy O'Neill	72	Disc jockey (credits include KQV/Pittsburgh, WCAE/Pittsburgh, KRLA/Los Angeles, KFWB/San Francisco, KDAY/Redondo Beach)
February 1	Ed Koch	88	Mayor of New York City from 1977 to 1989; host of a weekly radio program on WBBR/New York
March 6	Stompin' Tom Connors	77	Canadian radio host (CKGB/Timmins) and country/folk musician
April 16	Pat Summerall	82	American radio and television host and football commentator (radio credits include morning host at WCBS/New York from 1966 to 1969 and at various times color commentator and studio host for NFL on CBS Radio)
April 26	George Jones	81	American country musician (hosted a show on KCOX/Jasper, Texas from 1947 to 1949), staple of the classic country format
May 11	Arnold Peters	87	English actor, who played Jack Woolley in The Archers soap opera for 31 years.
May 13	Joyce Brothers	85	American psychologist who hosted the first ever radio program to dispense psychological advice
May 25	Gene Burns	72	American libertarian talk radio host (WHHG/Hornell, New York, WCBM/Baltimore, WEEI/Boston, WKIS/Orlando, Florida, WCAU/Philadelphia, WRKO/Boston, WOR/New York City, KGO/San Francisco)
June 5	Don Bowman	75	Disc jockey at several radio stations in the central United States (including KRZK in Branson, Missouri), comedian and original host of American Country Countdown
June 28	Jim Nayder	59	Program director for WBEZ/Chicago; host of WBEZ's Magnificent Obsession and NPR's Annoying Music Show
July 27	Kidd Kraddick	53	American radio and television personality, host of the syndicated Kidd Kraddick in the Morning show.
August 6	Betty Pinto	65	American radio personality and PD, nicknamed "Reina de la Radio" ("Queen of the Radio") by her listeners in the Miami area, working at WRTO, WAMR, WRMA, and WCMQ in various airshift and programming duties
October 23	Bill Mazer	92	American radio and television host, best known for his long stints in Buffalo and New York City
November 12	David "EZ Street" Hamilton	45	American radio and television personality, program/music director, remixer, and magazine publisher (Alumni of WKKV/Milwaukee, WPOW/Miami, KYSR/Los Angeles, KCHZ/Kansas City, KVYB/Santa Barbara, WPYO/Orlando, KVEG/Las Vegas, and KKFR/Phoenix; Contributor/fill-in for Weekend Top 30 and Remix Top 30; founder/chief editor of "House of Style" magazine)
November 28	Jerry Boulding	75	American radio personality, PD, consultant, songwriter, journalist, music executive, historian and philanthropher
December 15	Harold Camping	92	American minister/preacher and founder/owner of Family Radio
December 18	Larry Lujack	73	American radio personality, nicknamed "Superjock" during his tenure at WLS and WCFL/Chicago
December 18	Ken Hutcherson	61	American professional football player, minister and frequent guest on the Glenn Beck Program and The Rush Limbaugh Show
December 21	Geoff Stirling	92	Canadian multimedia mogul, owner of CHOZ-FM
December 31	Bob Grant	84	American conservative talk radio host (WABC, WOR and WMCA/New York City, WWDB/Philadelphia, WBBM/Chicago, KNX and KABC/Los Angeles)
