= WOKJ =

Radio station in Jackson, Mississippi (1965–1990)

- Jackson, Mississippi; United States
- Broadcast area: Jackson, Mississippi
- Frequency: 1550 kHz

Ownership
- Owner: David R. Price

History
- First air date: April 7, 1965
- Last air date: July 1990
- Former call signs: WMOE, WJAQ (CP)

Technical information
- Facility ID: 15800
- Class: D
- Power: 50,000 watts (day); 10,000 Watts (night)
- Transmitter coordinates: 32°20′41″N 90°24′50″W

WOKJ was an American radio station in Jackson, Mississippi. The station operated at 1550 kHz, and with a daytime output power of 50,000 watts during the day, and 10,000 watts at night, with changing directional antenna patterns, from 1965 until it was silenced in 1990.

== History ==
John M. McLendon's Radio Mississippi received a construction permit from the Federal Communications Commission (FCC) for a new AM radio station in Jackson on May 3, 1961. Originally assigned the call letters WMOE, the station became WJAQ and then WOKJ in January 1965. The call letter move was significant, as McLendon had previously owned WOKJ (1590 AM), which was the first Black-oriented radio station in the state of Mississippi when it began in 1954. That station became WWUN when McLendon sold it to start WOKJ on 1550. The new WOKJ debuted April 7, 1965. Both on 1590 and 1550, it was a public service stalwart, holding community events, broadcasting Jackson State Tigers football games and reporting on the civil rights movement.

The station was sold to Tri-Cities Broadcasting Corporation in 1971. Tri-Cities, headed by E. O. Roden, acquired WJMI (99.7 FM) from the Rebel Broadcasting Corporation in 1973. The move came after a yearlong fight at the FCC and saw the FM station change from easy listening to a format that, like WOKJ, targeted the Black community in Jackson. WOKJ aired music and information programming, including the weekday call-in program "Open Line" and other public affairs features.

In late 1986, Tri-Cities sold its AM and FM stations in Jackson and in Gulfport, Mississippi, as well as Pensacola, Florida, to Holt Communications Corporation in a $9.5 million transaction. Two years later, Holt acquired WOAD (1400 AM), the market's heritage gospel station, from John Pembroke. WOKJ, by then struggling against WJMI and WKXI (1300 AM), was then sold to David R. Price, of Washington, Louisiana; the station was silent from August 1 to late November, when it returned with a country music format. Studios and offices were then moved to WOKJ's transmitter facilities on Tower Road in the Jackson suburb of Bolton.

The initial country format was jettisoned for album-oriented rock in July 1989, due to lack of interest; several air personalities from the former WCKO, which had just made a flip in the opposite direction to country, moved to WOKJ.

By July 1990, however, WOKJ had gone silent for good. In May 1991, the FCC issued a show-cause order to Price, alleging that in addition to taking the station off air without FCC approval, he had failed to light the six 388-foot (118 m) towers at Bolton. The FCC revoked the license and assessed an $8,000 fine against Price for the lighting issue.
