= WIIN =

Currently silent
- Ridgeland, Mississippi; United States
- Broadcast area: Jackson, Mississippi
- Frequency: 780 kHz
- Branding: Blues 102.1

Programming
- Language: English
- Format: Blues

Ownership
- Owner: The Radio People; (New South Radio, Inc.)
- Sister stations: WHJT, WJKK, WUSJ, WYOY

History
- First air date: 1984; 42 years ago (as WYAI)
- Former call signs: WYAI (1984–1986); WLRM (1986–1995)

Technical information
- Licensing authority: FCC
- Facility ID: 48646
- Class: D
- ERP: 5,000 watts day
- Transmitter coordinates: 32°25′36″N 90°12′19″W
- Translator: 102.1 W271DF (Jackson)

Links
- Public license information: Public file; LMS

WIIN (780 AM) is a radio station licensed to serve Ridgeland, Mississippi. The station is owned by The Radio People and licensed to New South Radio, Inc. The station's studios are in Ridgeland, with a transmitter located west of the city along the Natchez Trace Parkway.

== History ==
The station was assigned the WIIN call letters by the Federal Communications Commission on July 31, 1995.

This station has had many formats over its history. Some of these included: classical, easy listening, inspirational talk, talk shows hosted by African-American hosts and appealing to African-American audiences, all-news, blues, golden oldies pop, all-Spanish speaking, big band, talk shows hosted by female hosts appealing to female audiences, and Southern-gospel.

Until 2009, the station had been affiliated with God's Country Radio Network.

In recent years, the station has been "on and off" the air at sporadic intervals. In June 2009, WIIN was shut down. By May 2010, however, WIIN had returned to the air as a simulcast of WYOY. On July 14, 2010, the station once again went dark. On June 22, 2011 WIIN returned to the air simulcasting country-formatted WUSJ 96.3 FM.

In November 2012, the station played all-Christmas music and simulcast with translator W226BS 93.1 FM in Cedar Hills/Jackson. On January 6 and 7, 2013, the station began the day with Christmas music and all-Beatles music. Since January 7, 2013, the station started playing all-Beatles music.

On June 16, 2016 WIIN changed their format to sports after that format moved from WSFZ 930 AM Jackson, MS, which went silent.

On October 10, 2016 WIIN changed their format from sports to a simulcast of classic country-formatted WJXN-FM 100.9 FM, branded as "100.9 The Legend".

On July 31, 2017 WIIN switched its simulcast from WJXN-FM 100.9 Utica to WHJT 93.5 FM Kearney Park.

In late December 2017 WIIN dropped its simulcast with WHJT and launched a blues format, branded as Blues 93.1.

On July 14, 2021, WIIN changed its format from blues (which had continued on W225BK, now fed via WHJT-HD2) to rhythmic oldies, branded as 102-1 The Box.

On September 11, 2024, WIIN changed its format from rhythmic oldies and back to blues.

On January 1, 2026, WIIN ceased operations and went silent.

== Translators ==
In addition to the main station, WIIN is relayed by an FM translator to widen its broadcast area. The FM translators are allowed to broadcast 24 hours a day, unlike the main WIIN signal.

Broadcast translator for WIIN
Call sign	Frequency	City of license	FID	ERP (W)	HAAT	Class	FCC info
W271DF	102.1 FM	Jackson, Mississippi	202754	60	130 m (427 ft)	D	LMS
