= 1929 in the arts =

The following pages detail more information about 1929 in the arts:

- 1929 in art
- 1929 in film
- 1929 in literature
- 1929 in poetry
- 1929 in television
- 1929 in radio
- 1929 in music
- 1929 in architecture
