= WSLI =

WSLI may refer to:

- WSLI (AM), a radio station (1480 AM) licensed to serve Kentwood, Michigan, United States
- WSLI-FM, a radio station (90.9 FM) licensed to serve Belding, Michigan
- WSFZ, a radio station (930 kHz) in Jackson, Mississippi, that used the call sign WSLI from 1938 to 2003
- WUSJ, a radio station (99.5 MHz) licensed to Madison, Mississippi, that used the call sign WSLI-FM from 1987 to 1990
