= Woad (disambiguation) =

Woad is the common name of Isatis tinctoria, a flowering plant also known as glastum.

Woad may also refer to:

== Culture and entertainment ==
- National Anthem of the Ancient Britons, also known as Woad, a humorous song popular in the 1920s.
- WOAD (AM), an American radio station.
- WRKS, a radio station (105.9 FM) licensed to Pickens, Mississippi, United States, which held the call sign WOAD-FM from January 2004 to July 2009
- Picts, referred to as woads in King Arthur (2004 film), a tribal confederation of peoples who lived in what is today eastern and northern Scotland during the Late Iron Age and early medieval periods,
- “Woads,” a slang term for the popular Wednesday college night at Toad’s Place, a historic nightclub adjacent to Yale University.

== Sport ==
- Lottie Woad (born 2004), English professional golfer

== See also ==
- Wode (disambiguation)
- Woady Yaloak River
