= WJDX =

WJDX may refer to:

- WJDX (AM), a radio station (620 AM) licensed to Jackson, Mississippi, United States
- WJDX-FM, a radio station (105.1 FM) licensed to Kosciusko, Mississippi
