= WYOY =

Radio station in Gluckstadt and Jackson, Mississippi

Gluckstadt, Mississippi; United States
- Broadcast area: Jackson, Mississippi
- Frequency: 101.7 MHz
- Branding: Y101

Programming
- Languages: English
- Format: Top 40/CHR
- Affiliations: Premiere Networks

Ownership
- Owner: The Radio People; (New South Radio, Inc.)
- Sister stations: WHJT, WIIN, WJKK, WUSJ

History
- First air date: January 6, 1976; 49 years ago
- Former call signs: WWLM (1976–1980); WDGM (1980–1983); WZXQ (1983–1986); WEQZ (1986–1989); WLIN (1989–1996)
- Call sign meaning: Y is used in "Y101" branding

Technical information
- Licensing authority: FCC
- Facility ID: 48647
- Class: C2
- ERP: 50,000 watts
- HAAT: 139 meters (456 ft)
- Transmitter coordinates: 32.427°N 90.206°W

Links
- Public license information: Public file; LMS
- Webcast: Listen live
- Website: y101.com

WYOY (101.7 FM, "Y101") is a Top 40/CHR station in Jackson, Mississippi. WYOY debuted in September 1996, and gave the Jackson area its first Top 40 station since 1993. Its studios are located in Ridgeland and the transmitter site is in Raymond.

== History ==
Originally licensed to Canton, Mississippi, Lles Communications put WWLM on the air January 6, 1976, but only for a short time. Issues with the construction permit prompted the station to go dark later that year. After Lles transferred the station to Donald G. Manuel in 1980, it returned in 1981 as WDGM, airing classical music.

WDGM flipped to a rock format on July 7, 1982, going by the name "Rock 102". The rock, however, would be short-lived. On September 10, a fire destroyed the station's temporary studios in a mobile home. It was the second in a series of fires at rock radio stations in Mississippi, including a deliberately set March 1982 blaze at a station in Lexington and a January 1983 fire that consumed the transmitter of WQMV in Vicksburg.

In the wake of the fire, the station filed to relocate and change its city of license from Canton to Gluckstadt. That allowed Rock 102 to return on April 14, 1983, under new WZXQ call letters, using a tower on Livingston Road in Jackson.

Jackson Radio, Inc., sold WZXQ and WYAI (780 AM) to Exchequer Communications for $700,000 in late 1985. When the station shifted from rock to adult contemporary as "EZ Rock" in 1986, the call letters were changed to WEQZ to match. WEQZ also became the local carrier for Ole Miss athletics, an upgrade over their former station in Jackson, WZRX (1590 AM). In late 1988, WEQZ flipped to classic rock as "Q-102".

In February 1989, WLIN, an easy listening outlet at 95.5 FM, flipped to Top 40/CHR as WOHT, leaving a group of highly vocal listeners upset. As a result, after a strong response to a set of "Do you miss WLIN?" ads the station placed in local newspapers—receiving nearly 5,000 replies—WEQZ dropped its classic rock format and flipped to the format, complete with the WLIN call letters, in March. As the Jackson radio market consolidated, by 1992, it was the last station not involved in a local marketing agreement with another, though this did not last; New South Radio, which had begun programming WLIN under LMA, bought it and the associated AM outright in 1994. As the 1990s progressed, WLIN segued into a soft adult contemporary format.

Previous logo

In August 1996, New South Radio flipped WLIN to its current Top 40/CHR format, adopting the call letters WYOY.
