= WRXW =

WRXW may refer to:

- WRXW-LP, a low-power radio station (92.7 FM) licensed to serve Winter Park, Florida, United States
- WJAI, a radio station (93.9 FM) licensed to serve Pearl, Mississippi, United States, which held the call sign WRXW from 2002 to 2012
