= WODE =

WODE may refer to:

- WODE-FM, a radio station in Easton, Pennsylvania, USA
- Wode, surname

== See also ==
- Wood (surname), sometimes spelled Wode
- Woad or Isatis tinctoria, a plant source of blue dye
- WOAD (AM), a radio station in Jackson, Mississippi, USA
