= WTYX =

WTYX may refer to:

- WTYX-LP, a low-power radio station (97.1 FM) licensed to serve Titusville, Florida, United States
- WNGZ (AM), a radio station (1490 AM) licensed to serve Watkins Glen, New York, United States, which held the call sign WTYX from 2004 to 2008
- WJLV, a radio station (94.7 FM) licensed to serve Jackson, Mississippi, United States, which held the call sign WTYX from 1979 to 2004
