= WZRX =

WZRX may refer to:

- WZRX-FM, a radio station (107.5 FM) licensed to serve Fort Shawnee, Ohio, USA
- WZRX (AM), a defunct radio station (1590 AM) formerly licensed to Jackson, Mississippi, USA
