= 1929 in radio =

The year 1929 in radio involved some significant events.

== Events ==
- 8 January – CBS purchases New York City radio station WABC from the Atlantic Broadcasting Company.
- 10 January – WTFF (The Fellowship Forum, a station formerly owned by the Ku Klux Klan) in Mt. Vernon, Virginia (modern-day WFED) changes its call letters to WJSV. While the call letters are claimed to stand for "Jesus Saves Virginia", they actually stand for James S. Vance, a Grand Wizard in the state and publisher of the station's owner, "The Fellowship Forum" (a shell organization for the KKK). Vance arranges an affiliation deal with CBS Radio, which also involves operations and programming for WJSV..
- Early – Halloween Martin begins hosting Musical Clock on KYW in Chicago, the first woman to host her own morning radio show.
- 29 October – Radio Moscow makes its first foreign language broadcast, in German.

== Debuts ==
- (undated) – The Chase and Sanborn Hour debuts on NBC.
- 14 January – Empire Builders debuts on NBC-Blue.
- 17 January – Aunt Jemima debuts on CBS.
- January – George Gershwin's An American in Paris
- 15 July – Music & the Spoken Word on KSL and the CBS radio network, the longest-running continuous network radio program in the US.
- 19 August – Amos 'n Andy debuts on the NBC Blue radio network.
- 1 October – Blackstone Plantation debuts on CBS.
- 24 October – Fleischmann's Yeast Hour, starring Rudy Vallee, debuts on NBC.
- 6 November – Week in Westminster debuts on the BBC Home Service; it will still be running more than 90 years later.
- 20 November – The Rise of the Goldbergs (later called just The Goldbergs), starring Gertrude Berg, debuts on NBC.

== Births ==
- 23 January – Myron Cope (died 2008), American sports journalist, radio personality and sports broadcaster best known for being the voice of the Pittsburgh Steelers.
- 14 March – Bob Grant (died 2013), American conservative talk radio host.
- 27 April – Derek Chinnery (died 2015), British radio controller.
- 20 August – Tom Clay (died 1995), American radio personality and disc jockey.
- 25 September – Ronnie Barker (died 2015), English comic actor.
- 25 November – Tim Gudgin (died 2017), English sports results announcer.
- 29 November – Derek Jameson (died 2012), English newspaper editor and broadcaster.
- 30 November – Dick Clark (died 2012), American television and radio personality, game show host and businessman, chairman and CEO of Dick Clark Productions.
- 5 December – Richard Beebe (died 1998), American radio personality and comedian (The Credibility Gap).
- 28 December – Brian Redhead (died 1994), English radio news presenter.
