= WSFZ =

- Jackson, Mississippi; United States
- Broadcast area: Jackson, Mississippi
- Frequency: 930 kHz
- Branding: Jackson's BIN 98.1

Programming
- Format: Black-oriented news
- Affiliations: Black Information Network

Ownership
- Owner: iHeartMedia; (iHM Licenses, LLC)
- Sister stations: WJDX; WJDX-FM; WSTZ-FM; WMSI-FM; WHLH

History
- First air date: September 1938
- Former call signs: WSLI (1938–2003)
- Former frequencies: 1420 kHz (1938–1941); 1450 kHz (1941–1946)

Technical information
- Licensing authority: FCC
- Facility ID: 62049
- Class: D
- Power: 3,700 watts day; 60 watts night
- Transmitter coordinates: 32°23′42″N 90°9′14″W
- Translator: 98.1 W251DB (Jackson)

Links
- Public license information: Public file; LMS
- Webcast: Listen live (via iHeartRadio)
- Website: jackson.binnews.com

WSFZ (930 AM) is a radio station licensed to serve Jackson, Mississippi. The station is owned by iHeartMedia and as of December 1, 2020, WSFZ is broadcasting an African-American oriented all-news format.

== History ==
WSLI signed on in September 1938, becoming Jackson's second radio station. It was owned by, and named for, the Standard Life Insurance Company. It began broadcasting from studios located in the Robert E. Lee Hotel. The transmitter was located on High Street, near the Pearl River. WSLI was affiliated with the NBC Blue Network. L.M. Sepaugh was named the first manager. WSLI had the distinction of employing Mississippi's first female announcers, Nancy Chambers and Virginia Metz.The station was originally located at 1420 kHz, moving to 1450 kHz in 1941 upon NARBA reallocation and then to 930 kHz in 1946.

WSLI expanded into television in 1954 when it started WSLI-TV channel 12. WSLI-TV was merged with WJTV, then on channel 25, the next year, operating on WSLI's channel 12 license but with the WJTV call sign. Thereafter the call sign WSLI solely identified the radio station until 2003. In this time, the studios of the radio station were located next door to WJTV off Robinson Road in southwest Jackson. Its transmitter, however, was relocated to a site north of the Jackson city limits accessible from North State Street (formerly Highway 51). The four-tower array and transmitter building remained in that location up until 1995 when the site was developed into a shopping center facing Interstate 55.

For most of its history, WSLI featured the morning show of "Farmer" Jim Neal and the Feist Dog, which was the top rated radio program in Jackson for over 40 years. Hank Williams performed live on WSLI's Farm Jim Show on February 21, 1950. Bob Rall was credited for founding one of the first "talk shows" in Jackson in 1953. In most of the 1970s and early 1980s, WSLI was the home of the duo of Bob Rall and Alan Simmons in the highest-radio program in the afternoons. Simmons' son Scott is now an anchor/reporter for Jackson TV station WAPT.

In the 1990s, the station was sold to Mississippi College (MC) as a sister station to then MC-owned WHJT. In 1998, Russ Robinson secured a deal to buy the station and moved WSLI off-campus. Finding office space in Clinton, Robinson said a large majority of the equipment was obsolete and the station pretty much started from scratch.

The station has been assigned the WSFZ call sign by the Federal Communications Commission since November 26, 2003. WSFZ programs previously broadcast included The Rick and Bubba Show, The Dan Patrick Show, The Young Guns, and programming from NBC Sports Radio. WSFZ also broadcast Jackson Academy athletics.

In May 2016, SportsRad, Inc. sold WSFZ to New South Radio for $1. On October 10, 2016, WSFZ returned to the air with a simulcast of classic country-formatted WJXN-FM, branded as "100.9 The Legend". On July 31, 2017, WSFZ switched its simulcast from WJXN-FM to WHJT.

In late December 2017, WSFZ dropped its simulcast with WHJT and began stunting with a repeat Neil Diamond's "Cherry, Cherry". In January 2018, the station dropped "Cherry, Cherry" replacing it with a loop of Robin Thicke's "Blurred Lines".

On July 24, 2020, New South Radio announced plans to sell WSFZ to SSR Communications. As of September 23, 2020, SSR Communications officially owned WSFZ, as well as its translator, W296DD.

On December 1, 2020, iHeartMedia acquired WSFZ and flipped it from talk to an all-news format with programming from the Black Information Network. The acquisition was consummated on March 9, 2021.
