= Wode =

Wode is a surname. Notable people with the surname include:

- Peter Atte Wode (fl. c. 1325–1382), English judge
- Thomas Wode (died 1502), British judge
- Thomas Wode (MP) (by 1469–1532), English politician

== See also ==
- WODE (disambiguation)
- Woad (disambiguation)
