= WSTZ-FM =

- Vicksburg, Mississippi; United States
- Broadcast area: Jackson, Mississippi
- Frequency: 106.7 MHz
- Branding: Z106.7

Programming
- Format: Classic rock

Ownership
- Owner: iHeartMedia; (iHM Licenses, LLC)
- Sister stations: WJDX, WJDX-FM, WMSI-FM, WHLH, WSFZ

History
- First air date: April 1, 1970
- Former call signs: WKYV-FM (1970–1986)

Technical information
- Licensing authority: FCC
- Facility ID: 37177
- Class: C
- ERP: 85,000 watts
- HAAT: 575 meters (1,886 ft)
- Transmitter coordinates: 32°12′49.50″N 90°22′56.30″W

Links
- Public license information: Public file; LMS
- Webcast: Listen live (via iHeartRadio)
- Website: z106.iheart.com

WSTZ-FM (106.7 FM, "Z106.7") is a classic rock music formatted radio station in Jackson, Mississippi, but is licensed to Vicksburg, Mississippi. WSTZ is owned by iHeartMedia (formerly Clear Channel Communications until September 2014). WSTZ serves Jackson and surrounding area with an ERP of 85,000 watts. Its studios are located in Northwest Jackson and the transmitter site is in Raymond.

== Programming ==
WSTZ is the Jackson affiliate for Walton & Johnson, a syndicated morning show from sister station KPRC (AM) in Houston. Sundays feature "Sunday Brunch" in the morning, "Christian the Drunken Fool" in the afternoon, and "Flashback" in the evening. On Tuesdays is "Twofer Tuesdays", in which two songs by the same band are played one after another.
