= WHJT =

Radio station in Kearney Park–Jackson, Mississippi

- Kearney Park, Mississippi; United States
- Broadcast area: Jackson, Mississippi
- Frequency: 93.5 MHz (HD Radio)
- Branding: 93.5 The Legend

Programming
- Language: English
- Format: Classic country
- Subchannels: HD2: Alternative rock Rock 93.1

Ownership
- Owner: New South Radio, Inc. (since 2017)
- Sister stations: WIIN, WJKK, WUSJ, WYOY

History
- First air date: 1974; 52 years ago
- Call sign meaning: Hollis and Julia Todd (station founders)

Technical information
- Licensing authority: FCC
- Facility ID: 43180
- Class: C3
- ERP: 12,000 watts
- HAAT: 114 meters (374 ft)
- Transmitter coordinates: 32°26′49″N 90°18′8″W
- Translator: HD2: 93.1 W225BK (Cedar Hills)

Links
- Public license information: Public file; LMS
- Webcast: Listen Live; HD2: Listen Live
- Website: 935thelegend.com rock931jackson.com (HD2)

WHJT (93.5 FM, 93.5 The Legend) is an American radio station licensed to serve Kearney Park, Mississippi, United States. The station was owned and operated by Clinton-based Mississippi College from 1974 to 2017. Its studios and transmitter were based on campus from the Aven Fine Arts Building.

In March, 2017, Mississippi College sold WHJT to New South Radio. The station's new 12,000-watt transmitter is located off Highway 49, in Pocahontas. Its new studio is located at 265 Highpoint Drive, in Ridgeland.

WHJT had previously broadcast a contemporary Christian format to the Jackson, Mississippi, area from Easter Sunday 1989 until midnight on July 31, 2017. On July 31, WHJT changed its format from Christian contemporary to classic country, and is now branded as 93.5 The Legend (format moved from Flinn Broadcasting-owned WJXN-FM 100.9 Utica, which began stunting).

The station was assigned the call sign WHJT by the Federal Communications Commission (FCC).

== WHJT-HD2 ==
On July 14, 2021 WHJT launched a blues format on its HD2 subchannel, branded as Blues 93.1. (Blues had moved from WIIN 780 AM Ridgeland, which flipped to rhythmic oldies.)

On September 16, 2024, WHJT-HD2 dropped its blues format, and began stunting with Christmas music as Santa 93.1. (Technically, blues had returned to WIIN.)

After a few hours of stunting with Christmas music, WHJT-HD2 launched an alternative rock format, branded as Rock 93.1.
