= WMSI-FM =

Coordinates: 32.214°N 90.382°W

- Jackson, Mississippi; United States
- Broadcast area: Jackson, Mississippi
- Frequency: 102.9 MHz
- Branding: Miss 103

Programming
- Format: Country
- Affiliations: Premiere Networks; WJTV

Ownership
- Owner: iHeartMedia, Inc.; (iHM Licenses, LLC)
- Sister stations: WJDX; WJDX-FM; WSTZ-FM; WSFZ; WHLH

History
- First air date: 1948 (as WJDX-FM)
- Former call signs: WJDX-FM (1948–1973); WZZQ (1973–1981); WMSI (1981–1982)
- Call sign meaning: Mississippi

Technical information
- Licensing authority: FCC
- Facility ID: 59822
- Class: C
- ERP: 100,000 watts
- HAAT: 575 meters (1,886 ft)

Links
- Public license information: Public file; LMS
- Webcast: Listen live (via iHeartRadio)
- Website: miss103.iheart.com

WMSI-FM (102.9 MHz, "Miss 103") is a radio station in Jackson, Mississippi, and owned by iHeartMedia. WMSI's signal covers a roughly 90-mile (140 km) radius around the city with an ERP of 100,000 watts. It is Mississippi's primary entry point for the Emergency Alert System.

== History ==
The station began in 1948 as WJDX-FM, an FM sister to WJDX (620 AM), broadcasting easy listening music in the early 1960s. In 1968, WJDX-FM switched to a progressive rock format, calling itself "WJDX, the Rock of Jackson" and becoming one of the first stations in the South to adopt what was then considered an underground format. Initially, deejays were granted complete control over the playlist, but a fairly loose rotation system was gradually imposed over the first few years. In 1973, the callsign was changed to WZZQ. By this time, the format had evolved into a local version of album-oriented rock (AOR), influenced but never restricted by Radio & Records weekly published music charts for that format. Mississippi artists such as B.B. King, Muddy Waters, Greg "Fingers" Taylor and Paul Davis were played, and occasionally saw their songs achieve local hit status. The ZZQ playlist, like AOR in general, imitated top-40 in that it featured hot, recurrent and gold rotations, but the "hits" were album tracks as often as singles, and the so-called "hot rotation" was much looser. Typically six hours or more would pass between successive plays of even the top-10 rock songs.

The WJDX news department maintained a presence on WZZQ, which took newsbreaks at fifteen minutes past every even-numbered hour beginning 6a.m. weekdays, plus two extra morning drivetime newscasts and an extra afternoon drivetime, the last scheduled newsbreak of the day running at 6:15 p.m. WZZQ was the only FM station in Jackson at the time to broadcast so-called skycopter traffic reports. These were not featured regularly, but when traffic was particularly complex Nancy Bell would provide live updates from the WJDX "Flying J".

Sunday nights, newsman Howard Lett hosted a popular call-in talkradio show on WJDX called "Point-CounterPoint". The King Biscuit Flower Hour was another weekend highlight; it featured popular rock musicians recorded in concert. For several years, Sunday nights featured one or two classic radio shows, usually including The Shadow.

In 1981, despite ZZQ's high ratings, new owners switched the station to a country music format, changed the calls to WMSI-FM, and immediately adopted the name "Miss 103".
