= WJKK =

Adult Contemporary radio station in Vicksburg–Jackson, Mississippi

- Vicksburg, Mississippi; United States
- Broadcast area: Jackson and Vicksburg
- Frequency: 98.7 MHz
- Branding: Mix 98.7

Programming
- Language: English
- Format: Adult contemporary
- Affiliations: Compass Media Networks; Premiere Networks

Ownership
- Owner: New South Radio (since 1994)
- Sister stations: WHJT, WIIN, WUSJ, WYOY

History
- First air date: March 19, 1966; 59 years ago
- Former call signs: WQMV (1966–12/1/1986); WCKO (12/1/1986–1989); WIIN (1989–7/6/1995)

Technical information
- Licensing authority: FCC
- Facility ID: 8177
- Class: C1
- ERP: 52,000 watts
- HAAT: 391.4 meters (1,284 ft)
- Transmitter coordinates: 32°11′29″N 90°24′22″W

Links
- Public license information: Public file; LMS
- Webcast: Listen Live
- Website: mix987.com

WJKK (98.7 FM) is a mainstream adult contemporary radio station. Although licensed to Vicksburg, the station serves the Jackson area. During most of November and December, the station flips to All-Christmas music.

The station is currently owned by Meridian-based New South Radio. Its studios are located in Ridgeland and the transmitter site is in Raymond. The station operates with an Effective radiated power (ERP) of 52,000 watts, making it a class C1 station.

== History ==
The station first signed on March 19, 1966. For many years they played a country music format. However, they flipped to a variety of soft rock in 1997, starting a new era for the station.

More recently the station has been becoming more upbeat following a trend of many AC stations across the country.

Previous logo
