= WJDX (AM) =

- Jackson, Mississippi; United States
- Broadcast area: Jackson, Mississippi
- Frequency: 620 kHz
- Branding: AM 620 FM 104.7 WJDX

Programming
- Format: News/talk/sports
- Affiliations: Fox Sports Radio; ABC News Radio; NBC News Radio; Premiere Networks; WJTV

Ownership
- Owner: iHeartMedia, Inc.; (iHM Licenses, LLC)
- Sister stations: WJDX-FM; WSFZ; WSTZ-FM; WMSI-FM; WHLH

History
- First air date: December 7, 1929
- Former call signs: WJDS (1990–1998)

Technical information
- Licensing authority: FCC
- Facility ID: 59817
- Class: B
- Power: 5,000 watts day; 1,000 watts night
- Transmitter coordinates: 32°22′56.52″N 90°11′26.32″W
- Translator: 104.7 W284DT (Jackson)

Links
- Public license information: Public file; LMS
- Webcast: Listen live (via iHeartRadio)
- Website: wjdx.iheart.com

WJDX (620 kHz) is an AM radio station licensed to serve Jackson, Mississippi. The station is owned by iHeartMedia, Inc. (formerly Clear Channel Communications until September 2014) and licensed to iHM Licenses, LLC. It airs a news/talk/sports radio format.

WJDX's logo under its previous sports format

Mississippi Sports This Morning, which is now airing on WJQS, was the station's flagship local program. It aired during WJDX's morning drive slot without interruption from 1998 to 2020. It was hosted by Doug Colson and Jay White. It was the longest-running daily sports talk program in Mississippi radio history.

WJDX also serves as the Jackson home for the New Orleans Saints and NASCAR.

== History ==
The station originally planned to go on the air on November 30, 1929, but due to technical difficulties with its transmitter, it signed on December 7.

In the 1970s and early 1980s, WJDX was a successful Top 40 music station. Prior to that, the station had been a conservative MOR music outlet.

The station was reassigned the WJDX call sign by the Federal Communications Commission (FCC) on October 9, 1998. According to the FCC, the call sign was WJDS from July 6, 1990 to October 8, 1998. Prior to July 6, 1990, the call sign was WJDX since its inception.

On October 3, 2011, WJDX’s format was changed from sports to news/talk.

== Translator ==
Call sign	Frequency	City of license	FID	ERP (W)	HAAT	Class	Transmitter coordinates	FCC info
W284DT	104.7 FM	Jackson, Mississippi	91541	250	141.2 m (463 ft)	D	32°24′27.5″N 90°9′3.4″W	LMS
