= WUSJ =

Madison, Mississippi; United States
- Broadcast area: Jackson, Mississippi
- Frequency: 96.3 MHz
- Branding: US96.3

Programming
- Languages: English
- Format: Country

Ownership
- Owner: Digio Strategies; (New South Radio, Inc.)
- Sister stations: WHJT, WIIN, WJKK, WYOY

History
- First air date: September 16, 1966; 58 years ago (as WSLI-FM)
- Former call signs: WSLI-FM (1966–1976); WJFR (1976–1982); WXLY (1982–1983); WYYN (1983–1987); WSLI-FM (1987–1990); WJDX (1990–1998); WKXS (1998–1999)
- Call sign meaning: U.S. (common country station branding), Jackson

Technical information
- Licensing authority: FCC
- Facility ID: 62050
- Class: C0
- ERP: 100,000 watts
- HAAT: 391.4 meters (1,284 ft)
- Transmitter coordinates: 32°11′29″N 90°24′22″W

Links
- Public license information: Public file; LMS
- Webcast: Listen Live
- Website: us963.com

WUSJ (96.3 FM, "US96.3") is a country music radio station licensed to Madison, Mississippi, and serving greater Jackson. The station is owned by Meridian, Mississippi-based Digio Strategies, and licensed to New South Radio, Inc. It airs a country music format. Its studios are located in Ridgeland and the transmitter site is in Raymond.

== History ==
The station first signed on the air on September 16, 1966, as WSLI-FM. The station changed its call letters to WJFR in 1976, with a talk radio format. For a short time from 1982 until 1983, the station became WXLY-FM, running a country MOR format. Retaining the format, the station changed its call letters to WYYN during the year. Its format lasted until 1986 when it dropped country for adult contemporary as "Class-FM". The station also began simulcasting WSLI. In 1990, its call letters changed to WJDX retaining the AC format, and for a short time in 1998, its call letters changed to WKXS. After 12 years in 1999, it permanently returned to a country format, switching their calls to WUSJ on July 13, 1999.

Logo before using its entire frequency in its branding
