= WKXI-FM =

Radio station in Magee, Mississippi

Coordinates: 32.258°N 89.790°W

Magee, Mississippi; United States
- Broadcast area: Jackson, Mississippi
- Frequency: 107.5 MHz
- Branding: Kixie 107.5

Programming
- Format: Urban adult contemporary
- Affiliations: Premiere Networks

Ownership
- Owner: Connoisseur Media; (Alpha Media Licensee LLC)
- Sister stations: WJMI; WJNT; WOAD; WJQS; WRKS

History
- First air date: April 12, 1970
- Former call signs: WSJC-FM (1970–1988); WMJW (1988–1991)
- Call sign meaning: "Kixie"

Technical information
- Licensing authority: FCC
- Facility ID: 50407
- Class: C1
- ERP: 98,000 watts
- HAAT: 290 meters (950 ft)

Links
- Public license information: Public file; LMS
- Webcast: Listen live
- Website: www.wkxi.com

WKXI-FM (107.5 MHz, "Kixie 107") is an urban adult contemporary music formatted radio station licensed to Magee, Mississippi, and serving Jackson. The station is owned by Connoisseur Media, through licensee Alpha Media Licensee LLC. Along with five other sister stations, its studios are located in Ridgeland, a suburb of Jackson, while the transmitter tower is south of Pelahatchie.

== History ==
The Southeast Mississippi Broadcasting Company, which owned WSJC (810 AM) in Magee, received a construction permit on December 15, 1966, for an FM station to serve the same town. By 1968, construction was underway, including on an auxiliary studio for both stations in Mendenhall. The station did not sign on until April 12, 1970; it aired a variety of musical formats and simulcast the AM during the early morning hours.

In 1987, CSB Communications acquired the WSJC stations for $2.2 million. The FM station increased its presence in Jackson by flipping to adult contemporary as WMJW "Majic 107". The format lasted until 1991, when CSB leased the station to Opus Media, which changed the FM to a simulcast of its WKXI and its "soft soul" format; all 16 WMJW employees were laid off.
