= WJNT =

Radio station in Pearl, Mississippi

- Pearl, Mississippi; United States
- Broadcast area: Jackson, Mississippi
- Frequency: 1180 kHz
- Branding: Jackie 96.9

Programming
- Format: Hot adult contemporary
- Affiliations: Compass Media Networks

Ownership
- Owner: Connoisseur Media; (Alpha Media Licensee LLC)
- Sister stations: WJMI; WKXI-FM; WOAD; WRKS; WJQS

History
- First air date: October 28, 1980 (as WPRL)
- Former call signs: WPRL (1980–1981); WKKE (1981–1986)
- Call sign meaning: "Jackson's News-Talk (under previous format and branding)"

Technical information
- Licensing authority: FCC
- Facility ID: 7691
- Class: B
- Power: 50,000 watts day; 10,000 watts critical hours; 500 watts night
- Transmitter coordinates: 32°17′43.5″N 90°6′54.2″W
- Translator: 96.9 W245AH (Jackson)

Links
- Public license information: Public file; LMS
- Webcast: Listen live
- Website: www.jackie969.com

WJNT (1180 AM) is a radio station licensed to Pearl, Mississippi. WJNT is owned by Connoisseur Media through licensee Alpha Media Licensee LLC and its sister stations are WJMI, WKXI-FM, WOAD, WRKS, and WJQS. All six stations have shared studios which are located in Ridgeland, a suburb of Jackson, while the transmitter tower for WJNT is located in Pearl.

WJNT broadcasts a hot adult contemporary format with Compass Media Networks’ Anna & Raven in the mornings, Kelly K from WDJX Louisville in the middays, Christina Kay from WALK-FM Long Island in the afternoons, and XYZ with Erik Zachary at night. WJNT operates at 50,000 watts during the day, 10,000 watts during critical hours and 500 watts at night.

On November 11, 2026, WJNT changed its format from news/talk to hot adult contemporary, branded as “Jackie 96.9”.

Logo before translator sign on during the previous news/talk format.

== FM signal ==
WJNT operated at night on WJNT-FM1 103.9 until June 2017.

WJNT was granted permission for the FM booster due to massive nighttime interference by Cuban stations on 1180 AM, and has been operating a nighttime-only FM booster under special temporary authority from the FCC since December 20, 1999.

Once WJNT-FM1 was turned off, WJNT started simulcasting 24/7 on W245AH, a 135 watt FM translator at 96.9 MHz licensed to Jackson, Mississippi.

Call sign	Frequency	City of license	FID	ERP (W)	Class	Transmitter coordinates	FCC info
W245AH	96.9 FM	Jackson, Mississippi	139924	135	D	32°16′51.5″N 90°17′38.3″W	LMS
