= David H. Nutt =

American lawyer

David H. Nutt is an American lawyer and philanthropist. He is the former richest person in the US state of Mississippi. Nutt graduated from the University of Mississippi in Oxford, Mississippi. A lawyer, Nutt has defended former trial lawyer Richard Scruggs. He has also "represented clients in asbestos, drug, healthcare fraud and environmental litigation."

In 1999, he agreed to donate $14.5 million to the University of Mississippi, which named its David H. Nutt Auditorium in his honor.

Nutt lives in Ridgeland, Mississippi. He owns the Canadian River Cattle Ranch, a 71,000-acre ranch in Oldham County, Texas. As of 2014, he was worth an estimated US$880 million.
