= Veritas School (Ridgeland, Mississippi) =

The Veritas School

Location
- Coordinates: 32.4498936°N 90.1532083°W

Information
- Type: Private
- Opened: 1998
- Closed: 2015

The Veritas School, also known simply as Veritas, was a private Christian school in Ridgeland, Mississippi (United States). Located on the Madison/Ridgeland line in the Jackson metro area, The Veritas School was a 6th – 12th grade Christian school, and later began enrolling elementary students. The school's stated mission was to equip the next generation of Christian leaders to think and live biblically. The Veritas School was not affiliated with any individual church or denomination. The Veritas School closed in 2015.

== Information ==
The Veritas School was located at 1202 Highland Colony Parkway in Ridgeland, MS. It was a Christian school that followed a covenantal approach to admissions (at least one parent/guardian must be a professing Christian in order to seek enrollment for a student) and adhered to a classical education method and curriculum. Classical elements included Latin, Logic, Worldview, and Rhetoric classes, and students are encouraged to apply biblical concepts to other subjects across the curriculum. The school also held a non-denominational statement of faith comprising general evangelical tenets. Teachers and staff were required to affirm the statement of faith.

== History ==
Conceived in 1994 and officially established in 1998, Veritas was a non-denominational private Christian school serving the greater Jackson area. The campus was located at the former Colonial Heights Baptist Church building on Old Canton Road in Jackson until 2009, and then in facilities shared with Highland Colony Baptist Church, at 1202 Highland Colony Parkway, Ridgeland MS.

== Accreditation and Affiliation ==
Veritas was accredited by the Mississippi Association of Independent Schools (MAIS), formerly the Mississippi Private School Association. Veritas was also a member school in the Association of Classical and Christian Schools (ACCS), the Southern Association of Independent Schools (SAIS), and the Southern Association of Colleges and Schools (SACS).

== Sports ==
The mascot of Veritas was the Lion. The school colors were green and white.
