= WJAI =

Pearl, Mississippi; United States
- Broadcast area: Jackson, Mississippi
- Frequency: 93.9 MHz
- Branding: Air1

Programming
- Format: Christian worship
- Affiliations: Air1

Ownership
- Owner: Educational Media Foundation
- Sister stations: WJLV, WJXN

History
- First air date: November 1994
- Former call signs: WLUE (1992–1994); WVIV (1994–2002); WRXW (2002–2012)
- Call sign meaning: W Jackson's Air One (using Roman numeral for one, I)

Technical information
- Licensing authority: FCC
- Facility ID: 6212
- Class: C3
- ERP: 25,000 watts
- HAAT: 100 meters
- Transmitter coordinates: 32°14′6.00″N 89°53′46.00″W

Links
- Public license information: Public file; LMS
- Webcast: Listen Live
- Website: air1.com

WJAI (93.9 FM) is a radio station broadcasting a Christian worship format from Air1. Licensed to Pearl, Mississippi, the station serves the Jackson, Mississippi area. The station is currently owned by the Educational Media Foundation (EMF).

== History ==
logo under previous format

In July, 2008, Jacksonville, Florida-based Backyard Broadcasting sold WRXW to Inner City Broadcasting Corporation. In August of that year, WRXW briefly stunted, making its listeners think the station was about to switch to classic rock, but in actuality, the only on-air change WRXW had made, under orders from Inner City, was dropping the Dallas-based, nationally syndicated morning show, Lex and Terry, which was replaced with The Morning Wood, a "live and local" morning show featuring program director Brad Stevens and Mandy Scott. Several on air staff changes were also made: Mandy Scott hosted middays, Joe Knight in afternoons, and Moose at night. Since then, the sale/LMA to Inner City fell through, and WRXW moved back to its original mobile home studio in a field under control of Backyard Broadcasting and subsequently started cleaning house due to money troubles.

In late 2011 the station would be sold to EMF. On January 17, 2012 at Midnight, EMF took control of the station, which changed its format to the Air 1 Radio Network, under the calls of WJAI.

Rock 93.9 continued as an internet-only radio station. But on September 30, 2015, Rock939.com went silent. Its owner, Brad Stevens, had an increasingly busy schedule (work, family, etc.), so he simply did not have enough time to run his now-defunct internet-only radio station.
