= WJQS =

Radio station in Jackson, Mississippi

Coordinates: 32°19′12.5″N 90°11′25.3″W

- Jackson, Mississippi; United States
- Frequency: 1400 kHz
- Branding: 1400 The Fan

Programming
- Format: Sports radio
- Affiliations: Fox Sports Radio; Infinity Sports Network; Dallas Cowboys; Mississippi State Bulldogs

Ownership
- Owner: Connoisseur Media; (Alpha Media Licensee LLC)
- Sister stations: WJNT; WJMI; WKXI-FM; WOAD; WRKS

History
- First air date: June 29, 1947; 78 years ago
- Former call signs: WJQS (1947–1984); WOAD (1984–1996); WKXI (1996–2008)

Technical information
- Licensing authority: FCC
- Facility ID: 50409
- Class: C
- Power: 1,000 watts unlimited
- Translator: 106.3 W292EX (Jackson)

Links
- Public license information: Public file; LMS
- Webcast: Listen live
- Website: www.wjqsthefan.com

WJQS (1400 AM) is a sports talk radio station in Jackson, Mississippi, owned by Connoisseur Media through licensee Alpha Media Licensee LLC. Along with five other sister stations, its studios are located in Ridgeland, a suburb of Jackson, while the transmitter tower is in Jackson just north of downtown.

== History ==
For many years, this station was called "Fun Country - 1400 WJQS". Television news anchor Bert Case began his career in broadcasting at this station.

In the 1960s, the station's studios were moved to a small building on Terry Road, near Jackson State University. Ann Zimmerman owned the station, and the format was country-Western music. News was broadcast every 20 minutes.

In 1983, WJQS was sold to John Pembroke who switched the call letters to WOAD and changed the format to black gospel. In 1988 the station was sold to Holt Communications, the owners of WJMI and WOKJ at that time. In 1996, the call letters and format were swapped with WKXI (1300 AM). WKXI on 1400 aired a party blues/oldies format before being entering into a local marketing agreement with Pollack Broadcasting in 2008.

From October 2008 to June 2009, WJQS' format was business talk, and its nickname was "The Money Station". In June 2009, the station switched to adult standards as an affiliate of Music of Your Life. From January 2009 to February 2011, WJQS broadcast the Radio Shopping Show in conjunction with these formats.

On February 25, 2011, WJQS became "Oldies 1400" and started airing a 1950s-1970s oldies format. More recently, WJQS gradually evolved to 1960s-1980s oldies. On January 1, 2017, the station switched from oldies to sports as "The Fan", with programming from CBS Sports Radio.
