= WJXN-FM =

Radio station in Utica, Mississippi

Coordinates: 32.053765°N 90.339813°W

Utica, Mississippi; United States
- Broadcast area: Jackson, Mississippi
- Frequency: 100.9 MHz

Programming
- Format: Worship music
- Network: Air1

Ownership
- Owner: Educational Media Foundation
- Sister stations: WJAI, WJLV

History
- First air date: October 1990; 34 years ago (then at 92.9; moved to 100.9 in December, 1999)
- Former call signs: WJXN-FM (1990–1991); WOAD-FM (1991–1992)
- Former frequencies: 92.9 MHz (1990–1999)
- Call sign meaning: W JaXoN (for Jackson, Mississippi)

Technical information
- Licensing authority: FCC
- Facility ID: 72818
- Class: C2
- ERP: 39,000 watts
- HAAT: 168 meters (551 ft)

Links
- Public license information: Public file; LMS
- Webcast: Listen Live
- Website: air1.com

WJXN-FM (100.9 MHz) is a radio station licensed to Utica, Mississippi, and serving the Jackson area. It airs a worship music format as part of the Air1 radio network. The station is owned by Educational Media Foundation.

WJXN has an effective radiated power (ERP) of 39,000 watts. The transmitter site is in Crystal Springs, Mississippi.

== History ==
In October, 1990, WJXN (then at 92.9 MHz) first signed on the air. It had a Top 40 format and was branded 92.9 The Heat. But The Heat was turned off after just a few months.

In 1991, WJXN switched to oldies. It was branded J92. But that only lasted a year.

In 1992, WJXN made another switch—to country music. It was branded Star 92. Later that year, WJXN started simulcasting WOAD. WOAD's then-owner, Holt Communications, had leased WJXN, and changed the call sign to WOAD-FM.

In December, 1997, WJXN was sold to Flinn Broadcasting.

In December, 1999, WJXN swapped frequencies with WDXO.

For several years, WJXN had been leased by the non-profit Educational Media Foundation and was affiliated with the "K-Love" Christian Contemporary music network until 2012.

On July 26, 2012, the lease was transferred to Meridian, Mississippi-based New South Radio (then doing business as The Radio People). WJXN first switched to adult hits, branded as 100.9 Jack FM.

On March 1, 2014 at midnight, WJXN began stunting. Then on March 3 (after 60 hours of stunting), the station relaunched as classic country-formatted 100.9 The Legend.

In March 2017, New South Radio acquired WHJT from Mississippi College. On July 31 of that year, the classic country format moved to WHJT, with New South Radio terminating its lease on WJXN. Then end of the lease caused WJXN to go silent.

On October 9, 2017, after two months of silence, WJXN returned to the air with classic hip-hop, billing itself as Hot 100.9. During these three months, the station utilized national programming from Westwood One's Classic Hip-Hop network.

On January 5, 2018, WJXN ended its Hot 100.9 classic hip hop phase. WJXN-FM was rebranded as g 100.9 (still having classic hip-hop), this time under a local marketing agreement (LMA) deal with Alpha Media. That company replaced the Westwood One programming with Alpha's in-house presentation, thus putting it in line with Alpha's g-branded stations.

On February 19, 2021, WJXN flipped back to adult hits, again as 100.9 Jack FM. A portion of its signal overlaps with WDXO. At that time, WDXO (licensed to Hazlehurst, with studios located in Brookhaven) also had adult hits, and had been branded 92.9 Jack FM.

On January 1, 2023, WJXN dropped the Jack FM adult hits format, due to Alpha Media's operation of the station coming to an end (as well as low Nielsen audio ratings). WJXN switched to the Educational Media Foundation's Air1 worship music format.

On October 31, 2023, Flinn Broadcasting announced the sale of WJXN to the Educational Media Foundation.

On March 26, 2024, Flinn's sale of WJXN to the Educational Media Foundation consummated.
