= KNOB (FM) =

Coordinates: 38.7355°N 122.8497°W

- Healdsburg, California; United States
- Broadcast area: Santa Rosa, California
- Frequency: 96.7 MHz
- Branding: 96.7 Bob FM

Programming
- Format: Adult hits

Ownership
- Owner: JYH Broadcasting
- Operator: Wine Country Radio

History
- First air date: 2002
- Former call signs: KTOL (2002–2004)
- Call sign meaning: "Turn your KNOB to Bob" (Bob FM slogan)

Technical information
- Licensing authority: FCC
- Facility ID: 79003
- Class: A
- ERP: 2,750 watts
- HAAT: 150 meters (490 ft)

Links
- Public license information: Public file; LMS
- Webcast: Listen live
- Website: 967bob.fm

KNOB (96.7 FM) is a commercial radio station licensed to Healdsburg, California, United States, and serving the Santa Rosa area. Owned by JYH Broadcasting and operated by Wine Country Radio, it airs an adult hits format branded "Bob FM", with studios located on Standish Avenue in Santa Rosa.

KNOB's transmitter is sited off Ridge Ranch Road in Geyserville, California.

== History ==
The station signed on the air in 2002 as KTOL. It has always been owned by JYH Broadcasting. The original general manager was Debbie Morton.

KNOB previously aired an alternative rock format branded as "96X". 96X announced on April 9, 2017, that it no longer have a lease to broadcast on 96.7 KNOB.

On October 4, 2018, KNOB returned to the air with variety hits, branded as "96.7 Bob FM".
