= WJMI =

Radio station in Jackson, Mississippi

Coordinates: 32.208°N 90.414°W

- Jackson, Mississippi; United States
- Broadcast area: Jackson, Mississippi
- Frequency: 99.7 MHz (HD Radio)
- Branding: 99 Jams

Programming
- Language: English
- Format: Mainstream urban

Ownership
- Owner: Connoisseur Media; (Alpha Media Licensee LLC)
- Sister stations: WJNT; WJQS; WKXI-FM; WOAD; WRKS

History
- First air date: July 31, 1967; 59 years ago
- Call sign meaning: Jackson, Mississippi

Technical information
- Licensing authority: FCC
- Facility ID: 50408
- Class: C0
- ERP: 100,000 watts
- HAAT: 323 meters (1,060 ft)

Links
- Public license information: Public file; LMS
- Webcast: Listen live
- Website: www.wjmi.com

WJMI (99.7 FM) is a radio station licensed to Jackson, Mississippi, United States, with a mainstream urban musical format. The station is owned by Connoisseur Media through licensee Alpha Media Licensee LLC. Along with five other sister stations, its studios are located in Ridgeland, a suburb of Jackson, while the transmitter tower is south of Raymond.

== Station history ==
The station began in 1967 as an FM sister to station WRBC and was owned by the Rebel Broadcasting Company. Most of the disc jockeys who were on WRBC took shifts on the FM station, and hosting a shift on the FM station was used to test new talent for WRBC.

Among the more famous voices to be heard on WJMI were Bob Pittman (founder of MTV), Walt Grayson (later a television weatherperson for two Jackson television stations), and Mary Lewis.

The station then broadcast from 7 a.m. until midnight. It was affiliated with the ABC-FM news network and broadcast the news each hour at fifteen minutes past the hour with local news following.

The station began as an easy listening station with some of the talent later recalling that every version of "Spanish Eyes" was played on the station. By the 1970s, the station had evolved into an adult contemporary station which played album-cuts from such singer-songwriters as Carole King, Carly Simon, Paul Simon, and Helen Reddy, bubblegum music (such as David Cassidy, Bobby Sherman, and the Partridge Family, and middle-of-the-road artists such as Johnny Mathis, Vikki Carr, and Andy Williams. Instrumental music and soft easy-listening music was played on the station, especially preceding the news.

WJMI was one of the first stations to employ female disc jockeys.

There were occasionally contests for concerts (such as the 1971 State Fair appearance of actor-singer Bobby Sherman).

On April 1, 1973, WJMI was sold to new owners, who then flipped into a CHR/urban contemporary format (also known as "CHUrban", which was the forerunner to what could become the rhythmic contemporary format) as "Jackson's JMI 100 FM". Over time, WJMI would evolve into its current mainstream urban format as "99 Jams".
