= WHLH =

Radio station in Jackson, Mississippi

Coordinates: 32.241°N 90.404°W

- Jackson, Mississippi; United States
- Broadcast area: Jackson, Mississippi
- Frequency: 95.5 MHz
- Branding: Hallelujah 95.5

Programming
- Format: Urban gospel
- Affiliations: WJTV

Ownership
- Owner: iHeartMedia, Inc.; (iHM Licenses, LLC)
- Sister stations: WJDX, WJDX-FM, WSTZ-FM, WMSI-FM, WSFZ

History
- First air date: November 19, 1973 (as WLIN)
- Former call signs: WLIN (1973–1989); WOHT (1989–1992); WKQB (1992–1993); WKTF (1993–1999); WDBT (1999–2004)
- Call sign meaning: W HalleLujaH

Technical information
- Licensing authority: FCC
- Facility ID: 59825
- Class: C
- ERP: 100,000 watts
- HAAT: 451 metres (1,480 ft)

Links
- Public license information: Public file; LMS
- Webcast: Listen Live
- Website: hallelujah955.iheart.com

WHLH (95.5 FM) is an urban gospel radio station in Jackson, Mississippi. It is owned by iHeartMedia, Inc. (formerly Clear Channel Communications until September 2014) and branded "Hallelujah 95.5". The station used to be a CHR station known as WDBT "95.5 The Beat." Its studios are located in Northwest Jackson and the transmitter site is in Raymond. The station is also the only 100,000 watts gospel radio station in Mississippi.
