= WJLV =

K-LOVE radio station in Jackson, Mississippi

Coordinates: 32.282°N 90.295°W

- Jackson, Mississippi; United States
- Broadcast area: Jackson, Mississippi
- Frequency: 94.7 MHz
- Branding: K-LOVE

Programming
- Format: Christian contemporary

Ownership
- Owner: Educational Media Foundation
- Sister stations: WJAI, WJXN

History
- First air date: August 10, 1971 (as WKXI)
- Former call signs: WKXI (1971–1978); WKXI-FM (1978); WTYX (1978–2004); WWJK (2004–2012)
- Call sign meaning: "Jackson's K-Love"

Technical information
- Licensing authority: FCC
- Facility ID: 27509
- Class: C
- ERP: 100,000 watts
- HAAT: 340 meters (1,120 ft)

Links
- Public license information: Public file; LMS
- Webcast: Listen Live
- Website: klove.com

WJLV (94.7 FM) is a radio station broadcasting a contemporary Christian music format from K-LOVE. Licensed to Jackson, Mississippi, the station is currently owned by the Educational Media Foundation (EMF).

== History ==
In 1978, WKXI became WTYX. From September, 1978 to March, 1990, WTYX' format was Top 40/CHR, and had been branded 94TYX (TYX was pronounced tiks).

In March, 1990, WTYX flipped to oldies, and was branded Oldies 94.

In September, 1994, WTYX flipped to all rock & roll oldies and had been branded Arrow 94.

In 2002, local ownership of WTYX ended. Proteus Investments sold WTYX (as well as its sister station, WVIV) to the Jacksonville-based Backyard Broadcasting.

On Friday, September 3, 2004 (at 3pm CDT), under the direction of program director Russ Schell, WTYX flipped to adult hits. The station had been branded 94-7 Jack FM. On September 14 of that year, the call sign had been changed to WWJK. It was the first US Jack FM station east of the Mississippi River.

Schell left WWJK in 2005. He was replaced by Don Wayne. Angela Roland managed the traffic.

In July, 2008, after six years in the Jackson radio market, Backyard Broadcasting sold WWJK to Meridian-based New South Radio. But the deal was called off shortly thereafter.

In November, 2011, Backyard Broadcasting sold both WRXW and WWJK to the Educational Media Foundation.

On January 17, 2012, after approximately seven years as 94-7 Jack FM, WWJK changed formats to Contemporary Christian (K-Love) after being sold to EMF.

The last song played on Jack FM was Goodbye by Night Ranger.

WWJK was the rated fourth by Arbitron before the format change.

On February 17, 2012, WWJK changed to its current call sign, WJLV. The station replaced WJXN-FM (now owned by the Educational Media Foundation) as the local K-Love affiliate.
