= WLYB =

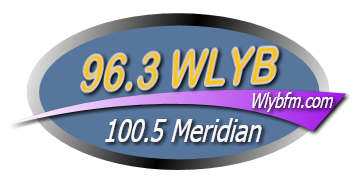
- Livingston, Alabama; United States
- Broadcast area: Livingston, York, Demopolis, Alabama
- Frequency: 96.3 MHz
- Branding: 96.3 WLYB 100.5 Meridian

Programming
- Language: English
- Format: Adult Contemporary

Ownership
- Owner: Damon Collins; (Blackbelt Broadcasting, Inc.)

History
- First air date: November 26, 2013
- Call sign meaning: Livingston York Blackbelt

Technical information
- Licensing authority: FCC
- Facility ID: 189541
- Class: A
- ERP: 3,400 watts
- HAAT: 100 meters (330 ft)
- Transmitter coordinates: 32°37′34.3″N 88°12′03.3″W
- Translators: 100.5 W263CF (Meridian, MS)

Links
- Public license information: Public file; LMS
- Webcast: Listen Live

WLYB (96.3 FM) is an American radio station serving the community of Livingston, the county seat of Sumter County, Alabama and Meridian, Mississippi. Owned by Blackbelt Broadcasting, Inc., a company wholly owned by Damon L. Collins, WLYB has a transmitter located off McDowell Industrial Park Road, just outside the Livingston city limit, and studio facilities on Monroe Street in downtown.

WLYB has a translator in Meridian, Mississippi, W263CF (100.5 MHz).

== History ==
In June 2011, Damon L. Collins of Foley, Alabama, applied to the Federal Communications Commission (FCC) for a construction permit for a new broadcast radio station. The FCC granted this permit on September 9, 2011, with a scheduled expiration date of September 9, 2014. The new station was assigned call sign "WLYB" on September 21, 2011.

In November 2011, Damon L. Collins filed application to transfer the construction permit for WLYB to a new company called Blackbelt Broadcasting, Inc. Collins is the sole owner of Blackbelt Broadcasting. The FCC approved the transfer on November 19, 2011, and formal consummation took place on January 10, 2012.

On November 26, 2013, following a stunt with a commercial-less loop of TV theme songs, WLYB signed on with a Rhythmic Hot AC-leaning Variety Hits format using live air staffers, known as just 96.3 WLYB. The first song played on 96.3 WLYB was Love Shack by The B-52's. The music is mostly current-based Rhythmic Pop mixed in with Rhythmic/Old School favorites from 80s, 90s, and 2000s

WLYB FM is also heard on 100.5 FM (W263CF) in Meridian, Mississippi.
