= WRKS =

Radio station in Pickens, Mississippi

- Pickens, Mississippi; United States
- Broadcast area: Jackson, Mississippi
- Frequency: 105.9 MHz
- Branding: ESPN 105.9 The Zone

Programming
- Format: Sports
- Affiliations: ESPN Radio

Ownership
- Owner: Connoisseur Media; (Alpha Media Licensee LLC)
- Sister stations: WJMI; WJNT; WKXI-FM; WOAD; WJQS

History
- First air date: 1980 (as WXMR)
- Former call signs: WXMR (1980–1982); WLTD (1982–1995); WYJS (1995–2004); WOAD-FM (2004–2009); WZNO (2009–2012)
- Call sign meaning: Previously used on the historical "98.7 Kiss FM" (now WEPN-FM) in New York City

Technical information
- Licensing authority: FCC
- Facility ID: 29512
- Class: C2
- ERP: 23,000 watts
- HAAT: 224 meters (735 ft)
- Transmitter coordinates: 32°38′53.5″N 89°59′20.3″W

Links
- Public license information: Public file; LMS
- Webcast: Listen live
- Website: www.thezone1059.com

WRKS (105.9 FM, "The Zone") is a radio station licensed to Pickens, Mississippi, although its studio is located in Ridgeland, Mississippi. Launched on July 2, 2009, the station's format is sports, with programming from ESPN Radio. WRKS is owned by Connoisseur Media through licensee Alpha Media Licensee LLC. Along with five other sister stations, its studios are located in Ridgeland, a suburb of Jackson, while the transmitter tower is in Canton.

== History ==
The station started out in 1980 with the call sign WXMR. On June 1, 1982, the call sign was changed to WLTD, then to WYJS on December 15, 1995. On January 16, 2004, the call sign was again changed to WOAD-FM with an urban gospel format as "Power 105.9". On July 3, 2009, the urban gospel format was dropped for a sports format as "The Zone" with the call sign again changing to WZNO.

The station had been owned by Inner City Broadcasting of New York City until Inner City Broadcasting's bankruptcy in the early 2010s, at which time YMF Media took over the station. The WRKS callsign had been used for a New York station on 98.7 FM until its owner, Emmis Communications, flipped to a simulcast of ESPN Radio station WEPN and sold the rights to the WRKS name to YMF, which then transferred it to WZNO.

WRKS and five other YMF Media stations were sold to L&L Broadcast Holdings on September 24, 2013. The purchase price was $9.4 million. On July 1, 2014, L&L merged with sister company Alpha Broadcasting to form Alpha Media. Alpha Media merged with Connoisseur Media on September 4, 2025.
