= 1929 in television =

The year 1929 in television involved some significant events. Below is a list of television-related events during 1929.

== Global television events ==
Month	Day	Event
June	27	Herbert Ives and his colleagues at Bell Telephone Laboratories in New York City demonstrate color mechanical television (this was first achieved by John Logie Baird the previous year). The 50-line color images are of a bouquet of roses and an American flag. The images are transmitted between New York and Washington, D.C.
August	20	First transmissions of Baird's 30-line television system by the BBC in London.
August	25	Westinghouse station KDKA in Pittsburgh, Pennsylvania, begins broadcasting movies on a daily basis, 60 lines per picture, 16 pictures per second.

== Births ==
Date	Name	Notability
January 11	Nicoletta Orsomando	Italy's first TV continuity announcer (died 2021)
January 20	Arte Johnson	U.S. comic actor (Rowan and Martin's Laugh-In) (died 2019)
February 4	Jerry Adler	U.S. actor (The Sopranos) (died 2025)
February 22	Rebecca Schull	U.S. actress (Wings)
March 5	Raymond Allen	U.S. actor (Sanford and Son) (died 2020)
April 3	Lee Leonard	U.S. television personality (died 2018)
April 10	Liz Sheridan	U.S. actress (died 2022)
June 3	Chuck Barris	U.S. game show host (The Dating Game) (died 2017)
June 23	June Carter Cash	U.S. singer and actress (The Johnny Cash Show) (died 2003)
July 5	Katherine Helmond	U.S. actress (Soap, Who's the Boss?) (died 2019)
July 28	Jacqueline Kennedy	35th First Lady of the United States (died 1994)
July 31	Don Murray	U.S. actor (The Outcasts, Knots Landing) (died 2024)
August 17	Julianna McCarthy	U.S. actress (The Young and the Restless)
September 5	Bob Newhart	U.S. comedian and actor (The Bob Newhart Show, Newhart) (died 2024)
September 25	Ronnie Barker	British comedian, half of The Two Ronnies (died 2005)
September 25	Barbara Walters	U.S. journalist and TV personality (died 2022)
October 16	Nicholas von Hoffman	American journalist (died 2018)
October 23	Merv Adelson	American producer (died 2015)
November 2	Rachel Ames	U.S. actress (General Hospital)
November 15	Ed Asner	U.S. actor (The Mary Tyler Moore Show, Lou Grant) (died 2021)
November 20	Jerry Hardin	U.S. actor (The X-Files)
November 25	Jack Hogan	U.S. actor (Combat!) (died 2023)
November 27	Alan Simpson	British comedy scriptwriter (died 2017)
November 28	Berry Gordy	U.S. producer
November 29	Claus Toksvig	Danish foreign correspondent (died 1988)
November 30	Dick Clark	U.S. TV host (American Bandstand) (died 2012)
November 30	Joan Ganz Cooney	U.S. producer (Sesame Street)
December 31	Mies Bouwman	Dutch television presenter (died 2018)
December 31	David Nixon	British magician and television personality (died 1978)
