= WJDX-FM =

Coordinates: 32.690°N 89.868°W

- Kosciusko, Mississippi; United States
- Broadcast area: Jackson, Mississippi
- Frequency: 105.1 MHz
- Branding: Real 105.1

Programming
- Language: English
- Format: Mainstream urban
- Affiliations: Premiere Networks

Ownership
- Owner: iHeartMedia, Inc.; (iHM Licenses, LLC)
- Sister stations: WJDX; WSTZ-FM; WMSI-FM; WHLH; WSFZ

History
- First air date: June 25, 1965 (as WKOZ-FM)
- Former call signs: WKOZ-FM (1965–1984); WBKJ (1984–1998); WQJQ (1998–2011)

Technical information
- Licensing authority: FCC
- Facility ID: 6482
- Class: C1
- ERP: 100,000 watts
- HAAT: 299 meters (981 ft)

Links
- Public license information: Public file; LMS
- Webcast: Listen live (via iHeartRadio)
- Website: real1051.iheart.com

WJDX-FM (105.1 MHz) is a mainstream urban radio station licensed to Kosciusko, Mississippi, but located in Jackson, Mississippi. It is owned by iHeartMedia. Its studios are located in northwest Jackson, and its transmitter site is east of Canton.

== History ==
From October 1998 to March 2003 WQJQ was a Jammin' Oldies station.

On January 24, 2011, WQJQ relaunched as "Oldies 105.1" and in the process changed its call sign to WJDX-FM. The original WJDX-FM was a progressive rock station at 102.9 (now WMSI-FM) from the late 1960s through the early 1970s. The station changed its calls to WZZQ in 1973 and would evolve from progressive rock to a locally produced AOR music format. WJDX-FM's oldies format included some of the songs that were popular on WJDX (AM) when that station played Top 40 music during the 1970s.

In November 2013, WJDX-FM flipped to its usual Christmas music format for the holidays. However, it changed its name to "FM 105.1: The Christmas Station". On December 26, 2013, WJDX-FM rebranded as "105.1 The River" and became a classic hits station (playing the hits of the 1960s, 1970s and 1980s). On September 1, 2014, the station ditched 1960s music to fully concentrate on 1970s and especially 1980s music. On February 11, 2019, the station made the switch from classic hits to adult hits (but still heavily concentrated on 1980s music).

On May 22, 2020, at noon, after stunting with music from different genres, WJDX-FM flipped to mainstream urban, branding itself as "Real 105.1". Before that, it had faked a flip to contemporary hit radio as "105.1 KISS FM", which lasted for 15 minutes.
