= WZRX (AM) =

Radio station in Jackson, Mississippi

Coordinates: 32°22′01″N 90°13′26″W

- Jackson, Mississippi; United States
- Branding: Fox Sports 1590

Programming
- Format: Defunct (formerly Sports)
- Affiliations: Fox Sports Radio

Ownership
- Owner: Clear Channel Communications; (Capstar TX LLC)

Technical information
- Facility ID: 37169
- Class: B
- Power: 5,000 watts (day); 1,000 watts (night)

WZRX (1590 AM, "Fox Sports 1590") was a sports radio station in Jackson, Mississippi. WZRX aired programming from Fox Sports Radio.

Throughout the 1960s and 1970s, the station was called "W1" (WWUN). It was a Top 40 rock-and-roll station, but it was not as popular as WRBC-AM. The station changed formats to the big-band sound in 1985, later changing the call letters to WYHT-AM (Your Hit Tunes). The hours were expanded to 24 hours a day. John Friskello was the major local announcer. It remained with that format until it changed again in the 1980s. Later, the call letters were changed to WZRX. For a while, it was a blues station, but in 2005 the format turned to all black gospel music as "Glory 1590". The format changed again in 2006 to an all-news, CNN Headline News affiliate.

The station also broadcast talk shows hosted by Glenn Beck and Lou Dobbs.

The CNN Headline News talk and discussion programs hosted by Nancy Grace and Jane Velez-Mitchell plus Showbiz News were also broadcast each evening.

On October 3, 2011, WZRX changed their format to sports, with programming from Fox Sports Radio.

The station went silent on January 1, 2012. On July 31, 2012, WZRX's license was cancelled by the Federal Communications Commission (FCC) and the WZRX call sign was deleted from the FCC's database.
