= WOAD (AM) =

Radio station in Jackson, Mississippi

Jackson, Mississippi; United States
- Broadcast area: Jackson, Mississippi
- Frequency: 1300 kHz
- Branding: Gospel 1300 AM & 103.5 FM

Programming
- Format: Urban gospel

Ownership
- Owner: Connoisseur Media; (Alpha Media Licensee LLC)
- Sister stations: WJMI; WJNT; WKXI-FM; WRKS; WJQS

History
- First air date: 1947
- Former call signs: WRBC (1947–1978); WKXI (1978–1996)
- Call sign meaning: "Working On A Dream"

Technical information
- Licensing authority: FCC
- Facility ID: 50404
- Class: B
- Power: 5,000 watts day; 1,000 watts night
- Translator(s): 103.5 W278BW (Jackson)

Links
- Public license information: Public file; LMS
- Webcast: Listen live
- Website: www.woad.com

WOAD (1300 kHz) is an AM radio station licensed to Jackson, Mississippi, with an urban gospel format. WOAD is owned by Connoisseur Media through licensee Alpha Media Licensee LLC. Along with five other sister stations, its studios are located in Ridgeland, a suburb of Jackson, while the transmitter tower is in the northside of Jackson.

== History ==
The 1300 kHz frequency was assigned the WRBC call letters for several years. Around 1978, the transmitter site was rebuilt and call letters were changed to WKXI.

In March 1996, the WOAD call letters and gospel format moved to the more powerful 1300 kHz, after swapping frequencies with then-sister station WKXI.

On January 11, 2004, WOAD started simulcasting on WOAD-FM 105.9. On July 2, 2009, WOAD dropped its FM simulcast and resumed AM-only broadcasting.

== Translator ==
Call sign	Frequency	City of license	FID	ERP (W)	Class	Transmitter coordinates	FCC info
W278BW	103.5 FM	Jackson, Mississippi	155142	250	D	32°16′51.5″N 90°17′38.3″W	LMS
