= Ridgeland, Mississippi =

- City
- Downtown Ridgeland

- Flag

- Location in Madison County and the state of Mississippi

- Location within Mississippi Location within the United States
- Coordinates: 32°25′12″N 90°7′30″W
- Country: United States
- State: Mississippi
- County: Madison

Government
  - Mayor: Gene F. McGee (R)

Area
  - Total: 28.06 sq mi (72.7 km^{2})
  - Land: 26.26 sq mi (68.0 km^{2})
  - Water: 1.80 sq mi (4.7 km^{2})
- Elevation: 354 ft (108 m)

Population (2020)
  - Total: 24,340
  - Density: 926.9/sq mi (357.9/km^{2})
- Time zone: UTC−6 (CST)
  - Summer (DST): UTC−5 (CDT)
- ZIP codes: 39157, 39158 (Ridgeland); 39110 (Madison)
- Area code: 601
- FIPS code: 28-62520
- GNIS feature ID: 2404616
- Website: www.ridgelandms.org

Ridgeland is a city in Madison County, Mississippi, United States. The population was 24,340 at the 2020 census. It is part of the Jackson metropolitan area.

== History ==
In 1805, the Choctaw Indian Agency, headed by Silas Dinsmoor, was located in what is now Ridgeland. The structure was then called "Turner Brashear's Stand" until about 1850. It was adapted for use as a hotel named the King's Inn. During the American Civil War, General Stephen Lee used the inn as a headquarters. The hotel continued to operate until 1896, when it was destroyed by fire.

In 1853, James B. Yellowley founded the community of Yellowley's Crossing (later named "Jessamine" after his wife). In 1896, Edward Treakle and Gordon Nichols, two real estate developers from Chicago, purchased the land from Yellowley and established the Highland Colony Company. They created plans for a town to be named "Ridgeland" and launched an advertising campaign to entice people from the northern United States to move south. Agriculture was the community's dominant revenue source, with pears and strawberries as the leading crops grown for sale.

In the early 20th century, Ridgeland was home to a hotel, sawmill, and a canning company. The main business section of Ridgeland was along Jackson Street, due to the Illinois Central Railroad located on the street. In 1910 a two-room school was created, and the schools combined with those of Madison by 1925. Rapid growth in the city's population began in the 1960s.

Northpark Mall opened in 1984 and brought more growth to the area. Highland Colony Parkway was built in the 1990s.

== Geography ==
Ridgeland is a suburban city in southern Madison County, between Madison to the north and Jackson, the state capital, to the south. The Ross Barnett Reservoir borders the city to the east.

According to the U.S. Census Bureau, Ridgeland has a total area of 28.1 square miles (73 km^{2}), of which 26.3 square miles (68 km^{2}) are land and 1.8 square miles (4.7 km^{2}), or 6.41%, are water, mostly from Ross Barnett Reservoir, an impoundment on the Pearl River. Most of the city drains southward to the Pearl River in Jackson, while the northwest corner of the city is part of the Big Black River watershed flowing west to the Mississippi.

== Demographics ==
Historical population
Census	Pop.	Note	%±
1910	158		—
1920	164		3.8%
1930	217		32.3%
1940	233		7.4%
1950	526		125.8%
1960	875		66.3%
1970	1,650		88.6%
1980	5,461		231.0%
1990	11,714		114.5%
2000	20,173		72.2%
2010	24,047		19.2%
2020	24,340		1.2%
U.S. Decennial Census; 2018 Estimate

=== 2020 census ===
As of the 2020 census, there were 24,340 people and 6,046 families residing in the city. The median age was 38.5 years. 20.4% of residents were under the age of 18 and 17.8% of residents were 65 years of age or older. For every 100 females there were 84.2 males, and for every 100 females age 18 and over there were 79.1 males age 18 and over.

96.1% of residents lived in urban areas, while 3.9% lived in rural areas.

There were 10,751 households in Ridgeland, of which 26.9% had children under the age of 18 living in them. Of all households, 35.9% were married-couple households, 20.7% were households with a male householder and no spouse or partner present, and 38.0% were households with a female householder and no spouse or partner present. About 38.0% of all households were made up of individuals and 11.4% had someone living alone who was 65 years of age or older.

There were 12,420 housing units, of which 13.4% were vacant. The homeowner vacancy rate was 1.5% and the rental vacancy rate was 19.3%.

Racial composition as of the 2020 census
Race	Number	Percent
White	11,410	46.9%
Black or African American	9,622	39.5%
American Indian and Alaska Native	83	0.3%
Asian	1,033	4.2%
Native Hawaiian and Other Pacific Islander	6	0.0%
Some other race	1,161	4.8%
Two or more races	1,025	4.2%
Hispanic or Latino (of any race)	1,646	6.8%

=== 2010 census ===
As of the 2010 United States census, there were 24,047 people living in the city. The racial makeup of the city was 57.5% White, 32.5% Black, 0.2% Native American, 4.0% Asian, <0.1% Pacific Islander, 0.1% from some other race and 1.0% from two or more races. 4.7% were Hispanic or Latino of any race.

=== 2000 census ===
As of the census of 2000, there were 20,173 people, 9,267 households, and 9,022 families living in the city. The population density was 1,267.4 inhabitants per square mile (489.3/km^{2}). There were 9,930 housing units at an average density of 623.9 per square mile (240.9/km^{2}). The racial makeup of the city was 77.05% White, 18.44% African American, 0.15% Native American, 2.95% Asian, 0.04% Pacific Islander, 0.55% from other races, and 0.82% from two or more races. Hispanic or Latino of any race were 1.55% of the population.

There were 9,267 households, out of which 28.8% had children under the age of 18 living with them, 40.7% were married couples living together, 10.4% had a female householder with no husband present, and 45.8% were non-families. 38.6% of all households were made up of individuals, and 6.5% had someone living alone who was 65 years of age or older. The average household size was 2.15 and the average family size was 2.90.

In the city, the population was spread out, with 23.4% under the age of 18, 10.2% from 18 to 24, 40.3% from 25 to 44, 17.8% from 45 to 64, and 8.2% who were 65 years of age or older. The median age was 32 years. For every 100 females, there were 89.9 males. For every 100 females age 18 and over, there were 86.7 males.

The median incomes for a household in the city was $43,066, and the median income for a family was $59,249. Males had a median income of $40,632 versus $29,634 for females. The per capita income for the city was $28,704. About 5.5% of families and 7.4% of the population were below the poverty line, including 9.2% of those under age 18 and 5.6% of those age 65 or over.

== Economy ==
Bomgar, a tech company, C Spire Wireless, the sixth largest wireless provider in the United States, and Cal-Maine Foods, the largest shell egg producer in the United States, are all headquartered in Ridgeland.

The largest mall in the Jackson metro area, Northpark Mall, is located on County Line Road in southern Ridgeland. Another shopping center, Renaissance at Colony Park, is in central Ridgeland.

== Education ==
Ridgeland is served by the Madison County School District, as well as by two private schools: Saint Andrew's Episcopal School and Christ Covenant School. The Veritas School was a private school which closed in 2015.

Ridgeland has a campus of Holmes Community College. It also has a campus of Delta Technical College.

Ridgeland is home of the Baptist Children's Village, which provides short-term and long-term care for abandoned, neglected, or abused children and counseling to broken families.

Ridgeland made national headlines in 2022 when mayor Gene F. McGee refused to send $110,000 in approved city funding to the Madison County Library System because the library system contained books that "went against his Christian beliefs".

== Buildings and structures ==
- 57.9 metres tall cellphone tower in shape of the Washington Monument at 32°26′50″N 90°08′47″W.

== Notable people ==
- The Band Perry
- Faith Hill, country music singer; born and raised in Ridgeland until moving to nearby Star when she was in the 8th grade
- George Jackson, songwriter and singer; died at his home in Ridgeland
- Bianca Knight, track and field athlete
- David McRae, Mississippi State Treasurer
- J. Walter Michel, member of the Mississippi State Senate
- David H. Nutt, lawyer and philanthropist, the richest person in Mississippi as of 2014
- Jim Pace, racing driver
- Rubel Phillips, Republican gubernatorial nominee in 1963 and 1967; spent his last years in retirement in Ridgeland
