= Pirate radio in North America =

Unlicensed radio stations in North America

The strict definition of a pirate radio station is a station that operates from sovereign territory without a broadcasting license, or just beyond the territorial waters of a sovereign nation from on board a ship or other marine structure with the intention of broadcasting to that nation without obtaining a broadcasting license from that nation (such as Radio Caroline in the U.K. before its present incarnation).

== Cuba ==
=== Pirate radio by Cuban exiles ===
Unlike the sanctioned and fully licensed transmissions by the United States government, a number of groups in exile, mainly based in Florida, have attempted various offshore radio broadcasts to Cuba, from time to time. These stations are mainly short lived and sporadic in transmission times, but because their broadcasts are not licensed by any nation, their signals are considered to be from pirate radio stations and the USA has taken various physical and legal steps to close them down at different times.

== Mexico ==
=== Pirate radio in Mexico ===
There are a number of pirate radio stations in Mexico. Radio Insurgente, the voice of the Zapatista movement, operated from 2003 to 2009. The station was unlicensed, but according to the San Andres Accords, the indigenous communities targeted by Radio Insurgente had the right to broadcast their own content. The most recent example of a true pirate radio station in Mexico is La Tremenda 106.5 in Nuevo Laredo, Tamaulipas. It broadcast international contemporary music and news in Spanish and English. It used the fictitious U.S. call sign "KLPR" on its logo. The station began operations in May 2006, was shut down in June 2008 by the federal police in a "violent" take over. It was suspected that the signal was also used for transmitting messages of members of organized crime. Today, there are several other pirate stations in Nuevo Laredo as well.

The border-blaster or other border stations in Mexico do not meet either above definitions of pirate radio station, however may be considered as such by some governments.

=== Border blasters ===
From the earliest days of the history of broadcasting, a number of radio stations licensed in Mexico, became known to the general public as border-blasters. This was due to their excessive use of power which was necessary to reach their intended audience in American cities far north of the border. The traditional border-blasters were AM radio stations; though there are numerous FM radio and even television stations along the border that broadcast to the U.S. from Mexico, the power of FM stations along the border is limited by a U.S.-Mexican agreement.

However, because these stations are licensed by the government of Mexico, they can only be classified as pirate radio stations in the same way that the British government classified Radio Luxembourg as a pirate radio station. Radio Luxembourg was a licensed station broadcasting with a power and on a frequency that the British authorities objected to, because the intended audience for its programs were located within the United Kingdom. The objection by the government of the United Kingdom to commercial broadcasts from Luxembourg, France and other countries, was primarily based upon its protection of the non-commercial BBC Radio monopoly. Also, the UK at the time required a license for radios, which was limited to UK stations; it still requires a license for television sets. However, the U.S. has never required a license to listen to broadcast radio or TV; today, it even issues routine licenses under the Brinkley Act, originally enacted to silence the border-blaster charlatan John R. Brinkley, for the operation of Mexican stations from studio facilities in the U.S.

== United States ==
=== Land-based unlicensed broadcasts ===
In the United States, the term pirate radio implies the unlicensed broadcasting use of any part of the radio spectrum that is reserved for use by governmental, public or commercial licensees by the Federal Communications Commission. This includes the FM, AM and shortwave radio bands.

Compared to authoritarian systems of government which restrict access to the means of communication, the airwaves of the USA are relatively free from direct government censorship. As a result of this difference, the term pirate radio has a different interpretation than in countries where access to communication is limited.

In the United States, pirate radio is frequently, but not always, associated with anarchism, which considers governmental spectrum regulatory schemes as favoring the interests of large corporations, due to reasons such as high licensing costs. Therefore, some anarchists consider pirate radio transmissions to be a challenge to that authority.

Pirate radio is also in large part the resulting backlash from Federal Communications Commission's Title 47 CFR Part 15, which prohibits certain power broadcasting. NPR and the NAB convinced the FCC to eliminate the class D license in 1979. This kept all new low-power stations from getting a license, and bumped all of the old ones down to secondary status, forcing many more off the air since then. Despite this, an explosion of broadcast translators on FM, technically identical but rebroadcasting other stations, most part of religious broadcasting networks, has occurred since then. This further fueled pirate operators in the 1980s and 1990s.

In 1982, an organization of pirate radio monitoring enthusiasts was formed by Darren Leno. Known as the Association of Clandestine Radio Enthusiasts (ACE) the organization was and remains a very popular conduit for sharing information about North American pirate radio and other unusual radio transmissions.

Because of this severe lack of access, numerous pirate radio operators (such as Stephen Dunifer), as well as other groups petitioned the FCC for a new LPFM service. After many years of trying, this finally was passed around 2000, although it blocked former pirate operators from holding licenses. Lobbied by the commercial radio industry, the U.S. Congress intervened and limited the new service even further, though technical tests later proved this to be baseless, and the added restrictions were lifted.

Although this should mean that pirate radio has seen a decrease, most of the licensees are churches, colleges, and state or local government transportation departments, as the FCC requires the licensee to be a non-profit organization. Pirate radio also continues because legal open spots on the FM dial have been filled in since and because of the 1979 ruling, by both full-power and translator stations.

Part 15 of the FCC rules allows the use of spectrum without a license but emissions pursuant to this rule are not practical for broadcasting due to extremely restrictive power levels which limit range (range varies depending on frequency spectrum). Part 15 is intended to allow for operation of a broad range of electrical devices that emit radio energy either as an intended element of their operation (e.g. garage door openers, FM modulators for iPod auto use) or as a by-product of their operation. Despite the limited range possible under Part 15, some small broadcast stations are operated within its parameters, while others operate claiming to be Part 15 compliant but with signals exceeding what is permitted under the rule.

Because basic radio transmission equipment is relatively easy to obtain in the US and because it is relatively easy to hide, the Federal Communications Commission (FCC), which has the authority to regulate radio communications, sometimes has difficulty in finding and prosecuting offenders who transmit without a license. Triangulation may be used, but most frequently a spectrum analyzer is driven around the affected area, with a person monitoring where the suspect signal is highest, and another one looking for any obvious signs such as an antenna or small tower (like that used for amateur radio).

The FCC maintains a database of alleged pirate radio broadcasters in the United States on a state-by-state basis which is made available to Congress as a report.

== Stations from international waters ==
- 1933

RXKR, aboard the SS City of Panama anchored off California, USA.

- 1973

Radio Free America, a short-lived religious station by Dr. Carl McIntire aboard the MV Columbus anchored off New Jersey, USA.

- 1987 & 1988

Radio Newyork International, from a ship anchored off Jones Beach, Long Island, New York, USA.

== See also ==
- Community radio
- Low-power broadcasting
- Pirate television
- KDIC (FM) § Railroad track antenna legend
