= Wolfman Jack =

American DJ and music TV host (1938–1995)

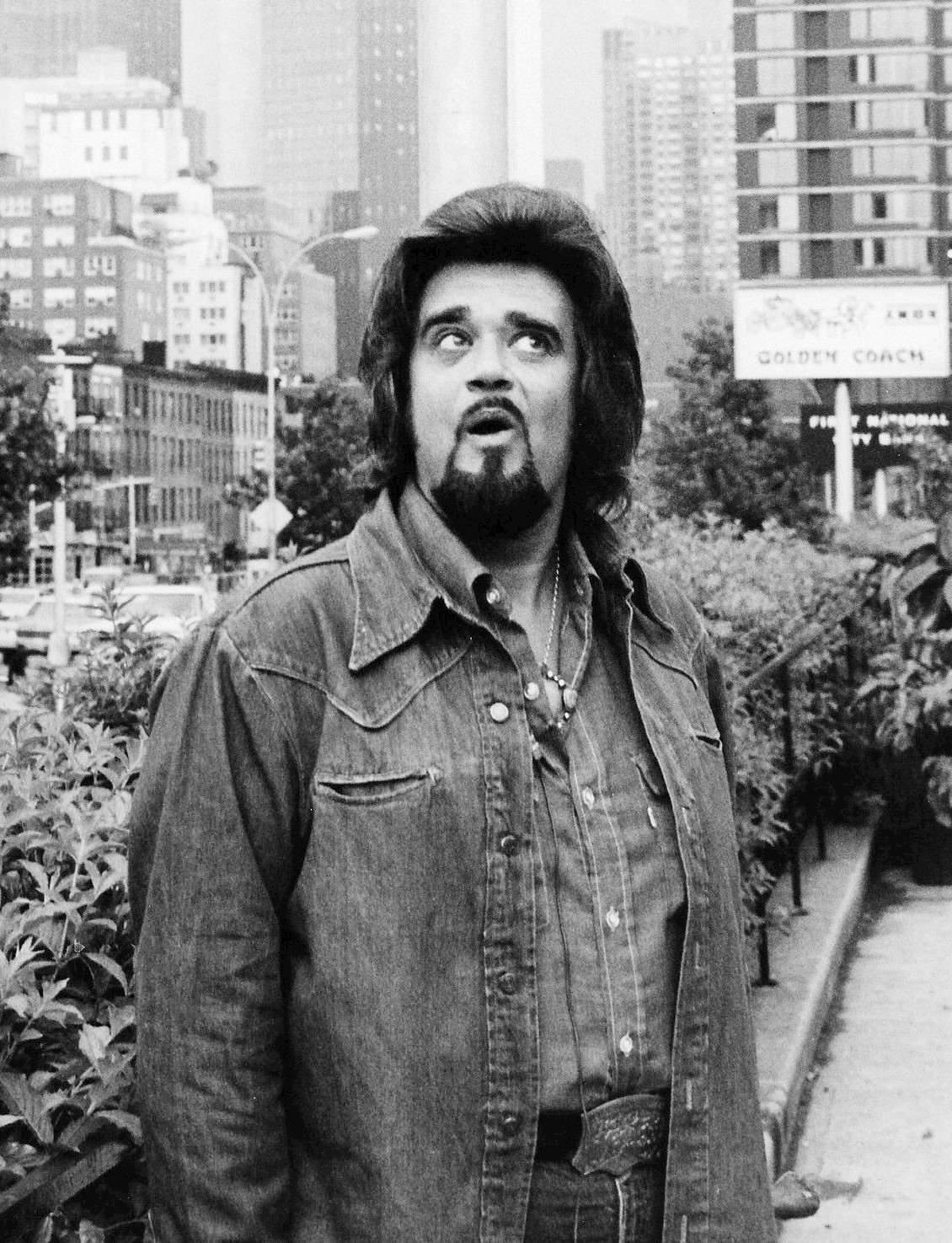
- Jack in 1974
- Born: Robert Weston Smith; January 21, 1938; Brooklyn, New York City, U.S.
- Died: July 1, 1995 (aged 57); Belvidere, North Carolina, U.S.
- Occupations: Disc jockey; radio personality; musician; television presenter
- Years active: 1960–1995
- Spouse: Lucy "Lou" Lamb
- Children: 2
- Awards: National Radio Hall of Fame

Robert Weston Smith (January 21, 1938 – July 1, 1995), known as Wolfman Jack, was an American disc jockey active for over three decades. He was famous for his gravelly voice, and credited it with his success, saying, "It's kept meat and potatoes on the table for years for Wolfman and Wolfwoman. A couple of shots of whiskey helps it. I've got that nice raspy sound."

== Early life ==
Smith was born in Brooklyn, New York City, on January 21, 1938, the younger of two children of Anson Weston Smith, an Episcopal Sunday school teacher, writer, editor, and executive vice president of Financial World, and his wife, Rosamond Small. He lived on 12th Street and 4th Avenue and went to Manual Training High School in the Park Slope section. His parents divorced while he was a child. To help keep him out of trouble, his father bought him a large Trans-Oceanic radio, and Smith became a fan of R&B music and the disc jockeys who played it, including Douglas "Jocko" Henderson of Philadelphia; New York's "Dr. Jive", Tommy Smalls; the "Moon Dog" from Cleveland, Alan Freed; and Nashville's "John R." Richbourg, who later became his mentor. After selling encyclopedias and Fuller brushes door-to-door, Smith attended the National Academy of Broadcasting (NAB) in Washington, D.C.

== Broadcasting career ==
After graduating from NAB in 1960, Smith began working as "Daddy Jules" at WYOU in Newport News, Virginia. When the station format changed to "beautiful music", he became known as "Roger Gordon and Music in Good Taste". In 1962, Smith moved to country music station KCIJ/1050 in Shreveport, Louisiana, as the station manager and morning disc jockey, "Big Smith with the Records". He married Lucy "Lou" Lamb in 1961, and they had two children.

Cleveland's Alan Freed had originally called himself the "Moon Dog" after New York City street musician Moondog. Freed both adopted this name and used a recorded howl to give his early broadcasts a unique character. Smith's adaptation of the Moondog theme was to call himself Wolfman Jack and add his own sound effects. The character was based in part on the manner and style of bluesman Howlin' Wolf. At KCIJ, he first began to develop his famous alter ego, Wolfman Jack. According to author Philip A. Lieberman, Smith's "Wolfman" persona "derived from Smith's love of horror films and his shenanigans as a 'wolfman' with his two young nephews. The 'Jack' nickname was taken from the 'hipster' lingo of the 1950s, as in 'Take a page from my book, Jack', or the more popular, 'Hit the road, Jack.'"

In 1963, Smith took his act to the border when Inter-American Radio Advertising's Ramon Bosquez hired him and sent him to the studio and transmitter site of XERF-AM at Ciudad Acuña in Mexico, a station across the U.S.-Mexico border from Del Rio, Texas, whose high-powered border blaster signal could be picked up across much of the United States. In an interview with writer Tom Miller, Smith described the reach of the XERF signal: "We had the most powerful signal in North America. Birds dropped dead when they flew too close to the tower. A car driving from New York to L.A. would never lose the station."

Many of the Mexican border stations broadcast at 150,000 watts, three times the U.S. limit, meaning that their signals were picked up all over North America, and at night as far away as Europe and the Soviet Union. At XERF, Smith developed his signature style (with phrases such as, "Who's this on the Wolfman telephone?") and widespread fame. The border stations made money by renting time to Pentecostal preachers and psychics, and by taking 50% of the profit from anything sold by mail order. The Wolfman did pitches for dog food, weight-loss pills, weight-gain pills, rose bushes, and baby chicks. Even a pill called Florex, which was supposed to enhance one's sex drive, was sold. "Some zing for your ling nuts", the Wolfman would say.

XERB was the original call sign for the border blaster station in Rosarito Beach, Mexico, which was branded as The Mighty 1090 in Hollywood, California. The station boasted "50,000 watts of Boss Soul Power". That station continues to broadcast under the call sign XEPRS-AM. XERB also had an office in the rear of a small strip mall on Third Avenue in Chula Vista, California just 10 minutes from the Tijuana–San Diego border crossing. The Wolfman was rumored to actually broadcast from this location during the early to mid-1960s. Smith left Mexico after eight months and moved to Minneapolis to run station KUXL. Although Smith was managing a Minneapolis radio station, he was still broadcasting as Wolfman Jack on XERF via taped shows that he sent to the station.

Missing the excitement, however, Wolfman returned to border radio to run XERB, and opened an office on Sunset Boulevard in Los Angeles in January 1966. He recorded his shows in Los Angeles and shipped his tapes across the border into Mexico, where they would then be transmitted across the U.S.

In 1971, the Mexican government, under pressure from the Roman Catholic church, banned the Pentecostal preachers from the radio, taking away 80% of XERB's revenue. Smith then moved to station KDAY 1580 in Los Angeles, which could only pay him a fraction of his former XERB income. Smith capitalized on his fame, though, by editing his old XERB tapes and selling them to radio stations everywhere, becoming one of the first rock-and-roll syndicated programs (as the tapes began to age, they were eventually marketed to oldies stations). He also appeared on Armed Forces Radio from 1970 to 1986. At his peak, Wolfman Jack was heard on more than 2,000 radio stations in 53 countries. He was heard as far afield as the Wild Coast, Transkei, on Capital Radio 604 based there.

In a deal promoted by Don Kelley, the Wolfman was paid handsomely to join WNBC in New York in August 1973, the same month that American Graffiti premiered, and the station did a huge advertising campaign in local newspapers predicting the Wolfman would propel their ratings over those of their main competitor, WABC's Cousin Brucie (Bruce Morrow). The advertisements proclaimed, "Cousin Brucie's Days Are Numbered / Wolfman Jack Is on the Prowl", and thousands of small, tombstone-shaped paperweights were distributed that said, "Cousin Brucie is going to be buried by Wolfman Jack".

After less than a year, WNBC hired Cousin Brucie, and Wolfman Jack went back to California to concentrate on his syndicated radio show, which was carried on KRLA-Pasadena (Los Angeles) from 1984 to 1987. He moved to Belvidere, North Carolina, in 1989, to be closer to his extended family. In the 1980s, he did a brief stint at XEROK 80, another border-blaster station that was leased by Dallas investors Robert Hanna, Grady Sanders, and John Ryman. He also hosted a TV show at Little Darlin's Rock n' Roll Palace, which was eventually renamed Wolfman Jack's Rock'n'Roll Palace. Ryman then moved Smith to Scott Ginsburg-owned Y95 in Dallas, Texas.

Recordings of Wolfman Jack's old shows were reintroduced to syndication a decade after his death and remain available to local stations, through Talent Farm as of mid-2020. In 2024, as part of an oldies format marking its 85th anniversary, XEPRS began to carry the remastered recordings.

== Film, television, and music career ==
In his early days, Wolfman Jack made sporadic public appearances, usually as a master of ceremonies for rock bands at Los Angeles clubs. At each appearance, he looked a little different because he had not decided what the Wolfman should look like. Early pictures show him with a goatee, but sometimes he combed his straight hair forward and added dark makeup to look somewhat "ethnic." Other times he had a big afro wig and large sunglasses. The ambiguity of his race contributed to the controversy of his program. His audience finally got a good look at him when he appeared in the 1969 film A Session with the Committee, a montage of skits by the comedy troupe The Committee.

Wolfman Jack started his recording career in Minneapolis while working at KUXL Radio in 1965 with George Garrett, who helped record the album Boogie with the Wolfman by Wolfman Jack and the Wolfpack on the Bread Label. He was also responsible for engineering, producing, and assembling the band. Wolfman Jack also released Wolfman Jack (1972) and Through the Ages (1973) on the Wooden Nickel label.

In 1973, Wolfman Jack appeared as himself in George Lucas's second feature film, American Graffiti. Lucas gave him a fraction of a "point", the division of the profits from a film, and the extreme financial success of American Graffiti provided him with a regular income for life. He also appeared in the film's 1979 sequel More American Graffiti, though only through voice-overs. In 1978, he appeared as Bob "The Jackal" Smith in a made-for-TV movie Deadman's Curve based on the musical careers of Jan Berry and Dean Torrence of Jan and Dean. Smith appeared in several television shows as Wolfman Jack, including The Odd Couple, What's Happening!!, Vega$, Hollywood Squares, Married... with Children (his final public performance), Emergency!, The New Adventures of Wonder Woman, and Galactica 1980. He was the regular announcer and occasional host for The Midnight Special on NBC from 1973 to 1981. He was the host of his variety series The Wolfman Jack Show, which was produced in Canada by CBC Television in 1976 and syndicated to stations in the U.S. In 1984, Wolfman Jack starred as himself on the short-lived ABC animated series Wolf Rock TV. He also voiced the chief of the Rama Lama tribe on the TV special Garfield in Paradise in 1986.

Wolfman Jack's characteristic voice is imitated by disc jockey Ken Griffin on Sugarloaf's 1974 hit single "Don't Call Us, We'll Call You" and he is mentioned on the Grateful Dead song "Ramble On Rose". He furnished his voice in The Guess Who's top-10 hit single "Clap for the Wolfman". In 1976, he furnished his voice on "Did You Boogie (With Your Baby)" by Flash Cadillac & the Continental Kids. Wolfman Jack was regularly parodied on The Hilarious House of Frightenstein as "The Wolfman," an actual werewolf disc jockey with a look inspired by the original The Wolf Man movies. A few years earlier, Todd Rundgren recorded the tribute "Wolfman Jack" on the album Something/Anything?; the single version of the track includes a shouted talk-over introduction by the Wolfman, but on the album version, Rundgren performs that part himself. Canadian band The Stampeders also released a cover of "Hit the Road Jack" in 1975 featuring Wolfman Jack. From 1975 to 1980, Wolfman Jack hosted Halloween Haunt at Knott's Berry Farm, which transforms itself into Knott's Scary Farm each year for Halloween. It was the most successful special event of any theme park in the country, and often sold out.

In 2012, the estate of Wolfman Jack released a hip-hop single featuring Wolfman Jack clips as the vocals. In 2016, clips from the Wolfman Jack Radio Program were used in the Rob Zombie film 31.

== Radio Caroline ==
When the one surviving ship in what had originally been a pirate radio network of Radio Caroline North and Radio Caroline South sank in 1980, a search began to find a replacement. Because of new laws passed in the UK in 1967 (Marine, &c., Broadcasting (Offences) Act 1967), the sales operation needed to be situated outside of the UK. For a time, Don Kelley, Wolfman Jack's business partner and personal manager, acted as the West Coast agent for the planned new Radio Caroline, but the deal eventually fell apart.

As a part of this process, Wolfman Jack was set to deliver the morning shows on the new station. To that end, he recorded a number of programs that never aired, because the station did not come on air according to schedule. (It eventually returned in 1983 from a new ship, which remained at sea until 1990.) Today, those tapes are traded among collectors of his work.

== Death ==
On July 1, 1995, Smith died from a heart attack at his house in Belvidere, North Carolina, shortly after finishing a weekly broadcast. He was 57 years old. He is buried at a family cemetery in Belvidere.

== Trivia ==
- Wolfman Jack is portrayed by Jack Black in the 2022 satirical biopic Weird: The Al Yankovic Story. He is portrayed as a rival of Dr. Demento (played in the film by Rainn Wilson).
- From 1978 to 1980, an animatronic band called the Wolf Pack 5 appeared twice at the IAAPA and at the first ShowBiz Pizza in Kansas City, Missouri. The leader of the band was an anthropomorphic wolf who was modeled after Jack. He was originally voice by Joe Montione, while Aaron Fechter provided the voice for Showbiz Pizza Place in 1980.
- In the 1991 album Oblivion by British hard rock band D-ROK, Wolfman Jack is mentioned multiple times on the track "King Hibited".
- On Diamond D's 1992 album Stunts, Blunts and Hip Hop, a parody of Wolfman Jack is done on the skit "Wuffman Stressed Out".
- Wolfman Jack's voice was used in the 1989 beat 'em up arcade video game DJ Boy as the announcer Demon Kogure in the American version.
- Wolfman Jack is sampled on J-Dilla's 2006 album, Donuts, on the track "Anti-American Graffiti". The sample comes from the 1973 album, How Time Flys by David Ossman.
- In his 2020 song "Murder Most Foul", Bob Dylan invokes Wolfman Jack many times.
- Wolfman Jack appeared at the Modesto American Graffiti Festival several times, for the first time in 1988. The film American Graffiti, which portrays Wolfman Jack, takes place in Modesto, California.
- "Clap for the Wolfman" is a song performed by band The Guess Who. The song appeared on their 1974 album, Road Food, and was ranked #84 on Billboard magazine's Top Hot 100 songs of 1974. Wolfman Jack appears on the recording. The song was created as a direct tribute to Wolfman Jack.

== Filmography ==
Year	Title	Role	Notes
1971	The Seven Minutes	Himself	
1973	American Graffiti	Disc Jockey / Himself	
1973	The Odd Couple	Himself	"The Songwriter"
1975	Emergency!	Disc Jockey	"The Inspection"
1978	Sgt. Pepper's Lonely Hearts Club Band	Our Guests At Heartland	
1978	Hanging on a Star	Gordon Shep	
1978	Deadman's Curve	Bob "The Jackal" Smith	
1978	The New Adventures of Wonder Woman	Infra Red	"Disco Devil"
1978	What's Happening!!	Himself	"Going, Going, Gong"
1979	More American Graffiti	Himself	
1980	Motel Hell	Reverend Billy	
1980	The Fonz and the Happy Days Gang	Narrator	Animated
1980	Galactica 1980	Himself	"The Night the Cylons Landed"
1984	Wolf Rock TV	Himself	
1985	The Midnight Hour	Radio DJ	Made-for-television movie
1986	Garfield in Paradise	Rama Lama Tribe Chief (voice)	Animated TV special
1988	Mortuary Academy	Bernie Berkowitz	
1989	Midnight	Himself	
1992	Swamp Thing	Hurly	"Children of the Fool"
1995	Married... with Children	Himself	"Ship Happens: Part 1" (Final appearance)
