= Goat gland =

Goat gland transplantation was a quack surgical treatment promoted by John R. Brinkley in the 1920s.

Goat gland may also refer to:

- Goat gland (filmmaking), a term applied c. 1927–1929, during the period of transition from silent to sound films and referred to an already completed silent film to which one or more talkie sequences were added; the name was derived by analogy to Brinkley's goat gland treatment
