= XERA (Villa Acuña) =

Radio station in Villa Acuña, Coahuila, Mexico, 1935–1939

XERA was a Mexican "border blaster" radio station in Villa Acuña, Coahuila. Located at the Mexican-U.S. border, most of its audience was in the United States.

== History ==
From 1935 to 1939, XERA was the call sign of a border blaster radio station licensed to Ramón D. Bósquez Vitela in September 1935 to Compañía Mexicana Radiodifusora Fronteriza in Villa Acuña, Coahuila. It was the successor to station XER which had been at the same location but whose transmitter had been dismantled after the station ceased broadcasting in February 1933. Like XER, it was under the control of notorious "goat gland doctor" John R. Brinkley of the U.S. state of Kansas. After losing control of XER when it was shut down by the Mexican government in 1933, Brinkley dismantled the original XER transmitter but attempted to get a new concession for Villa Acuña. Months later in September 1935 he was granted a new concession via his partnership of Cía Mexicana Radiodifusora Fronteriza, a company which was represented by Bósquez as the owner; this was officially awarded on November 18 of that year. The station broadcast on 960 kHz. Although the station was widely said to be under Brinkley's control, Brinkley claimed to merely be one of its advertisers, and sued claims to the contrary for libel.

Brinkley used the old buildings of XER but installed a new 500 kilowatt transmitter with help from two Texas radio engineers. The antenna for XER had been omnidirectional, but the new directional antenna of XERA allowed Brinkley to claim that his station had an effective radiated power of one megawatt. One of his Texas engineers called XERA "the world's most powerful broadcasting station," which was a slogan that he would use again in the 1960s for two more of his engineering endeavors: the United States military transmitters which communicated with the U.S. submarine fleet, and again for the offshore pirate station Swinging Radio England.

Following the signing of various international treaties with the United States, the Mexican government forced XERA off the air in the closing days of 1939, by which time it had moved to 800 kHz. The station's programming, featuring quack doctors, religious cures and Nazi propaganda, and the station's reputation for breaking laws and evading taxes, put the station in the sights of both Mexican and American authorities. XERA ceased transmissions in 1939.

On June 16, 1941, the Official Journal of the Federation ran a decree expropriating the station, also noting that "the Federal Government has an urgent need to obtain a radio station as powerful as XERA to dedicate it to the service of the Federation ... and that it is currently not possible to obtain it from the United States of America, given the conditions that dominate in Europe". Again the equipment was removed and the location would not become the site of another, unrelated border blaster until years later following World War II in 1947. See the history of XERF for details.
