= XER (Villa Acuña) =

Border-blaster radio station, shut down by Mexican authorities in 1933

- Villa Acuña, Coahuila; Mexico
- Broadcast area: North America
- Frequencies: 735 kHz; 840 kHz
- Branding: Sunshine Station between the Nations

Programming
- Language: English
- Format: Talk

Ownership
- Owner: Dr. John R. Brinkley

History
- First air date: August 18, 1932
- Last air date: February 24, 1933

Technical information
- Power: 75,000 watts

XER, licensed to Villa Acuña, Coahuila, Mexico, was John R. Brinkley's first high-powered "border-blaster" radio station. It first came on the air in 1932. It was shut down by the Mexican authorities in 1933 and the Villa Acuña Broadcasting Company was dissolved.

== History ==
XER called itself the "Sunshine Station between the Nations", and it broadcast on 735 kHz, on the AM band from Villa Acuña, Coahuila. The owner was Dr. John R. Brinkley of Kansas, who established a management company called Villa Acuña Broadcasting Company located just across the Rio Grande in Del Rio, Texas. It first signed on August 18, 1932, with a 50-kW transmitter and claimed 75 kW power output via an omnidirectional antenna. The engineering was by Will Branch of Fort Worth, who had engineered WBAP for Amon Carter, owner of the Fort Worth Star-Telegram. For a brief period, XER-AM was licensed for one million watts, but XER was shut down by the Mexican authorities on February 24, 1933, and the Villa Acuña Broadcasting Company of Del Rio, which had managed the station, was dissolved.

The XER call sign was assigned in 1943 to a new station in Linares, Nuevo León, which migrated to FM and is now XHR-FM.

== See also ==
- XERA - after XER closed down in 1933, XERA reoccupied the station's original facilities in September 1935.
- XERF - a later station which began broadcasting shortly after XERA was closed down
