= R. Alton Lee =

Roy Alton Lee (May 24, 1931 – December 7, 2024) was an American professor emeritus of history at the University of South Dakota, where he taught American history. After retiring in 1996, he moved to Kansas and authored works on Kansas history. He has written books on John Romulus Brinkley and other purveyors of pseudoscience. He was nominated for the sixth annual William Rockhill Nelson Award honoring literary excellence by Kansas and Missouri writers.

== Biography ==
He was born on May 24, 1931, and he married Marilyn Joyce Kurzava in Kansas City, Missouri. He was professor of history at the University of South Dakota and after retiring in 1996, he moved to Kansas and authored works on Kansas history.

Lee died on December 7, 2024, at the age of 93.

== Books authored ==
- When Sunflowers Bloomed Red: Kansas and the Rise of Socialism in America, with Steven Cox. University of Nebraska Press. 2020. ISBN 978-1496219824
- Publisher for the Masses, Emanuel Haldeman-Julius. University of Nebraska Press, 2017. ISBN 978-1496201287
- A New Deal for South Dakota: Drought, Depression, and Relief, 1920–1941. South Dakota Historical Society Press, 2016. ISBN 978-1941813119
- Sunflower Justice: A New History of the Kansas Supreme Court. University of Nebraska Press, 2014. ISBN 978-0803254107
- Principle Over Party: The Farmers' Alliance and Populism in South Dakota, 1880–1900. South Dakota Historical Society Press, 2011. ISBN 978-0979894091
- From Snake Oil to Medicine: Pioneering Public Health Praeger, 2007. ISBN 978-0275994679
- Farmers vs. Wage Earners: Organized Labor in Kansas, 1860–1960. University of Nebraska Press, 2005. ISBN 978-0803229648
- The Bizarre Careers of John R. Brinkley. University Press of Kentucky, 2002. ISBN 978-0813122328
- T-Town on the Plains. Sunflower University Press, 1999. ISBN 978-0897452359
- Harry S. Truman: Where Did the Buck Stop?. Peter Lang, 1991. ISBN 978-0820414225
- Eisenhower and Landrum-Griffin: A Study in Labor-Management Politics. University Press of Kentucky, 1990. ISBN 978-0813193755
- Dwight D. Eisenhower: Soldier and Statesman. Nelson-Hall, 1981. ISBN 978-0882296265
- A History of Regulatory Taxation. University Press of Kentucky, 1973. ISBN 978-0813113036
- Truman and Taft-Hartley: A Question of Mandate. University of Kentucky Press, 1966. ISBN 978-0313226182
