= La Tremenda 106.5 =

Pirate radio station in Nuevo Laredo, Tamaulipas (2006–2008)

La Tremenda

Nuevo Laredo, Tamaulipas; Mexico
- Broadcast area: Nuevo Laredo, Tamaulipas; Laredo, Texas
- Frequency: 106.5 MHz
- Branding: La Tremenda

Programming
- Format: International contemporary

Ownership
- Owner: Javier Delgado

History
- First air date: May 2006
- Last air date: June 5, 2008

Technical information
- Class: pirate radio

Links
- Website: www.tremenda.com.mx

La Tremenda (branded as La Tremenda de los Dos Laredos) was an international contemporary music FM radio station that served the Nuevo Laredo, Tamaulipas and Laredo, Texas area of the Mexico – United States border. From May 2006 through June 2008, the radio station broadcast as a pirate FM radio station since it did not have a permit or license to broadcast. In June 2008, the station was shut down and a month later the station was back on air for a few days later, only to go silent again. Today, 106.5 FM occupied by another pirate radio station known as Radio Voz 106.5. This new pirate station is likely related, as it has the same logo.

== Callsign ==
This station never had a call sign due to it being a pirate radio station which broadcast without a license or permit. Its logo contained the fictitious United States "callsign type" letters "KLPR". It used the KLPR callsign and its slogan "La Tremenda de Los Dos Laredos" (English: La Tremenda of the Two Laredos) to make it harder for the American or Mexican government to investigate its broadcasting location since it was located on the United States-Mexican border.

A legally-licensed station in Kearney, Nebraska now uses the KLPR call sign.

== Shutdown ==
The station was shut down by the Mexican Federal Police with orders from the Attorney General on June 5, 2008 at 2:00 PM. The last sounds broadcast were banging on doors, shouting, and glass breaking. Newspaper sources stated that "it was suspected that the signal was used for transmitting messages from members of organized crime." The shutdown of La Tremenda was part of "Operation Tamaulipas", which was the operation of federal police and military to crack down on drug gangs in Tamaulipas. La Tremenda's broadcasting equipment, including the antenna, was dismantled and taken by the Mexican authorities. The owner faced two to 12 years in prison and a fine of up to US$40,000. The owner of the pirate radio station said he planned to apply for a permit from the Secretariat of Communications and Transport.

== See also ==
- Call sign
- Pirate radio
- Pirate radio in North America
- Los Dos Laredos
- Nuevo Laredo, Tamaulipas
- Laredo, Texas
