= XEPN-AM =

Former radio station in Piedras Negras, Coahuila

XEPN were the call letters of a border-blaster radio station licensed to Piedras Negras, Coahuila, Mexico.

It broadcast initially on 885 kHz with a power of 100 watts. The station was gone by the late 1930s, and in 1963, a new XEPN was created, this time on 920 kHz at Paracho, Michoacán. That station no longer exists.

== See also ==
- Border blaster
- John R. Brinkley
