= XHRF-FM =

IMER radio station in Ciudad Acuña, Coahuila

XHRF-FM and XERF-AM
Ciudad Acuña, Coahuila; Mexico
- Broadcast area: Northern Mexico, southern United States
- Frequencies: XHRF-FM: 103.9 FM (HD Radio); XERF-AM: 1570 AM
- Branding: La Poderosa

Programming
- Language(s): Spanish
- Subchannels: HD2: XHOF-FM Reactor; HD3: XHIMER-FM Opus

Ownership
- Owner: Instituto Mexicano de la Radio

History
- First air date: XHRF-FM: February 3, 2012; 14 years ago; XERF-AM: February 22, 1947

Technical information
- Licensing authority: Telecommunications Regulatory Commission (CRT)
- Class: XHRF-FM: AA; XERF-AM: A
- Power: XERF-AM: 100,000 watts
- ERP: XHRF-FM: 4,000 watts
- HAAT: XHRF-FM: −9.2 m (−30 ft)
- Transmitter coordinates: XHRF-FM: 29°20′57.6″N 101°02′05.5″W; XERF-AM: 29.35°N 101.033333°W

Links
- Webcast: Listen live
- Website: imer.mx

XHRF-FM (103.9 MHz) and XERF-AM (1570 kHz) are radio stations in Ciudad Acuña, Coahuila, Mexico. Originally only on the AM band, XERF is a Mexican Class A clear-channel station transmitting with 100,000 watts of power. Now branded as La Poderosa, XHRF-FM and XERF-AM simulcast their programming and are owned by the Instituto Mexicano de la Radio (IMER), a Mexican public broadcaster.

In earlier times, XERF was operated under the laws of Mexico by Ramón D. Bósquez and Arturo González, transmitting 250,000 watts as a border blaster, featuring famed disc jockey Wolfman Jack. XERF received its concession on November 26, 1947, and commenced operations, using the old facilities of John R. Brinkley's XERA, which ceased broadcasting in 1939. XERF was not a continuation of XERA.

== Cross-national operation (1949–1986) ==
The facilities of the old border blaster XERA, which had been created by John R. Brinkley, were confiscated by the Mexican government in 1939, and Villa Acuña did not have another high-power station until February 22, 1947, when the Compañía Radiodifusora de Coahuila, S.A., headed by Ramón D. Bósquez and Arturo González, signed XERF-AM on the air on 1570 kHz. The station used XERA's old transmission site, with a power of 50,000 watts (later increased to 100,000 watts); its first day of broadcasting included a formal opening featuring programs from the chambers of commerce of both Villa Acuña and Del Rio, Texas and the presence of the Bishop of Saltillo. For many years, the station made money by selling its time after nightfall to American evangelists who broadcast in English to the United States.

=== The 1959 border blaster ===
Prior to 1959, XERF retained the Wilson and Howard Radio Advertising Agency to handle its United States ad sales. In that year, Bósquez and González formed a Texas corporation called Inter-American Radio Advertising, Inc. which was located on Pecan Street in Del Rio, Texas. While XERF's concession remained with Compañía Radiodifusora de Coahuila, the actual control of the airtime and the management of the facilities in Ciudad Acuña were under the control of Inter-American Radio Advertising.

The Texas company purchased a 250,000 watt RCA transmitter to broadcast an omni-directional clear channel signal on AM 1570, which originated some distance from the old XERA facilities within three new prefabricated concrete buildings with flat roofs. The sales brochure for XERF offered this explanation about the operation of the station (emphasis and wording shown as in the original text):

There is, of course, one BIG difference between U.S. and Mexican Stations, and that is a matter of POWER; American Stations are limited a maximum 50,000 watts ... a limitation that does not exist under Mexican regulation. X.E.R.F. for example, is licensed to operate on 250,000 watts power, and the Department of Communication and Public Works of the Mexican Government has authorized a power increase to 500,000 watts. Such power could result in serious interference if wave lengths were not strictly maintained, but the equipment with which X.E.R.F., operates assures its signal to stay "right on the beam." This is something constantly checked by FCC monitor stations, a degree of regulation by the U.S. Government alike that is imposed upon U.S. Stations. Operating on a clear channel, X.E.R.F. is heard nightly in all parts of the fifty States in the United States, Canada and Latin-America.

Although reference was made to a power increase, the station only had an RCA 250,000 watt transmitter.

=== Paul Kallinger ===
The booming bass voice of Paul Kallinger was used to sell many of the products on XERF. At night, his recorded spots between the different sponsored shows served as a jingle break. Kallinger remained on the Texas side of the border and recorded his spots at a studio in Del Rio, because he did not want to become embroiled with the lawlessness that swirled around the XERF studio and transmitter on the other side of the border. In between the different religious programs, Kallinger would tell XERF listeners in various versions that:

It’s always good to know that we have some fine people out there listening to the most powerful commercial voice in the world ... From alongside the beautiful Rio Grande, this is XERF, Ciudad Acuña, Coahuila, Mexico. Our mailing address is Del Rio, Texas. This is Paul Kallinger.

As Mexican law required stations to identify in Spanish, the portion identifying the station's call letters and the station's location in Mexico, was then repeated in that language.

Kallinger, along with fellow XERF alumni Bill Mack, were inducted into the Texas Country Music Disc Jockey Hall of Fame in 1999 in recognition of their influence on the development of country music.

=== Wolfman Jack (1962–1964) ===
With the birth of rock and roll and its promotion by disc jockeys such as Alan Freed, a new interest was taken in the unrestricted superpower airwaves that were available in Mexico. Alan Freed had originally called himself the Moondog after hearing the name used by an experimental street musician in New York City. Freed not only adopted the name but used the recording of a howl to give his early broadcasts a unique character since he was featuring African-American music that was getting a great reception from America's White teenagers.

One of Freed's fans was Bob Smith, a disc jockey who also adopted the Moondog theme by calling himself Wolfman Jack and adding his own sound effects. Smith took his act to Inter-American Radio Advertising, who sent him to the studio and transmitter site of XERF. It was here that Wolfman Jack invented his own style of border blasting by turning the airwaves into one long infomercial featuring music and off-the-wall products.

Wolfman Jack gained a huge audience which brought in enough money to not only pay the bills, but to cause bandits and corrupt officials to also take enough interest in taking over his promotions for themselves. As a result, Smith began to pay his own security force to protect him; although he lived in Del Rio, Texas, because of the Brinkley Act, he had to actually broadcast from the station itself in Ciudad Acuña in Mexico.

=== Lawlessness and death ===
In April 1963, XERF returned to the headlines when armed men seized the station. Mexican authorities intervened, stationing federal troops to guard the station. In testimony, employees said they were chased, and that one armed man threatened Kallinger with a .45 pistol. After a legal dispute, a judge found in favor of Saúl Montes, the station's administrator, who put the station back on the air. In January 1964, a gun battle at the station left a 50-year-old man dead; his body was found on an adjoining ranch. Station personnel broadcast panicked pleas for help, prompting local residents to notify the authorities.

After the second gun battle, Bob Smith decided to leave for XERB, a border blaster in Tijuana and listenable in Los Angeles, California. It was this station that George Lucas featured in the 1973 movie American Graffiti.

Meanwhile, XERF reverted to selling time according to the old format devised by Dr. Brinkley. It featured paid programming, most of it from American fringe evangelists, right-wing political groups and Black Nationalist messages from the Nation of Islam. In 1969, a pastor sued the station for removing him from its air, alleging that the contract he had signed was for the duration of its broadcast concession. In the early 1970s, the station faced another lawsuit over contracts for airtime on XERF.

In early 1976, station employees who had been seeking back wages for 13 years, since the 1963 gunfight, won a victory in Mexican court, and Montes was appointed the sole administrator of XERF.

With the advent of FM stereo radio broadcasting, interest in the static-prone mono AM signals of XERF began to wane and its signal was switched from the 250 kilowatt RCA transmitter, which was never paid for and which consistently kept breaking down, to a new 50 kilowatt transmitter. Its program schedule consisted of primarily religious shows, and it did not broadcast during the day.

== Brief rebirth in the 1980s ==
In 1982, Bob Smith (Wolfman Jack) ran into a radio engineer friend named Mike Venditti, and he told Venditti that no one had been able to get XERF back on full power with its old RCA 250,000 watt transmitter, because RCA did not have any manuals relating to the equipment. Venditti then approached González with a business proposition.

=== Love 16 ===
In exchange for restoring the main RCA transmitter to active duty, Venditti asked González to lease him the daytime hours from 06:00 AM (UTC−06:00) to 06:00 PM (UTC−06:00). Because the station was only operating on a fraction of power from the 50,000 watt transmitter, XERF was not on the air during the day. At night, XERF reverted to its sponsored format of mainly American religious programs.

Venditti succeeded in getting the old transmitter to work, and at first, his new station Love 16 (a name taken from the 1570 AM frequency) broadcast an English language format composed of a mixture of soft rock, oldies, middle-of-the-road, country, and Big Band music, along with hourly ABC News newscasts. This format did not sell and soon Love 16 was programming a modern Christian music format. That did not work either.

Michael Venditti was a member of The Word Outreach Center, a Non-Denominational Church in Del Rio during this time. The church was pastored by Michael Kyle, a native of Del Rio and longtime broadcaster himself, having worked in both local radio stations and with Paul Kallinger. Michael Kyle worked an air shift at the station in Mexico when the format went to all music.

Before Venditti pulled the plug on Love 16, it attracted a lot of publicity in the Texas press concerning the rebirth of XERF as a real border blaster.

=== Texas Night Train ===
Another group from the Dallas and Fort Worth area then replaced Bill Mack with a nightly taped program called the Texas Night Train. Because the marathon shows which featured every type of popular music and comedy were taped, there was no problem with a lack of live landline connections. Weekend editions were also heard on some U.S. radio stations in Texas, including KXOL, an AM station in Fort Worth.

The show took telephone requests which were then mixed into the following-night program tape. Its big feature was the voice of the DJ, who was identified as the "Night Hawk", but who some mistook as a voice clone of Wolfman Jack. He was heralded over the sound effects of a massive steam train which gave the impression the Texas Night Train was chugging its way across Texas.

=== Wonderful Radio London ===
Another group that was also based in North Texas who were aware of the Bill Mack venture on XERF and the replacement of his time slot by the Texas Night Train were the owners of a company attempting to revive the British offshore station Wonderful Radio London. Headed by Ben Toney, who had been the original program manager for Big L in the 1960s, the new company also had links to Don Pierson who had founded the station in 1964. Ben Toney and his business associate went to Del Rio and met with attorney Arturo González in his law office, which he shared with Inter-American Radio Advertising, Inc.

Arturo González was of Mexican heritage and a U.S. citizen. He held an exclusive contractual arrangement with XERF's silent concession holders across the Rio Grande in Mexico. Arturo González was able to enforce his own contract with the concessionaire because his Inter-American Radio Advertising, Inc., held the purse strings to all of the money paid by American advertisers for airtime on XERF.

Built into the costs of operation were not only the expenses incurred from the electrical bills and basic engineering help, but from payments for the physical security of the station as well as the attorney's own profit margin. Little, if anything, was ever spent on studio, transmitter or tower equipment.

After concluding the arrangement with Arturo González in Del Rio, Ben Toney and his associate then drove across the Rio Grande and on to the dirt roads and through the shacks that led to the small antiquated studio and barn that housed the facilities of radio station XERF. It appeared that, with the new interest being shown in the station from Texas, it would be possible to restore the signal of the station to a dependable high-power strength using the old RCA 250,000 watt transmitter.

Beginning on August 13, 1984, the Wonderful Radio London Top 40 Show was heard nightly via taped programs which were recorded in England and flown to Texas. In 1984 British music was once again "invading" the US charts in a major way, just as it had in the 1960s. However, the U.S. charts were about 12 months behind the British music charts, and so Wonderful Radio London positioned itself as playing "tomorrow’s hits today". To accommodate the new schedule, the Texas Night Train was pushed back to allow the Big L show to serve as its lead-in beginning at midnight Texas time. Omnibus weekend editions of the Big L program were also heard on several US radio stations, including KXOL in Fort Worth.

The first of the daily Wonderful Radio London shows that were broadcast by XERF was introduced by the voice of John Lennon who was asked in 1964 what he thought about American commercial radio. On the second night, which was the anniversary of the close-down of the original Wonderful Radio London on August 14, 1967, airchecks were played beginning with the last Breakfast Show that had been broadcast. The program for August 14, 1984 began with a record dedicated to Ben Toney in 1967, who then cut in on the 1984 program to thank the DJ that he had personally hired 30 years earlier. This dedication was followed by the voices of Mick Jagger, Ringo Starr and many others all bidding the station farewell. The theme of the show was The Beatles’ You say goodbye and we say hello announcing the new programming that would begin the following night on August 15, 1984.

=== Constant transmitter problems ===
No sooner had the Wonderful Radio London Top 40 Show started when the Texas Night Train folded. Its demise was due to the same problem that Bill Mack had encountered. The Texas Night Train often disappeared into the static of the AM band when the XERF transmitter power dropped off. Advertisers would not buy time, and with mounting debts, the Texas Night Train came to the end of its line. Linking the owners of the Texas Night Train and Wonderful Radio London programs was KXOL in Fort Worth where both shows were also aired on weekends. KXOL was in the process of being sold, and Harold Glen Martin, who later returned to work at KXOL, was at that time the only live on-air personality at XERF. Using a "hillbilly" accent under the name of "Billy Purl", he presented a live country music program to fill the dead air on XERF. Martin claims the honor of being the last live voice heard on XERF. Billy Purl's gold lamé XERF jacket is part of the Rock and Roll Hall of Fame's border radio collection in Cleveland, Ohio.

=== Final proposition ===
To mark the exact date of its original start-up, Wonderful Radio London International (WRLI) was planning its own return as a full-time radio station broadcasting from off the coast of England beginning in December 1984. (This was during the period in which both Radio Caroline and Laser 558 were broadcasting successfully from ships off the British coast, though not without harassment from the authorities.) After the demise of The Texas Night Train marathon program, the WRLI team approached attorney Arturo González in Del Rio with a new proposal. Since XERF reception reports had been received from Europe when the power was maintained at 250,000 watts, it was proposed that Wonderful Radio London would take over the entirety of the hours after midnight Central Time. This would correspond to 6:00 am (UTC). Under the joint call sign of Wonderful Radio London via XERF and operating as a full-service station at full power, Big L would be able to attract both the additional funding and advertising necessary to also make the new offshore project into a commercial success.

== How commercial XERF faded away ==
However, time had run out for the superpower XERF when attorney Arturo González was forced to retire. His own age and the additional questionable legalities, among other things, of brokering a contract that would involve yet another country (the UK), would become more of a headache than he wanted at his time of life. Without his Texas sales connection, the silent owners of the ancient transmitter facilities also knew that the days of XERF were finally over.

When Arturo González was forced out of the picture due to corruption and alleged fraudulent issues, the Mexicans were left with out-of-date broadcasting facilities and a market that wanted both FM stereo and MTV on cable television. By this time the preachers had also drifted to cable outlets such as Jim Bakker’s PTL and Pat Robertson’s CBN cable television networks.

Additionally, regulatory changes on both sides of the border presented a grim panorama. On the American side, a new international radio agreement would diminish the coverage area of Mexican clear-channel stations by allowing American stations to set up shop on those frequencies; meanwhile, Mexico proposed changes to its broadcast law that would allow for operators to own their stations for 10 years, at which time the government would have the right to purchase a station for the depreciated value of its assets.

== XERF under IMER ==
Logo used before 2019

However, one Mexican group was highly interested in taking control of XERF for itself. In 1983, the federal government created the Instituto Mexicano de la Radio (IMER, Spanish: Mexican Radio Institute), which initially owned all of the radio stations which the government had come into owning through other agencies. Given XERF's geographic location, transmitter power, and status on a clear channel, the Mexican government considered XERF of strategic importance to acquire.

On February 22, 1986, IMER purchased the assets of Compañía Radiodifusora de Coahuila, S.A. and immediately took over operations of XERF. Five days later, in a special shareholders' meeting, Compañía Radiodifusora de Coahuila voted to dissolve itself. The concession was formally transferred to IMER on February 20, 1987. However, once IMER acquired XERF, it was left with the old, broken transmitter, for which there were no parts, and a second, 50,000 watt transmitter, which was also having problems, and XERF operated with only 15,000 watts.

In 2002, IMER began a modernization project nationwide. Special attention was paid to XERF, where IMER launched "Proyecto Ciudad Acuña" to improve the station's technical facilities and strengthen its vision for XERF. With the acquisition of a new transmitter, XERF raised its power to 100,000 watt in May 2004. On June 16, 2005, President Vicente Fox formally dedicated XERF's new facilities.

The goal of XERF under IMER is to provide a broadcast service that links migrating Mexicans to their original communities. The station's programming consists of news/talk programs and Mexican popular music.

=== AM—FM migration ===
As part of the Mexican government plan to move as many AM stations as possible to the FM band, XHRF-FM 103.9 MHz signed on February 3, 2012. The station, however, could not turn off its AM transmitter because doing so would leave a total of 404 people in 37 localities without any radio service whatsoever, resulting in the declaration of a continuity obligation that remains until some other radio service is provided to those 404 people.

=== HD Radio broadcast and programming ===
XHRF began broadcasts in HD Radio on October 28, 2012. The HD2 stream relays XHOF-FM Reactor, while HD3 features XHIMER-FM Opus, both IMER stations in Mexico City.

== See also ==
- Border blaster — a list of super-power radio stations located on the international border of Mexico facing the United States of America
- John R. Brinkley gives more details about the career of this "doctor".
- Wolfman Jack gives more details about the career of this disc jockey who was featured in the 1973 movie American Graffiti.
- Wonderful Radio London gives more details of the history of this station.
- Don Pierson gives more details about the career of this offshore broadcasting pioneer.
- ZZ Top celebrated the station in their song, "I Heard It On The X".
