= Del Rio–Ciudad Acuña International Bridge =

International bridge crossing the Mexico–United States border

Del Rio – Ciudad Acuña International Bridge
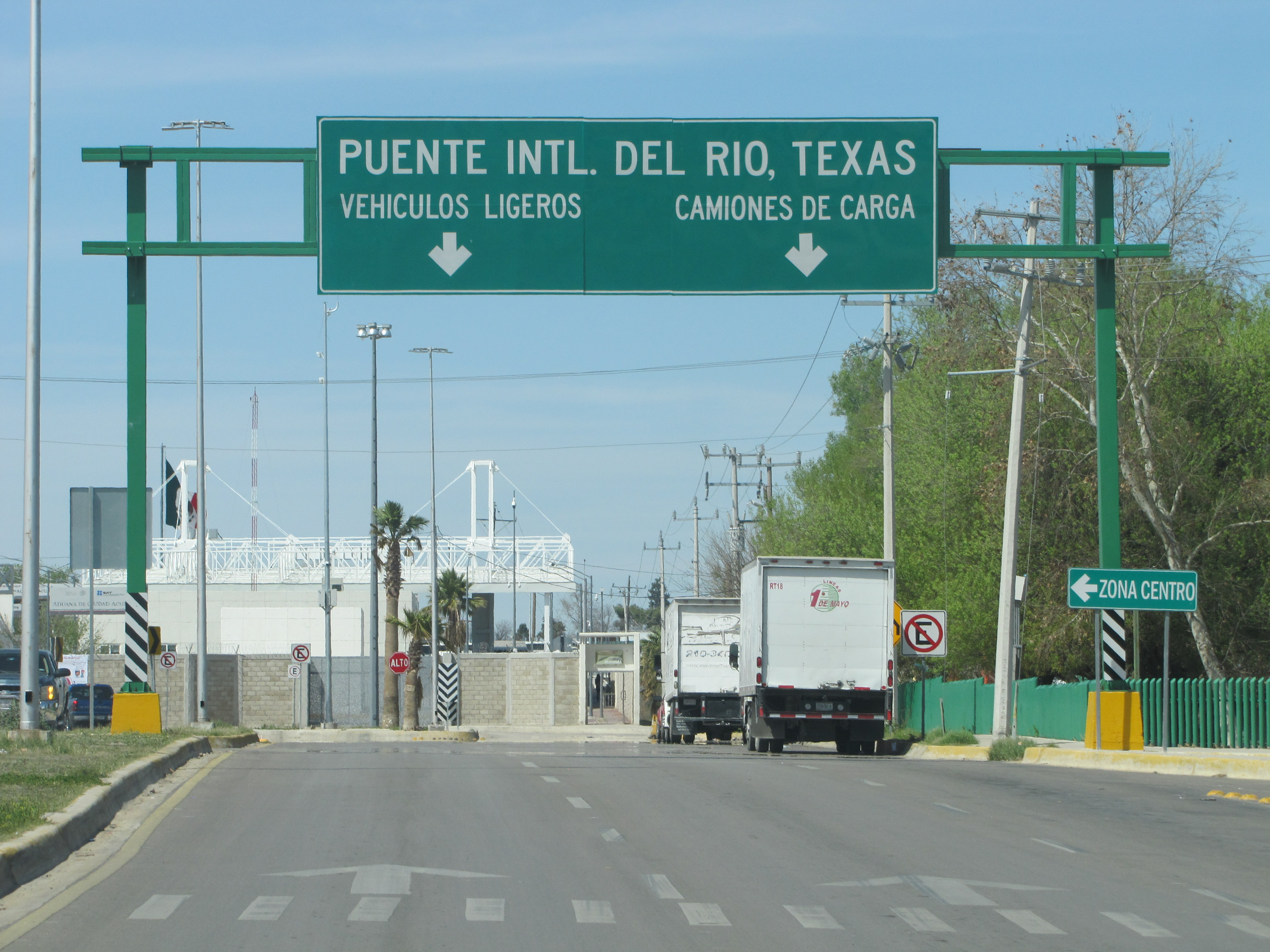
- Road heading to the bridge from Ciudad Acuña
- Coordinates: 29°19′36.32″N 100°55′39.05″W
- Crosses: Rio Grande
- Locale: Del Rio, Texas, US, and Ciudad Acuña, Coahuila, Mexico
- Owner: City of Del Rio

Characteristics
- Total length: 2,035 feet (620 m)

History
- Opened: 1930
- Rebuilt: 1987

Location
- Interactive map of Del Rio – Ciudad Acuña International Bridge

The Del Rio–Ciudad Acuña International Bridge is a border crossing over the Rio Grande, connecting the United States–Mexico border cities of Del Rio, Texas, US, and Ciudad Acuña, Coahuila, Mexico.

== Description ==
The bridge has four-lane wide by 2,035 ft (620 m) long. On the US side, the bridge is owned and operated by the City of Del Rio. In Mexico, it is under the ownership and administration of the federal transportation agency Caminos y Puentes Federales.

The Del Rio Port of Entry is located at this bridge.

The bridge is also known as Puente International Del Río (Del Río International Bridge), Puente Acuña (Acuña Bridge), and Puente Ciudad Acuña-Ciudad Del Río (Acuña and Del Río City Bridge).

== History ==
The Del Rio–Ciudad Acuña International Bridge spans across the Rio Grande, connecting the US-Mexico border cities of Del Rio, Texas, US and Ciudad Acuña, Coahuila, Mexico. The bridge was constructed in 1930 and rebuilt in 1987.

=== 2021 migrant surge ===
In mid-September 2021, a large group of migrants, almost all from Haiti, attempted to enter the U.S. by crossing the shallow Rio Grande and seeking shelter beneath the bridge, where they lived in unhealthy conditions. The crowd grew from a few hundred to thousands within a week, initially overwhelming authorities.

By September 24, 2021, all of the approximately 15,000 migrants were cleared from their encampment underneath the bridge. The U.S. Department of Homeland Security (DHS) reported that about 8,000 migrants departed to Mexico voluntarily; 2,000 migrants were expelled to Haiti on 17 DHS-organized flights, and 5,000 were placed in DHS processing to determine if they would be expelled or assigned to an immigration removal proceeding. (Note: Some of the migrants are applying for asylum in the U.S. Of those permitted to remain in the U.S. pending hearings, some were permitted to go to New York, Boston and Miami.)

== See also ==
- List of international bridges in North America
