= Ciudad =

Ciudad (Spanish: [θjuˈðað]) is the Spanish word for "city".

Ciudad or La Ciudad may also refer to:

Places:

- La Ciudad (archaeological site), Hohokam ruins in Phoenix, Arizona
- La Ciudad, nickname for Ciudad de México (Mexico City), the national capital of Mexico
- La Ciudad, district of Durango City, the state capital of Durango, Mexico
- La Ciudad, local name for Pueblo Nuevo, Durango, especially as a municipial capital (before the 1920s)

Media:

- Ciudad, a 1998 film directed by Balthasar Burkhard
- Ciudad, a Philippine band
- La ciudad, a novel by Mario Levrero published in 1970
- La Ciudad, the Spanish title of the 1998 David Riker film The City
- "La Ciudad", a song by Odesza from their 2017 album A Moment Apart
- TV Ciudad, a Uruguayan television channel
