= XHLO-FM =

Radio station in Chihuahua, Chihuahua, Mexico

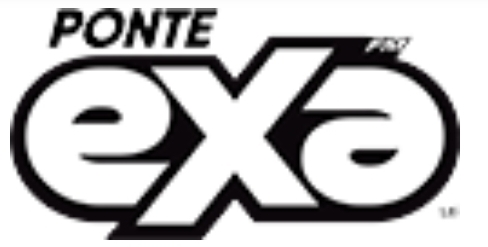
- Chihuahua, Chihuahua; Mexico
- Frequency: 100.9 MHz
- Branding: Exa FM

Programming
- Format: Contemporary hit radio
- Affiliations: MVS Radio

Ownership
- Owner: Sucesión de Guillermo López Borja
- Sister stations: XHHEM-FM

History
- First air date: October 25, 1976
- Former call signs: XELO-AM (1976–2013)
- Former frequencies: 1010 kHz (1976–2013)
- Call sign meaning: For original concessionaire Guillermo López Borja

Technical information
- Licensing authority: Comisión Reguladora de Telecomunicaciones
- Class: B1
- ERP: 15,220 watts
- HAAT: −22.5 m (−74 ft)
- Transmitter coordinates: 28°37′15″N 106°06′27.34″W

Links
- Webcast: Listen live
- Website: ExaFM.com

Previous logo used from 2015 to 2016

XHLO-FM is a radio station in Chihuahua, Chihuahua, Mexico. It broadcasts on 100.9 FM and carries the Exa FM format from MVS Radio.

== History ==
XELO was originally the call sign of a border-blaster radio station licensed to the Ciudad / Juarez area of Chihuahua, Mexico. At different times, these same call letters were also assigned to other Mexican stations based in Nogales, Sonora, and Piedras Negras, Coahuila.

On October 25, 1976, the XELO call sign returned, this time to Chihuahua, on a new 1 kW daytimer, XELO-AM. By the time the 1990s rolled around, the station had upgraded its power to 5 kW day and .5 kW night. The station moved to FM in 2011.

In 2013, the 1010 AM frequency was shut down.
