= Radio Insurgente =

Zapatista radio station

Radio Insurgente is the official voice of the Zapatista Army of National Liberation (EZLN).The radio station has been operating since August 2003 and it is independent from the Mexican government. Its broadcasting location is unknown. Radio Insurgente's content is focused on promoting the ideas and struggles of the Zapatista movement. Radio Insugente transmits programs in Spanish and in the indigenous languages Tzotzil, Tzeltal, Chol and Tojolabal. According to their website, they transmit "from various places in Chiapas directed to the Zapatista bases, the insurgentes and milicians, the commanders and local people in general". No new programs have been posted on the website since 2009, but CDs are on sale on the site and users can listen to previous content.

== History ==
There was a prior attempt to create a Zapatista radio network in 1998 with Radio Rebelde to cover human rights violations and provide political commentary that does not seem to have ever gained much traction. The radio station was first transmitted via short wave frequency in 2001 during a high-profile Zapatista gathering in Ovente, Chiapas. With the start of Radio Insurgente in 2003, many people arranged meetings and brought their own radio sets to mark the occasion and hear the first words "broadcast" by the network, which actually came via a CD that was played through loudspeakers.

Radio Insurgente has also used criticism and humor since its first broadcast, when it mocked U.S. foreign policy, Silvio Berlusconi, Tony Blair, José María Aznar, the King of Spain, and Judge Baltasar Garzón. It has also made fun of the low wattage of its stations, stating that "We broadcast with such little power that not even electronic Viagra can raise it."

Since it launched it has experienced technical glitches. Prior to the launch of Radio Insurgentes, the EZLN transmitted content over clandestine FM stations. To get started, the Zapatistas built an "egg carton-lined studio" to transmit their programs. They have also trained themselves on how to operate the radio station; the group has also trained young women insurgents on producing radio content. The radio station is also completely portable; insurgents can take it up to the mountain in the morning and back down at night.

Mexican broadcast laws require individuals to have a permit or concession to broadcast a radio signal, but the government makes it difficult for individuals to get a permit through red tape and other provisions. It is not uncommon for tiny wattage radio stations to pop up in Mexico, but they are often shut down by the government. The station was not sanctioned by any national laws and lacked a proper license, yet the San Andrés Accords between the EZLN and the Mexican government held that the indigenous communities had a right to broadcast their own content.

In 2004, the station started a website where they archived recordings of their programs and sold CD copies. The website also archives the communiqués and speeches given by the EZLN leader, Subcomandante Marcos.

In July 2006, Subcomandante Marcos was prevented from appearing on XENK-AM Radio 620 in Mexico City because of a fear the state would discontinue advertising on the station. Hosts of the show expressed shock at the incident, and there was a protest outside of the radio station's offices.

== Objectives ==
Self-proclaimed as "La Voz de los sin Voz", which translates to "The Voice of the Voiceless", Radio Insurgente's objective is to diffuse the ideals of the Zapatista movement through shortwave radio, FM radio, their website, and CD-productions. Furthermore, Radio Insurgente aims to inform listeners of the progress of the autonomy process within the Zapatista zones and promote the words and music of the indigenous Chiapas communities. Radio Insurgente is an Information and communications technology (ICT) that merges traditional forms of communication with new information technologies. This braiding of old and new forms of communication technologies is what allows Radio Insurgente to be so successful, as it can simultaneously reach the rural populations through the more traditional medium of radio and reach the urban populations through the more modern medium of the Internet. The Internet audio version of the radio network was launched in November 2004 to celebrate the 21st anniversary of the EZLN movement and focused on recordings of local indigenous musicians and story-tellers to political speeches by movement leaders and helped to serve as a recorded history of Mexico's indigenous people.

The Mexican army has been known to surround Zapatista communities and unleash terror on indigenous people via their soldiers and paramilitary. The EZLN has said that access to and control of the media are vital for its survival and have thus worked quietly to build their capacities in order to speak directly to their people. When Radio Insurgente first began broadcasting, the popular music that they played combined with the reading of "saludos" from their listeners led some government loyalists to unknowingly tune in.

== Programming ==
Radio Insurgente broadcasts daily on various frequencies in FM (according to the region). Besides Spanish, it also broadcasts in indigenous languages Tzotzil, Tzeltal, Ch'ol and Tojolab'al. Its broadcasts includes reports on breaking news affecting the Zapitista and Indigenous communities in the area. An example of the news Radio Insurgentes reports on can be seen in their April 10, 2005 report in which community leaders from Zinacantan went to see the municipal authorities to demand potable water in their community. On their way, they were attacked by thugs from the Party of the Democratic Revolution. Radio Insurgente reporters happen to be at the scene and were able to interview members of the community that were attacked.

Radio Insurgente produces a weekly one-hour radio program on Fridays. The one-hour program focuses on current events in Chiapas, the history of the EZLN, indigenous women's rights and many other subjects. It also features educational messages, local music, short stories and radio-novels. The people of Mexico and the Americas are the targeted audiences of its weekly program in Spanish, but there are also interested persons from other countries. Programs are archived and audience can listen to or download the weekly programs and special programs on the official website of Radio Insuegente.

The weekly programs are intended for audiences in Mexico and the Americas, but "also for Europe, Africa, Asia and the Australian Continent."

== Production and support ==
Currently there are 17 Radio Insurgente productions being sold at a price range from 7 to 12 Euros. These CDs vary from political radio broadcasts to indigenous music of the region.

Radio Insurgente is supported by donations, and selling and distribution of their CDs and cassette tapes with their original content. A significant source of their revenue is assumed to come from Europe, where the EZLN has gained sympathy from European Zapitista supporters.

Radio Insurgente, according to their official website, broadcasts primarily through the following frequencies in the state of Chiapas: (according to the region in Mexico)

- For the Zona Altos de Chiapas (tzotzil, tzeltal, chol...) on 97.9 MHz FM
- For the Zona Selva Fronteriza (tzeltal, tojolabal...) on 97.9 MHz FM
- For the Zona Selva Tzeltal on 100.1 MHz and 89.3 MHz FM
- For the Zona Norte (tzotzil, tzeltal, chol...) on 102.1 MHz FM
- For the Zona Zotz Choj (tzeltal, tojolabal...) on 92.9 MHz FM

== See also ==
- Radio Venceremos - Rebel Radio station created by the leftist guerilla group FMLN during the civil war in El Salvador.
