= XEROK-AM =

Radio station in Ciudad Juárez

Currently silent
- Ciudad Juárez, Chihuahua; Mexico
- Frequency: 800 kHz

Ownership
- Owner: Emisiones Radiofónicas, S.A. de C.V.

History
- First air date: 1936
- Former call signs: XEPNA (1934–1936); XELO-AM (1936–1970s)
- Call sign meaning: Station branded as "X-Rock"

Technical information
- Class: A
- Power: 50,000 watts
- Transmitter coordinates: 31°41′44″N 106°23′1″W

XEROK-AM (800 AM) is a silent commercial radio station in Ciudad Juárez, Chihuahua, Mexico. It was licensed to operate with a power of 150,000 watts, although in recent times, it ran 50,000 watts. XEROK has been dark since April 4, 2022, due to the dismantling of its transmitter facility.

XEROK is the dominant Class A station on 800 AM, a Mexican clear channel frequency. The station had a colorful history as a border blaster, aiming its programming at listeners in the United States, when at night, its non-directional 150,000-watt signal could be easily heard in many parts of the Southwest.

== History ==
=== Piedras Negras ===
The licensing history for XEROK begins in 1936, not in Ciudad Juárez but in Piedras Negras, Coahuila, 413 miles (665 km) away. Its first call sign was XEPNA (more commonly XEPN), operating on 660 AM. The concession was held by the Compañia Radiodifusora de Piedras Negras (Piedras Negras Broadcasting Company). The call sign changed to XELO in 1936, authorized for daytime operation at 50,000 watts from Piedras Negras. It then moved to 1110 kHz.

It was the first station in Piedras Negras, operated by W. E. Branch and Claudio Bres Jáuregui from studios at the Hotel del Ferrocarril. From its earliest days, its programming was directed at U.S. listeners. It reportedly earned 95 percent of its advertising revenue from American accounts. The binational structure of the radio station caused tax issues in the United States, where a sister company, The Radio Service Co., had been established in Eagle Pass, Texas, across the border. In Eagle Pass, it made $72,000 in advertising revenue in 1936 and $66,000 in 1937. That drew the scrutiny of the Internal Revenue Service (IRS), triggering a lawsuit that the company won. A spark in XELO's transmitter facilities knocked it off the air. That would serve as a pretext for the station to relocate from Piedras Negras to Ciudad Juárez.

=== Move to Ciudad Juarez ===
When the station relocated to Ciudad Juárez, it moved to 800 kHz, one of the clear channel frequencies newly allocated to Mexico by the North American Regional Broadcasting Agreement (NARBA). That allowed it to triple its power. The 150 kW plant was custom-built in 1940–1941 by a team led by William "Bill" Branch, an early well-known radio engineer. Branch built a series of amplifiers to get electricity from a low power oscillator level to the 150 kW level. Modulation was achieved by a Doherty amplifier, which while complicated, allowed extremely high levels (exceeding 100% positive), of modulation and did not require a large and generally poor-performing "Modulation Reactor", i.e. audio coupling transformers.

It became one of the border blaster stations aimed at American listeners at night. The long time format was Spanish-language programs by day for listeners in Ciudad Juarez. But at night, when the station could be heard around the Southwest, it carried paid brokered time programs often in English, targeted to audiences in the U.S. "Carr Collins Crazy Water Crystals," a mineral treatment and patent medicine, was a well known advertiser, as was "Baby Chicks by Mail". Some listeners remember hearing religious programs on the station, sometimes with offers for listeners to send money in exchange for "autographed photos of J. Christ of Biblical fame". The station frequently aired a radio evangelist who for five dollars offered listeners "your free autographed picture of Jesus Christ with eyes that glow in the dark.

The advertisers used post office box addresses in the U.S. to make it easy for listeners to send money. In the years following World War II and around the time of the Korean War, U.S. troops returning from the Orient heard their first US-based radio broadcasts from this station while tuning in a transistor radio on a ship crossing the Pacific Ocean.

=== Top 40 XEROK ===
The daytime line-up moved in 1972 to a U.S. station, KAMA 1060 (later KXPL) in El Paso, Texas. Around that time, a group of American investors (Grady Sanders, Bob Hanna, John Ryman and Bruce Miller Earle) leased the station and began playing English-language Top 40 hits. The XELO call letters were changed to XEROK, with ROK representing rock and roll.

In the 1970s and into the 1980s, the station promoted itself as X-Rock 80, The Sun City Rocker due to its proximity to the "Sun City", a nickname for El Paso. It had colorful disc jockeys and used contests and jingles to appeal to young listeners in Texas and New Mexico.

=== Recorded broadcasts ===
It is not generally known that XEROK was live in only brief periods of operation due to Mexican government restrictions on foreign language programming. At the beginning the programs were recorded, in real time, on tape. The reels were carried by messenger from El Paso to the Mexican transmitter site where they played after a 24-hour delay, a concept similar to voice-tracking used by many stations today.

This allowed the DJs to announce real clock times, but not material that would be required to be accurate and timely, such as current weather conditions and temperature readings. The exception, by 1975, was the morning drive time program, which was on a 4-hour delay that allowed for timely news and weather reports. Later, the recordings were made 12 hours ahead of time. Still later the station ran several parallel studios so that four shifts were recorded at a time.

In 1977-78 studios were used at the tower near Satélite, Chihuahua, for live operation. Eventually, the owners were granted permission from the FCC to install a 950 MHz studio-transmitter link (STL) across the border to feed the transmitter from El Paso with live programming. The Mexican government also agreed to this arrangement but later, the end of station's Top 40 format halted the STL connection and all programming came out of the local Mexican studios after that.

=== Later years ===
XEROK format of Top 40 hits gave it a sizable following in El Paso, and much of the Southwest. But by the 1980s, young people were tuning in FM stations to hear the current hits. In El Paso, KINT-FM 97.5 became the top station for contemporary music. In 1982, XEROK began a full-time, Spanish-language format as "Radio Cañón", no longer broadcasting in English.

The station was taken silent on April 4, 2022. The decision to stop broadcasting was made when XEROK's transmitter had to be dismantled.

== Transmitter and facilities ==
The station usually operated with 50,000 watts by day, even though it was authorized to put out 150,000 watts, three times the maximum of most U.S. AM stations. The station's extra power would be wasted by day, as the ground wave coverage area around Ciudad Juarez and El Paso was mostly unpopulated. By night, the skywave transmission was helped by extra power sometimes to as high as 150,000 watts.

The transmitter, built by radio engineer Bill Branch, was used until 1971, when a CCA transmitter was installed. It was also the cause of Branch's death in 1946, when he received a fatal shock while working on it. Later the station installed a Continental Electronics 150 kW unit. The Continental required a couple of minutes to change from low to high power settings, with the manual operation of switches in the front and the back. The station more recently used a 50 kW Harris DX-50. XEROK's offices and studios in El Paso were at 2100 Trawood Drive at Lomaland Drive, now the location of Grupo Radio Centro's El Paso operations, including English-language Top 40 station XHTO-FM.
