= Border blaster =

Radio broadcast station targeting a foreign country

A border blaster is a broadcast station that, though not licensed as an external service, is, in practice, used to target another country. The term "border blaster" is of North American origin, and usually associated with Mexican AM stations whose broadcast areas cover large parts of the United States, and United States border AM stations covering large parts of Canada. Conceptually similar European broadcasting included some pre-World War II broadcasting towards the United Kingdom, "radio périphérique" around France and the U.S. government-funded station Radio Free Europe, targeting European countries behind the Iron Curtain.

With broadcasting signals far more powerful than those of U.S. stations, the Mexican border blasters could be heard over large areas of the U.S. from the 1940s to the 1970s, often to the great irritation of American radio stations, whose signals could be overpowered by their Mexican counterparts. These are also sometimes referred to as X stations for their call letters: Mexico assigns callsigns beginning with XE or XH to broadcast stations.

On November 9, 1972, in Washington, D.C., the United States and Mexico signed an "Agreement Concerning Frequency Modulation Broadcasting in the 87.5 to 108 MHz Band". Since then, in the FM band power levels and frequency assignments have been set by mutual agreement between the two countries. AM radio border blasters still exist, though they are largely ignored due to the decline of AM radio in the U.S. and in Mexico. There are several such stations licensed by Mexico's Secretariat of Communications and Transportation using transmitters with an effective radiated power similar to those of major licensed commercial stations located within the U.S.

== Background ==
In contrast to pirate radio stations which broadcast illegally, border blasters are generally licensed by the government upon whose soil they are located. Pirate radio stations are freebooters from offshore, outside the territorial waters of the nation they target, or ones that are illegally operating in defiance of national law within its sovereign territory. They also contrast with shortwave radio broadcasters, which operate on frequencies expressly designated for international broadcasts, whereas border blasters use frequencies designated for domestic broadcasts.

=== Mexico to U.S. ===
In Mexico and the US, while the federal government of the US did not particularly like them, the stations were allowed to flourish. W. Lee O'Daniel used a border blaster in his successful campaign for governor of Texas. The US, unlike the UK, has never required a license to listen to broadcast radio or television. The only restriction placed upon border-blasters was a law which prohibited studios in the US from linking by telephone to border-blaster transmitters in Mexico. This law, part of the Brinkley Act, was introduced in the wake of John R. Brinkley's fraudulent medical advice program on XERA. The Brinkley Act remains on the books in the US, but licenses under that act are now routinely granted as long as the station follows applicable US and Mexican regulations.

The pop culture inspired by the border blaster stations is extensive: the 1971 Doors song "The WASP (Texas Radio and the Big Beat)", ZZ Top's song "Heard It on the X" (1975), "The Wolfman of Del Rio" by Terry Allen on his 1979 album Lubbock (On Everything), 1983's "Mexican Radio" by Wall of Voodoo, and 1987's "Border Radio" movie theme by The Blasters.

=== Europe ===
A similar situation developed in Europe, beginning with Radio Luxembourg after World War II. The British government identified these stations as pirates because the Sunday broadcast was reserved for British listeners (deliberately coinciding with the BBC Sundays of religious programmes). The broadcasts were considered illegal on British soil as these stations were breaking the monopoly of the non-commercial BBC. (Coincidentally, a large percent of the Republic of Ireland could receive spillover from Northern Ireland, Wales and the west of England BBC TV and radio broadcasts for decades.) Listening to the broadcasts was technically a violation of UK radio-license laws of the day. The same "radio périphérique", or "peripheral radio", phenomenon existed in France from the 1930s until the legalization of private broadcasting in the early 1980s, which allowed Radio Luxembourg from Luxembourg, Radio Andorre and Sud Radio from Andorra, Radio Monte Carlo from Monaco, and Europe 1 from Saarland, Germany, to begin legally broadcasting signals across international borders.

The British government created countermeasures after World War II: the state-owned telephone monopoly prevented studios in Britain from linking by telephone to the transmitters of Radio Luxembourg. These restrictions were mostly lifted following the privatisation and demonopolisation of the UK telephone system.

In Slovenia, TV Koper-Capodistria was especially historically a de-facto semi official border blaster, as its signals can be received well throughout Northeast Italy and some of the first private local stations often retransmitted the signal from Nanos on ch. E27. It was particularly popular in the 70s due to transmitting in color before RAI did and might have influenced Italy's decision to use PAL as the color standard. However by the late 1980s and early 1990s it started losing relevance as private TV stations started spreading and eventually blanketing the signal.

Likewise, RAI itself was a de facto border blaster, with its TV signals being receivable in modern day Slovenia and Croatia since 1954, when RAI started transmitting on ch. E5 from Monte Venda, two years before the start of TV service in Yugoslavia. Later on, many local and regional private TV stations in Veneto and Friuli Venezia Giulia also became de-facto border blasters due to high power without attenuating the beams towards Slovenia and Croatia. This was also the case for Albania, with many Albanians during Hoxha's rule relying on Italian TV for information on the outside world. For local stations this persisted into the digital era with many maintaining ERPs of hundreds of kilowatts without attenuation towards the horizon, until the late 2022 UHF spectrum reorganizing where the 700 MHz band was freed for mobile networks, as well as most local muxes ceasing transmissions in favor of RAI and Mediaset's local TV muxes.

Italian FM stations are still de-facto border blasters, being receivable in coastal Slovenia and Croatia even with very modest antenna setups.

=== Northern U.S. and Canada ===
Signals of many US and Canada radio stations (and to a lesser extent television outlets) encroach on neighboring territory. Such stations are usually not deemed "border blasters," as their programming is not primarily targeted at listeners and viewers across the border. US and Canadian stations adhere to comparable maximum power levels, and the encroachment is regarded as unintentional and largely unavoidable. However, in areas where a US radio station is close to a significantly larger Canadian metropolitan area (or vice versa), true border blasters do exist.

An exception to that general rule is KRPI located in Ferndale, Washington. It is owned by BBC Broadcasting, Inc., a Washington state company with studios in Richmond, British Columbia. The station airs a mixture of music, news and talk focused on the South Asian communities in Metro Vancouver. To improve reception of the station within its target market, KRPI applied and received an FCC construction permit to increase its nighttime power from 10 to 50 kilowatts, change the community it served and move its transmitter from Ferndale to Point Roberts, a community adjacent to the Canada–US border. The move has attracted much criticism from the local citizens of Point Roberts and the adjacent densely populated community of Tsawwassen, British Columbia, because it would cause harmful blanketing interference.

Another possible exception to that general rule on the Canadian side was CKLW in Windsor, Ontario, across the river from Detroit. Originally licensed as a Class II-B (now Class B) station and always operating in full compliance with the technical specifications and operating rules of its CRTC licence (i.e., protection of the entire Mexican border nights and protection of co-channel Canadian stations days and nights), CKLW's 50,000-watt directional signal blanketed much of Michigan and northern Ohio east to Cleveland days and nights, and south to Toledo, Lima and Dayton in the daytime. American-owned until 1970 as part of the RKO General chain (along with such other top 40 powerhouses as KHJ in Los Angeles and KFRC in San Francisco), it functioned essentially as a Detroit-market station during the 1960s and 1970s. Its Motown-flavored personality Top 40 format made it one of the most highly rated stations in the Midwestern US. The decline of AM radio as a music source in the 1970s, combined with new Canadian government rules imposing domestic ownership of and minimum domestic music content on Canadian-based stations, made it difficult for CKLW to continue to compete for listeners with Detroit-based, US-licensed FM music stations, which offered clean stereo sound and faced no program content or music playlist restrictions. CKLW abandoned the Top 40 format and its efforts to compete in the Detroit market in the 1980s. Today it is a news/talk station aimed largely at an Ontario audience, though still containing a significant amount of American syndicated talk.

WLYK is another example of a border blaster, broadcasting from a transmitter in New York State and serving the adjacent Kingston, Ontario, area; its operator My Broadcasting Corporation (through its 1234567 Corporation) holds an ownership stake in its U.S.-based licensee. Numerous stations in northern New York target larger cities in Ontario and Quebec in addition to their local areas of New York, including (but not limited to) WYSX targeting Brockville; WRCD, WVLF and WMWA targeting Cornwall; and WQLR and WBTZ targeting Montreal. By contrast under CRTC regulations, Canadian radio stations must be operated from studios within the country.

Attempts at border-blasting were somewhat more common on the other side of the border, where smaller markets in the United States could find lucrative larger markets in Canada within their broadcast range. WIVB-TV, prior to the digital television transition, could be seen as a U.S. border blaster into Canada (as Western New York is a smaller market than Southern Ontario, which boasts the major world city of Toronto); it operated with 100,000 watts of power on the VHF low band (channel 4), even after the Federal Communications Commission reduced the maximum allowed power for that band to 80,000 watts. (WIVB did not make significant attempts to reach the Canadian market, although rival station WKBW-TV did.) Another famous U.S.-based border blaster into Canada was KCND-TV in Pembina, North Dakota; Pembina was a small border town of less than 1,000 residents, which normally would be far too small a market to support a television station, but spent its fifteen-year existence targeting Winnipeg, a much larger city sixty miles north of Pembina. Likewise, the small market of Burlington, Vermont, and Plattsburgh, New York, found it could reach a larger audience in Montreal. Canadian regulators put in simultaneous substitution requirements to prevent losing revenue to these American border-blasters (this forced KCND's owners to sell the station to Canadian interests, who transformed the station into modern-day Winnipeg, Manitoba-based CKND-TV; Burlington station WFFF-TV entered into a famous cross-border scheduling feud over the simsub problems, while WKBW, after unsuccessfully suing to bar the CRTC from enforcing it on systems that only operate in one province in 1977, competed mainly by focusing on its unique brand of local news, which could not be simsubbed). Also in Western New York, radio station WTOR is licensed to the northwesternmost municipality in the region (Youngstown), operates with a directional signal covering Southern Ontario but very little American territory, and is brokered to a Canadian ethnic broadcaster based in Mississauga; it maintains its U.S. license and transmitter site as a legal fiction, with ethnic broadcaster Sima Birach holding the station's license and claiming himself as "operations manager" even as he seldom appears at the station's nominal U.S. studio in person.

In the west, KVOS-TV in Bellingham, Washington, targeted an audience in Vancouver and Victoria for many years. In fact, KVOS' inaugural broadcast, in June 1953, was a kinescope film of the Coronation of Queen Elizabeth II, which was broadcast over KVOS as Vancouver's CBC Television station, CBUT, had yet to sign on.

At least one border blaster targets the Russian Far East: KICY broadcasts its religious programming on a 50,000-watt clear-channel directional signal pointed due west from the Seward Peninsula, one of the westernmost land masses in North America.

== Programming ==
Most border blaster stations today program Spanish-language programming targeted at the Mexican side of the border. Some of the Spanish language border blasters target the growing Latino audience living in the southwestern US. Some target both.

As was the case between the 1930s and the 1970s, some border blaster stations in areas near larger American border cities such as San Diego are leased out by American broadcasting companies and air English-language programming targeting American audiences, although the AM stations have sometimes been supplanted by FM signals just over the border and able to reach major American cities like San Diego or El Paso with city-grade signals. During those decades border radio was used by preachers who solicited donations, and advertisers who sold products of dubious value. The American side leases the station from the Mexican station owners/license holders and feeds programming from their American studios to the Mexican transmitters via satellite.

Due to Mexican government regulations, these stations must air the Mexican national anthem at midnight and 6 a.m. daily, the government-produced radio magazine La Hora Nacional on Sunday nights, and 48 minutes of tiempos oficiales (public service announcements from the Mexican government, which include campaign ads during elections) per-day, and give station identification in Spanish. This is usually done softly or during commercial breaks so the listeners on the American side won't usually notice it. The PSA requirement has produced controversy even amongst officials in Mexico, for reasons including reinforcing negative perceptions of the country, taking up airtime that could be used to promote cross-border tourism and interactions instead, and their poor quality.

== Geographical list of border blasters ==
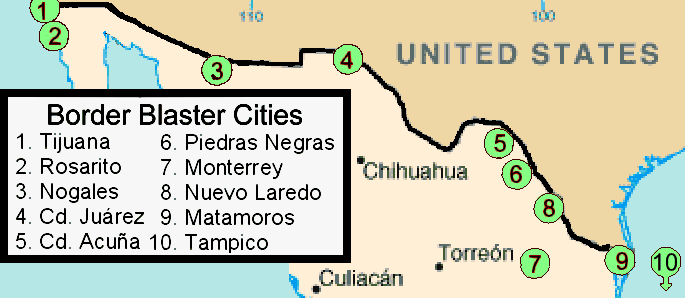
Border blaster cities

=== Baja California ===
==== Tijuana / Rosarito ====
- XEPRS-AM: This is the radio station, formerly known as XERB, featured in the George Lucas movie American Graffiti starring Wolfman Jack as the disc jockey. He moved to this station following his work on XERF.
- XHPRS-FM: This is the FM counterpart to XEPRS-AM.
- XETRA-FM
- XETRA-AM
- XEAK-AM
- XELO-AM
- XHITZ-FM: Broadcasts with an English top 40 format targeted exclusively at San Diego.
- XHMORE-FM
- XHRM-FM
- XHRST-FM
- XETV-TDT: Owned and operated by Televisa. From the station's launch in 1953 to 2017, programming and sales rights were managed by Bay City Television, Inc. (a California-based corporation). Afterwards, it converted to a Canal 5 relay, with signal remained to cover the Spanish community on the American side of the border.
- XHAS-TDT: programming originates in San Diego but is sent to a transmitter in Tijuana

=== La Rumorosa ===
- XHMIX-FM

=== Sonora ===
==== San Luis Río Colorado ====
- XHSLR-FM: Targeted to listeners In Yuma County, Arizona
- XECB-AM

==== Heroica Nogales ====
- XHRZ-FM
- XHSN-FM

==== Agua Prieta ====
- XHNNO-FM
- XHSAP-FM
- XHSOS-FM

=== Chihuahua ===
==== Ciudad Juárez ====
- XEROK-AM
- XEJ-AM
- XHGU-FM
- XHH-FM
- XHPX-FM
- XHUAR-FM
- XHNZ-FM
- XHTO-FM

=== Coahuila ===
==== Ciudad Acuña ====
- XER: "Sunshine Station between the Nations" broadcasting on AM at 735 kHz. This was the original station licensed to John R. Brinkley in Mexico as the Villa Acuña Broadcasting Company. It first signed on August 18, 1932, with a 50 kW transmitter and claimed 75 kW ERP via an omnidirectional antenna. The engineering was by Will Branch of Fort Worth who had engineered WBAP for Amon Carter, owner of the Fort Worth Star-Telegram. It was shut down by the Mexican authorities on February 24, 1933, and the Villa Acuña Broadcasting Company was dissolved.
- XERA: In September 1935 Brinkley gained a new license for Villa Acuña from the Government of Mexico with new call letters of XERA. His new operating company was Cía Mexicana Radiodifusora Fronteriza and the station came on the air from the same location as the old XER but with a directional antenna. His new transmitter power was 500 kW, but with his new antenna he claimed an output of 1MW. XERA called itself "the world's most powerful broadcasting station" and Variety magazine claimed that it could be heard in New York City. Following the signing of various treaties, the Government of Mexico revoked the license of XERA in the closing days of 1939.
- XERF-AM: from 1947. The station that made Wolfman Jack world famous for his disc jockey and sales presentations between 1962 and 1964. This station came on the air long after the era of both XERA and Brinkley, but it initially used his old facilities although the powerful transmitter of XERA had been dismantled and shipped elsewhere. The station later moved to a new building where a 250 kW RCA main transmitter was installed. The RCA "Ampliphase" transmitter has not been operational for many decades.

==== Piedras Negras ====
- XEPN-AM was sister station to XER/XERA, and was also controlled by John Brinkley.
- XELO-AM

=== Nuevo León ===
==== Monterrey ====
- XEG-AM: In 1950 the advertising time of this station came under the control of Harold Schwartz of Chicago, who also came to represent XERB near Tijuana/Rosarito (the station made famous in the movie American Graffiti.) From the late 1960s through the early 1980s, XEG was known for its nighttime Black/R&B/Disco music programming block, transcribed from KGFJ, Los Angeles. XEG ran a huge 150 kW signal at night, with 50 kW daytime, on 1050 kHz.
- XET-AM, nicknamed La T Grande, went on the air in 1930, made the Carter Family music well known in the 1930s.

=== Tamaulipas ===
==== Matamoros ====
- XELD-TV: This station, owned in a joint venture between Romulo O'Farrill and Emilio Azcárraga, signed on in 1951 as Mexico's third television station on air, the first outside Mexico City and the first TV border blaster. It held affiliations with all major American networks, though its primary connection was with CBS. It was the only station in the area until 1953; weakened by economic conditions, new stations in the US and the deterioration and destruction of its physical plant, the station was gone by the middle of 1954.

==== Nuevo Laredo ====
- XENT: Operated by Norman G. Baker from 1933 until forced off the air in 1940; "The Calliaphone Station" (for an air-operated calliope invented by Baker) promoted a cancer-cure clinic of Baker's, essentially continuing his former station KTNT ("Know The Naked Truth") of Muscatine, Iowa, as was itself forced off the air in 1931. Brochures for the clinic urged patients to "phone 666 upon arrival in Laredo," attracting many complaints to the American Medical Association as invoked reference to Revelation 13:18, citing 666 as the Mark of the Beast. When the original XENT was dismantled, the callsign was assigned to a new and unrelated station at La Paz, Baja California Sur.

==== Reynosa ====
- XED-AM: The first radio station in Mexico to be considered a border-blaster. XED was originally located at Reynosa, Tamaulipas, and was under the advertising sales management of the International Broadcasting Company. Located across the Rio Grande from McAllen, Texas, the station broadcast with a power of 10 kilowatts that was the most powerful transmitter in Mexico at that time.
- XEAW-AM: Another station that came under the management control of John R. Brinkley. (See XER and XERA.)

==== Tampico ====
- XEFW-AM

== See also ==
- Atlantic 252
- City of license
- Clandestine radio
- List of international radio broadcasters
- List of international television broadcasters
- List of international religious radio broadcasters
- LM Radio
- MW DX
- Pirate radio
- Rimshot
- Signal overspill
