= D-Rok =

British hard rock band

- Cover to the D-Rok album "Oblivion"

Background information
- Genres: Hard rock
- Years active: 1990–1993
- Labels: Warhammer
- Past members: Sigh (Vocals), John Mac (Bass), Al Mogg (Drums), Chi (Guitar)

D-Rok was a British hard rock band notable for its Warhammer 40,000-influenced lyrics.

At the beginning of the 1990s, Games Workshop began to diversify its activity, including combining its game world with music. As well as collaborating with death metal band Bolt Thrower, whose Warhammer 40,000-themed album Realm of Chaos was released on Earache Records, Games Workshop set up their own label, Warhammer Records, signing hard-rock acts such as Wraith and Batfish, who changed their name to Crash & Burn while recording their debut album, then again to D-Rok prior to the album's release.

In 1991 the band released its only album, Oblivion. The songs have the common theme of the universe in Warhammer 40,000 and the inlay reflected this by including black and white illustrations from Games Workshop's extensive portfolio of paintings next to the lyrics for each song. The cover, which originally appeared as the box art for the original Epic Space Marine tabletop game, was painted by artist Jim Burns, and has subsequently been used on the cover of the Black Library collection of short stories named Let the Galaxy Burn.

The band undertook a lengthy club tour to promote the record and secured a support slot with UFO and Wraith.

== Members ==
The CD inlay of Oblivion names the members simply as:

- Sigh - Vocals
- John Mac Morris (credited as John Mac)- Bass
- Al Mogg - Drums
- Chi - Guitar

"Sigh" is actually a pseudonym for Simon Denbigh, formerly of The March Violets

== Brian May ==
D-Rok owes some popularity to the fact that Brian May, guitarist of Queen played on the single "Get out of My Way". In an interview with Kerrang! magazine, lead singer Sigh explained that May had visited a Games Workshop store with his son, met the band, and offered his services. Sigh went on to say that May had been offended when he was asked to tune up his guitar before recording his parts.

== Discography ==
- 1991 - Oblivion - Vinyl, Cassette and CD releases

Track listing

1. Noise Marines
2. King Hibited
3. Renegade
4. Turn This Ship Around
5. Litany - Into The Void*
6. Stealer's Kiss*
7. Oblivion
8. Red Planet Blues
9. Welcome To My World
10. Chainsaw Man*
11. Get Out Of My Way

(* Early releases of the cassette version were missing these songs)
