= Goat gland (filmmaking) =

Silent film with added talkie sequences

Goat gland is a modern term applied to part-talkies which were produced c. 1927–1929, during the period of transition from silent films to sound films. It refers to an already completed silent film to which one or more talkie sequences were added in an effort to make the otherwise outdated film more suitable for release in the radically altered market conditions. The name was derived by analogy from the treatment devised by John R. Brinkley as an alleged cure for impotence.

The term was in use during the sound to silent transition period. In his case for "The Talkies" for Scribner's in 1929, "The Screen Speaks", director William DeMille notes "A 'goat gland,' be it known, is a picture created as a silent film, into which is forcibly, and sometimes painfully, injected one or two "talking sequences" to give the poor thing strength enough to face a world howling for pictures which are audible in some way or other."
