= Brinkley Act =

Clause of the Communications Act of 1934

The Brinkley Act is the popular name given to 47 U.S.C. § 325(c) (originally section 325(b) of the Communications Act of 1934). This provision was enacted by the United States Congress to prohibit broadcasting studios in the U.S. from being connected by live telephone line or other means to a transmitter located in Mexico.

Prior to World War II, Dr. John R. Brinkley controlled a high-power radio station, XERA, located in Ciudad Acuña, Coahuila (Acuna City), on the U.S.-Mexican border, across the Rio Grande from Del Rio, Texas. The programs on Brinkley's stations originated from studios in the US, which were connected to his transmitters via international telephone lines. Brinkley ran a popular but controversial program offering questionable medical advice to his listeners. Since Brinkley's transmitters were licensed in Mexico, which at the time had very limited regulation of broadcast content, his broadcasting licenses could not be directly threatened by the US government.

Dr. Brinkley's activities at his studio were thought to be a local matter, outside Congress's regulatory powers. However, the communications between the studio and his transmitters clearly involved international commerce and were therefore within Congress's power to regulate under the Commerce Clause. The operative language is as follows:

No person shall be permitted to locate, use, or maintain a radio broadcast studio or other place or apparatus from which or whereby sound waves are converted into electrical energy, or mechanical or physical reproduction of sound waves produced, and caused to be transmitted or delivered to a radio station in a foreign country for the purpose of being broadcast from any radio station there having a power output of sufficient intensity and/or being so located geographically that its emissions may be received consistently in the United States, without first obtaining a permit from the Commission upon proper application therefor.

The law goes on (47 U.S.C. § 325(d)) to state that the legal process for requesting such a permit is the same as that for requesting or renewing a license for a domestic station.

Although the original purpose of the Brinkley Act was to shut down XERA, subsequent Mexican-licensed stations have successfully used its provisions to carry American-originated programming. Most notably, Tijuana-based XETV was the San Diego-market affiliate of ABC starting in 1956 – adding live network programming after receiving a Section 325 permit several months later – but lost the affiliation in 1973 after new station KCST successfully sued to deny a renewal. It later affiliated with Fox upon that network's founding in 1986, again receiving Section 325 approval to carry live programming starting in 1994.

Today, especially after language requiring the FCC to consider whether it was "possible or desirable" for an American-licensed station to carry the requested programming was removed by the 1994 North American Free Trade Agreement, such permits are granted as a matter of course. A number of US broadcasters are permitted to program Mexican stations from their US studios in communities such as San Diego and Brownsville, Texas, where as many as a third of the stations in each radio market are licensed in Mexico. In recent years the law has returned to prominence, as its provisions have been used to extend US ownership limits to Mexican stations leased by US broadcasters.

== Comparable legislation elsewhere ==
To prevent Radio Luxembourg from beaming a live signal which had originated in the London studios of the station to the whole of the United Kingdom from continental Europe, the British General Post Office, which had control of British telephones, enacted similar regulations to the Brinkley Act. Consequently, Radio Luxembourg, like Mexican border-blasters, had to either use studios at the station in Luxembourg, or record information in London on a transcription disc which could then be flown to Luxembourg for replay.
