= La Ciudad (archaeological site) =

Former Hohokam people archaeological site in Arizona

La Ciudad is a Hohokam people archaeological site in Phoenix, Arizona, excavated by Frank Midvale 1929–1936. It is covered today by St. Luke's Medical Center. Much of the archaeological material in the Heards' collection at the Heard Museum came from the La Ciudad Indian ruin, which the Heards purchased in 1926 at 19th and Polk streets.

== See also ==
- Mesa Grande
- Hohokam Pima National Monument, in Coolidge, Arizona, which contains artifacts from Snaketown
- Casa Grande Ruins National Monument, with Hohokam structures of the Pueblo III and Pueblo IV Eras
- Indian Mesa Ruins
- Pueblo Grande Ruin and Irrigation Sites
- Lake Pleasant Regional Park
