= John R. Brinkley =

American quack and radio pioneer (1885–1942)

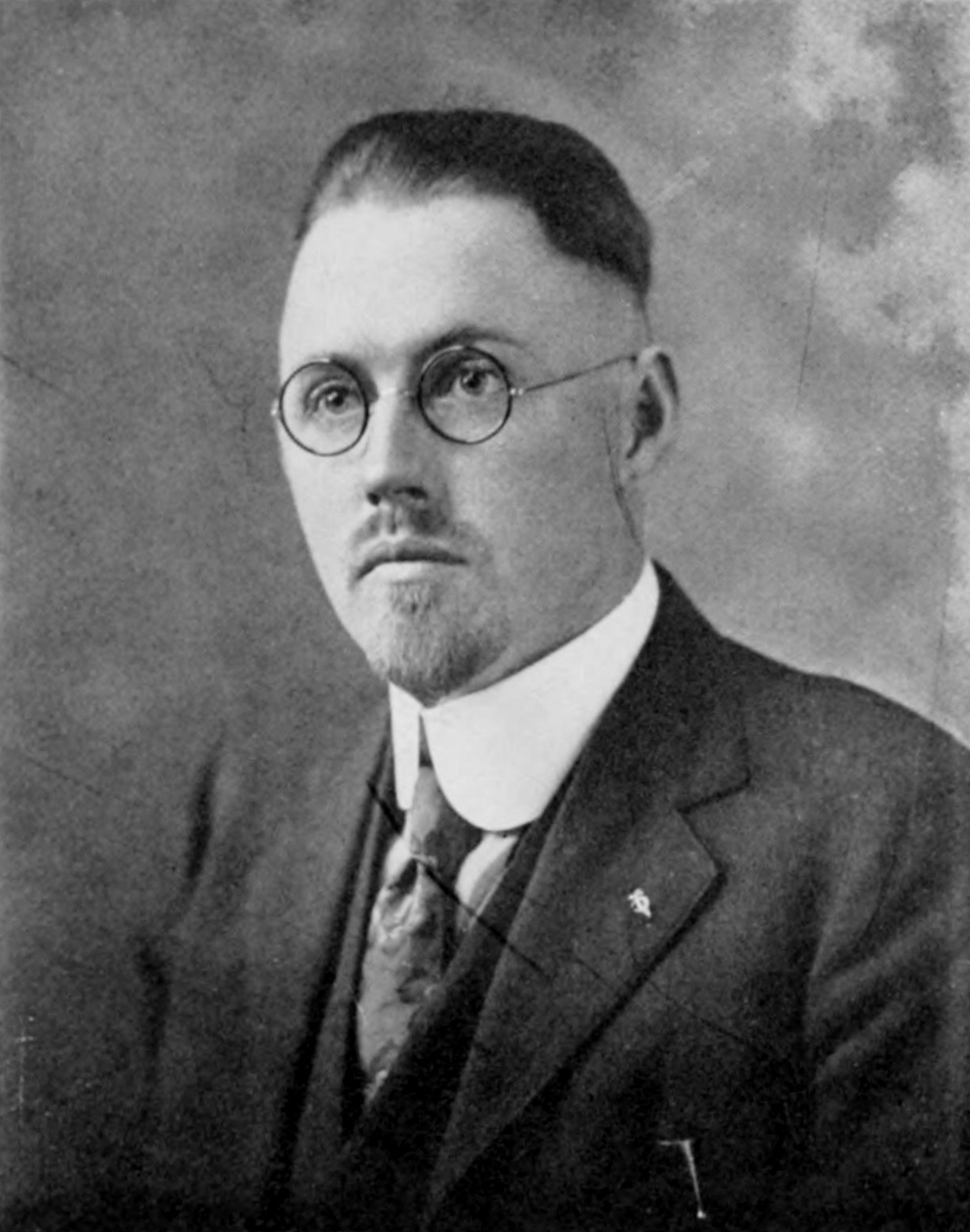
- Brinkley, c. 1921
- Born: John Romulus Brinkley; July 8, 1885; Beta, Jackson County, North Carolina, U.S.
- Died: May 26, 1942 (aged 56); San Antonio, Texas, U.S.
- Resting place: Forest Hill Cemetery; Memphis, Tennessee, U.S.
- Occupations: radio pioneer, charlatan
- Known for: goat gland xenotransplantation
- Political party: Independent
- Spouse(s): Sally Wike (1907–1916); Minerva Telitha "Minnie" Jones (1913–1942)

John Romulus Brinkley (later John Richard Brinkley; July 8, 1885 – May 26, 1942) was an American quack doctor, broadcaster, marketer and independent politician. He had no accredited education as a physician and bought his medical degree from a diploma mill. Brinkley became known as the "goat-gland doctor" after he achieved national fame, international notoriety, and wealth through the xenotransplantation of goat testicles into humans. Although Brinkley initially promoted this procedure as a means of curing male impotence, he later claimed that the technique was a virtual panacea for a wide range of male ailments. Brinkley operated clinics and hospitals in several states and was able to continue practicing medicine for almost two decades, despite his techniques being thoroughly discredited by the broader medical community.

He was also an advertising and radio pioneer who began the era of Mexican border blaster radio.

Although he was stripped of his license to practice medicine in Kansas and several other states, Brinkley, a demagogue beloved by hundreds of thousands of people in Kansas and elsewhere, nevertheless launched three campaigns for Kansas governor, two of which were nearly successful. Brinkley's rise to fame and fortune was as quick as his eventual fall was precipitous. At the height of his career, he had amassed millions of dollars, but he died nearly penniless as a result of the large number of malpractice, wrongful death, and fraud suits brought against him.

== Early life ==
Brinkley was born to John Richard Brinkley, a poor mountain man who practiced medicine in North Carolina and served as a medic for the Confederate States Army during the American Civil War. Brinkley senior's first marriage was annulled because he was underage. After he reached adulthood, he married four more times and outlived each of his wives. In 1870, at the age of 42, he married Sarah T. Mingus. Later, the 24-year-old niece of Mingus, Sarah Candice Burnett, moved into the house. The family called Brinkley's wife "Sally" to differentiate between the two Sarahs. Sarah Burnett gave birth out of wedlock to John Romulus Brinkley in the town of Beta, in Jackson County, North Carolina, naming her son after his father, and after Romulus, the mythical twin suckled by wolves. Sarah Burnett died of pneumonia and tuberculosis when Brinkley was five. Sarah T. "Aunt Sally" and John Brinkley moved with Sarah Burnett's child to East LaPorte within the same county, near the Tuckasegee River. The family had little money during this time.

John Richard Brinkley died when his son was ten years old. The young Brinkley attended a one-room log cabin school in the Tuckasegee area, held each year during three or four months of winter. There, Brinkley met Sally Margaret Wike, the daughter of a well-off school board member. Brinkley finished his studies at 16 and began to work carrying mail between local towns, and to learn how to use a telegraph. He wished, however, to become a doctor.

== Family and education ==
As a telegrapher, Brinkley went to New York City to work for Western Union, after which he moved to New Jersey to work at one, then another, railway company. In late 1906, he returned home to Aunt Sally after hearing that she was unwell. She died on December 25, 1906. Afterward, he was comforted by Sally Wike, age 22 and one year older than Brinkley. They married on January 27, 1907, in Sylva, North Carolina. They traveled around posing as Quaker doctors, giving rural towns a medicine show where they hawked a patent medicine. Brinkley's next move was to Knoxville, Tennessee, where he played right-hand man, helping hawk virility "tonics" with a man named Dr. Burke.

In 1907, Brinkley settled with his wife in Chicago, where they celebrated the birth of their daughter Wanda Marion Brinkley on November 5. John Brinkley then enrolled at Bennett Medical College, an unaccredited school with curricula focused on eclectic medicine. Brinkley worked for Western Union as a telegrapher at night and attended classes during the day, while debts mounted from tuition, the cost of raising a family, and from Sally's self-centered whims. In 1908, the Brinkleys buried an infant son who had lived only three days.

At school, Brinkley was introduced to the study of glandular extracts and their effects on the human system. He determined that this new field would help move his career forward. After two years of studies, and ever-deeper debts, Brinkley doubled his summer workload by taking two shifts at Western Union, but came home one day to find his wife and daughter gone. Sally filed for divorce and child support, but after two months of payments, Brinkley kidnapped his daughter and fled with her to Canada. Sally Brinkley, unable to obtain an extradition order from Canada, dismissed her suit for alimony and child support, allowing Brinkley to return to Chicago with the child where the couple reunited in marriage.

In 1911, before Brinkley was finished with his third year of studies, Sally left him again, and bore him another daughter, Erna Maxine Brinkley, on July 11, 1911, back home in the Tuckasegee area. Brinkley left Chicago and his unpaid tuition bills to return to North Carolina and join his family. There, he began working as an "undergraduate physician", but failed to establish himself. He moved his family around to different towns in Florida and North Carolina, "packing up and going all the time from one place to another".

=== Diploma mill ===
In 1912, Brinkley left his family to try to regain the thread of his education, this time in St. Louis, Missouri. He was unable to pay Bennett Medical College the tuition he owed them, so they refused to forward his scholastic records to any of the medical schools that Brinkley had approached. Instead, Brinkley bought a certificate from a diploma mill known as the Kansas City Eclectic Medical University and returned home. On February 11, 1913, his daughter Naomi Beryl Brinkley was born. The family of five immediately moved to New York City, and shortly thereafter to Chicago. When Brinkley refused to give up his goal of becoming a doctor, Sally Brinkley left him one final time, taking the three girls home to North Carolina.

Brinkley set up a storefront business in Greenville, South Carolina, with a man named James E. Crawford (using the alias J. W. Burks). The two opened their shop as the "Greenville Electro Medic Doctors", and placed advertisements to attract men who were concerned about their manly vigor. They injected colored water into their patients at $25 a shot (equivalent to $900 in 2025), telling them it was Salvarsan or "electric medicine from Germany". After two months, the partners hurriedly left town with unpaid rent and utility bills, as well as debts for clothing and pharmaceutical supplies. The local newspaper reported that the duo left about 30 to 40 local merchants with unpaid checks. They ended up where Crawford had once lived, in Memphis, Tennessee.

=== Second marriage ===
In Memphis, Brinkley met 21-year-old Minerva Telitha "Minnie" Jones, a friend of Crawford's and the daughter of a local physician. On August 23, 1913, after a four-day courtship, Brinkley and Jones married at the Peabody Hotel, even though he was still married to Sally Brinkley. Minnie and John Brinkley honeymooned in Kansas City, Denver, Pocatello and Knoxville. Brinkley was arrested in Knoxville and extradited to Greenville where he was put in jail for practicing medicine without a license and for writing bad checks. Brinkley told the sheriff that it was all Crawford's fault, and gave investigators enough information that they were able to arrest Crawford in Pocatello. The two former partners met again in jail. Brinkley and Minerva had a son, John, who would commit suicide in the 1970s.

Brinkley and Crawford decided to settle out of court with Greenville's angry merchants for a sum of several thousand dollars, most of which Crawford paid. Brinkley's new father-in-law paid Brinkley's bail, but only contributed $200 to his fraudulent debt settlement (equivalent to $6,900 in 2025). Brinkley rejoined Minnie Brinkley in Memphis. There, Sally Brinkley confronted the couple, informing Minnie Brinkley that her husband was a bigamist. Minnie and John Brinkley moved to Judsonia, Arkansas, where he again obtained an "undergraduate license" to practice medicine, advertising his specialty as "diseases of women and children". He made little profit, and joined the Army Reserve Medical Corps.

Brinkley accepted an offer to take over the office of another doctor who was moving out of state. Brinkley began to turn a modest profit, and was finally able to pay Bennett Medical University the amount owed for tuition. In October 1914, the Brinkleys moved to Kansas City where he enrolled at that city's Eclectic Medical University to finish out his last year remaining of the education he started at Bennett. After studying the irritations and enlargements of the prostate gland in elderly men, and paying the university $100 (equivalent to $3,200 in 2025), Brinkley graduated on May 7, 1915. His diploma from Eclectic allowed him to practice medicine in eight states. While in Kansas City, Brinkley took a job as the doctor for the Swift and Company plant, patching minor wounds and studying animal physiology. It was here that Brinkley learned that popular opinion held that the healthiest animal slaughtered at the plant was the goat, something that would prove pivotal to his later medical career.

To resolve the possibility of his bigamy being exposed, Minnie pushed Brinkley to file for divorce from Sally, which he did in December 1915. To prevent the court from inquiring of Sally directly, he wrote that they had been married in New York City, and that he did not know her new place of residence. The divorce was finalized on February 21, 1916. Four days later, Minnie and Brinkley were married again, this time in Liberty, Missouri. Brinkley had not waited the required six months from divorce to subsequent remarriage.

In 1917, Brinkley, now an Army Reservist, was called up for service during World War I. However, he only served a little over two months, most of the duration of which he was sick with a nervous breakdown, before being discharged. In October of the same year, Brinkley and his wife moved to Milford, Kansas, after having spotted a newspaper advertisement saying the town needed a doctor.

== Goat gland transplantation ==
In 1918, Brinkley opened a 16-room clinic in Milford, Kansas, at which time he also started making house calls on patients afflicted with the 1918 Flu Pandemic. Accounts of his success at nursing flu victims back to health and the lengths to which he went to treat them were resoundingly positive.

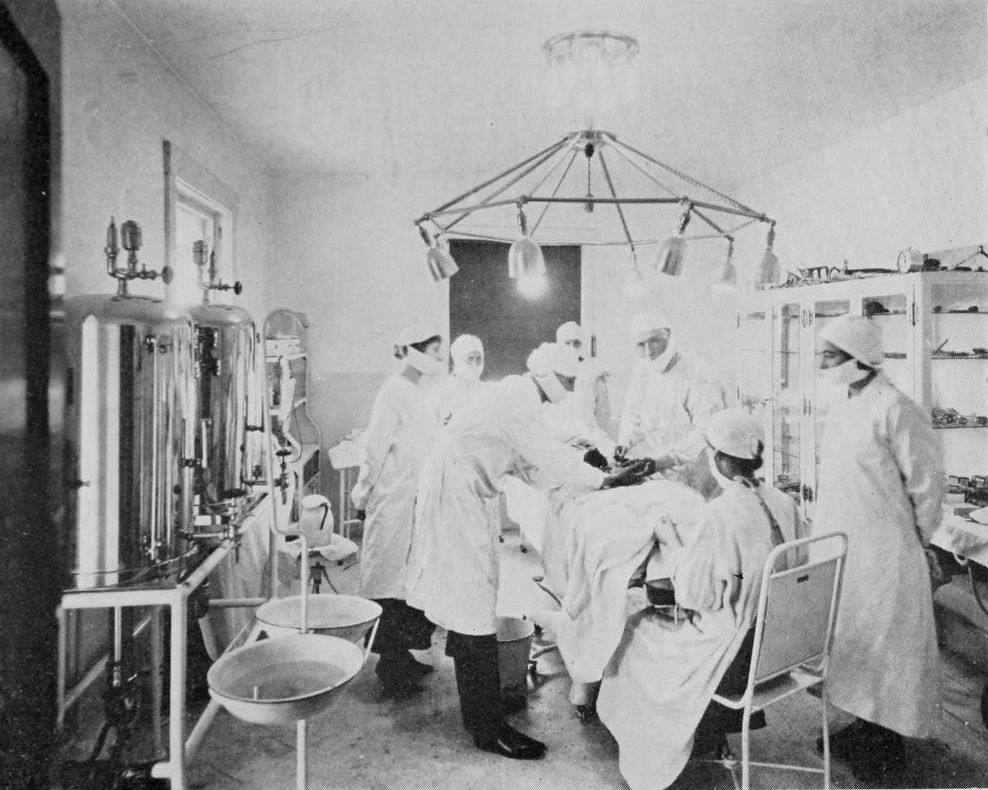
Operating room at the Brinkley Hospital, Milford

As recounted in the biography that Brinkley had commissioned, he struck upon the idea of transplanting goat testicles into men when a patient came to him to ask if he could fix someone who was "sexually weak". Brinkley responded by joking that the patient would have no problem if he had "a pair of those buck [goat] glands in you". The patient then begged Brinkley to try the operation, which Brinkley did, for $150. (The patient's son later told The Kansas City Star that Brinkley had in fact offered to pay his father "handsomely" if he'd go along with the experiment.)

At his clinic, Brinkley began to perform more operations he claimed would restore male virility and fertility through implanting the testicular glands of goats in his male patients at a cost of $750 per operation (equivalent to $12,100 in 2025). Following one of his crude operations, the body of a patient would typically absorb the goat tissue as foreign matter. The goat gonads failed to engraft into the body, as they were simply placed within the human male scrotum or the abdomen of women, near the ovaries.

In light of his questionable medical training (75 percent completion at a less-than-reputable medical school), frequency of operating while intoxicated and less-than-sterile operating environments, some patients suffered from infection, and an undetermined number died. Brinkley would be sued more than a dozen times for wrongful death between 1930 and 1941.

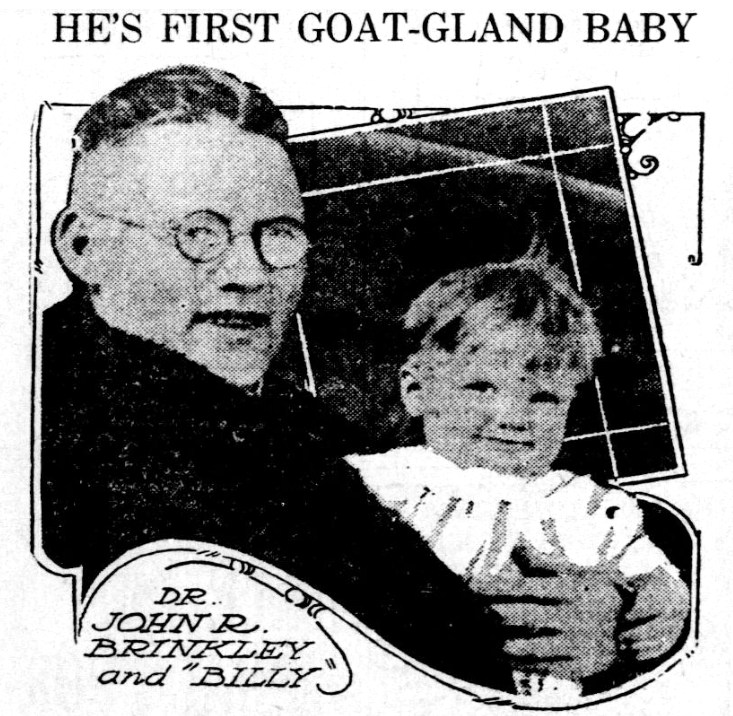
1920 newspaper item highlighting "Billy", the "First Goat-Gland Baby"

Soon after Brinkley opened up shop, he scored an advertising coup that made major newspapers come calling: the wife of his first goat gland transplantation patient gave birth to a baby boy. Brinkley began promoting goat glands as a cure for 27 ailments, ranging from dementia to emphysema to flatulence. He started a direct mail blitz and hired an advertising agent, who helped Brinkley portray his treatments as turning hapless men into "the ram that am with every lamb". His burst of publicity—and his stratospheric claims—attracted the attention of the American Medical Association, which sent an agent to the clinic to investigate undercover. The agent found a woman hobbling around Brinkley's clinic who had been given goat ovaries as a cure for a spinal cord tumor. From then on, Brinkley was on the AMA's radar, including catching the eye of the doctor who would eventually be responsible for his downfall, Morris Fishbein, who made his career exposing medical frauds.

At the same time, other doctors were also experimenting with gland transplantation, including Serge Voronoff, who had become known for grafting monkey testicles into men. In 1920, Voronoff demonstrated his technique before several other doctors at a hospital in Chicago, at which Brinkley showed up uninvited. Though Brinkley was barred at the door, his appearance elevated his profile in the press, which eventually resulted in his own demonstration at a hospital in Chicago. Brinkley transplanted goat testicles into 34 patients, including a judge, an alderman, a society matron and the chancellor of the now-defunct Chicago Law School (not to be confused with the University of Chicago Law School), all while the press looked on. His public profile grew, and his gland business in Milford continued at a brisk pace.

In 1922, Brinkley traveled to Los Angeles at the invitation of Harry Chandler, owner of the Los Angeles Times, who challenged Brinkley to transplant goat testicles into one of his editors. If the operation was a success, Chandler wrote, he would make Brinkley the "most famous surgeon in America", and if not then he should consider himself "damned". California didn't recognize Brinkley's license to practice medicine from the Eclectic Medical University, but Chandler pulled some strings and got him a 30-day permit. The operation was judged a success, and Brinkley received his promised attention in Chandler's paper, which sent many new customers Brinkley's way, including some Hollywood film stars. Brinkley was so taken with the city—and all the money it represented in the form of potential patients—that he began making plans to relocate his clinic there. But his hopes were dashed when the California medical board denied his application for a permanent license to practice medicine, having found his resume "riddled with lies and discrepancies" (most of which were discovered and pointed out to the board by Fishbein). Brinkley returned to Kansas undaunted and began to expand his clinic in Milford.

Brinkley's activities inspired the film industry term 'goat gland'—the grafting of talkie sequences onto silent films to make them marketable.

=== Brinkley's first radio station ===
While in Los Angeles, Brinkley toured KHJ, a radio station Chandler owned. He immediately saw the power radio held as an advertising and marketing medium and resolved to build his own to promote his services, even though at the time advertising on public airwaves was very much discouraged. By 1923, he had enough capital to build KFKB ("Kansas First, Kansas Best" or sometimes "Kansas Folks Know Best") using a 1 kilowatt transmitter. That same year, the St. Louis Star published a scathing expose of medical diploma mills, and in 1924, the Kansas City Journal-Post followed suit, bringing unwelcome attention Brinkley's way. In July 1924, a grand jury in San Francisco handed down 19 indictments to people responsible for conferring fake medical degrees, and for some doctors who received them. Brinkley was one, due mostly to his questionable application for a California medical license. When agents from California came to arrest Brinkley, the governor of Kansas, Jonathan M. Davis, refused to extradite him because he made the state too much money. Brinkley took to his radio station's airwaves to crow about his victory over the American Medical Association and Fishbein, who by this time had started giving speeches and writing articles for the Journal of the American Medical Association (JAMA) deriding Brinkley and his treatments as quackery. His gland business made more money than ever, and had begun attracting patients from around the globe.

Brinkley spoke for hours on end each day on the radio, primarily promoting his goat gland treatments. He variously cajoled, shamed, and appealed to men's (and women's) egos, and to their desire to be more sexually active. In between Brinkley's own advertisements, his new station featured a variety of entertainment including military bands, French lessons, astrological forecasts, storytelling and exotica such as native Hawaiian songs, and American roots music including old-time string band, gospel, and early country.

The advertising boost his radio station gave him was enormous, and Milford benefited as well; Brinkley paid for a new sewage system and sidewalks, installed electricity, built a bandstand and apartments for his patients and employees, as well as a new post office to handle all of his mail. He was named an "admiral" in the Kansas Navy and sponsored a hometown baseball team called the Brinkley Goats.

Eager for better credentials, in 1925 Brinkley traveled to Europe searching for honorary degrees. After being rebuffed by several institutes in the United Kingdom, Brinkley found a willing suitor in the University of Pavia in Italy. Fishbein and Brinkley's former teacher, Max Thorek, heard about the degree and pressured the Italian government to rescind it. Benito Mussolini himself revoked the degree, though Brinkley claimed it until he died. Fishbein's interest in putting Brinkley out of business grew and he wrote more articles featuring stories about people who had grown sick or died after seeing Brinkley. But JAMA's readership was mostly restricted to doctors, while Brinkley's radio station poured directly into peoples' homes every day.

Minnie Brinkley holding John Richard Brinkley III

After his birth on September 3, 1927, the tiny voice of Brinkley's son John Richard Brinkley III, nicknamed "Johnny Boy", was heard on the radio program. Aware of the baby's arrival after 14 years of marriage, some observers wondered if Brinkley had taken his own goat gland treatment. The Brinkleys denied such rumors.

=== Medical Question Box ===
Brinkley began claiming his goat glands could also help male prostate problems, and expanded his business again. He also started a new radio segment called "Medical Question Box", where he would read listeners' medical complaints over the air and suggest proprietary treatments. These treatments were only available at a network of pharmacies that were members of the "Brinkley Pharmaceutical Association". These affiliated pharmacies sold Brinkley's over-the-counter medicines at highly inflated prices, sent a portion of their profit back to Brinkley and kept the rest. It is estimated that this generated $14,000 in profit weekly for Brinkley (equivalent to $14,030,700 in 2025 per year). Reports of patients who took Brinkley's suggested treatments showing up sick at another doctor's office began to grow, and eventually Merck & Co. pharmaceuticals, whose medicines Brinkley routinely misprescribed, requested Fishbein take action; the AMA responded that they had no power over Brinkley, save to try to inform the public.

The Kansas City Star, which owned a radio station that competed with Brinkley's, ran an unfavorable series of reports on him. By 1930, when the Kansas Medical Board held a formal hearing to decide whether Brinkley's medical license should be revoked, Brinkley had signed death certificates for 42 people, many of whom were not sick when they showed up at his clinic. It is unclear how many more of Brinkley's patients may have become ill or later died elsewhere. The medical board revoked his license, stating that Brinkley "has performed an organized charlatanism ... quite beyond the invention of the humble mountebank".

Six months after losing his medical license, the Federal Radio Commission refused to renew his station's broadcasting license, finding that Brinkley's broadcasts were mostly advertising, which violated international treaties, that he broadcast obscene material, and that his Medical Question Box series was "contrary to the public interest". He sued the commission, but the courts upheld the revocation and the case KFKB Broadcasting Association v. Federal Radio Commission became a landmark case in broadcast law.

== Political career ==
Brinkley reacted to losing his medical and broadcast licenses by launching a bid to become the Governor of Kansas, a political position that would enable him to appoint his own members to the medical board and thus regain his right to practice medicine in the state. He kicked off his candidacy just three days after he lost his medical license, using his radio station to help his campaign. At his side was KFKB's biggest country-music star, Roy Faulkner, who took to the stage with guitar and hat in hand. A populist, Brinkley campaigned on a vague program of public works (a state lake in every county), education (free textbooks for public schoolchildren and increased educational opportunities for blacks), lower taxes, and old-age pensions. He appealed to the immigrant vote by putting German and Swedish-speaking people on the air at KFKB. Brinkley enlisted a pilot with his own plane (Brinkley dubbed it The Romancer) to deliver him in grand style at his campaign rallies. In short, Brinkley was a master of the publicity stunt; when a prominent newspaper reporter ran an article critical of his qualifications to run a state, Brinkley sent him a goat.

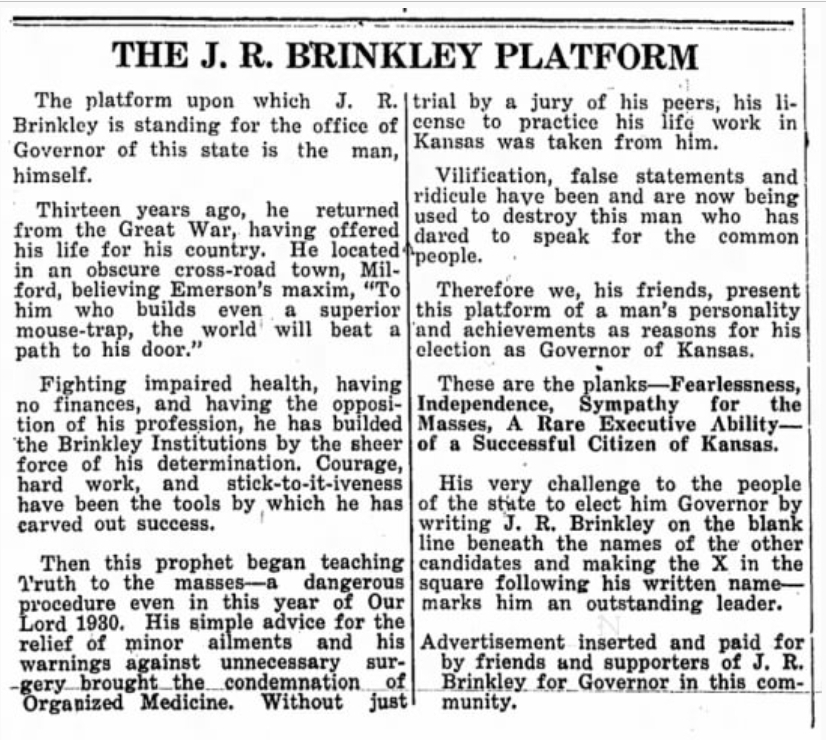
1930 gubernatorial campaign advertisement, published in the Belleville Telescope. Touting Brinkley's military service during World War I and decrying the loss of his medical license, it instructs voters explicitly how to vote for the write-in candidate.

His campaign was conducted as an independent write-in candidate, because he waited to declare his candidacy until September, after the ballots had already been printed. Three days before the election, the Kansas attorney general (who had prosecuted Brinkley before the medical board) announced that the rules surrounding write-in candidates had changed, and that the doctor's name could only be written in one specific way for the vote to count (as J. R. Brinkley). As a write-in candidate, he received more than 180,000 votes (29.5 percent of the vote) and lost to Harry Hines Woodring, later Secretary of War in the cabinet of President Franklin D. Roosevelt. An article published at the time in The Des Moines Register estimated that between 30,000 and 50,000 ballots were disqualified in this manner. Woodring later admitted that had those votes counted, Brinkley would have won.

Brinkley ran again in 1932 as an independent, receiving 244,607 votes (30.6 percent of the vote), losing to Republican Alf Landon, later Republican nominee for president in 1936.

His prospects for success in Kansas destroyed, Brinkley sold KFKB to an insurance company and decided to move closer to the Mexican border, where he could operate a high-power radio station with impunity. Though he could no longer practice medicine in Kansas, he kept his Milford clinic open and put two of his protégés in charge. Wooed by the prospect of being a big fish in a very small pond, Brinkley relocated to Del Rio, Texas, which lay just across a bridge from Mexico.

Brinkley became a Nazi sympathizer later in the 1930s. He donated $629 to the Silver Legion of America in 1939.

== Brinkley and radio ==
The Mexican government, eager to get even with its northern neighbors for dividing up North America's radio frequencies without giving any to Mexico, granted Brinkley a 50,000-watt radio license and construction began on XER, his new "border blaster" across the bridge from Del Rio in Villa Acuña, Coahuila (since renamed Ciudad Acuña). Brinkley achieved this with the help of Esther O. Crosby, owner of Mrs Crosby's Cafe in Acuña. As construction got underway, Fishbein and the U.S. State Department desperately searched for a way to shut Brinkley down. Under heavy pressure from the State Department, the Mexican government halted construction on XER, but it was only temporary. Within weeks, construction resumed and soon two 300-foot (91 m) towers reached into the sky. XER, at 840 kilohertz on the AM dial, radiated at night by a sky wave antenna, made its first broadcast in October 1931. Brinkley called it the "Sunshine Station Between the Nations".

Brinkley used his new border blaster to resume his campaign for governor by using the telephone to call in his broadcasts to the transmitter. This approach did not work, and he lost yet another political campaign; he would lose again in 1934. Though Brinkley's American radio license had been revoked, XER's signal was so strong that it could still be heard in Kansas. In 1932, the Mexican government allowed Brinkley to increase his wattage to 150,000 watts. Several months later, Brinkley was allowed to increase to one million watts, "making XER far and away the most powerful radio station on the planet" that, on a clear night, could be heard as far away as Canada. According to accounts of the time, the signal was so strong that it turned on car headlights, made bedsprings hum, and caused broadcasts to bleed into telephone conversations. Local residents claimed to not need a radio to hear Brinkley's station; with ranchers claiming that they received it through their metal fences and in their dental appliances.

Brinkley continued his old radio format of medical advice keyed to advertising products. Male listeners were offered an array of expensive concoctions which included Mercurochrome injections and pills, all designed to help them regain their sexual prowess. At the clinic in the hotel where he lived, he also performed prostate operations. He also began selling airtime to other advertisers (at $1,700 an hour, equivalent to $32,800 in 2025), giving rise to new hucksters shilling products such as "Crazy Water Crystals", "genuine simulated" diamonds, life insurance, and an array of religious paraphernalia, including what was purported to be autographed pictures of Jesus Christ. Brinkley also continued packing his radio lineup with up-and-coming country and roots singers whose careers his radio station helped launch (including Patsy Montana, Red Foley, Gene Autry, Jimmie Rodgers, the Carter Family, the Pickard Family, and others). Del Rio became known as "Hillbilly Hollywood".

When the FRC banned what they called "spooks" (mind readers, fortune-tellers and other mystics) from broadcasting on U.S. radio in 1932, many of them followed Brinkley's model, opening their own border blasters in Mexico. By 1932, 11 such stations had opened, including XENT, XERB, XELO, XEG and XEPN.

Brinkley was still shuttling back and forth from Milford to Del Rio, often broadcasting from XER over the telephone. In 1932, Congress passed a law prohibiting studios in the United States from being connected to transmitters in Mexico by telephone, known as the Brinkley Act. Unfazed, Brinkley began using some of the first "electrical transcriptions"—what today would be called pre-recordings—to circumvent the law. Around this time, Brinkley decided to sever the rest of his ties to Kansas, closing down his hospital there and opening a new one in Del Rio, which took up three floors of the Roswell Hotel, where he lived with his wife.

In 1934, Mexico revoked Brinkley's broadcast license, the result of pressure from the United States. Soldiers from the Mexican army arrived at the station's doorstep to shut him down, and for a time he had to broadcast from nearby XEPN, located in Piedras Negras, Coahuila.

Though Brinkley continued to perform the occasional goat gland transplant, in Texas his practice shifted mostly to performing slightly modified vasectomies and prostate "rejuvenations" for which he charged up to $1,000 per operation (equivalent to $23,500 in 2025), and prescribed his own proprietary medicine for after-care. His business, fueled by radio advertisements and speeches, continued to thrive, and he opened another clinic in San Juan, Texas, specializing in the colon. By 1936, Brinkley had amassed enough wealth to build a mansion for himself and his wife on 16 acres (6.5 ha) of land. Brinkley boasted a stable of a dozen Cadillacs, a greenhouse, a foaming fountain garden surrounded by 8,000 bushes, exotic animals imported from the Galapagos Islands, and a swimming pool with a 10-foot (3.0 m) diving tower. Brinkley continued living high in Del Rio, until in 1938 a rival doctor began cutting into Brinkley's business by offering similar procedures much more cheaply. When Del Rio's city elders refused to put the competitor out of business, Brinkley closed up shop and reopened in downtown Little Rock, Arkansas, with another hospital at what is now Marylake Monastery. His competition from Del Rio opened a new cancer center in Eureka Springs, Arkansas, about 150 miles (240 km) northwest of Little Rock.

== Trial and death ==
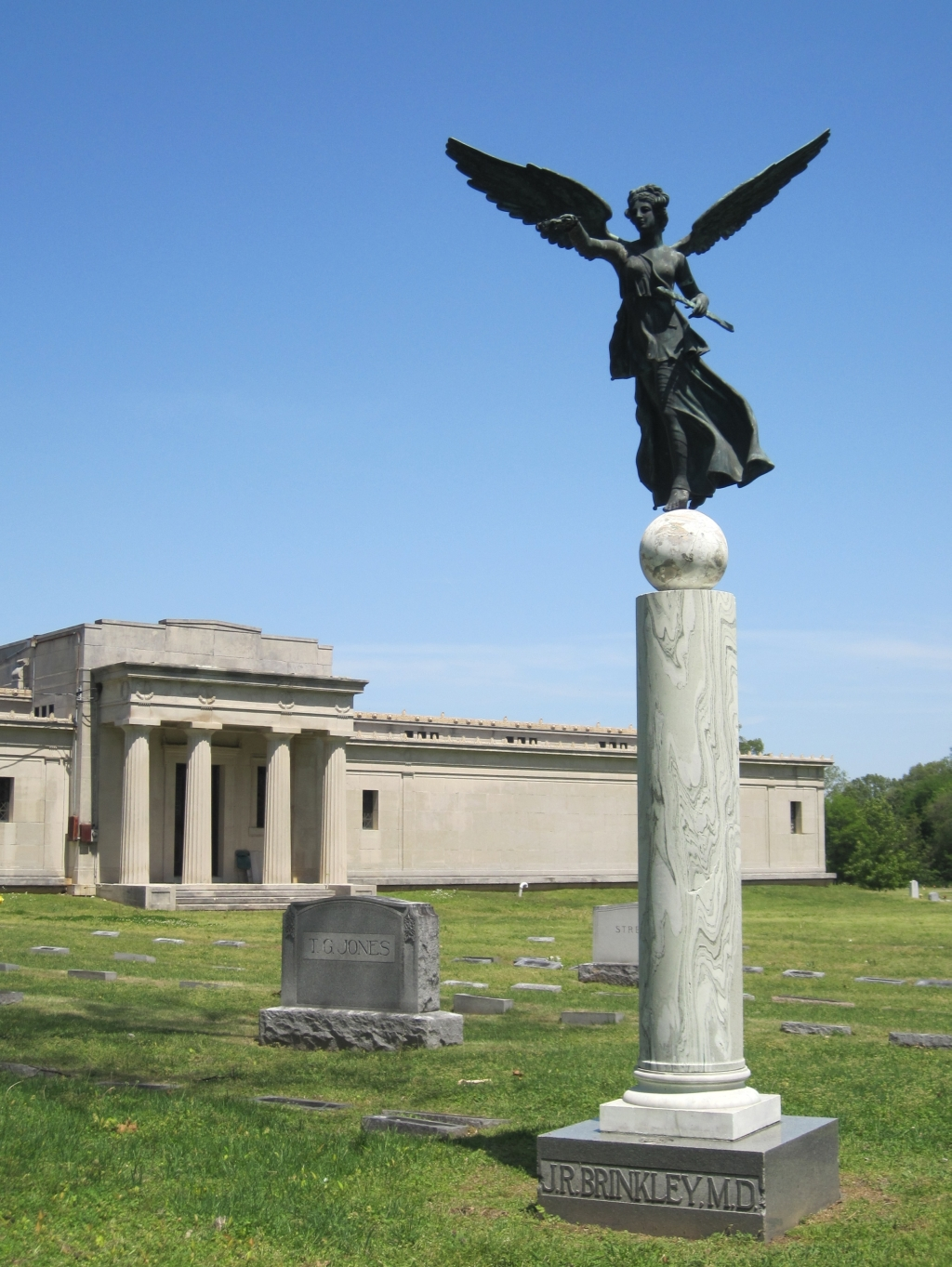
Grave of John R. Brinkley in 2011

In 1938, Brinkley's old nemesis, Morris Fishbein, entered the picture again with a vengeance, publishing a two-part series called "Modern Medical Charlatans" that included a thorough repudiation of Brinkley's checkered career, as well as exposing his questionable medical credentials. Brinkley sued Fishbein for libel and $250,000 in damages (equivalent to $5,720,000 in 2025). The trial began on March 22, 1939, before Texas judge Robert J. McMilllan. A few days later, the jury found for Fishbein, stating that Brinkley "should be considered a charlatan and a quack in the ordinary, well-understood meaning of those words". The jury verdict unleashed a barrage of lawsuits against Brinkley, by some estimates well over $3 million in total value. Also around this time, the Internal Revenue Service began investigating him for tax fraud. He declared bankruptcy in 1941, the same year implementation of the North American Regional Broadcasting Agreement provided an avenue for the United States to get Mexico to shut down XERA.

Soon after his bankruptcy, the U.S. Post Office Department began investigating him for mail fraud, and Brinkley became a patient himself, having suffered three heart attacks and the amputation of one of his legs due to poor circulation. On May 26, 1942, Brinkley died penniless of heart failure in San Antonio; the mail fraud case had not yet come to trial. He was later buried at Forest Hill Cemetery in Memphis, Tennessee.

In early 2017, the bronze winged angel atop his grave column was cut off and stolen, in an ongoing spate of similar robberies from Memphis cemeteries.

His house, commonly called the Brinkley Mansion, still stands today at 512 Qualia Drive in Del Rio and has been designated Texas Historic Landmark number 13015.

== Legacy ==
- Brinkley's life and career is the subject of several books written in the 20th and 21st centuries, including works by Clement Wood (1934 or 1936), Gerald Carson (1960), R. Alton Lee (2002), and Pope Brock (2008).
- Buster Keaton's short film Cops (1922) includes a reference to Brinkley's goat gland transplantation: partway through the film, Keaton takes his horse to a "goat gland specialist"; when the horse emerges, it has become faster and more energetic.
- In 2012, Brinkley was featured in episode 1 of season 3 of the Travel Channel series Mysteries at the Museum.
- In 2016, director Penny Lane made Nuts!, a documentary about Brinkley's life that uses animation to illustrate scenes from his life.
- The Reply All podcast episode #86, "Man of the People", is about Brinkley's life.
- In 2017, it was announced that a movie based on the podcast episode, directed and written by Richard Linklater and starring Robert Downey Jr., was in development.
- In 2020, Untitled Theater Company No. 61 released a four-part audio drama podcast by Edward Einhorn and hosted by Dan Butler, entitled The Resistible Rise of J. R. Brinkley
- In 2024, BBC Radio 4 aired a play, written by Graeme Garden, about Brinkley's life titled The Goat Doctor.
- In 2025, Brinkley was featured in series 1, episode 3 of the Sky History series Hazardous History with Henry Winkler.
