= Ciudad Acuña =

City in the Mexican state of Coahuila

- City
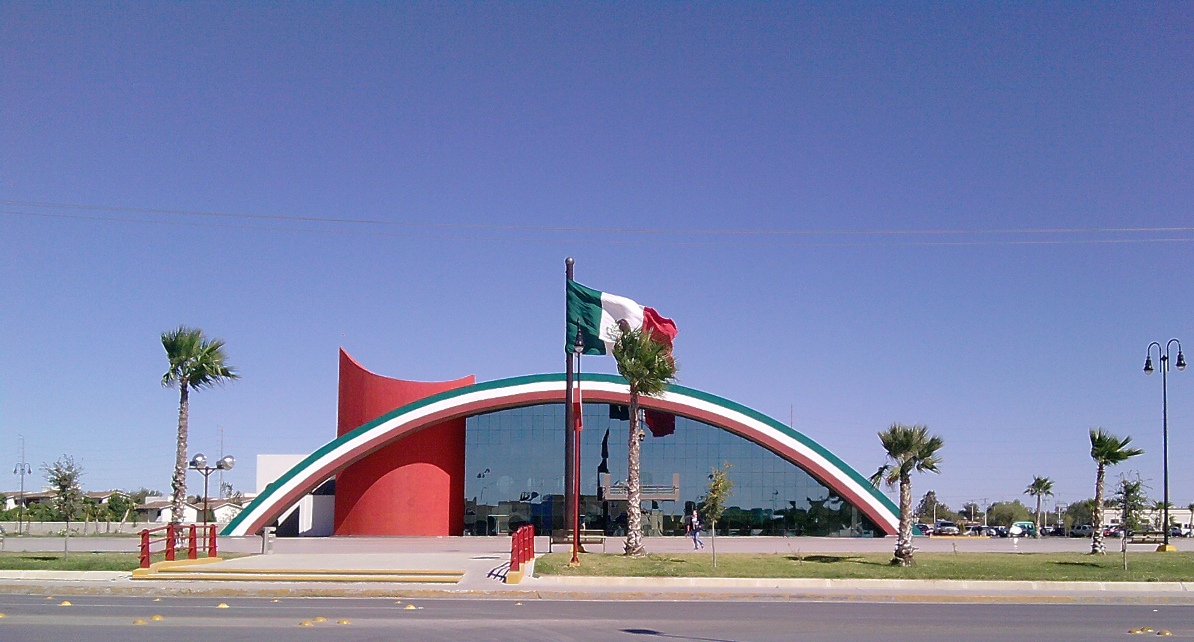
- National flag in Ciudad Acuña

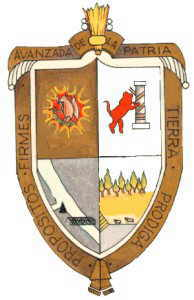
- Seal

- Location within Coahuila Location within Mexico
- Coordinates: 29°19′27″N 100°55′54″W
- Country: Mexico
- State: Coahuila
- Municipality: Acuña
- Settled: 27 December 1877 (148 years ago)
- Town status: 1880 (146 years ago)
- City status: 16 September 1951 (75 years ago)
- Named for: Manuel Acuña
- Elevation: 271 m (889 ft)

Population (2020)
  - Total: 160,225
  - Demonym: Acuñense
- Time zone: UTC−06:00 (Zona Centro)
  - Summer (DST): UTC–05:00 (DST)
- Postal code: 26200–26328
- Area code: +52 877
- Website: www.acuna.gob.mx

Ciudad Acuña (Spanish: Acuña City), commonly referred to simply as Acuña, is a city in the Mexican state of Coahuila. It is located along the Rio Grande, which forms part of the United States–Mexico border, across from Del Rio, Texas, United States.

Ciudad Acuña has two international border crossings: the Lake Amistad Dam International Crossing and the Del Río–Ciudad Acuña International Bridge. It serves as the municipal seat of Acuña Municipality. The area is served by Ciudad Acuña International Airport.

According to 2017 census estimates, the city had a population of 201,778, while the municipality had a population of 214,616. Ciudad Acuña is the fifth-largest city in Coahuila.

== Etymology ==
Ciudad Acuña (Spanish: Acuña City), named after Mexican poet Manuel Acuña, is commonly referred to simply as Acuña. It was originally known as Garza Galán and was later renamed Villa Acuña (Spanish: Acuña Town).

== History ==
The first recorded settlement of Acuña took place on 27 December 1877. It was founded by a group of colonists led by Domingo Urias, Irineo Casillas Arevalo, and his wife Maximina Espinoza. At the same time, the governor of the state was general Hipólito Charles, who posted a military garrison in the area led by Captain Manuel Leal. In 1880, the community received villa (town) status under its first name of Garza Galán. In 1884, the locality was renamed Congregación las Vacas. Congregacion las Vacas was then renamed Villa Acuña in 1912 after Saltillan poet Manuel Acuña. Villa Acuña was finally given the title of city on 16 September 1951 by Don JesusMaria Ramon, when it got its present name of Ciudad Acuña.

On 24 October 1960, US President Dwight D. Eisenhower and Mexican President Adolfo López Mateos met in Acuña to sign the initial agreements allowing construction of the dam. Construction plans were not finalized until December 1966, when Presidents Lyndon B. Johnson and Gustavo Díaz Ordaz met on the international bridge. Presidents Richard M. Nixon and Gustavo Díaz Ordaz met for the dedication of Amistad Dam on 8 September 1969.

Originally created to serve airmen at Laughlin AFB just across the border, "Boys' Town" is an entertainment district located in an area south of Ciudad Acuña and contains a few after-hours bars and brothels, but is designated off-limits to U.S. military personnel.

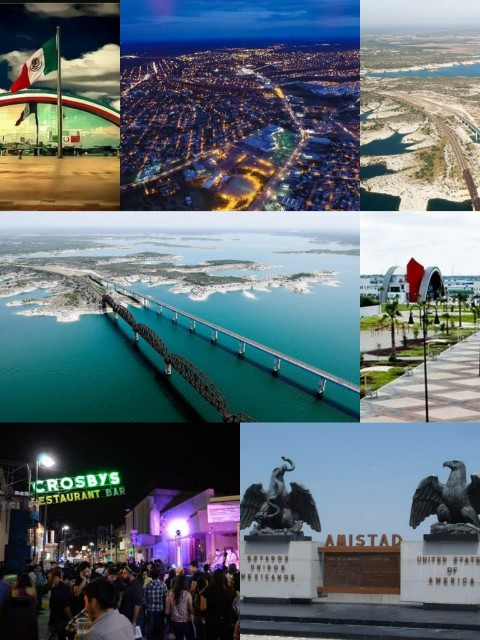
Acuña, Coahuila

On 25 May 2015, an F3 tornado struck the city, causing incredible damage and killing 14 people and injuring 200 more.

== Economy ==
Various foreign companies have opened factories, or maquiladoras in Acuña, given its status as being 100% union-free. These include Irvin Automotive Products (automotive seat components), Howmet de Mexico (aerospace parts), Bendix (brake and hydraulic parts), Gentherm de Mexico (automotive seat heaters), Caterpillar (mining truck components), RESCO Electronics (wiring harness and cable assembly manufacturing), and Toter Incorporated (waste receptacles, curbside roll-out carts).

== Education ==
According to the Secretariat of Public Education, there are 223 schools in the Acuña municipality, of which 13 are starter schools, 64 preschool, 68 primary, 36 lower secondary (junior high school), 30 higher secondary (high school), 7 colleges and 4 vocational schools.

Prior to 2009, many students living in this city used their relatives' addresses who lived in the U.S. to attend schools in the San Felipe Del Rio Consolidated Independent School District, on the U.S. side. Minors were being interrogated at the border without an adult present, which caused much controversy, since that is illegal, and not all students had only one home. Many of their parents worked in the Del Rio side of the border and legally paid taxes. More than 400 students never came back.

== Media ==
=== Radio ===
In the 1930s in Villa Acuña, now Ciudad Acuña, the border blaster XERF-AM made its home. The radio station was built by John R. Brinkley from the U.S. state of Kansas. Brinkley claimed to be able to cure male virility deficiency with goat gland transplants. Brinkley wanted to promote his male enhancement operations and used the radio station for that purpose. Because of the purpose of radio XER and what it promoted, the station was closed in 1939 by the Mexican government.

In 1947, the government of Mexico licensed XER, the 100 kW super-power border blaster run by Ramon D. Bosquez. They used the old XERA facilities and sold its airtime to American evangelists broadcasting in English to the United States. In 1959, Ramon D. Bosquez and Arturo Gonzalez formed the Inter-American Radio Advertising, Inc. in Del Rio. They ran the broadcasting in Del Rio while the license rested in the hands of Mexican officials. They boosted the power to 250 kW.

Since 1987 XERF-AM (called La Poderosa) is under control of the Instituto Mexicano de la Radio. It plays Spanish-language programs, news and music, broadcasting at 1570 kHz. Since 2012, its FM twin station is XHRF-FM, broadcasting at 103.9 kHz with 100,000 watts of transmitting power.

== Population ==
The Del Rio micropolitan area's population was 55,000 people in 2015, and the Ciudad Acuña Metropolitan Area's population was 225,000 people in 2015. The 2015 population of Greater Del Rio-Ciudad Acuña binational metropolitan area is 280,000.

== Cultural references ==
=== In song ===
Acuña is mentioned in "El Coyote" by Texas singer-songwriter Guy Clark off his last studio album "My Favorite Picture of You".

Acuña is mentioned in a song called "Mexican Blackbird" on the ZZ Top album Fandango!.

"Blame It on Mexico", a song performed by George Strait and written by songwriter Darrell Staedtler on the Strait Country album tells about a night in Acuña at Ma Crosby's (a historic restaurant in Acuña) in the beginning.

Acuña is the setting for the Robert Earl Keen song, "A Border Tale".

Steve Earle refers to "Boys' Town" in his song "The Week of Living Dangerously", recorded as Steve Earle and the Dukes, on their Exit 0 album.

"Acuña" is the title of a song recorded by Wade Bowen in October 2017.

=== Cinema and books ===
In the film, Rolling Thunder (1977), the villains are known as the Acuña Boys.

Outdoor scenes for the 1992 cult motion picture El Mariachi were shot in Acuña, as well as the bar scenes and street confrontation from the sequel, Desperado. Actor/producer Carlos Gallardo was born in Ciudad Acuña.

Also, Desperado and Single Action were filmed in Acuña at the Corona Club (cater-corner to Ma Crosby's) located on the main strip (La Hidalgo).

In Kill Bill: Volume 2 the protagonist goes to see Bill's friend Esteban, who runs Acuña through the strength of his Acuña boys, the fatherless sons of the women he pimps. In another Tarantino movie, Grindhouse, Acuña Boys Mexican Food is featured on a bumper ad, as well as a take-out drink container in the first scenes of Death Proof.

The film Like Water for Chocolate was filmed on Lake Amistad in Acuña.

The film Love and a .45 features a standoff between the film's primary protagonists and antagonist in Acuña after the three have crossed the U.S./Mexico border.

Portions of the film No Country For Old Men are set in Acuña.

Scenes in the Western novel Ride Harder (2017) take place in Acuña and the town is mentioned in the series's first book, The Hardest Ride (2013).
