= KTSM =

KTSM may refer to:

- KTSM-TV, a television station (channel 9 virtual/16 digital) licensed to El Paso, Texas, United States
- KTSM (AM), a radio station (690 AM) licensed to El Paso, Texas, United States
- KTSM-FM, a radio station (99.9 FM) licensed to El Paso, Texas, United States
