= KHEY =

KHEY may refer to:

- KHEY (AM), a radio station (1380 AM) licensed to El Paso, Texas, United States
- KHEY-FM, a radio station (96.3 FM) licensed to El Paso, Texas, United States
- Hanchey Army Heliport (ICAO code: KHEY), a heliport serving Fort Rucker, Alabama, United States
