= KROD =

Radio station in El Paso, Texas

Coordinates: 31°54′56.4″N 106°23′34.9″W

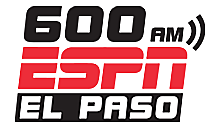
- El Paso, Texas; United States
- Broadcast area: El Paso metropolitan area
- Frequency: 600 kHz
- Branding: Sports 600 ESPN

Programming
- Format: Sports
- Affiliations: ESPN Radio; NFL on Westwood One

Ownership
- Owner: Townsquare Media; (Townsquare Media of El Paso, Inc.)
- Sister stations: KLAQ; KSII

History
- First air date: June 1, 1940
- Former frequencies: 1500 kHz (1941–1948)
- Call sign meaning: Dorance D. Roderick (original owner)

Technical information
- Licensing authority: FCC
- Facility ID: 14908
- Class: B
- Power: 5,000 watts

Links
- Public license information: Public file; LMS
- Webcast: Listen live
- Website: www.krod.com

KROD (600 kHz) is a commercial AM radio station in El Paso, Texas, United States. It airs a sports format and is owned and operated by Townsquare Media. The offices and studios are located on North Mesa Street (Texas State Highway 20) in Northwest El Paso.

KROD broadcasts at 5,000 watts around the clock. At night, when radio waves travel farther, it uses a directional antenna to avoid interfering with other stations on AM 600. It is the West Texas primary entry point station for the Emergency Alert System. The transmitter is located off Dyer Street (U.S. Business Route 54) in far north El Paso.

== Programming ==
The station is a network affiliate of ESPN Radio. KROD breaks from ESPN Radio on weekday afternoon drive time for "KROD Sportstalk with Steve Kaplowitz". The station carries Pacific Coast League baseball games as the flagship station of the El Paso Chihuahuas. It also broadcasts the El Paso Rhinos in the Western States Hockey League, UTEP Miners football, UTEP Miners men's basketball, UTEP Miners women's basketball, the NFL on Westwood One and Texas Longhorns football.

== History ==
=== Early years ===
A construction permit for KROD was issued in 1936, to operate on 1500 kHz, then a local channel, with 100 watts full-time. The station signed on the air on June 1, 1940, as El Paso's second radio station after KTSM, which was established in 1929. The KROD call sign stood for Dorrance D. Roderick, the station's original owner and the publisher of the El Paso Times newspaper. The studios were at 2201 Wyoming Street, now the home of Channel 38 KSCE. KROD was an affiliate affiliate of the CBS Radio Network, carrying its schedule of dramas, comedies, news, sports, soap operas, game shows and big band broadcasts during the "Golden Age of Radio".

A short time after going on the air, KROD increased its power to 250 watts and had a construction permit to move to 600 kHz. The move to AM 600 was coupled with an increase in power to 1,000 watts by day, 500 watts at night. A new four tower array was constructed during 1941. The 600 kHz transmitter was on Dyer Street in Northeast El Paso, where the Sunrise Shopping Center now stands. The transmitter moved to 10420 Dyer in the late 1960s.

=== Adding TV and FM stations ===
By 1950, KROD had increased its power to 5,000 watts full time. An advertisement in the 1953 Broadcasting Yearbook said that KROD had the "greatest coverage of any radio station in El Paso", with the biggest audience, the largest dollar value and unrivaled local programs. In 1952, a television station was added, Channel 4 KROD-TV (now KDBC-TV). Because KROD was a CBS Radio Network affiliate, KROD-TV joined the CBS television network.

As network programming moved from radio to television, KROD began playing music. In 1959, KROD-AM-TV were acquired by Trigg-Vaughn Stations, with Cecil Trigg serving as President. KROD moved to a full service middle of the road (MOR) format of popular music, news and sports. The station used the catch phrase "The Big 600". The station also aired University of Texas at El Paso (UTEP) sports, specifically, NCAA Division I Men's Football and NCAA Division I Men's Basketball, for much of its history. This is depicted by the KROD banners in the movie Glory Road.

In 1967, the stations were sold to Doubleday Broadcasting Co., a subsidiary of publisher Doubleday and Company. In April 1973, Doubleday sold KROD to Desert Horizons, Inc., a subsidiary of publicly-owned group Media Horizons, Inc. In September 1974, Doubleday sold KDBC-TV (formerly KROD-TV) to Portal Communications, Inc., a subsidiary of Evening Post Publishing Co. In 1978, KROD added an FM station, 95.5 KLAQ. While KROD continued its MOR format, KLAQ began by playing progressive rock music, later switching to album rock.

=== Oldies, talk, sports ===
In the 1980s, KROD switched to oldies music. New Wave Communications acquired KROD and KLAQ in 1995, switching AM 600 to a talk and sports format. In 1999, KROD and KLAQ changed hands again, this time to Regent Communications, Inc.

On January 18, 2011, KROD dropped its talk programming, changing to all sports, with programming from ESPN Radio. KROD and KLAQ were also acquired by Townsquare Media.
