= KLAQ =

Radio station in El Paso, Texas

Coordinates: 31.797°N 106.482°W

- El Paso, Texas; United States
- Broadcast area: El Paso metropolitan area; Las Cruces, New Mexico; Ciudad Juárez
- Frequency: 95.5 MHz (HD Radio)
- Branding: 95.5 KLAQ

Programming
- Format: Mainstream rock
- Subchannels: HD2: Classic rock
- Affiliations: Compass Media Networks; Dallas Cowboys Radio Network

Ownership
- Owner: Townsquare Media; (Townsquare Media of El Paso, Inc.)
- Sister stations: KROD; KSII

History
- First air date: September 15, 1978
- Former call signs: KUOE (CP, 1976-78)
- Call sign meaning: El Paso Q

Technical information
- Licensing authority: FCC
- Facility ID: 48670
- Class: C
- ERP: 100,000 watts
- HAAT: 424 meters (1,391 ft)

Links
- Public license information: Public file; LMS
- Webcast: Listen live; HD2: Listen live
- Website: klaq.com

KLAQ (95.5 FM) is a commercial radio station licensed to El Paso, Texas and airing a mainstream rock radio format. The station is owned by Townsquare Media and has studios and offices on North Mesa Street (Texas Route 20) in northwest El Paso.

KLAQ's transmitter is located in the Franklin Mountains, off Scenic Drive in El Paso. The station has an effective radiated power (ERP) of 100,000 watts, the maximum for most FM stations. The signal extends north to Las Cruces, New Mexico, and south through Ciudad Juárez and the Mexican state of Chihuahua.

== Programming ==
KLAQ calls itself "El Paso's Best Rock", and frequently hosts largest events and concerts in El Paso. The station is home to the Buzz Adams Morning Show, which is syndicated to other Texas rock stations. The show is heard weekdays, with a "Best of" show on Saturday mornings. Sunday evenings feature "Q Connected - The New Music Show." KLAQ also carries Dallas Cowboys football.

== History ==
On September 15, 1978, the station first signed on the air. It was owned by Rex Broadcasting, along with KROD (600 AM). When it was still a construction permit issued by the Federal Communications Commission, the unbuilt station used the call sign KUOE. Throughout its on-air history, the station's call letters have always been KLAQ and it has always carried a rock format, originally album rock.

KPAS (93.9 FM, now KINT), owned by the El Paso Broadcasting Corporation, was El Paso's original FM rock station. KLAQ's sign-on put it in competition with KPAS. But with the shift in contemporary music listening from AM radio to the FM band, KPAS switched to a Top 40 format in 1981, making KLAQ the sole rock outlet in El Paso. For a few years in the early 2000s, Mexican radio station XHEPR-FM (99.1 MHz), licensed to Ciudad Juárez, aired an English-language classic rock format that targeted the El Paso radio market.

In 1989, KLAQ and KROD were acquired by D & F Broadcasting. KLAQ joined the ABC Rock Radio Network.

The stations changed hands again in 1997, going to New Wave Broadcasting L.P. In the 2010s, KLAQ was acquired by Townsquare Media, along with KROD.
