= KVIA-TV =

Television station in El Paso, Texas

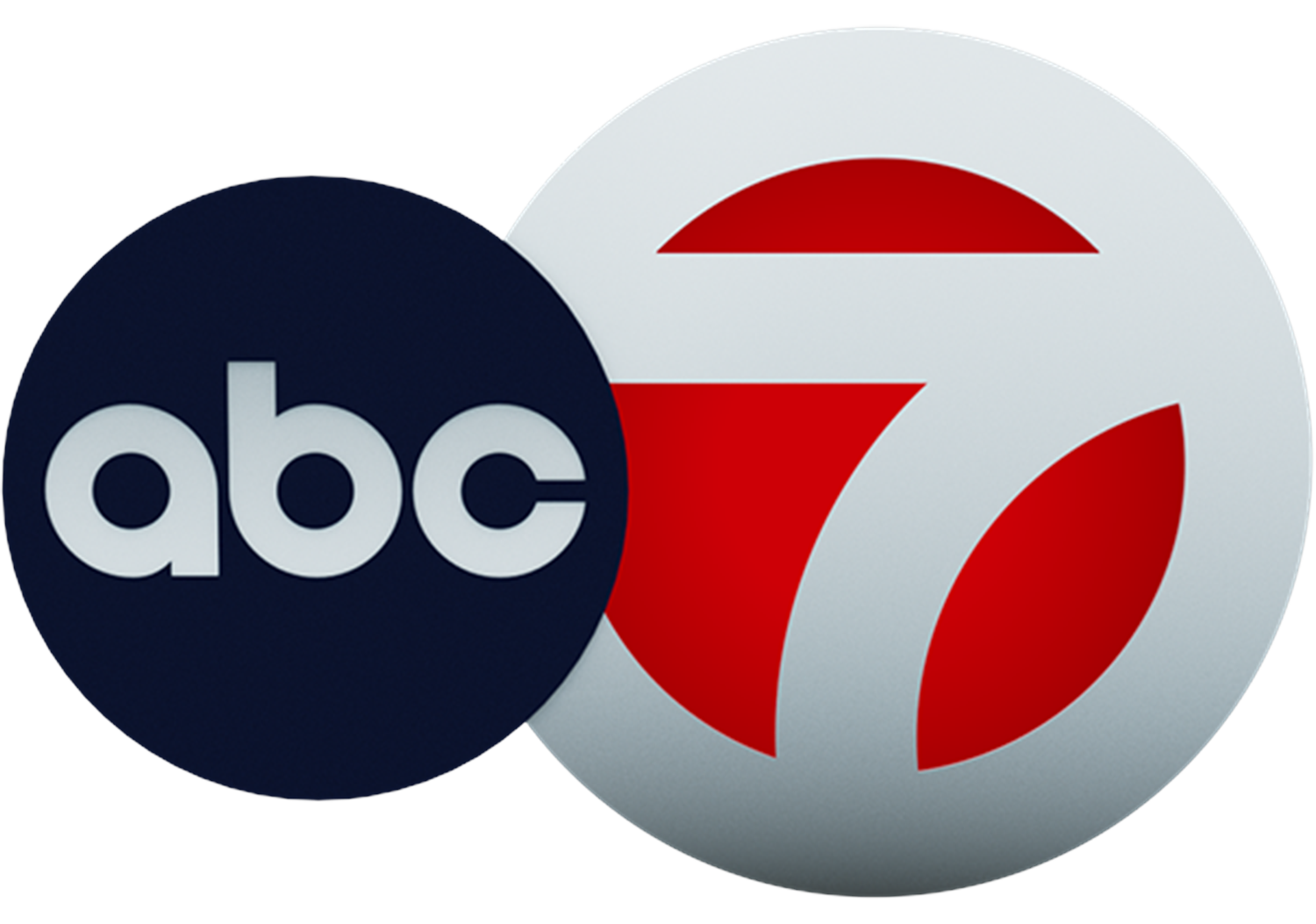

- El Paso, Texas; Las Cruces, New Mexico; United States
- City: El Paso, Texas
- Channels: Digital: 17 (UHF); Virtual: 7
- Branding: 7.1: ABC 7; 7.2: El Paso–Las Cruces CW

Programming
- Affiliations: 7.1: ABC; 7.2: The CW; for others, see § Subchannels

Ownership
- Owner: News-Press & Gazette Company; (NPG of Texas, L.P.)

History
- First air date: September 1, 1956
- Former call signs: KILT (1956–1957); KELP-TV (1957–1976)
- Former channel numbers: Analog: 13 (VHF, 1956–1981), 7 (VHF, 1981–2009); Digital: 17 (UHF, 2002–2009), 7 (VHF, 2009–2014)
- Former affiliations: Independent (1956); Azteca América (7.4, 2008–2022)

Technical information
- Licensing authority: FCC
- Facility ID: 49832
- ERP: 263 kW
- HAAT: 577 m (1,893 ft)
- Transmitter coordinates: 31°48′18.9″N 106°29′0.7″W
- Translator(s): see § Translators

Links
- Public license information: Public file; LMS
- Website: www.kvia.com

KVIA-TV (channel 7) is a television station in El Paso, Texas, United States, affiliated with ABC and The CW. Owned by the News-Press & Gazette Company, the station maintains studios on Rio Bravo Street in northwest El Paso and a transmitter atop the Franklin Mountains within the El Paso city limits.

After an earlier permittee opted not to build, El Paso's third commercial television station began in 1956 as KILT on channel 13, the only television station built from the ground up by Gordon McLendon. It was co-owned with radio station KELP (920 AM) and became known as KELP-TV in 1957 when McLendon sold his El Paso broadcast holdings. The call sign changed to KVIA-TV in 1976 when Marsh Media acquired the station. To improve ratings, Marsh opted to duplicate the successful formula of its KVII-TV in Amarillo; in 1981, the station moved from channel 13 to channel 7 in a switch with local public station KCOS. News-Press & Gazette Company acquired KVIA-TV in 1995, marking its return to the television stations business.

== History ==
Interest in channel 13—the originally authorized third commercial channel in El Paso, Texas—dated to the opening of television station applications after the end of the four-year freeze imposed by the Federal Communications Commission (FCC) in 1952. El Paso radio station KEPO applied for a channel 13 construction permit in July 1952 and received it in October. KEPO-TV would have been the third television station on air in El Paso after KROD-TV (channel 4, now KDBC-TV) and KTSM-TV (channel 9). An antenna atop the Franklin Mountains was announced, as was affiliation with ABC (to match KEPO radio) and the ordering of equipment, but KEPO management announced on December 23, 1953, that they had surrendered the permit and abandoned their television station plans. Station president Miller Robertson stated, "After a thorough analysis of the TV market here, and considering that two other TV stations already are in operation, we have definitely decided that a third TV station for El Paso is not feasible at this time."

=== Construction ===
Within days of KEPO's announcement, another El Paso radio station immediately announced its interest in joining the television fray. KELP (920 AM) announced on January 2, 1954, that they would apply for channel 13. For the Trinity Broadcasting Corporation, a company owned by broadcaster Gordon McLendon, it was the company's second proposed station, as the firm held a construction permit for the never-built KLIF-TV in Dallas. Even though KELP was an English-language radio station, it was announced that the new TV station would broadcast entirely in Spanish, which would have made KELP-TV the first Spanish-language television station in the United States.

The FCC awarded Trinity the construction permit on March 18, 1954. However, activity was slowed down when McLendon petitioned the FCC to switch his station to channel 7, which had been reserved for educational use, so as to gain a more competitive dial position; El Paso city schools and Texas Western College supported the proposal. This proposal was declined by the FCC in January 1955.

Construction activity moved apace on the station, which changed call signs from KELP-TV to KOKE (in September 1954) and then KILT (in 1956), and KILT began broadcasting on September 1, 1956, as an English-language station. This made it the only television station built from the ground up by McLendon, whose only other startup venture was KLIF radio in Dallas. Two months passed before the station affiliated with ABC in early November.

=== Harris–Alexander and Walton ownership ===
In March 1957, McLendon sold KELP and KILT to KELP Television Corporation, whose owners—Joseph Harris and Norman Alexander—were the same as KXLY-AM-TV in Spokane, Washington, for $750,000. On May 1, the new owners restored the KELP-TV call sign to channel 13 as part of their takeover. (The KILT call letters were retained by McLendon and placed on a radio station in Houston that same month.) KELP Television moved the transmitter from its original in-town site, with the studios at 4530 Delta, to the Franklin Mountains in 1960.

After six months of negotiations, Harris and Alexander announced the sale of KELP radio and television to John B. Walton in September 1965. Walton broke ground that May on a new studio complex in the Executive Park area for the KELP stations, which would contain new color equipment for the TV station. The new facilities, opened in April 1967, included an outdoor studio complete with a swimming pool and fountain. The facility was expanded again in 1973.

During this time, Walton also expanded KELP-TV's reach. In 1966, he had bought KAVE-TV (channel 6) in Carlsbad, New Mexico, which he originally ran as a satellite station of his KVKM-TV in Monahans, Texas. Three years later, when Walton sold KVKM-TV, KAVE-TV was converted to relaying KELP-TV, which it would do for the next 24 years.

=== Marsh Media ownership ===
In March 1975, Marsh Media, a company owned by Stanley Marsh 3, sued Walton in Texas district court for breach of contract. In 1967, Walton had sold to the Marsh family KVII-TV, the ABC affiliate in Amarillo, and the right of first refusal to purchase several other Walton stations. The Marsh family contended that, even though they had the right to be the lender of first choice, a transfer of stock to Helen B. Walton and the placement of Walton stock as collateral with a bank violated their contract. In October, Marsh exercised its option to purchase KELP-TV and KAVE-TV from Walton for $3,075,000, separating KELP television from the radio station. Marsh took control in April 1976, and a new KVIA-TV call sign was adopted on April 9.

Walton and Marsh each supported efforts to establish a public television station in El Paso, KCOS, on the originally assigned educational channel 7. KVIA-TV and KCOS shared a tower, and Marsh granted half-ownership in a new combined antenna to broadcast channels 7 and 13. Delays had previously been experienced when channel 13 was sold, as the agreement had to be renegotiated. The agreement also contained a clause by which, if both parties and the FCC agreed, KVIA and KCOS could swap channel designations, moving KCOS to channel 13 and KVIA-TV to channel 7. The FCC approved this in June 1981, and the change took effect on July 10. Reasons cited for the move included placing KVIA-TV between the other two network affiliates—as McLendon had sought to do in 1955—as well as aligning KVIA-TV with the various ABC owned-and-operated stations—and KVII-TV—that also broadcast on channel 7.

Marsh Media also experimented with more local autonomy for KAVE-TV in Carlsbad. Marsh invested a reported $1 million to set up a local operation in the city to originate regional news coverage for southeastern New Mexico. On September 2, 1982, KAVE-TV began airing its own evening newscast. However, Marsh admitted that it had overestimated the regional economy when it conducted a round of layoffs at KAVE-TV the next year, reducing its full-time staff from 22 to 16. That year, the station switched from broadcasting on Mountain Time to Central Time, which at the time was used by the other southeastern New Mexico TV stations, KBIM-TV and KSWS-TV. This had the effect of moving the Carlsbad newscasts to 5:30 and 9 p.m. However, Marsh folded the local operation in July 1984, with a company spokesman stating that it "did not prove to be economically feasible". In 1987, the station changed its call sign to KVIO-TV; six years later, Marsh sold it to Pulitzer Broadcasting, then-owner of fellow ABC affiliate KOAT-TV in Albuquerque, which changed its call letters to KOCT and converted it into a satellite of KOAT.

=== NPG ownership ===
Marsh Media announced the sale of KVIA-TV to the News-Press & Gazette Company of St. Joseph, Missouri, in August 1994. For NPG, it marked a return to television; the company had previously owned and sold an eight-station group. The $19.9 million transaction closed in January 1995.

While KVIA briefly experienced personnel turmoil in 1999 upon the departure of general manager Art Olivas, it rebounded under his replacement, Kevin Lovell, a former weekend sports anchor in the early 1980s who returned to KVIA in 1995 and remained with the station until his 2022 retirement.

In 2006, KVIA started a second digital subchannel to carry The CW. Neither of the predecessor networks, UPN or The WB, had been seen over-the-air in El Paso since 2002, when the local affiliate for both networks, KKWB, was sold and became Spanish-language KTFN. Time Warner Cable did not broadcast the subchannel to its El Paso-area subscribers until April 2007.

== News operation ==
When Marsh purchased the then-KELP-TV, its local newscasts were in third place in the El Paso market. The company sought to replicate the success it had in Amarillo, where KVII-TV had been turned around from a distant third into one of the nation's highest-rated ABC affiliates and commanded 65% of the local news audience. Jim Pratt was sent from Amarillo to El Paso to lead an overhaul of the KVIA-TV news operation. The Pro News title and "happy talk" format used in Amarillo were brought to El Paso, creating what one El Paso Times columnist called a "volatile menudo" between out-of-town and local personnel. Shortly after, morale hit a highly visible nadir, as channel 13's ratings gains did not match those of the ABC network. During a commercial break in the late newscast on December 31, 1977, Pratt and co-anchor Al Hinojos engaged in a fistfight over scriptwriting duties. When the newscast returned, Hinojos had left the set. Pratt resigned days later and was replaced by Hinojos.

Ratings began to improve in the late 1970s. By early 1979, the 6 p.m. newscast had inched up to second place and the 10 p.m. newscast into a tie for first. While KDBC-TV remained the news leader in El Paso, the three stations engaged in fierce competition throughout the 1980s for viewers. In 1988, KVIA-TV broke through and began a run as the number-one station in early and late evening news, and five years later, KDBC-TV anchor Estela Casas left that station to become the new main female anchor on KVIA's newscasts, joining channel 7 mainstay Gary Warner.

However, the 1990s would eventually belong to a revitalized KTSM-TV in the news ratings. In 1991, several employees defected to channel 9, where they reunited with Richard Pearson, a former KVIA general manager who departed to head up KTSM radio and television. The two stations traded ratings wins for much of the decade, but by 1998, channel 9 had emerged as the clear leader in the market.

The Casas–Warner tandem continued on the air until 2008, when Warner retired after a 34-year association with the station dating to 1974 (preceded by a year at KELP radio), only interrupted by a brief stint with CNN. By 2012, KVIA-TV had returned to being the news ratings leader in the market among English-language stations.

=== Notable former on-air staff ===
- Tom Costello — reporter, c. 1987
- Patricio G. Espinoza — reporter, c. 1993
- Amy Jacobson
- Indra Petersons — meteorologist, c. 2002
- Art Rascon — reporter, 1987–1988

== Technical information ==
=== Subchannels ===
KVIA-TV's transmitter is located atop the Franklin Mountains. The station's signal is multiplexed:

Subchannels of KVIA-TV
Subchannel	Res.	Short name	Programming
7.1	720p	KVIA DT	ABC
7.2	1080i	CW	The CW
7.3	480i	ION	Ion (4:3)
7.4	480i	QVC	QVC (4:3)
7.5	480i	LAFF	Laff
7.6	480i	IONPLUS	Ion Plus
7.7	480i	GRIT	Grit
7.8	480i	CONFESS	Confess

=== Analog-to-digital conversion ===
KVIA-TV shut down its analog signal, over VHF channel 7, at 12:30 p.m. on June 12, 2009, the official date on which full-power television in the United States transitioned from analog to digital broadcasts under federal mandate. The station's digital signal relocated from its pre-transition UHF channel 17 to VHF channel 7 for post-transition operations. Due to reports of reception issues with its signal, KVIA was granted permission by the Federal Communications Commission to operate a secondary signal on its former UHF digital channel 17 under special temporary authorization on July 23, 2009. Tests were conducted of signal strength from the VHF and UHF transmitters. KVIA later filed a petition to the FCC to permanently operate its digital signal exclusively on UHF channel 17, which the commission approved in 2011. The license to operate on channel 17 was issued on October 10, 2014.

=== Translators ===
KVIA-TV maintains three translators that rebroadcast its signal into communities in southern New Mexico. The Alamogordo translator began broadcasting while the station was still KELP-TV; the Deming translator was built in the late 1970s, and the Las Cruces translator was added in 1986.

- Alamogordo: K21LR-D
- Deming: K31KB-D
- Las Cruces, Organ: K19LZ-D

== See also ==
- Channel 17 digital TV stations in the United States
- Channel 7 virtual TV stations in the United States
