= Ben Swann =

American television news anchor, political commentator and journalist

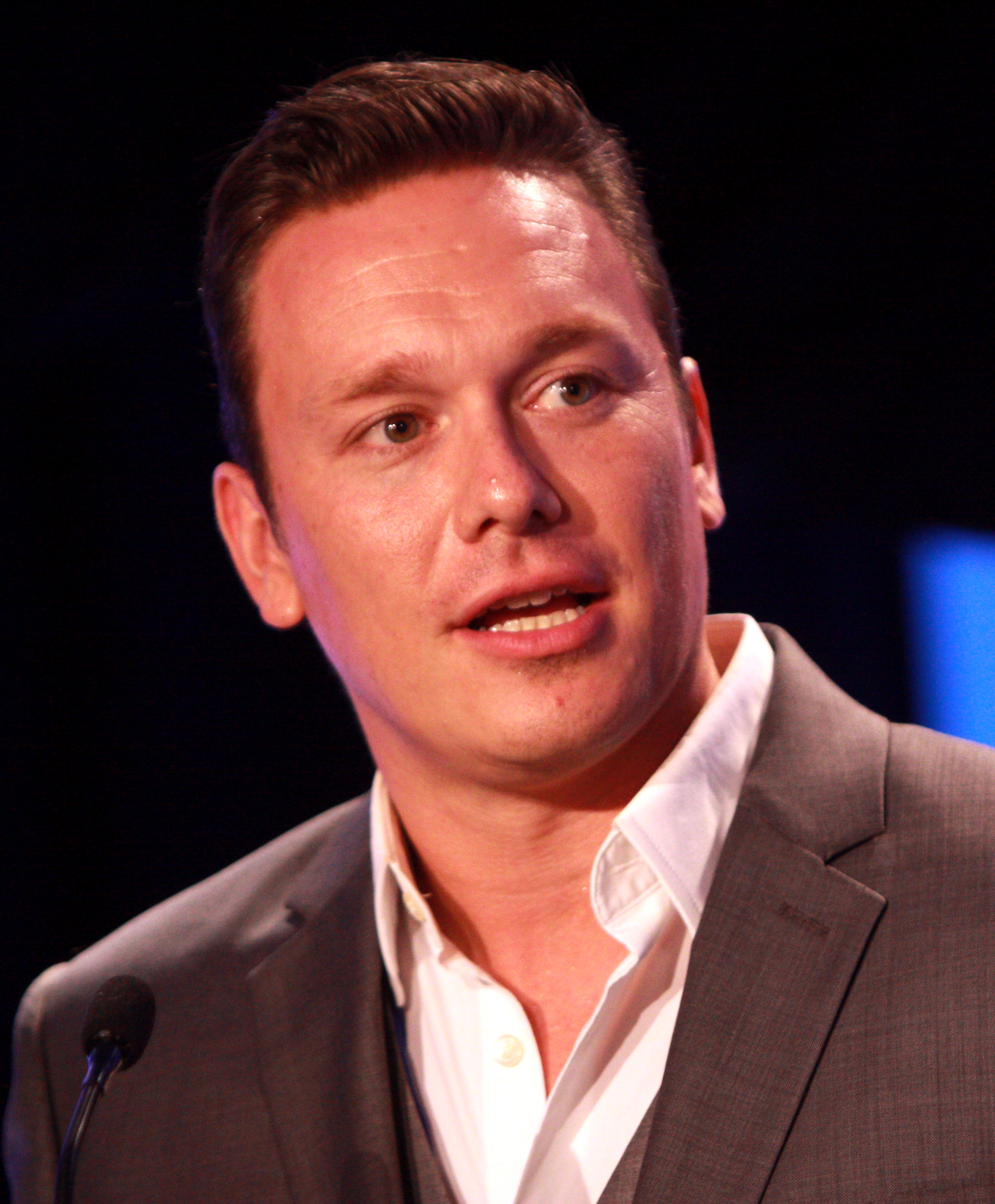
- Swann in 2013
- Born: Benjamin Swann; July 17, 1978 (age 48); El Paso, Texas, U.S.
- Education: Brigham Young University; California State University, Dominguez Hills
- Occupation: Journalist
- Television: KDBC-TV El Paso (by 1998); KFOX-TV El Paso (1998–2007); KTSM-TV El Paso (2008–2010); WXIX-TV Newport, KY-Cincinnati (2010–2013); RT America (2014–2015 and 2018–2022); WGCL-TV Atlanta (2015–2018)
- Children: 5
- Website: truthinmedia.com

Benjamin Swann (born July 17, 1978) is an American television news anchor, investigative journalist, and conspiracy theorist. He became a TV sports producer, and later a news journalist and producer, and managing editor on network affiliates, Fox, and RT America of the Russian state-owned TV network RT.

Swann created a news segment called Reality Check while working at WXIX-TV in Cincinnati and WGCL-TV in Atlanta, in which he covered "issues other media is not looking at" and uncritically presented alt-right conspiracy theories. He garnered praise for a 2012 in-person interview with President Barack Obama about the so-called "kill list" which is used to direct drone strikes against American citizens, like Anwar al-Awlaki. Swann reported on conspiracy theories about the 2012 Aurora, Colorado shooting, questioned the truth of the Sandy Hook Elementary School shooting, presented 9/11 conspiracy theories, and the claims of a cover-up by the CDC of data related to the MMR vaccine and autism. He has also questioned the use of chemical weapons in the Syrian Civil War, whether the United States had a role in the development of the Islamic State, and other controversial topics.

In 2017, after his then-employer, WGCL-TV in Atlanta, aired a Reality Check which presented the Pizzagate conspiracy theory as potentially true, Swann was forced by WGCL to bring down his Truth in Media website and all of his social media. About a year later, he was fired when WGCL learned that Swann was planning to relaunch Truth in Media.

== Education ==
Swann was homeschooled with nine brothers and sisters in El Paso, Texas, and earned a bachelor's degree in liberal arts from Brigham Young University in 1993, at the age of 15, and a master's degree in history from California State University, Dominguez Hills in 1994, at the age of 16.

== Career ==
=== Early work ===
At the age of 15, Swann became a youth pastor at his local Baptist Church in Canutillo in El Paso County, Texas. At the age of 19, he began preaching at revivals in Texas. Unable to find a position as a pastor in El Paso, he followed a suggestion from one of his brothers to gain a job in TV news. At that time, four of his brothers worked in television, three of the four being news cameramen. He worked for a period of time for KDBC-TV before, in 1998, moving to KFOX-TV, the Fox station in El Paso, to work as a news cameraman himself.

After working as an assistant pastor in Portland, Oregon, Swann returned to KFOX-TV as a sports producer. He then filmed, edited, and reported news and sports stories before becoming a morning co-anchor and managing editor at the station. In 2008, he became an evening news anchor for the NBC affiliate, KTSM-TV. He won regional Emmy Awards in 2005 and 2009, as well as a national Edward R. Murrow Award in 2002 for coverage of Alexandra Flores. During this period, Swann was an investigative journalist for the Christian Broadcasting Network (CBN News), covering the illegal drug trade at the southern border.

=== WXIX-TV in Cincinnati ===
He left El Paso in December 2010 to become an evening TV news presenter at WXIX-TV, the Fox affiliate in Cincinnati, co-anchoring with Tricia Macke. Shortly after joining the station, Swann began producing a thrice-weekly news segment series, titled Reality Check, which he described as investigating "issues other media is not looking at". The series reflected Swann's libertarian views and his advocacy of Ron Paul's positions. One theme of Swann's Reality Check was Ron Paul's presidential campaign, with his goal of providing fairer coverage for Paul than the conservative or liberal national press, including an episode about the "Ron Paul newsletters" which contradicted the findings of The New Republic columnist James Kirchick, who broke the story.

In September 2012, one segment of Reality Check went viral and received a great deal of media attention. In it, Swann was able to obtain a 7-minute one-on-one interview with President Barack Obama while on an election campaign stop in Ohio—a rare opportunity for a local news reporter. Swann asked the President direct questions about the so-called presidential "kill list" which had been used to direct drone strikes against terrorism suspects, and the legality of the list including U.S. citizens, like Anwar al-Awlaki and teenage son Abdulrahman al-Awlaki. Answering Swann's questions, Obama responded by saying news reports about the list have never been confirmed by him and that drone strikes in Yemen would help bring U.S. soldiers stationed in Afghanistan home sooner. Several journalism and civil liberties watchdogs praised Swann's fact-checking work on the segment, such as Conor Friedersdorf of The Atlantic, Glenn Greenwald of The Guardian, Byron Tau of Politico, The Huffington Post, and the Columbia Journalism Review.

Swann broke several details about local officials at the Cincinnati IRS office involved in the IRS targeting controversy which were picked up in national news media and led to Swann making brief appearances on Fox News.

In April 2013, Swann announced he would be leaving WXIX-TV at the end of May.

=== Truth in Media and other projects ===
While working at WXIX-TV, Swann started a Facebook page called "Full Disclosure" where, according to Adweek, he asked "questions about controversial subjects he says are ignored by the national media". On October 23, 2012, Swann served as a panel member on a third-party presidential candidates debate hosted by Larry King in Chicago, Illinois, and broadcast on C-SPAN, Al Jazeera America, and online through the sponsorship of the Free & Equal Elections Foundation.

After leaving WXIX-TV, Swann started a social media channel called "Truth in Media" to continue production of his show Reality Check. Truth in Media was a collaboration with Republican Liberty Caucus and Joshua Cook. His Reality Check, according to The Daily Beast, echoes talking points from media outlets such as RT and InfoWars. Swann's Reality Check segments were uploaded to his YouTube channel and garnered 10,376,570 views and over 73,500 subscribers before he took his channel offline. In 2017, Swann has sought crowdfunding via his 419,000 Facebook followers for an episode titled, "U.S. and partners intentionally created ISIS".

From May 2013 until June 2015, Swann appeared regularly on RT America in Washington, D.C. For three months in 2014 he hosted the Ben Swann Radio Show on the Republic Broadcasting Network which is, according to the media watchdog Media Matters for America, a far-right network which has aired Holocaust denial and other antisemitic conspiracy theories.

=== WGCL-TV in Atlanta ===
In June 2015, he was hired by WGCL-TV, then the CBS affiliate in Atlanta, where he revived his fact-checking segment under the title Reality Check With Ben Swann and was made part of the station's new investigative unit.

He was suspended in January 2017 for running a story attempting to revive the Pizzagate conspiracy theory, in which Swann called for an "investigation" into the months-old false claims that a Washington, D.C. pizza restaurant was hiding a child sex trafficking ring in its non-existent basement, citing anonymous Internet users as his sources; The Atlanta Journal-Constitution noted that Swann had apparently done no independent reporting on the topic. He was reinstated after he took down his Truth in Media and Reality Check sites. He was fired on January 29, 2018, after the station learned that he had been trying to revive Truth in Media without their knowledge and permission. According to The Atlanta Journal-Constitution, Swann's Reality Check segment had "often veered into alt-right conspiracy theories".

=== Current work ===
Swann relaunched Truth in Media in 2018 after he was fired by WGCL-TV. Starting in 2018 he began publishing pieces for the Liberty Nation website. Swann launched the Isegoria social media platform, named from the ancient Greek meaning "Equality of all in freedom of speech". He later returned to RT America in 2018. In FARA filings disclosed in August 2022, Swann was paid $6.8 million by the Russian government in order to produce propaganda TV content for the South America, Indian, and Chinese markets.

Axios and Politico reported Swann's production company was to produce four shows for TV Novosti -- which owns Russia Today -- Russian firm Kart LLC, and Armenian Stark Industries LLC. The themes of the Russian-backed programs would be "the United States and NATO continuing to spread war", "the economic warfare waged by the United States and its allies" and "transgender issues in the United States". Additionally, Axios reported "Swann also received more than $600,000 to pay employees of [RT America production company] T&R productions who were laid off when [RT America] closed".

In October 2021, Swann's Isegoria platform launched Sovren Media, a self-described "uncensored, blockchain-based, decentralized news and entertainment platform".

== Views and claims ==
Swann has reported on many conspiracy theories and false claims, several of which are aligned with narratives pushed by his former employer, the Russian state-run RT. On his personal YouTube channel, Swann posted videos discussing debunked conspiracy theories about the Sandy Hook Elementary School shooting, including a conspiracy theory that shooter did not commit the act alone. He also discounted the conclusion that 2012 Aurora, Colorado shooting was conducted by a lone gunman. There is no evidence that any additional shooters were present at the shootings. The theory of multiple gunmen may have been influenced by early news reports of the events. Swann also has questioned whether 7 World Trade Center collapsed the way authorities said it did on September 11, 2001.

In December 2016, one of Swann's WGCL Reality Check segments on the Syrian Civil War titled "If [Syrian President Bashar al] Assad is Committing Genocide in Aleppo, Why Are People Celebrating in the Streets?" went viral on Facebook. Ben Collins of The Daily Beast said this "mirrors a narrative within several stories written by Kremlin state media outfit RT in the past several weeks".

In an appearance on RT America in 2015, Swann said that "any credible evidence does not seem to exist" that Russia shot down Malaysia Airlines Flight 17. The plane's crash was investigated by the Dutch Safety Board (DSB) and the Dutch-led joint investigation team (JIT), who concluded that the airliner was downed by a Buk surface-to-air missile launched from pro-Russian separatist-controlled territory in Ukraine.

Swann was described by David Gorski as "antivaccine-sympathetic" for reporting on "CDC whistleblower" documents from William Thompson, a doctor working for the Centers for Disease Control – documents that have not shown evidence that the CDC covered-up a connection between the MMR vaccine and autism.

He later dedicated a Reality Check segment to the debunked Pizzagate conspiracy theory that emerged during the 2016 United States presidential election cycle, contending that Pizzagate may have been true, and called for a police investigation of the allegations. Misinformation regarding Pizzagate was spread through social media and websites. The story was discredited by a wide array of organizations, including the Metropolitan Police Department of the District of Columbia, fact-checking sites, and reputable news organizations. After the Pizzagate segment aired, Swann was briefly suspended from WGCL-TV and he later closed some of his social media accounts, but he left one Facebook account open, on which he continued to post conspiracy-related and anti-government memes.

== Personal life ==
Swann married his wife in 1999. He lived in Portland, Oregon, where he was an assistant pastor at a Presbyterian church. After six or 18 months, he moved back to El Paso. Swann and his wife have five children, who have been home-schooled by his wife. He was ordained in 2000 in the Southern Baptist Convention. In 2001, he was hired as the youth minister for the Trinity First United Methodist Church in El Paso. As of 2014, he had been a youth pastor for 17 years.
