= KFOX-TV =

Television station in El Paso, Texas

ATSC 3.0 station
- El Paso, Texas; Las Cruces, New Mexico; United States
- City: El Paso, Texas
- Channels: Digital: 15 (UHF); Virtual: 14
- Branding: KFOX 14 (pronounced "K-Fox")

Programming
- Affiliations: 14.1: Fox; for others, see § Subchannels

Ownership
- Owner: Sinclair Broadcast Group; (KFOX Licensee, LLC)
- Sister stations: KDBC-TV

History
- First air date: August 1, 1979
- Former call signs: KCIK (1979–1982); KCIK-TV (1982–1994)
- Former channel numbers: Analog: 14 (UHF, 1979–2009)
- Former affiliations: Independent (1979–1986)
- Call sign meaning: Reflects its Fox affiliation

Technical information
- Licensing authority: FCC
- Facility ID: 33716
- ERP: 1,000 kW
- HAAT: 602 m (1,975 ft)
- Transmitter coordinates: 31°48′55″N 106°29′22″W

Links
- Public license information: Public file; LMS
- Website: kfoxtv.com

KFOX-TV (channel 14) is a television station in El Paso, Texas, United States, affiliated with the Fox network. It is owned by Sinclair Broadcast Group alongside dual CBS/MyNetworkTV affiliate KDBC-TV (channel 4). The two stations share studios on South Alto Mesa Drive in northwest El Paso; KFOX-TV's transmitter is located atop the Franklin Mountains.

Established as El Paso's first independent station in 1979 after years of telecasting Christian programs on cable, the station as KCIK struggled financially and introduced secular entertainment programs. While it was owned in turn by two Christian groups, it continued this orientation and affiliated with Fox in 1986. It prospered with the new affiliation and introduced local news in 1997 after being sold to Cox Television. Sinclair acquired KFOX and KDBC in separate transactions in 2013, combining their operations. The KFOX transmitter provides ATSC 3.0 (NextGen TV) service in the El Paso area.

== History ==
=== Launch and early years ===
Six years before a signal was broadcast on channel 14 in El Paso, the foundation was laid for the station that would occupy it with the launch of a Christian television station, known as International Christian Television (ICT), on El Paso's cable system in 1973. The station was operated by a company known as Missionary Radio Evangelism, Inc. (MRE), led by Pete Warren and Alex Blomerth, and began to telecast seven days a week on cable channel 8 in 1974. That year, it purchased its first mobile production van. As early as mid-1974, the group had its sights set on building UHF channel 14 in El Paso: its club of donors was the "1400 Club", and it was soliciting donations with an eye to building capacity to make the leap. Pledge drives were also held to raise funds.

On May 24, 1976, Missionary Radio Evangelism filed a formal application with the Federal Communications Commission (FCC) for a channel 14 construction permit, which was granted on December 23. While ICT/MRE promised an Easter 1977 launch after getting the permit, viewers would have to wait longer than that. In March 1978, the station signed a lease for a tower in the Franklin Mountains owned by John Walton, who had recently sold off KELP-TV (renamed KVIA-TV) without the transmitter site. This 308-foot (94 m) tower, already in use for two-way radio communications, had to be accessed by a tramway.

After dealing with a six-week setback due to an antenna that, once installed, was found to be damaged and had to be sent back to the factory for repairs, construction was complete by July 1979, and ICT's cable channel 8 was officially subsumed by the new KCIK ("Christ is King") on August 1, 1979. From the start, the station provided secular entertainment and sports, alongside Christian shows including The 700 Club and The PTL Club.

KCIK was not an instant success. By 1981, Missionary Radio Evangelism was facing financial troubles, citing poor local support, and courting buyers for the television station. Rock Church, a ministry based in Virginia which had a national program on the Christian Broadcasting Network, entered into negotiations to purchase channel 14. It sought to run the station with a bilingual Christian lineup to reach viewers in El Paso and across the Mexican border in Ciudad Juárez. However, negotiations did not go well. Rock Church's pastor, John Gimenez, was brought in as manager by MRE at the start of December. However, KCIK's board soon realized this was a mistake because it represented a premature transfer of control to Rock Church without an application, forbidden by the FCC, and he resigned within hours of his appointment. Ultimately, the Rock Church bid fell apart when the church could not finance the station's operating costs and because it did not desire to take on the station's liabilities.

=== De Rance, Mulderrig, and Cox years ===
Missionary Radio Evangelism, still facing indebtedness and what it termed as "cash flow difficulties", continued to find a buyer, and the De Rance Foundation, a Catholic organization from Milwaukee, acquired 20 percent of KCIK in 1982 with an option to purchase the rest. It was the first broadcasting property owned by De Rance and marked the station's transition to a full-time secular independent. De Rance acquired the remainder in 1983.

The new owners moved to bolster programming, even airing Nightline when KVIA-TV dropped it from its schedule. After a shift in strategy to further deemphasize religious programs, in 1986, KCIK-TV signed up as a charter affiliate of Fox, an arrangement its general manager called a "no-lose situation". Because Fox offered little programming at the outset, the station still considered itself an independent with a stronger "independent look".

After a high-profile failure of its Catholic television programming elsewhere at its other broadcast property, KIHS-TV in the Los Angeles market, the De Rance Foundation began its retreat from broadcasting. Having paid $5 million for the station in 1982, it sold the station at a loss for the same price six years later to John and Betty Ann Mulderrig of New York, who owned no other television stations, at a time when it had "turned the corner", per its general manager. Mulderrig had previously been an executive at WWOR-TV in the New York City area. KCIK-TV was posting ratings in some time periods that made it one of the highest-rated independent stations in the United States, and it had made money for the first time ever in 1987. To enhance its connection to the network, the station at the start of 1994 changed its call letters to KFOX-TV. Mulderrig moved the station later that year into a former Coronado Bank building at 6004 North Mesa Street, having outgrown the original studios on Stanton Street.

KFOX logo used from 1999 to 2008.

In 1996, Mulderrig sold KFOX-TV for $21 million to Cox Television, bringing to a close an eight-year ownership that had seen the station and its network grow. Cox started a local newsroom in El Paso in 1997.

KFOX-TV began transmitting a digital television signal in January 2003. KFOX-TV ended regular programming on its analog signal, over UHF channel 14, at midnight on June 12, 2009, the official date on which full-power television stations in the United States transitioned from analog to digital broadcasts under federal mandate. The station's digital signal remained on its pre-transition UHF channel 15, using virtual channel 14. As part of the SAFER Act, KFOX-TV kept its analog signal on the air until July 12 to inform viewers of the digital television transition through a loop of public service announcements from the National Association of Broadcasters.

=== Purchase by Sinclair and merger with KDBC ===
On July 20, 2012, one day after Cox purchased four television stations in Jacksonville and Tulsa, Oklahoma, from Newport Television, Cox put KFOX-TV and three other television operations in smaller markets—Johnstown, Pennsylvania, Steubenville, Ohio, and Reno, Nevada—along with several of its radio stations in medium to small markets up for sale. On February 25, 2013, Cox announced that it would sell the four television stations to the Sinclair Broadcast Group. The sale was approved by the FCC on April 29 and finalized on May 2.

That April, Titan TV Broadcast Group filed to sell CBS affiliate KDBC-TV to one of Sinclair's partner companies, Cunningham Broadcasting, which is effectively controlled by Sinclair through a series of trusts held by family members of Sinclair founder Julian Sinclair Smith. While two Big Four network affiliates, such as KFOX-TV and KDBC-TV, would normally not be allowed to be under common direct ownership as among the top four stations in the market, KINT-TV and KTDO both rated ahead of KDBC-TV, and KFOX-TV was sixth in total-day ratings, leading to FCC approval for Sinclair to own both stations outright in a deal consummated on October 1, 2013.

In 2014, Sinclair purchased and outfitted a new studio facility to house the two stations; KDBC's news had been produced from the studios of competitor KTSM-TV, and that station only had two dedicated staff members at the time.

== News operation ==
As soon as Cox took over KFOX-TV, it became apparent that a local newscast was in the works. Work occurred through 1997 on ordering new equipment, building a newsroom, and hiring talent; KFOX News at Nine, an hour long on weeknights and 30 minutes on weekends, debuted on September 15, 1997, as the market's first prime time local newscast. Most of the original on-air anchors were hired from outside of the market.

In January 2004, KFOX started a morning newscast, the KFOX Morning News; Ben Swann, previously a reporter in the station's Las Cruces bureau, was tapped as one of the first anchors. Originally three hours in length, a fourth hour was added in January 2016. The station's first early evening newscast, at 6 p.m., started in 2008 before changing to 5 p.m. in 2010.

On July 19, 2024, it was announced by Sinclair that "most and perhaps all of its local newscasts" on sister station KDBC would end by August 5. KDBC's 10 p.m. newscast would continue to air in the short term, while a simulcast of newscasts from KFOX would air during the day. A number of employees were to be laid off.

=== Notable former on-air staff ===
- Jacob Rascon – reporter, 2011–2012

== Technical information ==
=== Subchannels ===
The station's ATSC 1.0 channels are carried on the multiplexed signals of other El Paso television stations:

Subchannels provided by KFOX-TV (ATSC 1.0)
Subchannel	Res.	Short name	Programming	ATSC 1.0 host
14.1	720p	FOX	Fox	KTSM-TV
14.2	480i	Comet	Comet	KTDO
14.3	480i	Charge!	Charge!	KTDO
14.4	480i	TheNest	The Nest	KDBC-TV

Its transmitter, located atop the Franklin Mountains, began providing ATSC 3.0 (NextGen TV) simulcasts of five El Paso TV stations in December 2023.

Subchannels of KFOX-TV (ATSC 3.0)
Channel	Res.	Short name	Programming
4.1	1080p	CBS	CBS (KDBC-TV)
7.1	720p	KVIA DT	ABC (KVIA-TV)
9.1	1080p	KTSM-HD	NBC (KTSM-TV)
14.1	720p	FOX	Fox
14.10	1080p	T2	T2
14.11	1080p	PBTV	Pickleballtv
14.20	480p	GMLOOP	GameLoop
14.21	480p	ROXi	ROXi
48.1	1080p	KTDO-HD	Telemundo (KTDO)

Subchannel broadcast with digital rights management
Subchannel streamed via the Internet
