= KTSM-TV =

Television station in El Paso, Texas

- El Paso, Texas; United States
- City: El Paso, Texas
- Channels: Digital: 16 (UHF); Virtual: 9
- Branding: KTSM 9; KTSM 9 News

Programming
- Affiliations: 9.1: NBC; for others, see § Subchannels

Ownership
- Owner: Nexstar Media Group; (Nexstar Media Inc.)

History
- First air date: January 4, 1953
- Former channel numbers: Analog: 9 (VHF, 1953–2009); Digital: 16 (UHF, 2005–2009), 9 (VHF, 2009–2015)
- Call sign meaning: Tri-State Music, which started KTSM radio in 1929

Technical information
- Licensing authority: FCC
- Facility ID: 67760
- ERP: 250 kW
- HAAT: 577 m (1,893 ft)
- Transmitter coordinates: 31°48′18.9″N 106°29′0.7″W

Links
- Public license information: Public file; LMS
- Website: www.ktsm.com

KTSM-TV (channel 9) is a television station in El Paso, Texas, United States, affiliated with NBC and owned by Nexstar Media Group. The station's studios are located on Constitution Drive on El Paso's west side, and its transmitter is located atop the Franklin Mountains on the El Paso city limits.

KTSM-TV began broadcasting on January 4, 1953, as El Paso's second television station. It was owned by the Tri-State Broadcasting Company alongside KTSM (1380 AM) and was an NBC affiliate from its first day on the air. When it moved its transmitter to the Franklin Mountains in 1958, an aerial tramway—now known as the Wyler Aerial Tramway—was built to transport people and materials to the mountaintop site, later also serving as a tourist attraction. Through the 1970s and 1980s, the station was often in second or third place in local news ratings. In 1990, Karl O. Wyler—the controlling owner of Tri-State, whose career in El Paso broadcasting began in the 1920s—died. Wyler, a noted philanthropist, willed the stations in support of the El Paso Community Foundation. An affiliate of the foundation became the sole owner of the KTSM radio and television stations and hired Richard Pearson, general manager of competitor KVIA-TV (channel 7), to overhaul the operation. During the decade, KTSM became a contender in the news ratings.

In 1997, the KTSM stations were sold to Communications Corporation of America (ComCorp), which split the radio properties from KTSM-TV. It was the company's first TV station with a news operation. From 2009 to 2014, KTSM shared news resources with KDBC-TV, and between 2010 and 2020 it produced the newscasts seen on co-owned KVEO-TV in Brownsville. Nexstar acquired ComCorp's stations in 2014.

== Tri-State Broadcasting ownership ==
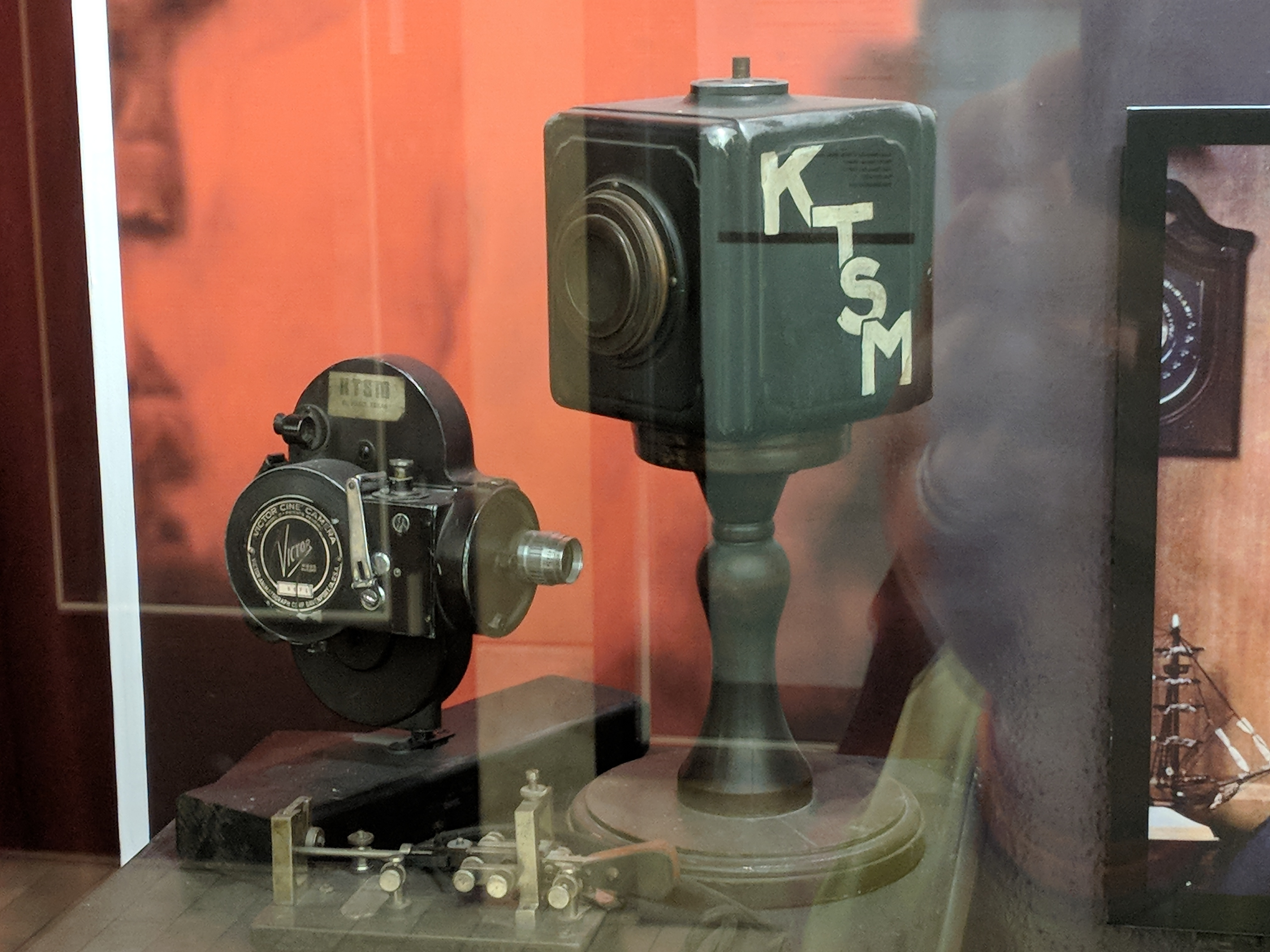
Old KTSM equipment on exhibit in the Mills Building, May 2018

The Tri-State Broadcasting Company, owner of radio station KTSM (1380 AM), filed with the Federal Communications Commission (FCC) on June 13, 1952, for a construction permit to build a television station on channel 9 in El Paso. The FCC granted the application on August 14. KTSM-TV broadcast its first test patterns on December 31, 1952, and began broadcasting programs on January 4, 1953. It was El Paso's second television station, after KROD-TV (channel 4, now KDBC-TV). The station shared studios at 801 Oregon Street with KTSM radio; the building had been designed in 1946 with an eye to future television use, with space for a TV control room, wiring, and a film room. Network cables reached KTSM-TV in time for the 1953 World Series. Local programming included a children's program, Uncle Roy's House.

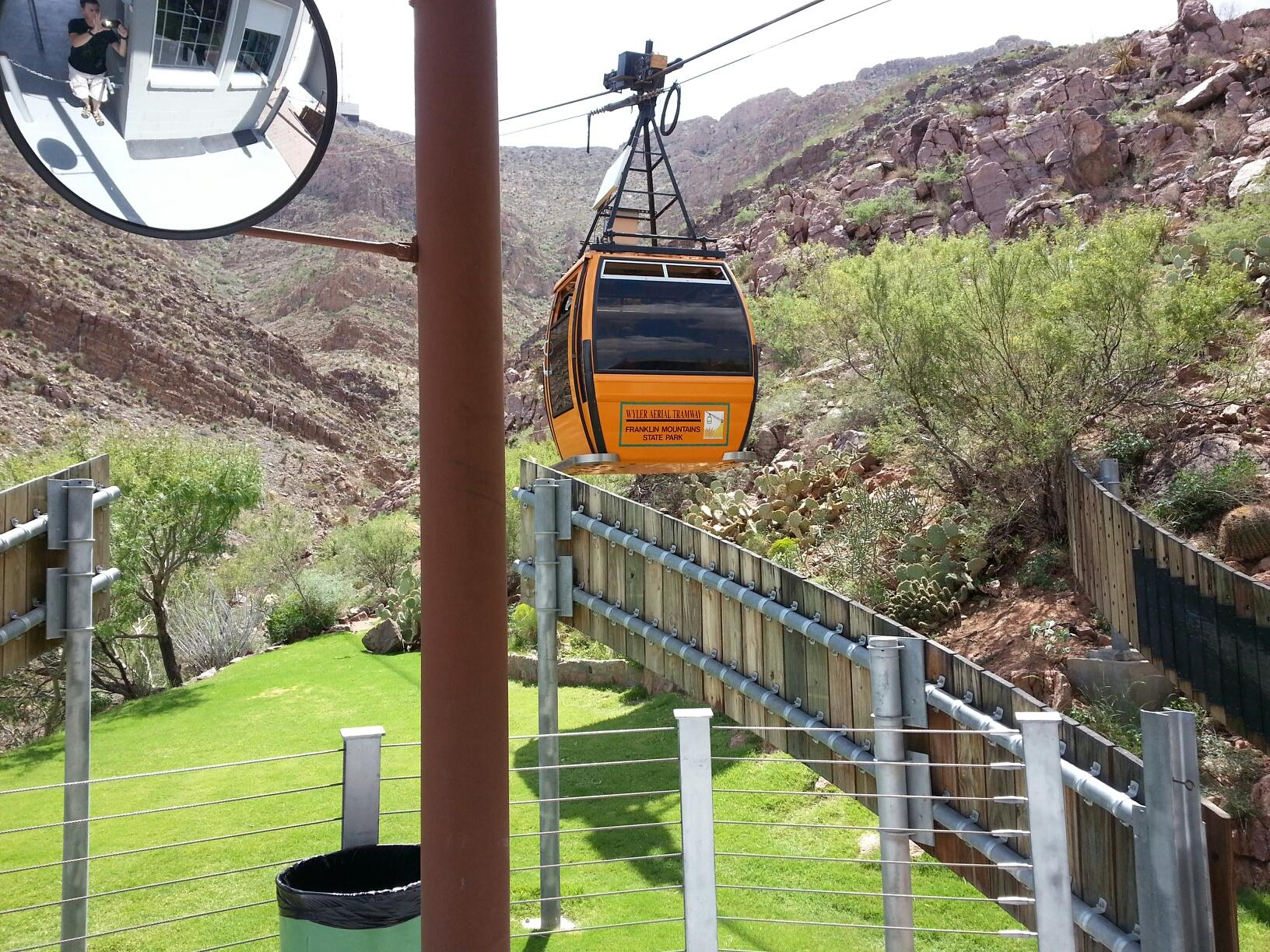
The Wyler Aerial Tramway was built in 1959 to transport people and equipment to KTSM-TV's new mountaintop transmitter site.

When KTSM-TV began telecasting, its transmitter site was located on unused land at the El Paso Electric Company's power plant on Santa Fe Street. KROD-TV, from the outset, was located on Franklin Mountains. In 1958, the station applied to move to Ranger Peak in the Franklins. Part of the project included constructing a tramway to transport construction supplies and passengers up the mountain. After the tramway was completed, construction on the new transmitter facility began in May 1959, and the new facility went into use in December. The tramway opened to tourist passenger service two months later. KTSM expanded its broadcasting activities in 1962 with the launch of KTSM-FM 99.9 and in 1967 with an addition to the Oregon Street studio to give the TV station more space. In December 1970, KTSM-TV began carrying the public television program Sesame Street, as El Paso lacked a public station at the time. In 1973, channel 9 was boosted to the maximum effective radiated power of 316,000 watts.

KTSM spent much of its history under Wyler as a third- or second-place station in news, trading places with KVIA-TV (channel 7) while KDBC was the consistent ratings leader. By 1985, the station was in a competitive three-way ratings race, but it had lower audience shares among Hispanics than its competition.

For its first 37 years of existence, KTSM-TV had one controlling owner and one general manager. Karl O. Wyler had put KTSM radio on the air in 1929 and became the majority owner of the Tri-State Broadcasting Company in 1951. It was his idea to build a tramway in lieu of a road to serve Ranger Peak—inspired by those in Estes Park, Colorado, and Cannon Mountain, New Hampshire. Wyler continued to run the KTSM stations until he died of a heart attack on December 20, 1990, aged 84. Wyler, who was recognized at his passing for his philanthropic and civic involvement, willed his 55-percent ownership in the Tri-State Broadcasting Company—as well as the tramway—to the Glyn Wyler and Karl O. Wyler Foundation, a supporting organization of the El Paso Community Foundation. Foundation management expected that the addition of these properties would triple its asset base to $75 million.

The foundation bought out the other owners of Tri-State Broadcasting in 1991. It hired KVIA-TV general manager Richard Pearson to run KTSM-TV; under Pearson, KVIA-TV had been the top-rated station in El Paso. Several KVIA employees followed Pearson to KTSM-TV, including its news director, program director, and local sales manager. The group faced a station that rated poorly in news and lacked stability in personnel. In August 1992, KTSM-TV rebranded as TSM and the operating company began doing business as Tri-State Media.

== ComCorp ownership ==
In 1996, a group led by Pearson sought a management buyout of the KTSM stations. After a citizen's complaint, the Texas Attorney General's office ruled that, because the ownership was a non-profit, bids had to be taken to sell the stations. About nine bids were received, with Communications Corporation of America (ComCorp) of Lafayette, Louisiana, acquiring the KTSM stations for $30 million. ComCorp owned television stations in Texas and Louisiana, mostly Fox affiliates and none of which had local news, as well as radio stations in Lafayette. ComCorp sold the radio stations to Clear Channel Communications in 1998. That year, White Knight Broadcasting acquired KKWB-TV (channel 65). White Knight was owned by Sheldon Galloway, son of ComCorp owner Thomas Galloway, and KTSM-TV managed KKWB-TV—which aired programming from The WB and UPN—under a local marketing agreement. White Knight sold KKWB-TV to Entravision Communications Corporation, which switched to the Spanish-language Telefutura network as KTFN in January 2002. Under ComCorp, KTSM-TV initially remained El Paso's top-rated local news station overall, in a close race with KVIA. Pearson retired in 2003, bringing to a close a 42-year career in which he had worked at each of the three major El Paso TV stations. By 2012, KVIA-TV had returned to being the news ratings leader in the market among English-language stations.

On October 19, 2009, ComCorp began providing services including advertising sales and newscast production to KDBC-TV, which retained separate newscasts produced from KTSM's studios with some sharing of resources. KDBC's newscasts had suffered from 15 years of declining ratings and cutbacks, and the station had been sold out of the bankruptcy of Pappas Telecasting to Titan TV Broadcast Group. The relationship ended in 2014 when Sinclair Broadcast Group, owner of KFOX-TV (channel 14), acquired KDBC, creating a new duopoly. In addition to KDBC, ComCorp used KTSM as the news production center for KVEO-TV in Brownsville, beginning in January 2010; news stories for the Rio Grande Valley were filed by local reporters and included in newscasts presented by KTSM-TV's on-air personalities.

== Nexstar ownership ==
On April 24, 2013, Communications Corporation of America announced the sale of its stations to Nexstar Broadcasting Group for $270 million. The sale of ComCorp to Nexstar received FCC approval on December 4, 2014. In 2018, KTSM moved to a location off Sunland Park Drive on the west side of El Paso. The previous site was then used as parking for El Paso Community College's Rio Grande Campus.

One of the first two reporters for Border Report, a news website owned by Nexstar, was based in El Paso. The idea for the website stemmed from a visit by senior Nexstar management, including CEO Perry Sook, to KTSM-TV in 2019. With Nexstar's 2020 acquisition of the facilities of KGBT-TV in Harlingen, it merged KVEO's news operation with that station's, ending El Paso–based news production for KVEO. In 2025, the station launched a new morning newscast featuring the duo of Mike and Tricia, familiar from their nearly two-decade-long stint as morning hosts at KSII (93.1 FM).

== Notable on-air staff ==
- Estela Casas – reporter, 1980s and 2023–present
- Micah Johnson – anchor and managing editor, 1990–1992
- Ben Swann – anchor, 2008–2010

== Technical information ==
=== Subchannels ===
KTSM-TV's transmitter is located in the Franklin Mountains. The station's signal is multiplexed:

Subchannels of KTSM-TV
Subchannel	Res.	Short name	Programming
9.1	1080i	KTSM-HD	NBC
9.2	480i	Estrell	Estrella TV
9.3	480i	Mystery	Ion Mystery
9.4	480i	Laff	Laff
14.1	720p	FOX	Fox (KFOX-TV)

Broadcast on behalf of another station

=== Analog-to-digital conversion ===
KTSM-TV shut down its analog signal, over VHF channel 9, at 12:30 p.m. on June 12, 2009, the official date on which full-power television stations in the United States transitioned from analog to digital broadcasts under federal mandate. The station's digital signal relocated from its pre-transition UHF channel 16 to VHF channel 9. However, many viewers lost KTSM-TV's digital signal when it moved to the VHF band. In July 2009, ComCorp was granted authority to resume broadcasting the channel 16 signal. In 2011, the FCC authorized the station to permanently move to channel 16.
