= KCWF =

KCWF may refer to:

- Chennault International Airport (ICAO code KCWF)
- KCWF-LP, a low-power television station (channel 20) licensed to Las Cruces, New Mexico, United States
