= KTDO =

Television station in Las Cruces, New Mexico

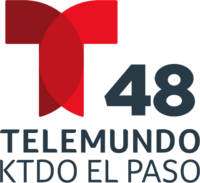
- Las Cruces, New Mexico–El Paso, Texas; United States
- City: Las Cruces, New Mexico
- Channels: Digital: 26 (UHF); Virtual: 48
- Branding: Telemundo 48; Noticiero Telemundo 48 (newscasts)

Programming
- Affiliations: 48.1: Telemundo; for others, see § Subchannels

Ownership
- Owner: Telemundo Station Group; (NBC Telemundo License LLC)

History
- First air date: November 18, 1984
- Former call signs: KASK-TV (1984–1989); KZIA (1989–1997); KMAZ (1997–2001); KTYO (2001–2004)
- Former channel numbers: Analog: 48 (UHF, 1984–2009); Digital: 47 (UHF, until 2019); Translator: K46DH 46; KTDO-LP 48 (UHF analog, until 2018)
- Former affiliations: Independent (1984–1987, 1990–1995); UPN (1995–1998)
- Call sign meaning: Telemundo

Technical information
- Licensing authority: FCC
- Facility ID: 36916
- ERP: 132 kW
- HAAT: 553 m (1,814 ft)
- Transmitter coordinates: 31°48′18.9″N 106°29′0.7″W

Links
- Public license information: Public file; LMS
- Website: www.telemundo48elpaso.com

KTDO (channel 48) is a television station licensed to Las Cruces, New Mexico, United States, broadcasting the Spanish-language Telemundo network to the El Paso, Texas, area. Owned and operated by NBCUniversal's Telemundo Station Group, the station has studios on Pellicano Drive in El Paso, and its transmitter is located atop the Franklin Mountains on the El Paso city limits.

Channel 48 first began broadcasting from Las Cruces as KASK-TV on November 18, 1984. It was owned alongside KASK radio and was an English-language independent station complete with local news for the Las Cruces area. It struggled financially and was put into receivership in September 1986; though the receiver sold the station, the new owner opted not to pursue reconstruction. Instead, it was acquired by Robert Muñoz and returned to the air in 1990 as KZIA. The station offered local and New Mexico news, but as with the first incarnation, the station failed economically and filed for bankruptcy protection in August 1992. It was purchased by Lee Enterprises, then-owner of Albuquerque's KRQE. In 1995, the station affiliated with UPN and moved its studios to east El Paso.

Beginning January 15, 1998, channel 48 became the new Telemundo station for Las Cruces and El Paso, as KMAZ and then as KTYO under Council Tree Communications ownership from 2001 to 2004. ZGS Communications bought the station in 2004, renamed it KTDO, and introduced its first Spanish-language local news department in 2010. The station became a Telemundo owned-and-operated outlet when ZGS's stations were purchased by the network in 2018. In the years that followed, the station expanded its news production and moved into its present studios.

== As an English-language station ==
=== KASK-TV ===
In 1983, the Federal Communications Commission (FCC) designated for comparative hearing three applications seeking to build new television stations in Las Cruces, New Mexico, from Doña Ana County Family Television; Las Cruces Family Television; and KASK Incorporated, the owner of Las Cruces radio station KASK (103.1 FM). The parties settled in October 1983, with KASK's application being the one granted. KASK-TV was announced to go on the air as an independent station and the city's first commercial TV outlet. The station was built on the ninth floor of the First National Bank Tower. KASK-TV began broadcasting on November 18, 1984. At launch, its schedule included daily news programming: a 7 p.m. news brief and a full 10 p.m. newscast, concentrating on news of southern New Mexico.

Despite having won a construction permit and put the station on the air, KASK-TV struggled to get a license to cover the permit because of its co-ownership with KASK radio. The station also struggled financially: in April 1986, the owners stated KASK-TV was losing $2,500 a month, and it was put on the market. A sale to an unnamed business group from Las Cruces was announced in September 1986. Former First National Bank vice president John Hoagland was approved as the new licensee in October; he had been approved as a receiver in a sealed legal case. The receivership had been agreed to avoid a bankruptcy proceeding in which the bank was the principal creditor. Hoagland agreed to sell the station to Roy Henderson of Houston in 1987. Ahead of the transaction closing, KASK-TV left the air on October 2, 1987, so it could execute a planned transmitter move and rebuild at higher power. Bayport received approval to build a 529-foot (161 m) tower at a site near Anthony, New Mexico, and increase power from 74,000 watts to the maximum 5 million. However, by late 1988, Henderson had abandoned attempts to put KASK-TV back on the air and was searching for a buyer.

=== KZIA ===
KASK-TV was put back into receivership, and in October 1989, the receiver filed to sell the station to Southwestern Broadcasting Company, owned by Carol and Robert Muñoz. The station's call sign was changed to KZIA, after the Zia symbol that is a state symbol of New Mexico. Muñoz, a former general manager for KCIK-TV in El Paso, aimed to provide local news coverage of Las Cruces and hoped to air New Mexico State Aggies athletics events; this included a 6:30 p.m. newscast, Newswatch, managed by former KDBC-TV newsman Bill Mitchell. Outside of local programming, KZIA broadcast comedies, dramas, and movies.

KZIA began broadcasting again on June 13, 1990; Muñoz announced on the first newscast that it had reached a deal for NMSU sports. The station was added to the El Paso cable system in 1991, giving it access to a wider potential audience. In addition to its own news, KZIA-TV initially offered a replay of KDBC's 6 p.m. newscast at 9:30 p.m. In March 1991, channel 48 began carrying by microwave link all of KOB-TV's local newscasts live from Albuquerque in a first-of-its-kind arrangement; three months later, the local newscast was dropped due to insufficient advertiser support. The six NMSU basketball games the station carried in 1990 lost KZIA significant money.

Muñoz put KZIA into bankruptcy reorganization in August 1992 to keep it on the air. At the time, he had been appointed as interim general manager of KCOS, El Paso's public TV station. He attributed the station's problems to an unexpected downturn in the economy and the impact of the Gulf War on advertising. The bankruptcy action followed the FCC dismissing a sale application to Two If By Sea Broadcasting Corporation of Seattle.

In March 1993, Lee Enterprises—owner of KRQE in Albuquerque—agreed to acquire KZIA. Lee agreed to pay $440,000, less than half the $900,000 price of the Two If By Sea purchase bid of 1992. Under Lee, KOB news was replaced by that of KRQE. The station began carrying New Mexico Lobos football and a local sports show, Las Cruces Sports Sunday. It also opened a translator on channel 46 to serve areas of Las Cruces that had previously received a poor signal.

KZIA became an affiliate of the United Paramount Network (UPN) when it launched in January 1995. Later that year, after a dispute with the city of Las Cruces over microwave dishes, KZIA relocated its studios from Las Cruces to east El Paso. The dishes were important for the station to have a line of sight to the transmitter.

== As a Telemundo station ==
Lee Enterprises decided in late 1997 to change the station from an English-language to a Spanish-language outlet. The call sign was changed to KMAZ in November 1997, and channel 48 affiliated with Telemundo beginning January 15, 1998. In making the change, management cited the ability to grow as the second Spanish-language station (after KINT-TV, channel 26, the Univision affiliate) in a major Hispanic market instead of the fifth or sixth outlet in a top-100 general market. KMAZ replaced XHIJ-TV (channel 44) of Ciudad Juárez as the area's Telemundo affiliate and was replaced by KJLF (channel 65), El Paso's affiliate of The WB, which began airing some UPN shows.

Lee put its broadcasting properties up for sale in 2000, deciding to focus on its publishing businesses. While Emmis Communications acquired the majority of Lee's broadcasting properties, KMAZ was not included in the sale; in January 2001, it was sold to Council Tree Hispanic Broadcasters of Longmont, Colorado. Council Tree had, in August 2000, purchased a 17-percent controlling stake in Telemundo, making channel 48 a network owned-and-operated station. The call sign was changed to KTYO in September 2001.

Council Tree sold its Telemundo stake to NBC in October 2001, but it retained channel 48 for another three years, making improvements to the station's signal. The station was sold to ZGS Broadcast Holdings for $11.8 million in 2004. The call sign was changed to KTDO effective October 1, 2004. Under ZGS, KTDO entered into direct competition with KINT-TV for news for the first time on November 16, 2010, when it debuted local 5 and 10 p.m. newscasts on weeknights.

On December 4, 2017, NBCUniversal's Telemundo Station Group announced its purchase of ZGS's television stations, including KTDO. The sale was completed on February 1, 2018. After the purchase, KTDO launched newscasts at 4 and 4:30 p.m. in June 2018. In 2023, NBC moved the station to a new building in El Paso.

== Technical information ==
=== Subchannels ===
KTDO's transmitter is located in the Franklin Mountains. The station's signal is multiplexed:

Subchannels of KTDO
Subchannel	Res.	Short name	Programming
48.1	1080i	KTDO-HD	Telemundo
48.2	480i	TELEXIT	TeleXitos
48.3	480i	CRIMES	NBC True CRMZ
48.4	480i	COZI	Cozi TV
48.5	480i	OXYGEN	Oxygen
14.2	480i	COMET	Comet (KFOX-TV)
14.3	480i	CHARGE!	Charge! (KFOX-TV)

Broadcast on behalf of another station

=== Analog-to-digital conversion ===
KTDO shut down its analog signal, over UHF channel 48, on June 12, 2009, the official digital transition date. The station's digital signal remained on its pre-transition UHF channel 47, using virtual channel 48. KTDO relocated its signal from channel 47 to channel 26 in 2020, as a result of the 2016 United States wireless spectrum auction.
