= Doubleday Broadcasting =

American radio and TV broadcasting company, 1967–1986

Doubleday Broadcasting was a wholly owned subsidiary of the publishing company Doubleday that owned and operated radio and television stations throughout the United States from 1967 to 1986. It grew from a handful of stations in medium and smaller markets to operating three AM stations and seven FM stations, the maximum allowed by the Federal Communications Commission at the time.

== Origins ==
Doubleday Broadcasting was a wholly owned subsidiary of the publishing company Doubleday. In 1967, it acquired the radio and television properties of Texas-based Trigg-Vaughn Stations. The $14 million purchase included three television stations and seven radio stations: (Note: Trigg-Vaughn retained ownership of radio station KOSA, Odessa, Texas.)

- KOSA-TV, Odessa-Midland, Texas
- KROD AM-TV, El Paso, Texas
- KITE AM-FM, San Antonio-Terrell Hills, Texas
- KDTV, Dallas, Texas (unbuilt)
- KRNO, San Bernardino, California
- KHOW, Denver, Colorado
- KDEF AM-FM, Albuquerque, New Mexico

Founder Cecil L. Trigg continued to direct the enterprise as president of Doubleday Broadcasting, but resigned in November 1967.

== Initial expansion ==
In early 1968, Doubleday began to make changes in the company's line-up of stations. It acquired KMYR of Denver for $101,000 to pair with KHOW. The call sign was changed to KHOW-FM and later KXKX, followed by KPKE.

In May 1968, Doubleday bought KITE, KITE-FM, KROD, and KRNO, evincing a determination to focus on larger markets. In June 1969, David G. Scribner, then vice president and general manager of KITE AM-FM, was named president of the company. Scribner had joined the Trigg-Vaughn group in 1957 and rose through the ranks to become vice-president of radio, and after the Doubleday acquisition, general manager of KITE.

During Scribner's tenure, the company's parent created two subsidiaries as adjuncts to the broadcasting enterprise: broadcast brokerage firm Doubleday Media and Doubleday Advertising.

In the spring of 1971, Doubleday acquired the station KRIZ of Phoenix, Arizona, for $1 million from John L. Wheeler and James Manning.

In January 1973, Doubleday acquired KDWB of Saint Paul, Minnesota, from Valjon for $3.25 million. In April 1973, Doubleday sold KDEF AM-FM and KROD to Desert Horizons, a subsidiary of the publicly owned Media Horizons group for $1,250,000. In September 1973, Doubleday sold KOSA-TV to Forward Communications of Texas for $2.25 million. By year's end, Doubleday donated KDTV to Christian Broadcasting Network through a gift of stock valued at $2 million.

== Corporate changes and further expansion ==
In April 1974, Gary Stevens, vice president and general manager of KRIZ, was appointed vice president and general manager of KDWB. Two years later, he was promoted to senior vice president for research and development of Doubleday Broadcasting. In December 1977, Stevens replaced David Scribner as president of Doubleday Broadcasting. (Note: Scribner bought KIDN, Pueblo, Colorado, in November 1979, for $780,000.)

In April 1974, Doubleday applied to the Federal Communications Commission (FCC) to acquire the license of KWK in St. Louis, Missouri, from bankruptcy trustee Curtis L. Mann for $630,000 as part of its continued expansion. Government approval of the acquisition was delayed until August 1976, pending grant of the KWK license renewal application and removal of a competing application to operate on the frequency.

In September 1974, Doubleday sold KDBC-TV (formerly KROD-TV) to Portal Communications, a subsidiary of Evening Post Publishing, for $5 million. With this, Doubleday exited the television market. In July 1976, Doubleday acquired an FM companion to KDWB from Fairchild Minnesota for $800,000: WYOO-FM, licensed to the Twin Cities suburb of Richfield, Minnesota. The call sign was changed to KDWB-FM. In July 1978, Doubleday sold KRIZ to Family Life Broadcasting System for $700,000. In October 1978, Doubleday sold its San Antonio stations: KITE was sold to Lone Star Radio for $750,000. KITE-FM was sold to Lotus Texas for $750,000.

In February 1979, Doubleday acquired an FM companion to KWK from Charles H. Norman for $2 million: WGNU-FM, licensed to Granite City, Illinois. The call sign was changed to WWWK, and later, KWK-FM. (Note: Doubleday engaged in a protracted legal battle for the call sign "KWK-FM", to align with KWK. The FCC declined to grant the call sign change on the grounds that Granite City was not contiguous to St. Louis, since it was located across the Mississippi River, the K/W call sign demarcation. The federal appellate court reversed the FCC, noting the Commission had granted many similar exceptions to the rule in the past.) In July 1980, Doubleday acquired WBFG of Detroit from Trinity Broadcasting for $8.25 million, a record price for an FM station. The company hailed the purchase as a first step of an asserted effort to double the size of its broadcast holdings, aiming at the top ten media markets. The call sign was changed to WLLZ. In December 1981, Doubleday sold KHOW to Metromedia for $15 million. This marked the sale of the last of the original Trigg-Vaughn stations. Also in December 1981, Doubleday acquired WAVA-FM, Arlington, Virginia, from WAVA for $8 million. In March 1982, Doubleday acquired WTFM of Lake Success, New York, from Friendly Frost for $8.7 million. The call sign was changed to WAPP.

== Multiple ownership ==
In October 1982, Doubleday petitioned the FCC to revise its ownership regulations, which limited a single broadcaster to owning a maximum of seven AM, seven FM, and seven TV stations. Doubleday proposed that the Commission modify the rule to permit ownership of 14 radio stations, whether AM or FM. Broadcasting magazine took an editorial position in favor of the proposal, contending, "The rule of seven never made any sense. It attaches the same value and influence to seven stations in the seven biggest markets and seven stations in the seven smallest." In July 1984, the Commission instead relaxed its limits to permit ownership of up to 12 stations in each service.

== Program syndication ==
In April 1983, Doubleday, in conjunction with the Mutual Broadcasting System, launched the syndicated weekly radio album-oriented rock magazine "Rock USA", which, within two months, was carried on more than 100 stations nationwide. The three-hour program originated in the WAPP studios and was delivered via satellite. Mutual pulled the plug on the program in early 1984 due to apparent poor clearance in major markets.

== Final expansion ==
In April 1983, Doubleday acquired WMET of Chicago from Metromedia for $9.5 million. This was the company's seventh FM station acquisition, maxing out FM station ownership under FCC regulations. At this zenith of Doubleday's expansion efforts into major market radio, its lineup was:

Doubleday FM Markets
Rank	City	Station
#1	New York	WAPP
#3	Chicago	WMET
#8	Detroit	WLLZ
#10	Washington DC	WAVA
#14	Minneapolis-St. Paul	KDWB-FM
#17	St. Louis	KWK-FM
#18	Denver	KPKE

Doubleday's two AM stations, KDWB and KWK, rounded out the company's portfolio. Citing underperformance, Doubleday sold KWK and KWK-FM to Robinson Broadcasting in February 1984 for $4.5 million.

In January 1985, Doubleday acquired WHN of New York City from the Mutual Broadcasting System to pair with its WAPP. The $13 million price tag was the largest standalone AM sale of the year. It was the company's final acquisition. In May 1985, Doubleday announced its plans to relocate WHN and WAPP to the historic Kaufman Astoria Studios in Queens.

== Decline ==
In November 1985, Doubleday agreed to sell four of its stations to a new entity headed by Robert Sillerman for $27 million to help reduce the debt of its parent company. (Note: Doubleday acquired a controlling interest in the New York Mets in 1980 for a record price of $21.1 million. The team was losing money, an estimated $1 million in 1982 alone.) The deal included KDWB AM-FM, WLLZ, and KPKE. That same month, it agreed to sell WMET to World Class Communications for $12.5 million.

In January 1986, Gary Stevens left Doubleday to become the first vice president of financial firm Wertheim & Co., focusing on mergers and acquisitions in the communications sector. In February 1988, he left Wertheim to form his own brokerage firm, Gary Stevens & Company.

In March 1986, Doubleday agreed to sell WHN, WAPP, and WAVA to Emmis Broadcasting for a total of $53 million, broken down as $15 million for WHN, $21 million for WAPP, and $17 million for WAVA. The deal closed five months later. Emmis changed the WAPP call sign to WQHT. The sale represented Doubleday's exit from radio broadcasting.

David Scribner died in 1984 at age 58. In December 1986, Doubleday was acquired by West German publishing company A.G. Bertelsmann. (Note: The sale did not include the New York Mets, which, earlier in the year, had been sold to Nelson Doubleday Jr., and Fred Wilpon.) Gary Stevens died in 2025 at age 84.
