= James Kirchick =

American journalist (born 1983)

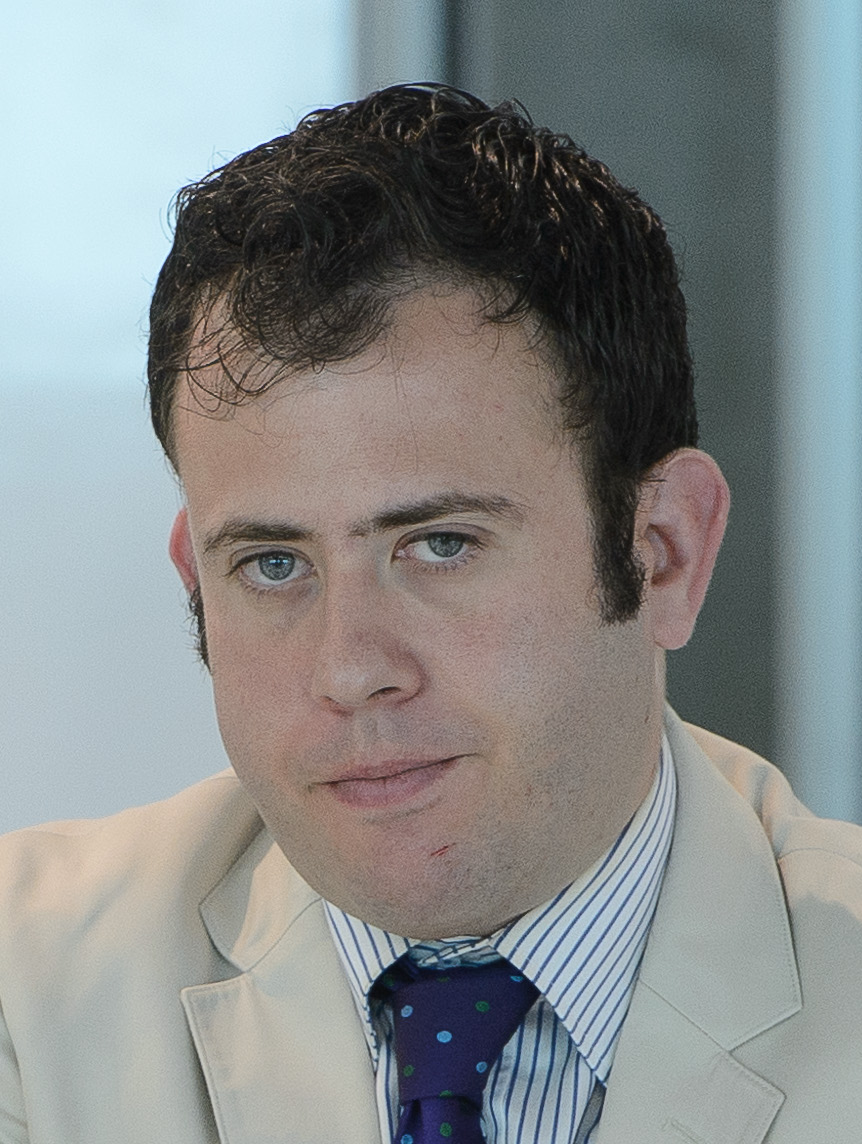
- Kirchick in 2015
- Born: 1983 (age 42–43); Boston, Massachusetts, U.S.
- Education: Yale University
- Occupation: Journalist

James Kirchick (/ˈkɜːrtʃɪk/; born 1983) is an American reporter, foreign correspondent, author, and columnist. He has been described as a conservative or neoconservative.

== Career ==
Born in Boston, Kirchick was raised in a Jewish family and attended Yale University, where he wrote for its student newspaper, the Yale Daily News.

For over three years, Kirchick worked at The New Republic, covering domestic politics, intelligence, and American foreign policy. Later, he was writer-at-large for Radio Free Europe/Radio Liberty based in Prague.

Kirchick has worked as a reporter for The New York Sun, the New York Daily News, and The Hill, and has been a columnist for the New York Daily News and the Washington Examiner. He has received the National Lesbian and Gay Journalists Association Excellence in Student Journalism Award and the Journalist of the Year Award. Kirchick was previously a fellow for the think tank Foreign Policy Initiative. As the Foreign Policy Initiative was shutting down in 2017, Kirchick announced that he would be moving to the Brookings Institution in Washington. His role at Brookings was as a visiting fellow.

Kirchick has written for The Atlantic since 2008. In July 2026, he was hired as a contributing writer for the magazine. Kirchick left The Atlantic in November 2026 following the midterm elections, amid staff uproar about his anti-Muslim rhetoric.

=== Ron Paul newsletters ===
In 2008, Kirchick wrote about newsletters that contained homophobic, conspiratorial and racist material, published under the name of Texas Congressman and Republican presidential candidate Ron Paul. The story again became prominent in the 2012 presidential election.

It was later claimed by television station WXIX that Ron Paul was not the author of the newsletter segments which contained the material in question. In their second newscast on the scandal in January 2012, based on information provided by Lew Rockwell, who had also worked on the newsletter, WXIX's Reality Check claimed that the offending articles may have been written by one of the freelance writers who were said to have been employed at the time.

Erik Wemple for The Washington Post wrote an article that included Kirchick's response to WXIX's second newscast, where Kirchick implied that the writer of the WXIX article, Ben Swann, was incorrect in his naming of the supposed writer of the "Special Edition on Racial Terrorism".

Ron Paul did not initially deny authorship of the offending material, though he had begun denying it by 2001. He has accepted responsibility for the content regardless of its author, as it was published under his name.

=== August 2013 RT appearance ===
Immediately after U.S. Army soldier Chelsea Manning's July 30, 2013 court-martial conviction of, among other charges, violations of the Espionage Act, Kirchick wrote in the Daily News that Manning was "lucky not to be headed to the electric chair." On August 21, on RT (formerly Russia Today), he participated in a live panel awaiting Manning's sentencing, Kirchick refused to discuss Manning, instead protesting the Russian LGBT propaganda law. When asked if he was ready to have a conversation about Manning with the assembled panel, Kirchick retorted angrily: "RT has been Bradley Manning and Edward Snowden 24/7. I haven't seen anything on your network about the anti-gay laws that have been passed in Russia and the increasing climate of violence and hostility towards gay people." One of the program's hosts objected, saying they had a panel discussing it only the day before and after refusing to follow the course of discussion set by RT, Kirchick's video link was taken off air.

Later that day, Politico reached out to both Kirchick and RT for comment. Kirchick called for a "boycott" of RT, calling its employees "not journalists, they're propagandists". RT responded in an e-mail, calling Kirchick's protest "unrelated to the subject of the panel. Regretfully, RT had no other recourse but to continue the discussion without him". The Washington Post PostPartisan blogger Jonathan Capehart commended Kirchick for his "heroic" action; The New Republic's Julia Ioffe praised Kirchick's "trolling of RT"; and the next day, The Washington Post published Kirchick's opinion piece titled "Why I ambushed Russia's news network with rainbow suspenders." In it, Kirchick further denounced RT as broadcasting "sophisticated conspiracy theories and anti-establishment attitudes to push a virulently anti-American and illiberal agenda", while relying on "a pool of talking heads, including 9/11 truthers, anti-Semites, and other assorted extremists, who espouse the sort of views found where the far left and the far right converge". A day later, MSNBC host Lawrence O'Donnell invited Kirchick onto his show where they discussed related concerns and controversies at the 2014 Winter Olympics in Russia.

=== 2016 presidential elections ===
Kirchick supported Democratic Party candidate Hillary Clinton over the Republican Party candidate Donald Trump for the presidency during the 2016 presidential elections. He described Trump as a "brashly authoritarian populist" and Clinton as "not only … the obvious choice for those who don't want to see our country degenerate into a banana republic, she's the clear conservative choice as well."

On August 15, 2016, Kirchik wrote an article for The Daily Beast which described Jill Stein, Rania Khalek, Corey Robin, Glenn Greenwald, Ishaan Tharoor, Katrina vanden Heuvel, and others as "Hillary Clinton-Loathing, Donald Trump-Loving Useful Idiots of the Left". Ben Norton, writing for the Salon website, enquired to those mentioned in the article and received responses from them, 13 of the 14 indicated they would not be voting for Trump. The exception, Christopher Ketcham, claimed to vote for him not because he "loves" or "admires" him, but precisely because he says the GOP nominee "is an ignorant, vicious, narcissistic, racist, capitalist scumbag, and thus an accurate representative of the United States."

== Political views ==
=== LGBTQ rights ===
In several articles, Kirchick argues that gay rights activists in the United States have achieved their goals. Kirchick's critics argue that he separates the transgender rights movement from LGBTQ movements in making this evaluation.

At a 2025 symposium organized by Marty Peretz at the Center for Jewish History, Kirchick criticized transgender activists involved in pro-Palestinian protests in the United States as "crazy," "disturbing," and sick.

=== Zionism, Israel, and antisemitism ===
In his commentary and journalism, Kirchick has been a vocal supporter of Israel and has self-identified as a Zionist, arguing that individuals, both Jewish and non-Jewish, should unapologetically express support for a Jewish state. He frequently writes on issues related to antisemitism and Israel, defending the country against critics who accuse it of "pinkwashing" by pointing out its comparatively progressive record on LGBT rights within the Middle East. Following the 2023 October 7 attacks on Israel, Kirchick criticized what he described as a rising tide of antisemitism within elite institutions and the cultural landscape, writing an essay for The New York Times about a censorious "chill" affecting Jewish and pro-Israel authors within the publishing industry.

=== Islam ===
In 2014, Kirchick argued that Islamophobia in Europe is not on the same level as antisemitism.

During the 2026 United States elections, Kirchick drew attention for his Islamophobic tweets. In an October 2026 piece for Commentary, Kirchick called for stripping British-American journalist Mehdi Hasan of his American citizenship. He also accused Michigan senate candidate Abdul El-Sayed of being on the "Qatari payroll", and said of Wajahat Ali's commentary on what El-Sayed's election results would mean, "only thing missing from this is an 'Allahu Akbar' at the end." He later said that El-Sayed "isn't the only Islamist running in this election" and encouraged his followers to read an Atlantic article about "the slippery Adam Hamawy".

== Personal life ==
Kirchick is married to Josef Palermo, former curator of the Kennedy Center.

== Books ==
- The End of Europe: Dictators, Demagogues, and the Coming Dark Age Yale University Press, 2017.
- Secret City: The Hidden History of Gay Washington. New York: Henry Holt and Company. 2022. ISBN 9781627792325. OCLC 1293451114. On LGBT culture in Washington, D.C.

== Awards ==
- 2006 - National Lesbian and Gay Journalists Association Excellence in Student Journalism
- 2007 - National Lesbian and Gay Journalists Association Journalist of the Year
