= Micah Johnson (journalist) =

American journalist

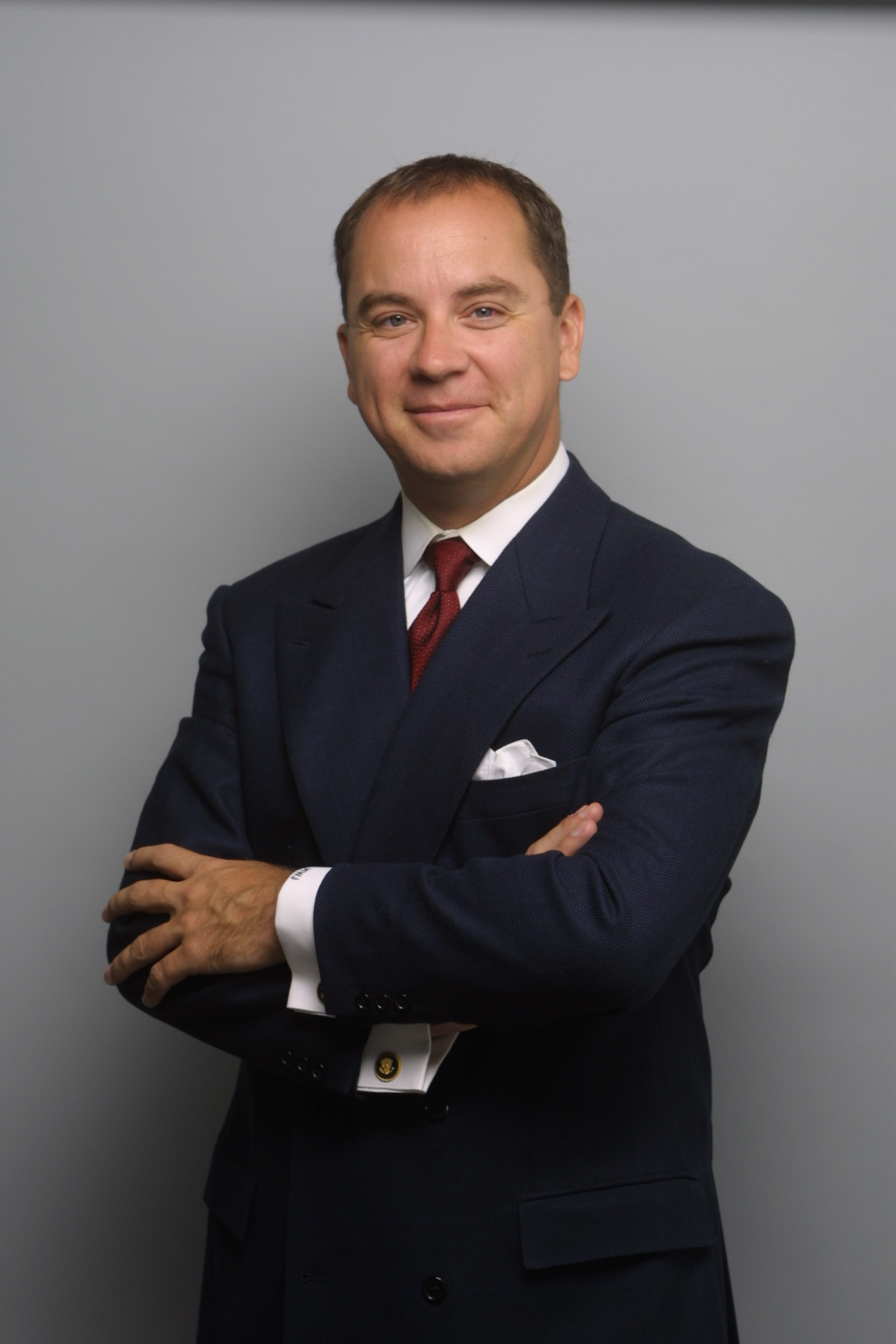
- Born: July 23; Pittsburgh, Pennsylvania
- Education: Indiana University of Pennsylvania
- Occupations: Television Agent, Former Police Officer
- Website: MediaStars Worldwide

Micah Johnson (born July 23 in Pittsburgh, Pennsylvania) is an American broadcast journalist. He is the Chief Executive Officer of Entegy Group - MediaStars Worldwide, headquartered in Phoenix, Arizona. In 1986, Johnson became one of the youngest male anchors at CNN Cable News Network in Atlanta, Georgia. At the network, he anchored Headline News, CNN Radio, and was one of the primary voices of CNN, including Larry King Live.

== On-Air Career ==
Johnson started his on-air career as a disc jockey at WLEM Radio in Emporium, Pennsylvania at the age of 16. His first television job came at WSEE-TV in Erie, Pennsylvania. Johnson went to WVVA in Bluefield, West Virginia as primary anchor before being hired at CNN in 1986. In 1990 Johnson moved to NBC in Washington where he anchored morning drive on the NBC Radio Network.

== Management career ==
Johnson briefly moved into politics as senior producer of radio and television in the United States Senate Republican Conference. From there he held the position of news director at KTSM-TV in El Paso, Texas, WTOV-TV in Steubenville, Ohio/Wheeling, West Virginia, WBRE-TV in Wilkes-Barre/Scranton, Pennsylvania, WPXI-TV in Pittsburgh, Pennsylvania, and WVIT-TV in Hartford, Connecticut. In 2002, Johnson joined the Meredith Corporation as Vice president of News Operations - overseeing the broadcast group's 14 television stations. He also created and oversaw Meredith's Washington, DC Bureau.

While at Meredith, Johnson recruited entertainment personality Robin Leach to the television group and with him produced many specialty shows from the Billboard Music Awards, Country Music Awards, Grammys and original series Penthouse F. After Meredith, Johnson briefly partnered with Leach at KVTE-LP in an attempt to launch an all-Vegas television network. Johnson founded Entegy Group/MediaStars Worldwide which represents on-air talent, producers, writers, and hosts. In 2007, Johnson discovered shark expert Jimmy Hall and placed him on Discovery Channel's popular Shark Week series. In the middle of the shoot, Hall died in a tragic base jumping accident on Baffin Island in Canada.

== Education ==
He attended Indiana University of Pennsylvania studying Communications Media. Shortly thereafter, he was awarded the University's Distinguished Alumni Award. Johnson sits on the IUP Alumni Association's Board of Directors.

== Awards ==
Johnson is listed in Who's Who in America.

== Memberships ==
- Academy of Television Arts & Sciences
- Vice president for various Associated Press state boards.
- Governor - National Academy of Television Arts & Sciences - Rocky Mountain Region
- White House Correspondents' Association
- Radio-Television News Directors Association
- National Press Club (USA)
- Freemasonry
