= Border Report =

American news website

- Type: Online news website
- Owner(s): Nexstar Media Group
- Founded: 2019
- Website: borderreport.com

Border Report is an American news website owned by Nexstar Media Group. It was launched in the spring of 2019 and focuses on news reporting along the Mexico–United States border. At launch, its reporters included Sandra Sanchez, based in McAllen, Texas, and Julian Resendiz, a KTSM-TV reporter based in El Paso. News stories are published on the website and broadcast on Nexstar television stations across the border region.

In September 2021, while reporting for the Border Report on the Del Rio Bridge migrant surge in Texas, Sanchez was detained by Laughlin Air Force Base military police for 45 minutes after photographing signs outside the base's gates. In a live blog on the website, Sanchez said that military police claimed she had illegally entered federal property. Sanchez was later released without charges.

== Border Report Tour ==
The Border Report Tour, a ten-day project covering news stories along the Mexico–US border, launched in September 2019. The series was anchored by Sanchez, Resendiz, and Nexstar Washington D.C. correspondent Anna Wiernicki. The tour started in San Diego on September 22 and ended in Brownsville, Texas on October 1. According to Chris Berg, content development director at Nexstar, the mission of the tour project was to "provide a daily look at the lives of the people who live and work along the U.S.-Mexico border." News content created on the tour was broadcast on some Nexstar TV stations, particularly those in the Southwest, and via online streaming.

== Reception ==
Writing in the Columbia Journalism Review, Meaghan Winter described Border Report as having a clear mission for its journalists, contrasting with the guiding principle that Nexstar passes down to station managers—"commitment to localism"—which Winter describes as "amorphous and lackluster". Winter further noted that Border Report was able to reach more viewers than a single local newspaper or TV station could, by having its stories air on various TV stations near the border.
