= KXPL =

Radio station in El Paso, Texas

- El Paso, Texas; United States
- Frequency: 1060 kHz
- Branding: Éxtasis Digital 1060 AM

Programming
- Languages: Spanish, English
- Format: English-language classic hits

Ownership
- Owner: Radiorama; (New Radio System, Inc.)

History
- First air date: July 13, 1972
- Last air date: February 28, 2022
- Former call signs: KAMA (1972–1985); KFNA (1985–2000)

Technical information
- Facility ID: 33067
- Class: D
- Power: 10,000 watts day
- Transmitter coordinates: 31°48′41″N 106°31′53″W

KXPL (1060 AM) was a radio station licensed to El Paso, Texas, United States. The station was owned by New Radio System, Inc., a United States corporation operating the station on behalf of Mexican radio station operator Radiorama, which had a partial ownership stake.

The station had been silent since June 30, 2020, for economic reasons.

== History ==
=== KAMA ===
Jack R. McVeigh received a construction permit for a new 10,000-watt, daytime-only radio station in El Paso on August 20, 1971. KAMA signed on July 13, 1972; it was one of the affiliates of the short-lived Mutual Spanish Network and was the only Spanish-language station based in El Paso. January 1, 1976, brought the launch of an FM counterpart, KAMA-FM 93.1, also broadcasting in Spanish with salsa and tropical music. KAMA was a highly successful station in the second half of the 1970s, leading the El Paso radio ratings in each year between 1975 and 1979.

McVeigh sold KAMA-AM-FM in 1981 to Thrash Broadcasting, Inc., of Georgia. Thrash flipped KAMA-FM to an English-language format as KAMZ "93Z" in April 1982.

In 1982, the Federal Communications Commission made available the 750 kHz frequency for use in the El Paso area. Unlike at 1060, a clear channel frequency assigned to Mexico City's XEEP-AM, a station on 750 could broadcast at night. Thrash made a bid for the new license, which had four applicants. In 1985, one went bankrupt, and the remaining three reached an agreement by which Thrash would win the 750 frequency in a merger with the El Paso Radio Corporation. Competitor Fina Broadcast House Corporation—owned by El Paso Spanish-language radio pioneer John S. Chávez, Jr., whose KOYE was the first Spanish-language radio station in El Paso—bought the 1060 license from Thrash.

=== KFNA ===
At 5:30 p.m. on July 11, 1985, KAMA moved to 750 AM. Two months later, on September 16, the new 1060 station began operation as KFNA "Radio Fina", with a Spanish-language oldies format playing music of the 1940s, 1950s and 1960s. The format failed to attract listeners; less than 18 months after launching, Fina filed for bankruptcy protection, declaring $377,000 in assets to $716,000 in liabilities and with several court judgments against the company; a search for a buyer began.

It would be some time before the bankruptcy case was resolved. In November 1990, the court-appointed trustee for Fina Broadcast House filed to sell KFNA—by then silent—to K-Fina Results, Inc., a company owned by Roberto Corral, Armando de León, Jr., Aida Mangas de Otañez, and Enriqueta Gómez; Mangas was a resident of Ciudad Juárez, while the other three were El Paso investors. In January 1993, the station began broadcasting the audio of CNN Headline News. However, after a year of lackluster results, the station abruptly returned to Spanish in January 1994 as "Radio del Norte", laying off a dozen staffers in the process.

=== KXPL ===
On January 3, 2000, KFNA became KXPL; the station was known as Radio Sol.

The station was sold in 2004 to New Radio System, Inc., which was owned by Gómez alongside Paul Gregg, María Elena Lazo, and Adrián Pereda Gómez, one of the principals in Mexican radio broadcaster Grupo Radiorama, which owns several stations in Ciudad Juárez. Later that year, the station was an affiliate of W Radio.

The station held a number of formats in the 2010s. As late as 2017, it was a news/talk outlet known as "Latina 1060 AM"; programming included news, talk and entertainment shows. The next year, it became Éxtasis Digital, using a common Radiorama brand and an English-language adult contemporary format. The station continued to broadcast until June 30, 2020, at which time it went silent temporarily due to economic reasons stemming from the COVID-19 pandemic.

The station returned to the air in 2021, but left the air again on February 28, 2022, this time for good. New Radio System surrendered KXPL's license to the Federal Communications Commission on February 23, 2023; the FCC canceled it the same day.
