= KPRR =

Radio station in El Paso, Texas

Coordinates: 31.793°N 106.480°W

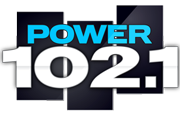
- El Paso, Texas; United States
- Broadcast area: El Paso metropolitan area
- Frequency: 102.1 MHz (HD Radio)
- Branding: Power 102.1

Programming
- Format: Rhythmic contemporary
- Subchannels: HD2: Hot 93.5 (Rhythmic oldies, classic hip hop)

Ownership
- Owner: iHeartMedia, Inc.; (iHM Licenses, LLC)
- Sister stations: KHEY, KHEY-FM, KTSM, KTSM-FM

History
- First air date: December 5, 1969; 56 years ago (as KIZZ-FM)
- Former call signs: KIZZ-FM (1969–1972); KLOZ (1972–1986)
- Call sign meaning: PRR sounds like Power

Technical information
- Facility ID: 68688
- Class: C
- ERP: 100,000 watts horizontal polarization 66,000 watts vertical
- HAAT: 363 meters (1,191 ft)
- Translator: HD2: 93.5 K228FH (Montoya)

Links
- Webcast: FM/HD1: Listen Live; HD2: Listen Live
- Website: FM/HD1: kprr.iheart.com HD2: hotelpaso.iheart.com

KPRR (102.1 FM "Power 102.1"), is a commercial radio station in El Paso, Texas. The station is owned by iHeartMedia, Inc. and airs a rhythmic contemporary radio format. It offers a more broad-based direction in its playlist than most other rhythmic stations, with a mix of R&B/Hip-Hop, Dance, Hurban and Rhythmic Pop fare. KPRR has its studios and offices on North Mesa Street (Texas State Highway 20).

KPRR broadcasts from a transmitter in the Franklin Mountains. Its signal covers parts of Texas, New Mexico and the Mexican state of Chihuahua, including Ciudad Juárez. KPRR's studios are located along Mesa Drive in West Central El Paso. KPRR is one of two contemporary hit stations in the El Paso-Juárez radio market, with 104.3 XHTO-FM as the other.

KPRR broadcasts in the HD Radio format. Its HD2 signal carries a Rhythmic Oldies/Classic Hip Hop radio format known as "Hot 93.5." It is also heard on 99 watt FM translator K228FH at 93.5 MHz.

== History ==
The station signed on as KIZZ-FM on December 5, 1969. It was owned by Sunland Broadcasting Company and was the FM counterpart to AM 1150 KIZZ (now KHRO). KIZZ-FM was powered at 27,000 watts, a third of its current output.

In 1972, the call sign was changed to KLOZ. It called itself "K102," and offered a country music format. Mesa Radio bought it in 1975, followed by Jalapeno Broadcasting Company in 1979.

In 1986, the station was acquired by Transcontinental Broadcasting. In September of that year, it switched its call letters to become KPRR with a format patterned after popular Los Angeles rhythmic station KPWR. The move proved successful, with "Power 102" often leading the El Paso radio market in the ratings.

San Antonio-based Clear Channel Communications acquired KPRR in 1996. Clear Channel later became iHeartMedia, the current owner.
