= KHEY-FM =

Radio station in El Paso, Texas

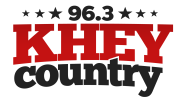
- El Paso, Texas; United States
- Broadcast area: El Paso metropolitan area
- Frequency: 96.3 MHz (HD Radio)
- Branding: 96.3 K-Hey Country

Programming
- Format: Country
- Affiliations: Premiere Networks

Ownership
- Owner: iHeartMedia, Inc.; (iHM Licenses, LLC)
- Sister stations: KHEY; KPRR; KTSM; KTSM-FM

History
- First air date: August 1, 1974 (as KEZB)
- Former call signs: KEZB (1974–1981)
- Call sign meaning: "Hey!"

Technical information
- Licensing authority: FCC
- Facility ID: 65963
- Class: C
- ERP: 88,000 watts; 100,000 with beam tilt
- HAAT: 424 meters (1,391 ft)
- Transmitter coordinates: 31.797°N 106.482°W

Links
- Public license information: Public file; LMS
- Webcast: Listen live (via iHeartRadio)
- Website: khey.iheart.com

KHEY-FM (96.3 MHz) is a commercial radio station in El Paso, Texas. It airs a country music radio format and is owned by iHeartMedia, Inc. The station carries the syndicated Bobby Bones Show on Monday through Saturday mornings, and After Midnight with Granger Smith overnight. The rest of the weekday schedule features local DJs. The studios and offices are on North Mesa Street (Texas State Highway 20) in West Central El Paso.

KHEY-FM has an effective radiated power (ERP) of 88,000 watts (100,000 with beam tilt). The transmitter is off Scenic Drive in the Franklin Mountains in El Paso. The signal covers parts of Texas, New Mexico and the Mexican state of Chihuahua, including Ciudad Juárez. KHEY-FM broadcasts in the HD Radio hybrid format; the HD2 subchannel formerly carried a 24 hour replay of Bobby Bones Country Top 30. The HD2 subchannel has since been turned off.

== History ==
=== KEZB ===
On August 1, 1974, the station signed on as KEZB. It was the FM counterpart of KHEY (690 AM). KEZB, as the call sign indicated, played easy listening or beautiful music, while KHEY played country music.

KEZB and KHEY were owned by KHEY, Inc., with studios on North Piedras Street. KEZB was a rare radio station in that era, in having a female program director, Karen Linton.

=== Switch to country ===
As the 1970s ended, as more people were acquiring FM radios, management decided to extend the successful country format on the AM station over to the FM dial. In 1981, KEZB switched its call letters to KHEY-FM. An FM station on 93.9 (today KINT-FM) quickly picked up the KEZB call sign and beautiful music format.

The new KHEY-FM simulcast some of the AM station's programming, but for most of the day, it was more music-intensive. KHEY (AM) carried world and national news each hour from the ABC Information Radio Network, while KHEY-FM tried to minimize non-music elements. In addition, KHEY-FM had its own program director, and for most of the day, the station had different disc jockeys.

=== Ownership changes ===
In 1990, KHEY-AM-FM were bought by U.S. Radio L.P. for $8,425,000. U.S. Radio ended the overnight simulcast of Y-96, with KHEY (AM) airing separate programming from 24/7 Networks. KHEY (AM) also aired some sports, including University of Texas football.

In 1998, KHEY-AM-FM were sold again, this time to San Antonio-based Clear Channel Communications. The price tag for the two stations was $10,500,000. Clear Channel also owned KTSM (1380 AM) and KTSM-FM. It switched the two AM stations, with KTSM and its talk radio format going to 690 AM, while KHEY began broadcasting on 1380 AM, and became a sports radio station. Clear Channel was renamed iHeartMedia in 2014.
