= Patricio G. Espinoza =

American-Spanish journalist

Patricio G. Espinoza is an American-Spanish journalist. He has received six Lone Star Emmy Awards.

== Career ==
Most recently, Espinoza has served as a MMJ - Multimedia Journalist at ABC15 Arizona producing specialty assignment reports and human-centered stories covering immigration, injustice, and community triumphs among other enterprising reports. His work along the Arizona-Mexico border 48 Hours on The Border received a 2024 Rocky Mountain Emmy Award Nomination.

He served as the chief investigative reporter for Univision in Houston, Texas. During his time there, his investigative unit En Su Defensa ('In your defense') received ten Lone Star Emmy nominations and won four. In 2004, Espinoza received an award in the Specialty Assignment Reporter category, and the news story 'Election Immigrant Workers/Mayoral Candidate', which he produced, won in the Specialty Assignment Report category. In 2005, the piece "Trágica Jornada" ("Tragic Journey"), produced by Espinoza, won an Emmy in the Continuing Coverage category.

In 2006, changes in Spanish-language media such as the consolidation of local newscasts by Telemundo and Univision had an impact on Espinoza's career. He subsequently embraced independent digital journalism, launching his blog and news site, Espiblog.org. His solo multimedia coverage of Hurricane Ike in 2008, published through the site, won an Emmy for Advanced Media in 2009.

Espinoza currently serves an adjunct faculty at Arizona State University's Walter Cronkite School of Journalism and as an adjunct professor at Texas A&M University–San Antonio.

He is also a media adviser for Enlace, a bilingual student-run television program.

In 2020, Espinoza was named the Atwood Chair of Journalism at the University of Alaska Anchorage (UAA).

Espinoza runs the nonprofit journalism websites nuzGeeks.com and espiBlog.org.

He continues his work in public interest journalism at the forefront of new media and digital convergence. In recent years, he has led several digital journalism projects, including SA4Mayor.com, which covered the 2009 San Antonio mayoral race, and AlamoCityTimes.com, a community-driven news site named one of the Top 100 Pioneering Hyperlocals. The site covered local news in San Antonio, Texas, and featured contributions from local bloggers.

Espinoza is recipient of journalism fellowships including Poynter, McCormick and Knight Digital Fellowships.

In recognition of his contributions to journalism and the community, the City of Houston proclaimed May 19, 2004, as "Patricio G. Espinoza Day."

== See also ==
- KXLN-TV
