= KHEY (AM) =

Radio station in El Paso, Texas

- El Paso, Texas; United States
- Broadcast area: El Paso metropolitan area
- Frequency: 1380 kHz
- Branding: Fox Sports 1380

Programming
- Format: Sports radio
- Affiliations: Fox Sports Radio; Premiere Radio Networks

Ownership
- Owner: iHeartMedia, Inc.; (iHM Licenses, LLC)
- Sister stations: KHEY-FM; KPRR; KTSM; KTSM-FM

History
- First air date: August 22, 1929
- Former call signs: KTSM (1929–2000)
- Call sign meaning: "Hey!"

Technical information
- Licensing authority: FCC
- Facility ID: 67771
- Class: B
- Power: 5,000 watts (day); 500 watts (night)
- Transmitter coordinates: 31°45′26.4″N 106°22′34.9″W

Links
- Public license information: Public file; LMS
- Webcast: Listen live (via iHeartRadio)
- Website: khey1380.iheart.com

KHEY (1380 kHz) is an AM radio station in e El Paso, Texas, United States. The station is owned by iHeartMedia, Inc. The station is licensed to broadcast in HD radio, but does not currently broadcast in HD. KHEY airs sports radio programming from Fox Sports Radio

== History ==
KHEY, originally KTSM, is the oldest radio station in El Paso. On June 30, 1929, W. R. Bledsoe and W. T. Blackwood were issued a construction permit for KTSM by the Federal Radio Commission, with the station becoming fully licensed on August 6, 1929. Initially operated by the Tri-State Music Company, it made its debut broadcast on August 22, 1929. The original studios were in the historic Hotel Paso del Norte on Sheldon Court at South Santa Fe Street. At first, KTSM was powered at 100 watts, broadcasting on 1310 kilohertz, and sharing time with another El Paso station, WDAH. Eventually Tri-State owned both stations, and they were consolidated in 1940 with full time operation under the KTSM call sign, which now represents the words "Tri-State Media", after WDAH turned in its license for cancellation.

KTSM was an affiliate of the CBS Radio Network, airing its schedule of dramas, comedies, news, sports, soap operas, game shows and big band broadcasts during the "Golden Age of Radio".

In early 1940, KTSM moved to 1350 kHz. With the implementation of the North American Regional Broadcasting Agreement (NARBA) in 1941, the station was shifted to 1380 kHz. Daytime power was later increased to 1,000 watts, and 500 watts at night, when radio waves on the AM band travel farther.

=== TV and FM stations ===
In 1953, KTSM added a television station, Channel 9 KTSM-TV, the second TV outlet in El Paso. Because KTSM radio was a CBS affiliate, KTSM-TV also began carrying CBS TV shows. As network programming moved from radio to television in the 1950s, KTSM switched to a full service, middle of the road format, including popular adult music, news and sports.

In 1962, an FM station was added. KTSM-FM 99.9 began broadcasting with a beautiful music format, separate from the AM station. The FM transmitter was co-located with the TV tower.

=== News and talk ===
In 1975, NBC Radio established an all-news radio network known as the "News and Information Service" (NIS). KTSM was one of the stations to join NIS, while keeping its CBS News affiliation. The NIS network failed to gain enough affiliates and was discontinued at the end of 1977.

For several years, KTSM did its own all-news programming, using the services of CBS and NBC for world and national news, and a staff of local reporters for El Paso and Texas news. Over time, talk shows were added until KTSM became a talk radio station.

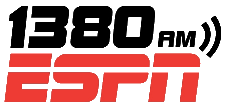
KHEY's logo under previous ESPN Radio affiliation

In 1998, San Antonio-based Clear Channel Communications acquired both KTSM-AM-FM and KHEY-AM-FM. Under Clear Channel management, the two AM stations' call signs and formats were swapped in 2000, with KTSM on AM 1380 becoming KHEY and inheriting its country music format, while KHEY on AM 690 became KTSM and inherited its talk format. KHEY later flipped to a sports radio format.
