= Estela Casas =

News anchor in El Paso, Texas, United States

Estela Casas (born 1961) is an American health advocate for cancer awareness and former news anchor in El Paso, Texas. She was part of the "longest running anchor team in El Paso television history." Casas is an inductee of the El Paso Women's Hall of Fame.

== Biography ==
Casas was born and raised in El Paso, Texas. She attended Arizona State University, where she studied voice performance, and later received a bachelor's degree from the University of Texas at El Paso (UTEP) in communications.

In 1986, she was working at KDBC, where she "spearheaded the Texas Breast Cancer Screening Project." Casas starting anchoring on KVIA-TV with Gary Warner in 1993. Casas has publicly and candidly shared medical procedures she underwent, including having a mammogram on television in 1993, and documenting her own experience with thyroid disease in 2010.

On January 7, 2020, Casas left her position at KVIA to work for the UMC Foundation.
