= KTSM-FM =

Radio station in El Paso, Texas

- El Paso, Texas; United States
- Broadcast area: El Paso metropolitan area - Las Cruces - Ciudad Juárez
- Frequency: 99.9 MHz (HD Radio)
- Branding: Sunny 99.9

Programming
- Format: Adult contemporary
- Subchannels: HD2: Beatles and Friends (oldies)
- Affiliations: Premiere Networks

Ownership
- Owner: iHeartMedia, Inc.; (iHM Licenses, LLC)
- Sister stations: KHEY; KHEY-FM; KPRR; KTSM

History
- First air date: June 18, 1962
- Call sign meaning: Tri-State Media (original owner)

Technical information
- Licensing authority: FCC
- Facility ID: 67762
- Class: C
- ERP: 100,000 watts
- HAAT: 555 meters (1,821 ft)
- Transmitter coordinates: 31°48′19″N 106°29′00″W

Links
- Public license information: Public file; LMS
- Webcast: Listen live (via iHeartRadio); HD2: Listen live (via iHeartRadio)
- Website: sunny999fm.iheart.com

KTSM-FM (99.9 MHz, "Sunny 99.9") is a commercial radio station in El Paso, Texas. It airs an adult contemporary radio format, switching to Christmas music for much of November and December. It is owned by iHeartMedia with studios and offices on North Mesa Street (Texas State Highway 20) in West Central El Paso. Sunny 99.9 carries several syndicated programs: Murphy, Sam & Jodi in morning drive time, Delilah's call-in and dedication show in evenings and Ellen K. on Saturday mornings.

The transmitter is located off Scenic Drive in El Paso, in the Franklin Mountains, at one of the highest sites in the state of Texas. The signal covers parts of Texas, New Mexico and the Mexican state of Chihuahua. KTSM-FM has an effective radiated power (ERP) of 100,000 watts, the maximum for most FM stations. KTSM-FM broadcasts using HD Radio technology. Its HD2 subchannel airs an oldies format known as "The Beatles and Friends."

== History ==
On June 18, 1962, KTSM-FM first signed on. It was the FM counterpart to KTSM (1380 AM), owned by the Tri-State Broadcasting Company, along with channel 9 on the television side. Tri-State referred to the states it covered, Texas, New Mexico and the Mexican state of Chihuahua. From the start, KTSM-FM was programmed separately from the AM station's middle of the road (MOR) format. KTSM-FM aired beautiful music, fifteen minute sweeps of instrumental cover versions of popular songs with minimal talk and news.

Over time, some vocals were added to the playlist. At first it was a few per hour. But as the station saw its audience's age increase, it made a move to give the station a younger feel by including some softer vocal songs from the Top 40. By 1990, the station had eliminated the easy listening instrumentals, completing its evolution to soft adult contemporary music. Some hours, it made use of the Transtar Radio Networks' "Format 41", a satellite-delivered soft AC service.

In 1998, San Antonio-based Clear Channel Communications bought KTSM-AM-FM as well as KHEY (690 AM) and KHEY-FM 96.3. Clear Channel had already acquired KPRR in 1996. Under Clear Channel management, KTSM-FM increased the tempo of its playlist, transitioning to a mainstream AC sound. In 2014, Clear Channel changed its name to iHeartMedia, Inc.
