= KDBC-TV =

Television station in El Paso, Texas

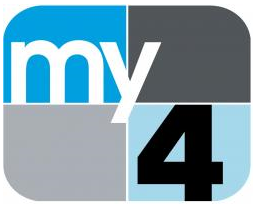
- El Paso, Texas; Las Cruces, New Mexico; United States
- City: El Paso, Texas
- Channels: Digital: 18 (UHF); Virtual: 4
- Branding: CBS 4; My 4.2

Programming
- Affiliations: 4.1: CBS; 4.2: MNTV/Roar; for others, see § Subchannels

Ownership
- Owner: Sinclair Broadcast Group; (KDBC Licensee, LLC)
- Sister stations: KFOX-TV

History
- First air date: December 14, 1952
- Former call signs: KROD-TV (1952–1973)
- Former channel number: Analog: 4 (VHF, 1952–2009)
- Former affiliations: All secondary: ABC and DuMont; (1952–1956); NTA (1956–1961)
- Call sign meaning: Doubleday Broadcasting Company

Technical information
- Licensing authority: FCC
- Facility ID: 33764
- ERP: 1,000 kW
- HAAT: 602 m (1,975 ft)
- Transmitter coordinates: 31°48′55″N 106°29′22″W

Links
- Public license information: Public file; LMS
- Website: cbs4local.com

KDBC-TV (channel 4) is a television station in El Paso, Texas, United States, affiliated with CBS and MyNetworkTV. It is owned by Sinclair Broadcast Group alongside Fox affiliate KFOX-TV (channel 14). The two stations share studios on South Alto Mesa Drive in northwest El Paso; KDBC-TV's transmitter is located atop the Franklin Mountains on the El Paso city limits.

KDBC-TV is El Paso's first and oldest television station. It began broadcasting as KROD-TV, owned alongside KROD radio and the El Paso Times newspaper, on December 18, 1952. In its early years, it aired programming from CBS, ABC, and the DuMont Television Network. Under owners including Trigg–Vaughn and Doubleday Broadcasting, the station produced a variety of local programming including an El Paso version of Bozo the Clown. When Doubleday sold KROD radio in 1973, channel 4 became KDBC-TV. Under the ownership of Portal Communications, a division of the Evening Post Publishing Company, KDBC was the number-one news station in El Paso.

Portal sold KDBC in 1985 to United Broadcasting, under whose ownership the market became more competitive. KDBC slipped into a distant third-place position during the 15-year ownership tenure of the Imes family. In this period, the station experienced frequent personnel turnover and was held back by corporate management that failed to connect with the needs of El Paso viewers. In 2000, Imes attempted to sell the station to Pappas Telecasting. Though Pappas's initial proposal to acquire the station and switch it to Spanish-language broadcasting failed to materialize, Pappas successfully bought KDBC-TV in 2003.

The ailing KDBC-TV ceased being a standalone entity in October 2009, when Titan TV Broadcast Group—an entity backed by Pappas's creditors in bankruptcy—outsourced many operations and services to competitor KTSM-TV. The stations shared resources including a newsroom. The arrangement was unwound when Sinclair concurrently acquired KDBC-TV and KFOX-TV in 2013. The two stations were integrated at their current location and KDBC reinforced with an expanded local news offering. In 2024, cutbacks at Sinclair reduced the station's news presence considerably.

== History ==
=== Early years ===
El Paso radio station KROD (600 AM), owned by the Roderick Broadcasting Company, was the third group to apply for a television station in El Paso, Texas. It applied for channel 4 in November 1950, amid a freeze on new station applications imposed by the Federal Communications Commission (FCC). KROD refiled in June 1952, after the freeze was lifted, and was granted the first construction permit for an El Paso station on July 31. Plans immediately were put into motion to build the station's studios, adjoining KROD radio on Wyoming Avenue, and a transmitter facility atop the Franklin Mountains, including a switchback road to the mountaintop site and a transmitter building made of the stone dislodged during blasting operations. The transmitter had been on order for a year and a half.

KROD-TV broadcast the first test pattern in El Paso on December 4, 1952, and regular programming began on December 14. It aired programs from CBS and the DuMont Television Network. The original signal broadcast on a temporary antenna before the mountaintop facility went into use nine days later. KROD-TV was the only television station in El Paso until KTSM-TV (channel 9) debuted on January 4, 1953, initially as an NBC and ABC affiliate. KROD-TV joined ABC as an affiliate in May 1953. DuMont ceased its existence as a network in 1955, and ABC programs moved to the new KILT (channel 13) in November 1956. That year, the station signed to become an affiliate of the NTA Film Network, a film distribution service.

The Roderick Broadcasting Company was merged with the El Paso Times newspaper, which Dorrance Roderick published, in 1953. Six years later, the KROD stations were sold for $3.45 million to Cecil Trigg and Jack Vaughn, the owners of KOSA-TV in Odessa and KVII-TV in Amarillo. Trigg-Vaughn sold its stations to the book publishing firm Doubleday and Company in a deal announced in October 1966 and completed in February 1967. The transaction marked Doubleday's expansion into broadcasting and created the Doubleday Broadcasting Co. subsidiary. Doubleday opted to sell KROD radio in 1972 and intended that the radio station keep the call sign. This necessitated a change for channel 4, which became KDBC-TV on May 29, 1973, in conjunction with the radio sale.

In its early years, KDBC produced a range of local programming. Martin Haines started at KROD-TV as a cartoon show host before becoming the station's news anchor between 1958 and 1974. The actress Lois Kibbee was a show host before leaving for New York to pursue her career. From 1968 into the 1970s, channel 4 had a local version of the franchised children's series Bozo the Clown. In El Paso, Bozo was Howell Eurich, who had previously served as a booth announcer and in other children's hosting roles. Eurich, who doubled as KROD-TV's promotions manager, also trained Bozos for other cities.

=== KDBC-TV: Evening Post and United ownership ===
Shortly after selling KROD radio, Doubleday agreed to sell KDBC-TV to Portal Communications—a subsidiary of the Evening Post Publishing Company of Charleston, South Carolina—in a transaction announced in November 1973 and completed in 1974. Under Portal, the news department became an increased focus. Roy Ortega, who worked at KDBC at the time, attributed KDBC with spurring improvements in newscasting in the market in the 1970s. Between 1975 to 1979, KDBC increased its news staff from 8 people to 20 and took the ratings lead from KTSM-TV, which had been until that time the news leader in El Paso. The news staff further grew to 30 people by 1982.

In later years, Eurich served as KDBC's weatherman, alongside his fourth wife, Gail Gordon, and a Lhasa Apso dog known as Puffy Little Cloud. The dog, who wore different costumes reflective of the weather, became a local celebrity and was featured in Texas Monthly magazine and the National Enquirer. Eurich and Gordon departed the station in 1981 in search of television work in other cities; he briefly returned to El Paso to work at KCIK-TV (channel 14) but, overcome by grief for his wife's deteriorating condition, committed suicide on November 3, 1982. His son Robin later became associated with the Chicago version of Bozo the Clown on WGN-TV.

During Portal's ownership, KDBC remained the El Paso news leader, attracting a third of the 6 and 10 p.m. audience to its local newscasts in February 1984. That year, the original tower was replaced by a new mast further north on Comanche Peak to broadcast KDBC and a new Spanish-language station, KINT-TV (channel 26).

After spinning out KDBC into a separate company, El Paso Broadcasting Company, Evening Post put the station on the market in August 1985 and agreed on a sale to United Broadcasting of Little Rock, Arkansas, in 1986. United agreed to sell its stations to ML Media in October 1987, only for the Black Monday stock market crash to cause ML's owner Merrill Lynch to sour on the idea of selling partnership units in the stations, leading to the deal's cancellation after two weeks.

During United's ownership, KDBC faced renewed competition in the El Paso news ratings. By 1985, KVIA-TV (channel 7, the former channel 13) and KTSM-TV were regularly battling KDBC for top news ratings at 6 and 10 p.m. For the next several years, all three stations were in close competition to lead in the news slots.

=== The Imes era ===
After the collapse of the ML Media deal, KDBC-TV was sold in 1988 to the Commercial Dispatch Publishing Company, owned by the Imes family of Columbus, Mississippi, for $33 million. KDBC became the company's largest station.

During Imes's ownership, KDBC-TV fell from competing for first place to being a distant third in news. In 1990 and 1991, the station was second behind KVIA. By 1993, it was in third place at 10 p.m. and tied for fourth or narrowly in fifth place, depending on the survey, with KINT at 6 p.m. During this time, the station experienced multiple and regular changes in leadership as well as budget cuts. From October 1990 to July 1991, KDBC laid off 13 employees, ending in the firing of general manager Gary Sotir. He was replaced by Stan Siegal, who also served as vice president of the Imes TV station group. In 1993, KDBC news anchor Estela Casas left after eight years to take the same position at the more popular KVIA.

In 1995, the Fox network made a heavy pitch in hopes of wooing KDBC-TV to switch affiliations from CBS and thereby upgrading from KFOX-TV, a UHF station, to a VHF station with an existing news department. Fox executives offered to buy a minority stake in the station from Imes if it changed affiliation. The network had recently won the rights to NFL football including the Dallas Cowboys and had programs with Hispanic appeal on its schedule. Instead, Imes renewed with CBS in exchange for compensation Variety's Joe Flint called "very high" for a market the size of El Paso. Siegal retired that year and was replaced by Jim Grimes, who had been the general manager of WIFR-TV in Rockford, Illinois. The station was relaunched under Grimes with a new news format and logo, to no avail in increasing viewership. Grimes was fired in March 1996.

The revolving door of management and news formats continued. The station hired new general managers in June 1996 and February 1997 with the hiring of former KTSM executive Dan Krieger. The state of the station was such that Frank Imes, the president of Imes Communications, was forced to spend more time in El Paso than usual. Several KTSM employees followed Krieger to KDBC, including anchor Raymond Mesa, and the station relaunched its newscasts as Channel 4 News that April. Later that year, former KVIA anchor Suzanne Michaels joined KDBC as the lead female co-anchor, and the station debuted a morning newscast and rebranded again as Action 4 News. The changes were not sufficient to lift KDBC out of third. In 2000, the station tried another new strategy by consolidating its two early evening newscasts at 5 and 6 p.m. into a single half-hour report at 5:30 p.m., moving the CBS Evening News to 5 p.m.

In the last 10 years, they haven't done well. They've tried. It wasn't from a lack of effort.

— Kevin Lovell, general manager, KVIA-TV, to the New Hampshire Union Leader in 2000

El Paso observers attributed the station's decline under Imes to a lack of understanding of the local community and viewership habits. El Paso Herald-Post columnist Charlie Edgren noted that Imes had a tendency to bring in "Back Easters" from Midwestern and Eastern markets who lacked the knowledge of El Paso that KVIA and KTSM had in upper management and staff. Former KDBC anchor Bill Mitchell, interviewed in 2012, noted that some of the changes introduced at KDBC were not accepted by viewers. Roy Ortega, another longtime El Paso broadcaster, noted, "What happened with Channel 4 is that you ended up having ownership from outside the city that came in and didn't have a good understanding of the community's diversity and demographics. ... They came in with the sole purpose of making money, not serving the community."

=== 2000 Pappas sale attempt ===
As early as 1998, rumors were circulating that Imes was interested in selling KDBC-TV. In March 2000, the company announced it had agreed to sell the station to Pappas Telecasting.

On September 8, 2000, Pappas announced it was forming a joint venture with Mexican broadcaster TV Azteca to launch Azteca América, a new Spanish-language TV network, and that KDBC-TV would be its new El Paso affiliate beginning in April 2001. Consequently, CBS would need to find a new El Paso affiliate, with KKWB-TV (channel 65) cited as a possible new home for the network by KDBC-TV's general manager. The deal left national advertisers reticent to buy time on KDBC-TV because they were unsure of the station's future plans.

The company intended to house network operations at KXTX-TV in Dallas, which the company was in the process of acquiring. It also had a deal to buy KZTV in Corpus Christi and KVTV in Laredo, both CBS affiliates. However, Pappas's plans for the network imploded. It reached an impasse in attempting to buy the Dallas station; the board of directors of the Corpus Christi and Laredo stations resolved that it had lost faith in the company; and it walked away from an attempt to buy a station in the New York City market. This reduced coverage caused analysts to be skeptical of the network's acceptance among national advertisers. Additionally, economic conditions soured, jeopardizing the high-yield debt market where the network was to have raised $300 million.

When the deal to buy KXTX was terminated on June 20, 2001, Imes took KDBC-TV off the market and announced it would remain a CBS affiliate. Three months later, KDBC laid off Michaels and cut back its news output by discontinuing weekend newscasts in favor of simulcasts of CNN Headline News, citing financial problems.

=== Pappas and Titan ownership ===
Imes still desired to sell KDBC-TV and reached another agreement with Pappas on November 17, 2003, to sell the station for $20 million. Pappas began operating KDBC under a time brokerage agreement that same day, with the sale closing on April 2, 2004. In 2006, KDBC acquired the MyNetworkTV affiliation for its second digital subchannel.

Pappas ailed financially in the Great Recession and filed for bankruptcy in 2008. Ten stations including KDBC-TV were ordered to be auctioned. The only bid made on the group came from New World TV Group, a firm formed by major creditor Fortress Investment Group.

On October 19, 2009, Communications Corporation of America (ComCorp), owner of KTSM-TV, entered into a shared services agreement with Titan TV for KTSM-TV to provide advertising sales and administrative services as well as some news resources for KDBC-TV. Titan retained KDBC's broadcast license. The agreement resulted in the firing of roughly half of KDBC's nearly 50 employees. During this era, the two stations shared a newsroom but branded separately and had dedicated newscasts with distinct news formats; KDBC was known as Local 4. In 2010, the anchor team seen on KDBC's newscasts began reading additional newscasts when ComCorp outsourced news presentation for KVEO-TV in Brownsville to El Paso.

=== Common operation with KFOX-TV ===
On April 23, 2013, Titan TV Broadcast Group filed with the FCC to sell KDBC and its low-power repeaters to Cunningham Broadcasting, a company with close ties to Sinclair Broadcast Group. Shortly after, Sinclair closed on its pending purchase of four TV stations including KFOX-TV from Cox Media Group. At the time, the FCC did not permit ownership of two of the four highest-rated TV stations in a market, but two Spanish-language stations—KINT-TV and KTDO—both rated ahead of KDBC-TV, and KFOX-TV was sixth in total-day ratings, leading to FCC approval for Sinclair to own both stations outright in a deal consummated on October 1, 2013.

The sale to Sinclair split KDBC from KTSM-TV, which was sold to Nexstar Broadcasting Group, and from much of the talent seen on KDBC's newscasts at the time, who were under contract to KTSM. At the time, KDBC-TV only had two dedicated staff members. Sinclair purchased a former movie theater on South Alto Mesa Drive, on the city's west side, to serve as a new studio for KDBC-TV and KFOX-TV. The company sought to build up KDBC with its own news set and sales representatives, bringing the cluster's payroll to 40 people. The new KDBC newscasts debuted on October 16, 2014. Among the news personalities on the relaunched KDBC was Lou Romano, a former KVIA sportscaster who had worked at KDBC prior to the Titan takeover.

On July 19, 2024, as part of cutbacks, Sinclair announced that most of KDBC's newscasts would end on August 5 and would be replaced by simulcasts of their KFOX counterparts. Only the 10 p.m. newscast remained in the short term, with Sinclair stating that a "reconceptualized" newscast would premiere on KDBC later in the year. El Paso Matters suggested that Sinclair planned to introduce its lifestyle-oriented ARC format, as it had done on some of its other stations. In November 2024, KDBC launched ARC El Paso, which airs as its noon and 10 p.m. newscasts on weekdays.

== Notable former on-air staff ==
- Estela Casas – news anchor, 1985–1993
- Sam Donaldson
- David Ono – news anchor, known as David Johnson at KDBC-TV
- Steve Savard – sports director, 1990–1992

== Technical information ==
=== Subchannels ===
KDBC-TV's transmitter is located atop the Franklin Mountains. The station's signal is multiplexed:

Subchannels of KDBC-TV
Subchannel	Res.	Short name	Programming
4.1	1080i	CBS	CBS
4.2	720p	ROAR	Roar and MyNetworkTV
4.3	480i	Antenna	Antenna TV
4.4	480i	Dabl	Dabl
14.4	480i	TheNest	The Nest (KFOX-TV)

Broadcast on behalf of another station

=== Analog-to-digital conversion ===
KDBC-TV shut down its analog signal, over VHF channel 4, on June 2, 2009. The early shutoff was due to a blown tube in the analog transmitter which was deemed too expensive to replace in the final days of analog operations. The early shutdown also allowed moving the digital antenna from the side to the top of the tower. The station's digital signal remained on its pre-transition UHF channel 18, using virtual channel 4.

=== Translator ===
The 4.1 and 4.2 subchannels of KDBC-TV as well as KFOX-TV 14.1 are rebroadcast in Las Cruces, New Mexico, by KCWF-LD (channel 14).
