= KTSM (AM) =

Radio station in El Paso, Texas

- El Paso, Texas; United States
- Broadcast area: El Paso metropolitan area
- Frequency: 690 kHz
- Branding: News Radio 690 KTSM

Programming
- Format: Talk radio
- Network: Fox News Radio
- Affiliations: Premiere Networks; Compass Media Networks; Westwood One

Ownership
- Owner: iHeartMedia, Inc.; (iHM Licenses, LLC)
- Sister stations: KHEY; KHEY-FM; KPRR; KTSM-FM

History
- First air date: January 1, 1948
- Former call signs: KXEP (1947); KEPO (1947–1957); KHEY (1957–2000)
- Call sign meaning: original owner of 1390 AM, Tri-State Music Company

Technical information
- Licensing authority: FCC
- Facility ID: 69561
- Class: B
- Power: 10,000 watts
- Transmitter coordinates: 31°58′11.4″N 106°21′16.9″W

Links
- Public license information: Public file; LMS
- Webcast: Listen live (via iHeartRadio)
- Website: ktsmradio.iheart.com

KTSM (690 AM) is a commercial radio station licensed to El Paso, Texas. It is owned by iHeartMedia, Inc. and airs a talk format. The studios are on North Mesa Street at West Waymore Drive in west central El Paso.

KTSM broadcasts with 10,000 watts around the clock. Because the station operates on 690 AM, a Mexican and Canadian clear-channel frequency, KTSM uses a directional antenna with a four-tower array to avoid interfering with other stations operating on the same frequency. Its transmitter site is located off O'Brian Street near U.S. Route 54 in north east El Paso.

== Programming ==
KTSM weekday schedule is made up of the standard Premiere Networks nationally syndicated conservative talk schedule, with little local programming outside news and weather updates and Fox News Radio at the top of the hour. This includes Your Morning Show with Michael DelGiorno, The Glenn Beck Radio Program, The Clay Travis and Buck Sexton Show, The Sean Hannity Show, The Jesse Kelly Show, The Mark Levin Show, Coast to Coast AM with George Noory and This Morning, America's First News with Gordon Deal.

Weekends feature the same mix of Premiere-provided programming and podcasts adapted for radio, including shows on money, health, technology, travel, home repair and the law, with the only local program being a half-hour public affairs program to meet minimum licensing requirements on Sunday morning. Outside some paid programming, weekend programs include The Kim Komando Show, Bill Handel on The Law, At Home with Gary Sullivan, The Verdict with Ted Cruz, Armstrong & Getty, Sunday Nights with Bill Cunningham and Somewhere in Time with Art Bell.

== History ==
On January 1, 1948, the station signed on the air at 690 kHz as KEPO, first as an affiliate of ABC Radio. It was powered at 5,000 watts and owned by H.J. Griffith, who served as station president.

In 1957, its call letters were changed to KHEY, airing a country music format for many years. Historically, KHEY was one of several country music stations in El Paso, and was the last AM station in the market to keep its country format. In 1974, KHEY added a sister station, 96.3 KEZB, which aired a beautiful music format. That station today is co-owned KHEY-FM.

In 1998, San Antonio-based Clear Channel Communications (renamed iHeartMedia in 2014), acquired both KHEY-AM-FM and KTSM-AM-FM. Under Clear Channel management, the two AM stations' call signs and formats were swapped in 2000, with KHEY on AM 690 becoming KTSM and inheriting its talk format, while KTSM on AM 1380 became KHEY and became a sports radio station, with 1380's existing personnel transferring to KHEY-FM.
