= KSII =

Radio station in El Paso, Texas

Coordinates: 31.796°N 106.483°W

- El Paso, Texas; United States
- Broadcast area: El Paso, Texas
- Frequency: 93.1 MHz
- Branding: 93.1 KISS-FM

Programming
- Format: Hot adult contemporary
- Affiliations: Compass Media Networks

Ownership
- Owner: Townsquare Media; (Townsquare Media of El Paso, Inc.)

History
- First air date: 1976 (as KAMA-FM)
- Former call signs: KAMA-FM (1976–1982); KAMZ (1982–1995)
- Call sign meaning: KSII = The word "Kiss" jumbled

Technical information
- Licensing authority: FCC
- Facility ID: 36949
- Class: C
- ERP: 98,000 watts
- HAAT: 433 meters (1,421 ft)

Links
- Public license information: Public file; LMS
- Webcast: Listen Live
- Website: kisselpaso.com

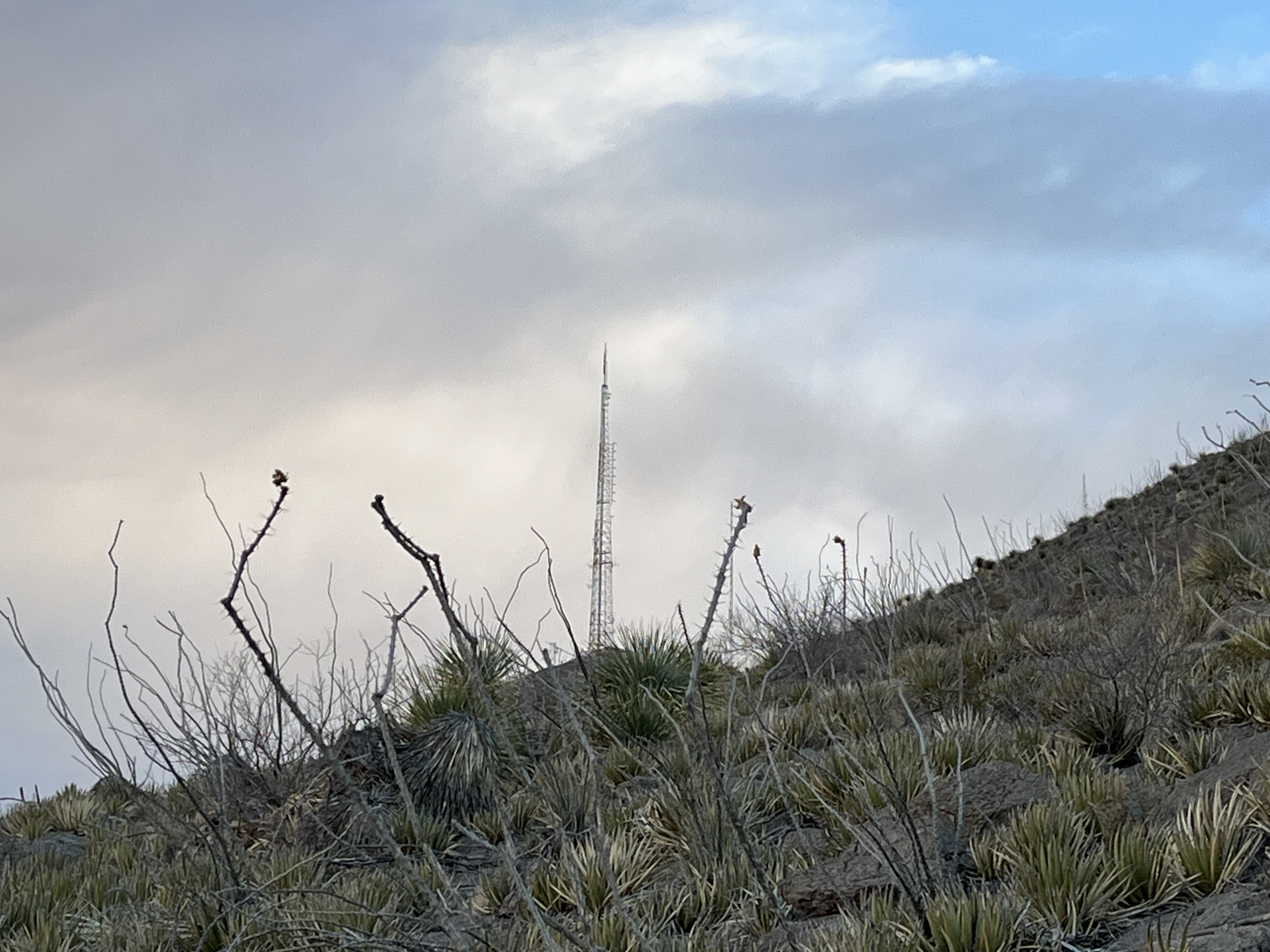
KSII transmitter

KSII (93.1 FM) is a radio station that serves the El Paso, Texas, area with hot adult contemporary music known as 93.1 KISS-FM. It is under ownership of Townsquare Media. Its studios are located on North Mesa Street in northwest El Paso and its transmitter is located in the Franklin Mountains.

== History ==
93.1 MHz was the original KAMA-FM, licensed in 1976 to the owners of KAMA at 1060 kHz. In 1982, the FM station separated from KAMA and changed its calls to KAMZ, with the KSII callsign instituted in 1985.

By 2011, KSII reduced the rhythmic contemporary lean, and began acting much like an adult contemporary radio station, but still continues to report as hot adult contemporary per Mediabase & Nielsen BDS.

As of April 16, 2015 the On-Air Talent Lineup is as follows:

- Morning Drive - Mike Martinez & Tricia Martinez (No Relation)
- Mid-Days - Angel Gonzales
- Afternoon Drive - Monika
- Evenings - PopCrush Nights with Lisa Paige
- Weekends - Eddie Gonzalez
- Weekends - Alex Chavez
