= List of radio stations in Chihuahua =

This is a list of CRT-licensed radio stations in the Mexican state of Chihuahua, which can be sorted by their call signs, frequencies, location, ownership, names, and programming formats.

Radio stations in Chihuahua
Call sign	Frequency	Location	Owner	Name	Format
XETX-AM (Note: Linked to XHTX-FM, which must keep XETX-AM on the air until there are no listeners in its service area unserved by other radio stations.)	540 AM	Nuevo Casas Grandes	Eber Joel Beltrán Zamarrón	La Ranchera de Paquimé	Regional Mexican
XEPL-AM (Note: Linked to XHEPL-FM, which must keep XEPL-AM on the air until there are no listeners in its service area unserved by other radio stations.)	550 AM	Ciudad Cuauhtémoc	César Aníbal Moreno Salinas	La Súper Estación	
XEFI-AM (Note: Linked to XHFI-FM, which must keep XEFI-AM on the air until there are no listeners in its service area unserved by other radio stations.)	580 AM	Chihuahua	El Vocero del Norte, S.A. de C.V.	Studio 96.5	English and Spanish classic hits
XELOVE-AM	640 AM	Ciudad Juárez	Radio Triunfos, S.A. de C.V.	La Lupe	Spanish adult hits
XEJCC-AM	720 AM	Ciudad Juárez	Grupo Impulsor de Medios, S.A. de C.V.	La Z	Regional Mexican
XEHB-AM (Note: Linked to XHEHB-FM, which must keep XEHB-AM on the air until there are no listeners in its service area unserved by other radio stations.)	730 AM	San Francisco del Oro	XEHB, S.A. de C.V.	La Más Picuda	Regional Mexican
XEROK-AM	800 AM	Ciudad Juárez	Emisiones Radiofónicas, S.A. de C.V.	—N/a	—N/a
XEZOL-AM	860 AM	Ciudad Juárez	SIRTSA Sistema de Radio y Televisión, S.A. de C.V.	860 Radio Noticias	News/talk
XETAR-AM	870 AM	Guachochi	Instituto Nacional de los Pueblos Indígenas	La Voz de la Sierra Tarahumara	Indigenous radio
XECHEP-AM	880 AM	Chihuahua	Escápate al Paraíso, S.A. de C.V.	—N/a	—N/a
XEJ-AM	970 AM	Ciudad Juárez	Radiofónica del Norte, S.A.	La J Mexicana	
XESW-AM (Note: Linked to XHESW-FM, which must keep XESW-AM on the air until there are no listeners in its service area unserved by other radio stations.)	970 AM	Ciudad Madera	Radio Ciudad Madera, S.A.	Radio Madera	
XEFV-AM	1000 AM	Ciudad Juárez	Consorcio Tele Radial del Norte, S.A. de C.V.	La Rancherita	Regional Mexican
XEWR-AM	1110 AM	Ciudad Juárez	Radio Internacional de México, S.A.	Cristo Rey Radio	Christian radio
XEPZ-AM	1190 AM	Ciudad Juárez	Radiorama de Juárez, S.A.	Máxima	Contemporary hit radio
XEWG-AM	1240 AM	Ciudad Juárez	Emisiones Radiofónicas, S.A. de C.V.	Radio Crystal	Regional Mexican
XEP-AM	1300 AM	Ciudad Juárez	Fantástico Radio Trece, S.A. de C.V.	Radio Mexicana	Regional Mexican
XEDI-AM (Note: Combo with XHDI-FM 88.5)	1360 AM	Chihuahua	Difusoras de Chihuahua, S.A. de C.V.	@FM	Contemporary hit radio
XEF-AM	1420 AM	Ciudad Juárez	José Luis Boone Menchaca	Activa 1420	News/talk
XEYC-AM	1460 AM	Ciudad Juárez	Transmisora Regional Radio Fórmula, S.A. de C.V.	Radio Fórmula	News/talk
XECJC-AM	1490 AM	Ciudad Juárez	Radio Juarense, S.A. de C.V.	Radio Net	News/talk
XEJPV-AM	1560 AM	Ciudad Juárez	Radio Video de la Frontera, S.A. de C.V.	Radio Guadalupana	Catholic
XECSCGU-AM	1620 AM	Guachochi	Centro de Rehabilitación El Olivo, A.C.	CREO Radio	Christian
XHCPDB-FM	88.1 FM	Chihuahua	Universidad Autónoma de Chihuahua	Radio Universidad	University radio
XHDI-FM	88.5 FM	Chihuahua	Difusoras de Chihuahua, S.A. de C.V.	@FM	Contemporary hit radio
XHPEFK-FM	89.1 FM	Hidalgo del Parral	Universidad Autónoma de Chihuahua	Radio Universidad	University radio
XHFA-FM	89.3 FM	Chihuahua	Impulsora de Radio de Chihuahua, S.A. de C.V.	La Poderosa	Regional Mexican
XHDP-FM	89.7 FM	Ciudad Cuauhtémoc	Eber Joel Beltrán Zamarrón	La Ranchera de Cuauhtémoc	Regional Mexican
XHURI-FM	89.9 FM	Urique–Creel	La Voz de la Sierra Tarahumara, A.C.	La Patrona de Creel	Regional Mexican
XHUA-FM	90.1 FM	Chihuahua	XHUA-FM, S.A. de C.V.	Love FM	Romantic
XHUACJ-FM	90.1 FM	Práxedis G. Guerrero	Universidad Autónoma de Ciudad Juárez	—N/a	—N/a
XHGD-FM	90.3 FM	Hidalgo del Parral	Radio Parralense, S.A. de C.V.	La Poderosa	Regional Mexican
XHHM-FM	90.5 FM	Ciudad Delicias	X.E.H.M., S.A.	La Caliente	Regional Mexican
XHTX-FM	90.5 FM	Nuevo Casas Grandes	Eber Joel Beltrán Zamarrón	La Ranchera de Paquimé	Regional Mexican
XHAHC-FM	90.9 FM	Chihuahua	La Voz de Linares, S.A.	La Caliente	Regional Mexican
XHPGUA-FM	91.1 FM	Guachochi	Ana Cecilia Estrada Aguirre	La Patrona	Regional Mexican
XHEPL-FM	91.3 FM	Ciudad Cuauhtémoc	César Aníbal Moreno Salinas	La Súper Estación	
XHBU-FM	91.7 FM	Ejido Robinson (Chihuahua)	Radio XEBU, S.A. de C.V.	La Norteñita	Regional Mexican
XHPEDL-FM	92.1 FM	Ciudad Delicias	Universidad Autónoma de Chihuahua	Radio Universidad	University radio
XHEFO-FM	92.5 FM	Chihuahua	Radiodifusoras Unidas de Chihuahua, S.A.	Súper	Contemporary hit radio
XHPCHO-FM	92.7 FM	Guachochi	Humberto Bustillos Castillo	La Patrona	Regional Mexican
XHER-FM	92.9 FM	Ciudad Cuauhtémoc	Eber Joel Beltrán Zamarrón	Euforia	Contemporary hit radio
XHJZ-FM	92.9 FM	Ciudad Jiménez	Berenice Beltrán Berlanga	La Campera	Regional Mexican
XHBW-FM	93.3 FM	Ejido Robinson (Chihuahua)	Radiofónica XEBW del Norte, S.A. de C.V.	Magia Digital	Regional Mexican
XHDIS-FM	93.7 FM	Ciudad Delicias	Radiza, S.A. de C.V.	Flamingo Stereo	
XHHES-FM	94.1 FM	Chihuahua	XEHES-AM, S.A. de C.V.	La Patrona	Regional Mexican
XHCDS-FM	94.5 FM	Ciudad Delicias	José Pérez Ramírez	Fiesta Mexicana	Regional Mexican
XHCHH-FM	94.9 FM	Chihuahua	Radio Informativa, S.A. de C.V.	D95	English contemporary hit radio
XHSB-FM	94.9 FM	Santa Bárbara	Radio Santa Bárbara, S.A. de C.V.	Éxtasis Digital	English classic hits
XHBOC-FM	95.1 FM	Bocoyna	La Voz de la Sierra Tarahumara, A.C.	La Patrona	Regional Mexican
XHDCH-FM	95.3 FM	Santa Anita (Ciudad Delicias)	Emisora de Delicias, S.A. de C.V.	Ke Buena	Regional Mexican
XHGYC-FM	95.5 FM	Guadalupe y Calvo	Dabar Radio, A.C.	Radio Familia	Catholic radio
XHQD-FM	95.7 FM	Chihuahua	Radio XEQD, S.A. de C.V.	Switch	Contemporary hit radio
XHCPEP-FM	96.1 FM	Chihuahua	Sistema Público de Radiodifusión del Estado Mexicano	Altavoz Radio	Public radio
XHEOH-FM	96.1 FM	Ciudad Camargo	Radio XEOH-AM de Camargo, S.A. de C.V.	La Jefa	Regional Mexican
XHESW-FM	96.1 FM	Ciudad Madera	Radio Ciudad Madera, S.A.	Radio Madera	
XHFI-FM	96.5 FM	Chihuahua	El Vocero del Norte, S.A. de C.V.	Studio 96.5	English and Spanish classic hits
XHCPH-FM	96.9 FM	Hidalgo del Parral	Garzalr, S.A. de C.V.	La Tremenda	Regional Mexican
XHCHI-FM	97.3 FM	Nuevo Sacramento (Chihuahua)	GIM Televisión Nacional, S.A. de C.V.	Imagen Radio	News/talk
XHFAMA-FM	97.5 FM	El Refugio (Ciudad Camargo)	Francisco Antonio Muñoz Muñoz	Radio Fama, La Grandota	
XHARE-FM	97.7 FM	El Divisadero (Ojinaga)	Sucesión de Alfredo Rohana Estrada	Ke Buena	Regional Mexican
XHDT-FM	98.3 FM	Ciudad Cuauhtémoc	Radio Divertida XEDT, S.A. de C.V.	Like FM	Contemporary hit radio
XHPX-FM	98.3 FM	Ciudad Juárez	Stereorey México, S.A.	Exa FM	Contemporary hit radio
XHJS-FM	98.5 FM	Hidalgo del Parral	Eber Joel Beltrán Zamarrón	Euforia	Contemporary hit radio
XHACB-FM	98.9 FM	Ciudad Delicias	Radiza, S.A. de C.V.	La Lupe	Spanish adult hits
XHEPR-FM	99.1 FM	El Porvenir	XHEPR de Ciudad Juárez, S.A. de C.V.	Máxima	Contemporary hit radio
XHRPC-FM	99.3 FM	Chihuahua	Red Nacional Radioemisora, S.A.	La Bestia Grupera	Regional Mexican
XHSBT-FM	99.5 FM	San Buenaventura	Israel Beltrán Montes	La Que Buena de San Buena	Regional Mexican
XHCTC-FM	99.9 FM	Ciudad Cuauhtémoc	La Voz de Linares, S.A.	La Caliente	Regional Mexican
XHHPC-FM	100.1 FM	Hidalgo del Parral	XEHPC-AM, S.A. de C.V.	Mágica	
XHRCH-FM	100.1 FM	Ojinaga	Gerardo Quezada Vargas	Estéreo Romance	Romantic
XHBZ-FM	100.5 FM	Ciudad Delicias	XEBZ La Voz de Meoqui, S.A. de C.V.	Los 40	Contemporary hit radio
XHH-FM	100.7 FM	Ciudad Juárez	Radio Estéreo XHH-FM, S.A. de C.V.	Magia Digital	Regional Mexican
XHLO-FM	100.9 FM	Chihuahua	Sucesión de Guillermo López Borja	Exa FM	Contemporary hit radio
XHONG-FM	100.9 FM	Ojinaga	Eber Joel Beltrán Zamarrón	La Poderosa	
XHBN-FM	101.3 FM	Ciudad Delicias	Radio Delicias, S.A.	Like FM	Contemporary hit radio
XHHPR-FM	101.7 FM	Hidalgo del Parral	Multimedios Radio, S.A. de C.V.	La Lupe	Spanish adult hits
XHV-FM	101.7 FM	Nuevo Sacramento (Chihuahua)	Transmisora Regional Radio Fórmula, S.A. de C.V.	Radio Fórmula	News/talk
XHOG-FM	101.7 FM	Ojinaga	Eber Joel Beltrán Zamarrón	La Primera	
XHJK-FM	102.1 FM	Ciudad Delicias	Alejandro y José Antonio Chavero Sousa	Romántica	Romantic
XHES-FM	102.5 FM	Chihuahua	Radio Impulsora X.E.E.S., S.A.	Antena FM	News/talk
XHHIH-FM	102.5 FM	Ojinaga	José Gerardo López de la Rocha	La Ley	Regional Mexican
XHCRG-FM	102.9 FM	Ciudad Camargo	Radio Televisora Integral, S.A. de C.V.	Super FM	
XHPCCC-FM	103.3 FM	Ciudad Cuauhtémoc	Multimedios Radio, S.A. de C.V.	La Lupe	Spanish adult hits
XHEM-FM	103.5 FM	Ciudad Juárez	Fronteradio, S.A.	La Z	Regional Mexican
XHHEM-FM	103.7 FM	Chihuahua	Radio Chihuahua, S.A.		Contemporary hit radio
XHCDH-FM	104.1 FM	Ciudad Cuauhtémoc	Radiodifusora XHCDH, S.A. de C.V.	La Sabrosita	Regional Mexican
XHJIM-FM	104.3 FM	Ciudad Jiménez	Sergio Villarreal Luján	Halcón Stereo	
XHTO-FM	104.3 FM	Ciudad Juárez	Frecuencia Modulada de Ciudad Juárez, S.A.	104.3	Contemporary hit radio
XHCHA-FM	104.5 FM	Chihuahua	Multimedios Radio, S.A. de C.V.	La Lupe	Spanish adult hits
XHLOVE-FM	104.7 FM	El Porvenir	Radio Informativa, S.A. de C.V.	La Lupe	Spanish adult hits
XHEHB-FM	104.7 FM	San Francisco del Oro	XEHB, S.A. de C.V.	La Más Picuda	Regional Mexican
XHPMOC-FM	104.9 FM	Ciudad Cuauhtémoc	Sistema Radiofonico El Siglo, S.A. de C.V.	La Patrona de Cuauhtémoc	Regional Mexican
XHNVG-FM	104.9 FM	Nuevo Casas Grandes	Eber Joel Beltrán Zamarrón	Euforia	Contemporary hit radio
XHCJZ-FM	105.1 FM	Ciudad Jiménez	José Luis Chavero Reséndiz	La Tremenda	Regional Mexican
XHIM-FM	105.1 FM	Ciudad Juárez	XHIM-FM, S.A. de C.V.	Studio 105.1	English and Spanish classic hits
XHRU-FM	105.3 FM	Chihuahua	Universidad Autónoma de Chihuahua	Radio Universidad	University radio
XHRUC-FM	105.7 FM	Ciudad Cuauhtemoc	Universidad Autónoma de Chihuahua	Radio Universidad	University radio
XHGU-FM	105.9 FM	Ciudad Juárez	Radio XHGU, S.A. de C.V.	Switch	Contemporary hit radio
XHSU-FM	106.1 FM	Chihuahua	Comunicación Canal 106, S.A. de C.V.	El Lobo	Contemporary hit radio
XHUAR-FM	106.7 FM	Ciudad Juárez	Instituto Mexicano de la Radio	Órbita	Public radio
XHNZ-FM	107.5 FM	Ciudad Juárez	XHNZ-FM, S.A. de C.V.	La Poderosa	Regional Mexican
XHSCBC-FM	107.5 FM	Témoris	Radio Los Compadres, A.C.	Radio Los Compadres	Community radio
XHDAB-FM	107.9 FM	Hidalgo del Parral	Dabar Radio, A.C.	Radio Familia	Catholic radio

== Defunct stations ==
- XHHHI-FM 99.3, Hidalgo del Parral (1988-2019)
- XHEAT-FM 102.5, Hidalgo del Parral (1935–2019)
