= XEFV-AM =

Radio station in Ciudad Juárez, Chihuahua

- Ciudad Juárez, Chihuahua; Mexico
- Broadcast area: El Paso, Texas, USA
- Frequency: 1000 kHz
- Branding: La Rancherita 1000 AM

Programming
- Language: Spanish
- Format: Classic Regional Mexican

Ownership
- Owner: MegaRadio México; (Consorcio Tele Radial del Norte, S.A. de C.V.)
- Sister stations: XHH, XHGU, XEF, XEJPV, XEWR, XEZOL

History
- First air date: 1932

Technical information
- Licensing authority: CRT
- Class: B
- Power: 1,000 watts days only
- Transmitter coordinates: 31°41′09.80″N 106°25′47.45″W

Links
- Webcast: XEFV listen online

XEFV-AM (1000 kHz) is a commercial radio station serving the border towns of Ciudad Juárez, Chihuahua, Mexico (its city of license) and El Paso, Texas, United States (where it also maintains a sales office). It is owned by MegaRadio Mexico and airs a classic Regional Mexican radio format. It is known on-air as La Rancherita 1000 AM.

By day, XEFV is powered at 1,000 watts using a non-directional antenna. But it must go off the air at night because 1000 AM is a clear channel frequency and XEFV cannot cause interference to Class A stations in Mexico City, Chicago and Seattle.

== History ==
The first concession for XEFV was awarded in 1932 to José Onofre Meza, for a station broadcasting on 1370 kHz with 50 watts of power. Meza sold to Darío Córdoba by 1952. Upon Córdoba's death, ownership passed to his widow, Luz Esparza Vda. de Córdoba. XEFV was sold in 1994 to its current concessionaire.
