= KELP =

KELP may refer to:

- the ICAO code for the El Paso International Airport
- KELP (AM), a radio station (1590 AM) licensed to El Paso, Texas, United States
- KELP-FM, a radio station (89.3 FM) licensed to Mesquite, New Mexico, United States

== See also ==
- Kelp (disambiguation)
