= XEF-AM =

Radio station in Ciudad Juárez, Chihuahua, Mexico

- Ciudad Juárez, Chihuahua; Mexico
- Frequency: 1420 AM
- Branding: Activa

Programming
- Format: Talk radio

Ownership
- Owner: MegaRadio; (José Luis Boone Menchaca)
- Sister stations: XEFV-AM, XEJPV-AM, XEWR-AM, XEZOL-AM, XHGU-FM, XHH-FM

History
- First air date: September 29, 1935

Technical information
- Licensing authority: CRT
- Class: C
- Power: 5 kW day 0.5 kW night
- Transmitter coordinates: 31°41′09.8″N 106°25′47.45″W

Links
- Webcast: Listen live
- Website: megaradio.mx

XEF-AM is a talk radio station on 1420 AM in Ciudad Juárez, Chihuahua, Mexico. XEF-AM is known as Activa and is owned by MegaRadio.

== History ==
XEF-AM went on the air at 1450 kHz on September 29, 1935. It was the first station in the Juárez-El Paso region to broadcast exclusively in Spanish, receiving its concession in 1937. José Carlos Amaya was the original concessionaire; by the 1960s, Boone Menchaca was the concessionaire.
