= XHUA-FM =

Radio station in Chihuahua, Chihuahua, Mexico

- Chihuahua, Chihuahua; Mexico
- Frequency: 90.1 MHz
- Branding: Love FM

Programming
- Format: Romantic

Ownership
- Owner: Grupo Radiorama; (XHUA-FM, S.A. de C.V.)
- Operator: Grupo Audiorama Chihuahua
- Sister stations: XHDI-FM, XHFA-FM, XHRPC-FM, XHFI-FM

History
- First air date: November 28, 1988 (concession)
- Call sign meaning: Last two letters of "Chihuahua"

Technical information
- Licensing authority: CRT
- Class: B1
- ERP: 19,640 watts
- HAAT: 89.3 m (293 ft)

Links
- Webcast: Listen live
- Website: audioramachihuahua.mx/love

XHUA-FM is a radio station located in Chihuahua, Chihuahua, Mexico, known as Love FM.

== History ==
XHUA received its concession on November 28, 1988. It was owned by Grupo Radiorama subsidiary Audio Cultura, S.A. For most of its history, the station broadcast as Estéreo Vida, airing contemporary music in Spanish.

In June 2016, Radiorama's XHUA-FM and Grupo BM Radio's XHHES-FM switched formats. A pop format, Estéreo Sensación, was installed on the 90.1 frequency, while Estéreo Vida moved to 94.1.

In 2017, XHUA became romantic "Love FM" when operation of the station shifted to Grupo Audiorama, a related company.
