= KSVE =

KSVE may refer to:

- KSVE (AM), a radio station (1650 AM) licensed to El Paso, Texas, United States
- KHRO, a radio station (1150 AM) licensed to El Paso, Texas, United States, which held the call sign KSVE from July 1992 to March 1994 and from June 1994 to September 2008
- the ICAO code for Susanville Municipal Airport
