= La Z =

La Z may refer to:

- WDTW (AM), a Spanish-language radio station (1310 AM, 107.9 FM) licensed to Dearborn, Michigan, United States
- XEKC-AM / XHKC-FM, a regional Mexican radio station (1460 AM, 100.9 FM) licensed to Oaxaca City, Oaxaca, Mexico
- XEQR-FM, a Grupera radio station (107.3 FM) licensed to Mexico City, Mexico
- XEJCC-AM / XHEM-FM, a regional Mexican radio station (720 AM, 103.5 FM) licensed to Ciudad Juárez, Chihuahua, Mexico
- XHCW-FM, a Grupera radio station (96.5 FM) licensed to Los Mochis, Sinaloa, Mexico
- XERPO-AM / XHRPO-FM, former Grupera radio station (710 AM, 97.7 FM) licensed to Santa Cruz Amilpas, Oaxaca, Mexico
