= XHBOC-FM =

Radio station in Bocoyna-San Juanito, Chihuahua

- Bocoyna/San Juanito, Chihuahua; Mexico
- Frequency: 95.1 FM
- Branding: La Patrona de San Juanito

Programming
- Format: Regional Mexican

Ownership
- Owner: Grupo Bustillos Radio; (La Voz de la Sierra Tarahumara, A.C.)
- Sister stations: XHPGUA-FM and XHPCHO-FM Guachochi, XHURI-FM Urique

History
- First air date: June 2018
- Call sign meaning: BOCoyna

Technical information
- Licensing authority: CRT
- Class: A
- ERP: 3 kW
- HAAT: 26.7 m (88 ft)

Links
- Website: XHBOC-FM on Facebook

XHBOC-FM is a radio station on 95.1 FM in Bocoyna, Chihuahua. It is known as La Patrona de San Juanito.

== History ==
La Voz de la Sierra Tarahumara applied for radio stations at Bocoyna and Urique in August 2015, and their concessions were approved by the Federal Telecommunications Institute on December 13, 2017. The station signed on in June 2018. The station is associated with commercial operator Grupo Bustillos Radio, which owns the two commercial radio stations in Guachochi.
