= XHEPR-FM =

Radio station in Ciudad Juárez, Chihuahua, Mexico

Simulcast with XEPZ-AM 1190
- Ciudad Juárez, Chihuahua; Mexico
- Frequency: 99.1 FM
- Branding: Máxima

Programming
- Format: Pop music in English and Spanish

Ownership
- Owner: Sistema Radio Lobo; (XHEPR de Ciudad Juárez, S.A. de C.V.)
- Operator: Francisco Antonio Muñoz Muñoz

History
- First air date: September 30, 1994 (concession)
- Call sign meaning: El PoRvenir (city of license)

Technical information
- Licensing authority: CRT
- Class: C1
- ERP: 50,000 watts
- HAAT: 356 meters (1,168 ft)
- Transmitter coordinates: 31°24′15.0″N 106°25′03.7″W

Links
- Webcast: Listen live
- Website: maximafm991.com

XHEPR-FM is a radio station in on 99.1 FM in Ciudad Juárez, Chihuahua. It is owned by Sistema Radio Lobo and carries a pop music format in English and Spanish known as Máxima. XHEPR-FM's transmitter is located south of Ciudad Juárez in the Sierra Presidio mountain range.

== History ==
Planeta 99.1 logo used from November 2015–May 2018 and in June and early July 2019

XHEPR's concession was awarded to Javier Moreno Valle, a businessman from Mexico City, and founder of the Mexico City-based television station XHTVM-TV, on September 30, 1994.

In 2000, Moreno Valle, facing much difficulty with a big dispute over the Mexico City station, sold the station to Radio Integral, S.A. de C.V. (Grupo ACIR), which had already been operating the station as grupera "La Comadre". That year, in partnership with the US-based company Clear Channel Communications, which at the time owned 40% of ACIR, XHEPR became "99.1 The Bandit", playing classic rock in English. In 2006, it became a classic hits-formatted "The Eagle 99.1", which lasted until mid 2009, when Clear Clannel ceased operating.

Eventually, ACIR sold XHEPR to Grupo Radiorama (with operation handled by Grupo Radio México), though the concession remained in the name of Radio Integral until late 2015. The station was initially known as "Pancho 99.1" with a Regional Mexican format under management of Grupo Radio México, and in December 2014 changing its name to "Radio Centro 99.1" with a news/talk format.

In November 2015, XHEPR took on the Planeta Spanish CHR format from 103.5 as part of a reorganization of GRM stations in Ciudad Juárez. On May 8, 2018, GRM and Radiorama swapped the frequencies of their pop stations in Ciudad Juárez, with Planeta being moved from 99.1 to XHIM-FM 105.1 and @FM being moved from 105.1 to 99.1.

On May 8, 2019, XHEPR flipped to Regional Mexican music, branded as "Madre 99.1". On June 15, Madre was moved to 105.1 and Planeta returned to the 99.1 frequency. Within a month, however, XHEPR dropped Planeta and became Estéreo Vida. That format lasted less than a year, as the station flipped to Studio 99.1, mirroring the 1980s- and 1990s-focused classic hits format was installed on XHFI-FM in the city of Chihuahua, on July 1, 2020.

XHEPR and XHIM swapped formats again for the third time in four years in 2021, returning Madre to the 99.1 frequency. On September 2, 2021, Grupo Radio Centro resumed the operation of XHEPR, placing its pop music brand known as Alfa.

On April 1, 2022, XHEPR again changes its operator to the owners of XHFAMA-FM of Ciudad Camargo, Tamaulipas.
