= XHGU-FM =

Radio station in Ciudad Juárez, Chihuahua

Switch FM
- Ciudad Juárez, Chihuahua; Mexico
- Broadcast area: El Paso, Texas, United States
- Frequency: 105.9 MHz (HD Radio)
- Branding: Switch FM

Programming
- Format: Spanish Contemporary Hit Radio

Ownership
- Owner: MegaRadio México; (Radio XHGU-FM, S.A. de C.V.)
- Sister stations: XEF, XEJPV, XEWR, XEZOL, XHH-FM

History
- First air date: October 17, 1980 (concession)
- Call sign meaning: Guillermo O. Huerta Ramírez (original concessionaire)

Technical information
- Licensing authority: CRT
- Class: C
- ERP: 100,000 watts
- HAAT: 71.2 meters (234 ft)
- Transmitter coordinates: 31°42′08.7″N 106°30′20.1″W

Links
- Webcast: Listen live
- Website: http://switchfm.mx/jrz/

XHGU-FM (105.9 MHz) is a radio station serving the border towns of Ciudad Juárez, Chihuahua, Mexico (its city of license) and El Paso, Texas, United States (where it also maintains a sales office). It is owned by MegaRadio México and carries a pop format known as Switch FM.

XHGU-FM broadcasts in HD.

== History ==
XHGU received its concession on October 17, 1980. It was owned by Guillermo O. Huerta Ramírez and broadcast with an ERP of 23 kW. In July 1982, XHGU was authorized to double its power to 46 kW.

On December 31, 2002, the SCT authorized XHGU to move its transmitter to Ojitos, on Cerro del Indio, with an effective radiated power of 100,000 watts.

In 2016, XHGU flipped from its previous Romance romantic format to Switch, MegaRadio's new pop format.
