= KBNA =

KBNA may refer to:

- The ICAO code for Nashville International Airport
- KBNA-FM, a radio station (97.5 FM) licensed to El Paso, Texas, United States
- KQBU (AM), a radio station (920 AM) licensed to El Paso, Texas, United States, which used the call sign KBNA from December 2004 to December 2007
