= Kelp (disambiguation) =

Kelp is seaweed.

Kelp may also refer to:

- Kelp Records, music label
- KELP, El Paso International Airport ICAO code
- Kelp Harbour, Falkland Islands
- Broadcasting stations
  - KELP (AM)
  - KELP-FM
