= XHFA =

Two Mexican stations bear the callsign XHFA:

- XHFA-FM 89.3, "La Poderosa" in Chihuahua, Chihuahua
- XHFA-TDT virtual channel 2 (RF 15) in Nogales, Sonora, transmitter for Azteca Trece
