= KINT-TV =

Television station in El Paso, Texas

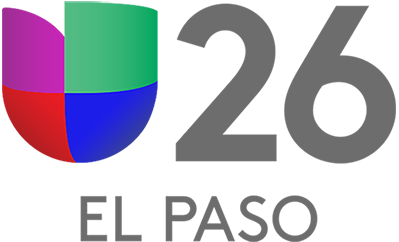
- El Paso, Texas; United States
- City: El Paso, Texas
- Channels: Digital: 25 (UHF); Virtual: 26
- Branding: Univision 26 El Paso; Noticias El Paso (newscasts)

Programming
- Affiliations: 26.1: Univision; for others, see § Subchannels

Ownership
- Owner: Entravision Communications; (Entravision Holdings, LLC)
- Sister stations: TV: KTFN; Radio: KHRO, KINT-FM, KOFX, KYSE

History
- First air date: May 5, 1984
- Former channel numbers: Analog: 26 (UHF, 1984–2009)
- Call sign meaning: Internaciónal

Technical information
- Licensing authority: FCC
- Facility ID: 51708
- ERP: 1,000 kW
- HAAT: 439.1 m (1,441 ft)
- Transmitter coordinates: 31°47′46″N 106°28′59″W

Links
- Public license information: Public file; LMS
- Website: noticiaselpaso.com

KINT-TV (channel 26) is a television station in El Paso, Texas, United States, affiliated with the Spanish-language network Univision. It is owned by Entravision Communications alongside UniMás affiliate KTFN (channel 65). The two stations share studios on North Mesa Street/Highway 20 in northwest El Paso; KINT-TV's transmitter is located atop the Franklin Mountains on the El Paso city limits.

== History ==
The station first signed on the air on May 5, 1984; it was founded by a consortium of local businessmen including Larry Daniels (former manager of KROD-TV (channel 4, now KDBC-TV), and owner of KINT radio (1590 AM, now KELP and 97.5 FM, now at 93.9) as well as other businesses) and Jose Angel Silva Sr., owner of a grocery store in downtown El Paso. The consortium originally planned to use KEHB-TV as the station's call letters, but it was changed to KINT (standing for "K-Internaciónal") prior to sign on. For many years, it was the only Spanish-language television station in the El Paso market.

El Paso is divided by a prominent natural ridge (part of the Franklin Mountains), where all of the U.S.-based television stations in the market maintain their transmitter towers and antennas. There are four general sites ranging from 600 to 1,800 feet (180 to 550 m) above average terrain, the 300-foot (91 m) self-supporting tower just above Scenic Drive (long used by KVIA-TV (channel 7)), the "Old Channel 4" site with a 288-foot (88 m) tower first used by KROD-TV), the "New 4 site", Channel 0, and ch. 14 (used by KFOX-TV). In founding the station, Daniels worked out a partnership between KDBC-TV and Larry Gallatin's two-way company. A new 440-foot (130 m) self-supporting tower was put up, with channel 4 at its top, channel 26's being side-mounted, on a 100-foot (30 m) tower that was long vacant (now occupied by radio station KSII (93.1 FM) and KINT-FM) and two-way space at the bottom.

== News operation ==
KINT-TV presently broadcasts 12 hours of locally produced newscasts each week (with two hours each weekday and one hour each on Saturdays and Sundays). Newscasts for the Midland–Odessa and San Angelo markets are broadcast live from KINT's studios.

== Technical information ==
=== Subchannels ===
The station's signal is multiplexed:

Subchannels of KINT-TV
Channel	Res.	Short name	Programming
26.1	1080i	KINT-DT	Univision
26.2	480i	Grit	Grit
26.3	480i	LATV	LATV
26.4	480i	Bounce	Bounce TV
26.5	480i	MvSphre	MovieSphere Gold

On March 16, 2010, KINT's main channel was upgraded to 1080i high definition in order to allow the carriage of Univision programming produced in the format. The station also added a second digital subchannel, carrying a simulcast of sister station KTFN. On December 3, 2010, the KTFN simulcast was replaced with LATV on KINT subchannel 26.2 and KTFN digital channel 65.2. The following week, the SD simulcast of KTFN was restored on the second subchannels of both stations, with LATV being moved to digital subchannels 26.3 and 65.3. For a brief period prior to the digital television transition, the station's second digital subchannel falsely identified itself as "KINT-HD", while it was still only available in 480i standard definition. As of June 12, they have corrected the problem.

=== Analog-to-digital conversion ===
KINT-TV shut down its analog signal, over UHF channel 26, at noon on June 12, 2009, the official date on which full-power television stations in the United States transitioned from analog to digital broadcasts under federal mandate. The station's digital signal remained on its pre-transition UHF channel 25, using virtual channel 26. After regular programming was discontinued on its analog signal, the station, as well as sister station KTFN, transmitted a repeated crawl in Spanish informing viewers about the digital transition and advising viewers of their options to continue receiving programming, which ran until KINT permanently ceased analog transmissions at 11:59 p.m.
