= XHIM-FM =

Radio station in Ciudad Juárez, Chihuahua, Mexico

Coordinates: 31°40′15.1″N 106°31′09.8″W

- Ciudad Juárez, Chihuahua; Mexico
- Broadcast area: El Paso, Texas; Ciudad Juárez, Chihuahua.
- Frequency: 105.1 MHz
- Branding: Studio 105.1

Programming
- Format: English and Spanish classic hits

Ownership
- Owner: Grupo Radiorama; (XHIM-FM, S.A. de C.V.)
- Sister stations: XEPZ-AM, XHEPR-FM, XHNZ-FM, KINT-FM

History
- First air date: December 16, 1975
- Call sign meaning: Sergio Islas Morales, original concessionaire

Technical information
- Licensing authority: CRT
- Class: C1
- ERP: 20,000 watts
- HAAT: 420.6 m (1,380 ft)

Links
- Webcast: Listen live
- Website: www.radiorama.mx/aradios.php?id=335

XHIM-FM (105.1 MHz) is a radio station serving the border towns of Ciudad Juárez, Chihuahua, Mexico (its city of license) and El Paso, Texas, U.S. It is owned by Grupo Radiorama and known as Studio 105.1 with an English and Spanish classic hits format.

== History ==
Arroba FM logo

XHIM received its concession on December 16, 1975. It was owned by Sergio Islas Morales. Radiorama bought the station in 1996. At some point, operation of the station was transferred to Grupo Radio México, which became Grupo Radio Centro in 2016.

From 2010 until 2014, XHIM was known as "Rock 105" with English alternative rock, which in August 2014 was replaced by the adult album alternative format in English "Universal 105.1", using the logo and brand name of corporate cousin XHFO-FM from Mexico City. However, in November 2015, GRM returned operation of the station to Radiorama, which promptly installed its own "@FM" format on the station. The Universal 105.1 site remained active with a commercial-free stream of the station, which in 2019 was replaced by web format "Classic Rock Universal".

On May 8, 2018, Grupo Radio Centro and Radiorama swapped the frequencies of their pop stations in Juárez, with Planeta moving from 99.1 to 105.1 and @FM moving from 105.1 to 99.1. The swap was undone on June 15, 2019, with Planeta returning to 99.1 and Madre, a grupera format started on XHEPR just the month before, relocating to XHIM. The swap was reversed again in May 2021, leading to XHIM-FM adopting the current English- and Spanish-language classic hits programming that had been on 99.1.
