= 870 AM =

AM radio frequency

The following radio stations broadcast on AM frequency 870 kHz: 870 AM is a United States clear-channel frequency. WWL in New Orleans, Louisiana, is the dominant Class A station on 870 kHz.

== In Argentina ==
- LRA1 Nacional in Buenos Aires.
- LRA40 Futbol in Buenos Aires.

== In Canada ==
Call sign	City of license	Daytime power (kW)	Nighttime power (kW)	Transmitter coordinates
CFBV	Smithers, British Columbia	1	0.5	54.796111°N 127.198611°W
CFSX	Stephenville, Newfoundland and Labrador	0.5	0.5	48.526111°N 58.49°W
CKIR	Invermere, British Columbia	1	0.25	50.5189°N 116.051°W

== In Mexico ==
- XEACC-AM in Puerto Escondido, Oaxaca
- XEGRO-AM in Chilpancingo, Guerrero
- XETAR-AM in Guachochi, Chihuahua

== In the United States ==
Stations in bold are clear-channel stations.

Call sign	City of license	Facility ID	Class	Daytime power (kW)	Nighttime power (kW)	Transmitter coordinates
KAAN	Bethany, Missouri	31004	D	0.93		40.256389°N 94.156389°W
KFJZ	Fort Worth, Texas	23138	D	1		32.600833°N 97.255833°W
KFLD	Pasco, Washington	16725	B	10	0.25	46.228056°N 119.125556°W
KJMP	Pierce, Colorado	129513	B	1.2	0.32	40.606944°N 104.688611°W
KPRM	Park Rapids, Minnesota	15975	B	50	2.5	46.928333°N 95.006111°W (daytime); 46.905°N 95.017778°W (nighttime)
KRLA	Glendale, California	61267	B	50	3	34.136944°N 118.226111°W
WFLO	Farmville, Virginia	12317	D	1		37.326389°N 78.385833°W
WHCU	Ithaca, New York	18048	B	5	1	42.465°N 76.373056°W (daytime); 42.363056°N 76.606111°W (nighttime)
WKAR	East Lansing, Michigan	41684	D	10		42.706111°N 84.475278°W
WMTL	Leitchfield, Kentucky	27024	D	0.5		37.511111°N 86.2875°W
WPWT	Colonial Heights, Tennessee	42652	D	10		36.461111°N 82.453333°W
WQBS	San Juan, Puerto Rico	573	B	5	5	18.352222°N 66.201667°W
WTCG	Mount Holly, North Carolina	68392	D	5		35.273611°N 80.861111°W
WTIM	Assumption, Illinois	73996	D	0.5		39.487222°N 88.958611°W
**WWL**	New Orleans, Louisiana	34377	A	50	50	29.837222°N 90.131944°W
