= KBNA-FM =

Radio station in El Paso, Texas

- El Paso, Texas; United States
- Broadcast area: El Paso metropolitan area; Ciudad Juárez
- Frequency: 97.5 MHz
- Branding: Ké Buena 97.5

Programming
- Language: Spanish
- Format: Regional Mexican

Ownership
- Owner: Luz María Rygaard; (97.5 Licensee TX, LLC)
- Sister stations: KAMA; KQBU; XHEM-FM; XHTO-FM

History
- First air date: February 15, 1969
- Former call signs: KINT-FM (1969–1982); KYSR-FM (1982–1985)
- Call sign meaning: "Ké Buena" (How Good)

Technical information
- Licensing authority: FCC
- Facility ID: 67066
- Class: C
- ERP: 100,000 watts horizontal; 48,000 watts vertical
- HAAT: 332 meters (1,089 ft)
- Transmitter coordinates: 31°47′34″N 106°28′47″W

Links
- Public license information: Public file; LMS
- Webcast: Listen live
- Website: kebuena975.com

KBNA-FM (97.5 MHz; "Ké Buena 97.5") is a radio station in El Paso, Texas, United States, owned by Luz María Rygaard. It broadcasts a regional Mexican format and broadcasts from a transmitter in the Franklin Mountains to the El Paso–Juárez area.

== History ==
=== Early years ===
On February 16, 1969, KINT-FM first signed on. It was owned by Sun County Broadcasting, which also owned KINT (1590 AM; now KELP). The 1970s version of KINT-FM is not related to the current KINT-FM, heard on 93.9 MHz and owned by Entravision Communications. While its AM station carried a contemporary hits format, KINT-FM aired progressive rock.

By the mid-1970s, KINT-FM had joined its AM sister station, playing top 40 hits and later adding disco music. Larry Daniels owned KINT-AM-FM in the early 1970s. Jim Tabor (formerly a DJ at KLIF in Dallas) and his father bought the stations in 1974. The studios and the 1590 AM transmitter were at 5300 El Paso Drive. They moved the offices to the 5959 Gateway Building near Bassett Center, and then bought a building at 5710 Trowbridge that became known as Radio Center.

=== KYSR-FM ===
Tabor later changed the AM call sign and format in 1979 to KKOL "Kool Oldies". He sold the AM to Gary Acker in 1981. KINT-FM was sold to a new company called Great American Broadcasting, Inc., with an AM station on 920 kHz (now KQBU). In 1982, Great American changed the call letters to KYSR and KYSR-FM.

KYSR-FM moved from contemporary hits to adult contemporary music. In 1982, the stations changed hands again, going to KYS Radio.

=== KBNA-FM ===
In 1985, the two stations were acquired by Tichenor Radio. Tichenor specialized in Spanish language formats and flipped the stations to Regional Mexican music as KBNA and KBNA-FM or "Ké Buena" ("How Good"). Tichenor stations, including KBNA-AM-FM, were acquired by Univision Communications in 2003. Univision flipped the AM station to Spanish language talk radio but kept Regional Mexican music playing on KBNA-FM.

In 2016, Univision Radio exited the El Paso media market by selling its stations to an affiliate of Mexican radio broadcaster Grupo Radio Centro for $2 million. GRC took over operations via a local marketing agreement (LMA) on November 8. Rafael Márquez, a United States citizen, owned 75 percent of the licensee, under the business name "97.5 Licensee TX, LLC". The remainder was owned by Grupo Radio Centro TX, LLC, a subsidiary of the Mexican media company.

In 2021, Luz María Rygaard filed to buy the stations of 97.5 Licensee TX, LLC. By 2022, the United States operations of the Radio Centro cluster in El Paso were transferred to Pro Radio LLC, a subsidiary of the Mexican Grupo Audiorama Comunicaciones, which also owns stations in Ciudad Juárez, without a written agreement as required by the Federal Communications Commission (FCC). In 2023, Rygaard filed to sell the stations to Lorena Margarita Pérez Toscano. The FCC's investigation of the case revealed substantial inconsistencies in station operations as well as questions as to whether Pérez Toscano had already taken control, as Rygaard served as an employee of Pro Radio while being the nominal owner. As a result, in January 2026, the FCC's Media Bureau designated the transfer for a hearing that could lead to the revocation of the stations' broadcast licenses.
