= KOFX =

Radio station in El Paso, Texas, US

- El Paso, Texas; United States
- Broadcast area: El Paso metropolitan area
- Frequency: 92.3 MHz
- Branding: 92.3 The Fox

Programming
- Format: Classic hits; classic rock

Ownership
- Owner: Entravision Communications; (Entravision Holdings, LLC)
- Sister stations: KHRO, KINT-FM, KSVE, KYSE, KINT-TV, KTFN

History
- First air date: June 6, 1978 (as KFIM)
- Former call signs: KSDL (construction permit); KFIM (1978–1987)
- Call sign meaning: "The Fox" (refers to station branding, letters transposed)

Technical information
- Licensing authority: FCC
- Facility ID: 39613
- Class: C
- ERP: 98,000 watts; 100,000 with beam tilt
- HAAT: 567 meters (1,860 ft)
- Transmitter coordinates: 31°48′55.00″N 106°29′20.00″W

Links
- Public license information: Public file; LMS
- Webcast: Listen live
- Website: 923thefox.com

KOFX (92.3 FM, "92.3 the Fox") is a commercial radio station in El Paso, Texas. It follows a classic hits radio format that leans toward classic rock, and plays artists such as Van Halen, The Rolling Stones, and Pat Benatar, but not Madonna. It is owned by Entravision Communications, with the license held by Entravision Holdings, LLC. It shares studio facilities with four other Entravision radio stations and two television stations, KINT-TV and KTFN, all of which are on North Mesa Street (Texas State Highway 20) in Northwest El Paso.

The transmitter is off Grand Teton Drive, atop the Franklin Mountains in the El Paso city limits. KOFX has an effective radiated power (ERP) of 98,000 watts (100,000 with beam tilt). Programming is simulcast on co-owned KHRO (1150 AM).

== History ==
The station was founded by a partnership of businessmen from Hobbs, New Mexico—John A. Parry, Theodore R. Johnson, and Glen L. Houston—called The Media Company. They had operated two radio stations in New Mexico (now KLEA and KZOR). The original Federal Communications Commission (FCC) construction permit called for the transmitter to be co-located with Channel 4 KDBC-TV, though this was never built.

On June 6, 1978, the station signed on as KFIM. The station's logo was usually shown as "92KF/M", and it featured a Top 40 format. The Media Company changed its corporate name to 92KF/M, Inc., that same year. The transmitter was installed on the Channel 14 KFOX-TV tower, with studios in the Peppertree Square Shopping Center on North Mesa Street in West El Paso Center. KFIM had to compete with 97.5 KINT-FM (now KBNA-FM), which had already been established as El Paso's big Top 40 station. In 1981, a receiver was appointed for KFIM.

ELP Broadcasting Associates bought the station in 1986 and changed the station call sign to KOFX the next year. ELP Broadcasting moved the station from Top 40 to a hot adult contemporary sound, and began using "The Fox" as the station's moniker. The studios remained at the Peppertree Square Shopping Center.

KOFX was sold in 1994 to Magic Broadcasting for $3 million. It switched to a classic hits format and the studios moved to 4105 Rio Bravo Street, off Executive Center Boulevard.

Entravision acquired KOFX in 1999. KOFX's studios were moved to the Entravision facilities on North Mesa Street. KOFX and its AM simulcast partner, 1150 KHRO, are Entravision's only English-language stations in El Paso.
