= 970 AM =

AM radio frequency

The following radio stations broadcast on AM frequency 970 kHz: 970 AM is a regional broadcast frequency.

== In Argentina ==
- LRA43 Neuquén, Neuquén
- LT25 in Curuzú Cuatiá, Corrientes

== In Mexico ==
- XECJ-AM in Apatzingán, Michoacán
- XEJ-AM in Cd. Juárez, Chihuahua
- XERFR-AM in Mexico City, DF
- XEUG-AM in Guanajuato, Guanajuato

== In the United States ==
Call sign	City of license	Facility ID	Class	Daytime power (kW)	Nighttime power (kW)	Transmitter coordinates
KBUL	Billings, Montana	16772	B	5	5	45.743056°N 108.543333°W
KCFO	Tulsa, Oklahoma	22665	B	2.5	1	36.196111°N 96.039444°W
KESP	Modesto, California	11233	B	1	1	37.689722°N 120.953333°W
KFBX	Fairbanks, Alaska	12518	B	10	10	64.88°N 147.674722°W
KFEL	Pueblo, Colorado	23151	D	3.2	0.185	38.265833°N 104.678889°W
KHTY	Bakersfield, California	40868	B	1	5	35.45°N 118.946667°W
KHVN	Fort Worth, Texas	63780	B	1	0.27	32.798889°N 97.295278°W
KIXL	Del Valle, Texas	35011	B	1	1	30.320278°N 97.623611°W
KJLT	North Platte, Nebraska	67751	D	5	0.055	41.16°N 100.878611°W
KKRK	Rupert, Idaho	67743	B	1		42.601944°N 113.7225°W
KNEA	Jonesboro, Arkansas	31609	D	1	0.041	35.854722°N 90.729167°W
KNIH	Paradise, Nevada	33074	B	5	0.5	36.011111°N 115.241111°W
KNWZ	Coachella, California	12130	B	5	0.36	33.686667°N 116.157778°W
KQAQ	Austin, Minnesota	56811	B	5	0.5	43.7075°N 92.945833°W
KSYL	Alexandria, Louisiana	9750	D	1	0.12	31.326389°N 92.489444°W (daytime); 31.326111°N 92.489167°W (nighttime)
KTTO	Spokane, Washington	38492	B	5.3	0.75	47.616111°N 117.365278°W
KUFO	Portland, Oregon	26926	B	5	5	45.515556°N 122.732222°W
KVWM	Show Low, Arizona	17336	D	5	0.195	34.211111°N 110.005556°W
WAMD	Aberdeen, Maryland	39550	B	0.3	0.5	39.509722°N 76.193889°W
WATH	Athens, Ohio	71096	D	1	0.026	39.344444°N 82.105833°W
WBGG	Pittsburgh, Pennsylvania	59960	B	5	5	40.510833°N 80.0075°W
WBLF	Bellefonte, Pennsylvania	17317	D	1	0.07	40.903333°N 77.768333°W
WDAY	Fargo, North Dakota	22126	B	10	10	46.646667°N 96.363889°W
WDCZ	Buffalo, New York	27668	B	5	5	42.744722°N 78.886944°W
WDNT	Spring City, Tennessee	54469	D	0.5	0.024	35.666389°N 84.878889°W
WDUL	Superior, Wisconsin	26590	D	1	0.026	46.724444°N 92.119722°W
WESO	Southbridge, Massachusetts	18309	D	1	0.021	42.066389°N 71.991111°W
WEZZ	Canton, North Carolina	51155	D	5	0.03	35.532778°N 82.866111°W
WFLA	Tampa, Florida	29729	B	25	11	28.020556°N 82.609444°W
WFQY	Brandon, Mississippi	54820	D	0.35	0.09	32.273889°N 90.013611°W
WFSR	Harlan, Kentucky	18284	D	5	0.024	36.867222°N 83.326667°W
WFUN	Ashtabula, Ohio	54565	B	5	1	41.814444°N 80.779167°W
WGTK	Louisville, Kentucky	63936	B	5	5	38.318056°N 85.744167°W
WHA	Madison, Wisconsin	6139	D	5	0.051	43.041667°N 89.409444°W
WKCI	Waynesboro, Virginia	70862	B	5	1	38.086667°N 78.911667°W
WKHM	Jackson, Michigan	9246	B	1	1	42.192778°N 84.428889°W
WMAY	Springfield, Illinois	38348	B	1	0.5	39.861667°N 89.542222°W
WMPW	Danville, Virginia	15501	D	1	0.054	36.559444°N 79.367222°W
WNIV	Atlanta, Georgia	23607	D	5	0.039	33.809722°N 84.353889°W
WNNR	Jacksonville, Florida	71219	D	1	0.164	30.385556°N 81.667778°W
WNYM	Hackensack, New Jersey	58635	B	50	5	40.911111°N 74.028333°W
WRCS	Ahoskie, North Carolina	73934	D	1	0.08	36.279444°N 77.033056°W
WSTX	Christiansted, Virgin Islands	20589	B	5	1	17.756389°N 64.693889°W
WTBF	Troy, Alabama	68179	D	5	0.045	31.834722°N 85.933333°W
WVOP	Vidalia, Georgia	70116	D	4	0.06	32.22°N 82.435278°W
WWRK	Florence, South Carolina	3112	D	10	0.031	34.233889°N 79.780833°W
WZAM	Ishpeming, Michigan	64504	D	0.25	0.062	46.505556°N 87.54°W
WZAN	Portland, Maine	58538	B	5	5	43.605278°N 70.321667°W

== In Uruguay ==
- CX 22 Radio Universal in Montevideo
