= KYSE =

Radio station in El Paso, Texas

- El Paso, Texas; United States
- Broadcast area: El Paso metropolitan area - Ciudad Juárez - Las Cruces
- Frequency: 94.7 MHz
- Branding: Fuego 94.7

Programming
- Format: Bilingual Rhythmic Contemporary

Ownership
- Owner: Entravision Communications (McCarter Families Inc.); (Entravision Holdings, LLC)
- Sister stations: KHRO, KINT-FM, KOFX, KSVE, KINT-TV, KTFN

History
- First air date: November 29, 1958
- Former call signs: KHMS (1958–1962); KSET-FM (1962–1966, 1969-1986); KPAK (1966–1969); KLTO (1986–1991); KAMA-FM (1991–1992); KSET (1992–1998); KATH (1998–2000); KHRO (2000–2005)

Technical information
- Licensing authority: FCC
- Facility ID: 39612
- Class: C
- ERP: 100,000 watts (horizontal); 67,000 watts (vertical)
- HAAT: 363 meters (1,191 ft)
- Transmitter coordinates: 31°47′34.00″N 106°28′47.00″W

Links
- Public license information: Public file; LMS
- Website: elboton.com/el-paso/fuegofm/

KYSE (94.7 FM) is a commercial radio station in El Paso, Texas. It airs the "Fuego" Bilingual rhythmic contemporary radio format from its owner, Entravision Communications. (Tricolor refers to the three colors on the flag of Mexico.) The studio and offices are located on North Mesa Street (Texas State Highway 20) in northwest El Paso.

KYSE's transmitter is located in the Franklin Mountains, off Scenic Drive in El Paso. It has an effective radiated power (ERP) of 100,000 watts horizontal polarization, 67,000 watts vertical polarization. The signal can be heard in parts of Texas, New Mexico and the Mexican state of Chihuahua including Ciudad Juárez.

== History ==
=== KHMS and KSET-FM ===
The H-M Service Company, owned by Albert C. Hynes and Logan D. Matthews, obtained a Federal Communications Commission (FCC) construction permit for 94.7 MHz in 1958. The station signed on the air as KHMS, on November 29, 1958. The call sign represented the company's initials. In its early years, the signal was powered at 2,500 watts, only audible in El Paso and adjacent communities.

In 1962, the station was sold to the Rio Grande Broadcasting Company, owners of AM 1340 KSET (now KVIV), and became KSET-FM. Aside from a brief period as KPAK in the mid-1960s, the station retained these call letters for the next 24 years. KSET-FM increased its effective radiated power to 100,000 watts in 1970.

In the mid- to late 1970s and early 1980s, KSET-FM aired a Top 40 format which leaned toward rhythmic and dance music. For a time, the station was called Disco-95 during the disco music craze. It sometimes was simulcast on AM 1340 KSET.

=== Changes in Ownership ===
In the 1970s, KSET-AM-FM was transferred four times, from Rio Grande Broadcasting Company to Financial Computer Services, Automated Data Processing of El Paso, Sun World Corporation, and then Broadcast Associates of Texas. The Dunn Broadcasting Company bought KSET-AM-FM in 1982, selling off the AM two years later. In 1986, the Rio Bravo Broadcasting Company changed KSET's format to soft adult contemporary. The call sign was switched to KLTO to accompany the name "K-Lite."

Five years later, this format was replaced with a simulcast of AM 750 KAMA's Spanish-language Regional Mexican format, creating the first KAMA-FM.

=== Country, Alternative, Regional Mexican, and Bilingual Rhythmic Contemporary ===
The simulcast was short-lived and the station returned to the KSET-FM call letters in 1992, adopting a country music format, putting it in competition with El Paso's longtime country music leader 96.3 KHEY-FM. KSET-FM became KATH in 1998. But it didn't make much of a dent in KHEY-FM's ratings. It was sold to Entravision in 1999.

Logo as "La Tricolor 94.7"

Entravision switched it to alternative rock as KHRO "Hero 94.7" in 2000. Then in 2005, the station returned to a Regional Mexican format as El Gato 94.7 Salvajemente Grupera. The KHRO call sign was changed to KYSE. In 2014 the station switched to La Tricolor while still retaining the KYSE call letters.

On January 13, 2025, KYSE dropped the Regional Mexican sound for bilingual rhythmic contemporary under the branding "Fuego 94.7".
