= KSVE (AM) =

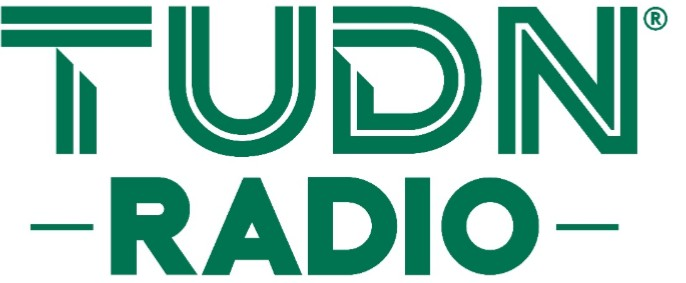
- El Paso, Texas; United States
- Frequency: 1650 kHz
- Branding: TUDN Radio El Paso

Programming
- Language: Spanish
- Format: Sports
- Affiliations: TUDN Radio

Ownership
- Owner: Entravision Communications; (Entravision Holdings, LLC)
- Sister stations: KHRO, KOFX, KYSE, KINT-FM, KINT-TV, KTFN

History
- First air date: September 4, 1998
- Former call signs: KBIV (1998–2005); KHRO (2005–2008)

Technical information
- Licensing authority: FCC
- Facility ID: 87165
- Class: B
- Power: 8,500 watts day; 850 watts night
- Transmitter coordinates: 31°45′13.4″N 106°24′59.9″W

Links
- Public license information: Public file; LMS
- Website: www.tudn.com/TUDN-radio

KSVE (1650 kHz) is an AM radio station licensed to El Paso, Texas. The station is owned by Entravision Communications. The station airs a Spanish-language sports format and is branded TUDN Radio El Paso.

== History ==
KSVE originated as the "expanded band" twin to a standard AM band station. On March 17, 1997, the Federal Communications Commission (FCC) announced that eighty-eight stations had been granted permission to move to newly available "Expanded Band" transmitting frequencies, ranging from 1610 to 1700 kHz, with KSVE (now KHRO) in El Paso authorized to move from 1150 to 1650 kHz. The expanded band station on 1650 kHz, also located in El Paso, was assigned the call letters KBIV on September 4, 1998. This call sign was changed to KHRO on February 25, 2005, and to KSVE on September 23, 2008.

The FCC initially allowed the original station and its expanded band counterpart to operate simultaneously for up to five years, after which owners would have to turn in one of the two licenses, depending on whether they preferred the new assignment or elected to remain on the original frequency. However, this deadline has been extended multiple times, and both stations have remained authorized. One restriction is that the FCC has generally required paired original and expanded band stations to remain under common ownership.
