= XHESW-FM =

Radio station in Ciudad Madera, Chihuahua

XHESW-FM/XESW-AM
- Ciudad Madera, Chihuahua; Mexico
- Frequencies: 96.1 MHz, 970 kHz
- Branding: Radio Madera

Programming
- Format: Full service

Ownership
- Owner: GRD Multimedia; (Radio Ciudad Madera, S.A.)

History
- First air date: 1963
- Former frequencies: 1300 kHz

Technical information
- Licensing authority: CRT
- Class: B1 (FM); B (AM)
- Power: 5 kW (day)
- ERP: 10 kW
- HAAT: 169.6 m (556 ft)
- Transmitter coordinates: 29°11′03″N 108°10′15″W

Links
- Website: www.radiomadera.com

XHESW-FM 96.1/XESW-AM 970 is a Mexican radio station in Ciudad Madera, Chihuahua. Known as Radio Madera, XHESW is owned by GRD Multimedia and carries a full service radio format. It is the only radio station in Ciudad Madera.

== History ==
XHESW began as daytimer XESW-AM 1300; this station received its concession in December 1963. On 1300, the station broadcast with one kilowatt of power. In 2008, the station moved to 970 and increased its power to five kilowatts.

In 2010, XESW received permission to move to FM, where it broadcasts 24 hours a day as XHESW-FM 96.1.
