= KVIV =

Radio station in El Paso, Texas

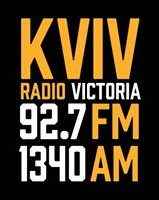
- El Paso, Texas; United States
- Frequency: 1340 kHz
- Branding: Radio Victoria

Programming
- Language: Spanish
- Format: Christian Radio

Ownership
- Owner: El Paso y Juárez Compañerismo-Cristiano

History
- First air date: December 3, 1949
- Former call signs: KSET (1948–1984); KALY (1984–1988)

Technical information
- Licensing authority: FCC
- Facility ID: 17740
- Class: C
- Power: 1,000 watts (day); 910 watts (night)
- Transmitter coordinates: 31°45′37″N 106°26′8″W
- Translator: 92.7 K224FC (El Paso)

Links
- Public license information: Public file; LMS
- Website: kviv1340.com

KVIV (1340 AM, "Radio Victoria") is a commercial radio station licensed to El Paso, Texas, United States. Owned by El Paso y Juárez Compañerismo-Cristiano, the station features a Spanish-language Christian radio format. It airs a mix of talk and teaching shows along with Christian music aimed at Spanish-speaking listeners in El Paso and across the border in Ciudad Juárez.

Programming is also heard on FM translator K224FC at 92.7 MHz.

== History ==
The station signed on the air on December 3, 1949. The original call sign was KSET. It added a sister station in 1958, 94.7 KSET-FM (now KYSE). For much of the 1960s and 70s, KSET-AM-FM simulcast a beautiful music format, playing quarter-hour sweeps of soft instrumental music.

KSET 1340 switched to KALY in 1984 and to its current call letters KVIV in 1988.
