= KELP-FM =

Radio station in Mesquite–Las Cruces, New Mexico

- Mesquite, New Mexico; United States
- Broadcast area: El Paso, Texas / Las Cruces, New Mexico
- Frequency: 89.3 MHz

Programming
- Format: Christian

Ownership
- Owner: Sky High Broadcasting, Inc.

History
- Call sign meaning: EL Paso

Technical information
- Licensing authority: FCC
- Facility ID: 93942
- Class: A
- ERP: 3,000 watts
- HAAT: 56 meters
- Transmitter coordinates: 32°05′05″N 106°44′01″W

Links
- Public license information: Public file; LMS
- Webcast: Listen Live
- Website: kelpradio.com

KELP-FM (89.3 MHz) is a radio station licensed to serve Mesquite, New Mexico, although the station's A-grade service contour covers almost the entire city of Las Cruces, New Mexico. The station is owned by Sky High Broadcasting, Inc. It airs a Christian radio format featuring a mix of local and syndicated programming.

== History ==
The station was initially applied for by brothers Keith Leitch and Kenneth Leitch, under their non-profit organization, Sky High Broadcasting. Keith was an intern for a local broadcast engineer in El Paso, Texas, Pete E. Meryl Warren III, the founder of KCIK-TV Channel 14 (now KFOX-TV) and KJLF-TV Channel 65 (now KTFN). The intent was for the station to be staffed by, and the programming to be provided by, Christian students at New Mexico State University, the Leitch brothers' Alma Mater. However, broadcast stations within the U.S./Mexico border zone are subject to approval by the government of Mexico, and the Leitch brothers had left the area by the time the station was approved by the Federal Communications Commission (FCC) and Mexican authorities. Keith Leitch also set up KORB-FM which broadcasts Christian music in the Santa Rosa, California vicinity.

Arnie McClatchey, the owner of KELP, and KROL (now KXPZ, after being sold by Mr. McClatchey and undergoing a format change), was appointed to the board of directors as the head of the board of Sky High Broadcasting, due to his expertise in Christian broadcasting in the local market, and oversaw getting the station on the air.

The station was assigned the KELP-FM call letters by the FCC on April 11, 2001.

== Translators ==
Broadcast translator for KELP-FM
Call sign	Frequency	City of license	FID	ERP (W)	Class	FCC info
K269GF	101.7 FM	El Paso, Texas	156979	10	D	LMS
