= XHBU-FM =

Radio station in Chihuahua, Chihuahua

- Chihuahua, Chihuahua; Mexico
- Frequency: 91.7 MHz
- Branding: La Norteñita

Programming
- Format: Regional Mexican

Ownership
- Owner: MegaRadio; (Radio XEBU, S.A. de C.V.)

History
- First air date: December 7, 1936 (concession)

Technical information
- Licensing authority: CRT
- Class: B1
- ERP: 25,000 watts
- HAAT: 110.1 m (361 ft)
- Transmitter coordinates: 28°36′07″N 106°08′19″W

Links
- Website: lanortenita917.mx

XHBU-FM is a radio station in Chihuahua, Chihuahua. Broadcasting on 91.7 FM, XHBU is owned by MegaRadio and brands as La Norteñita.

== History ==
XHBU received its concession on December 7, 1936, as XEBU-AM 620. It was owned by Feliciano López Islas, who founded XEFI-AM, until 1943, when it was sold to Enriqueta Gill. In 1951, Roberto Ogilvie Stevenson Torrijos bought XEBU.

In 1968, Grupo Radio Divertida bought XEBU, and the concessionaire name changed in 1976 to Radio Sistema de Chihuahua. In 2009, it was sold to MegaRadio.
