= KQBU (AM) =

Radio station in El Paso, Texas

Currently silent
- El Paso, Texas; United States
- Frequency: 920 kHz
- Branding: Lone Star Sports 920

Programming
- Format: Sports

Ownership
- Owner: Grupo Radio Centro; (97.5 Licensee TX, LLC)
- Sister stations: KAMA; KBNA-FM; XHTO-FM (operated from the US); other GRC stations in Ciudad Juárez

History
- First air date: 1947 (as KELP)
- Former call signs: KELP (1947–1982); KYSR (1982–1985); KDXX (1985–1987); KBNA (1987–2002); KZMR (2002); KAJZ (2002); KBNA (2002–2004); KLTO (2004); KBNA (2004–2007)
- Call sign meaning: "Que Buena" (former format)

Technical information
- Licensing authority: FCC
- Facility ID: 67065
- Class: B
- Power: 1,000 watts day; 360 watts night
- Transmitter coordinates: 31°44′09″N 106°22′24″W

Links
- Public license information: Public file; LMS
- Webcast: Listen live
- Website: lonestarsports920am.com

KQBU (920 kHz) is a silent AM radio station licensed to El Paso, Texas. It is owned by 97.5 Licensee TX, LLC, an American subsidiary of Grupo Radio Centro (GRC). The station had a sports radio format until it lost its tower site. It stopped broadcasting on September 19, 2022.

== History ==
=== KELP and KBNA ===
The station received its first license, as KELP. It signed on in 1947 as a 1,000 watt daytime-only station. After ownership by Paso Broadcasting Company and Trinity Broadcasting Corporation, it was sold to noted Top 40 programmer Gordon McLendon in 1954. McLendon added a couple of transmission towers in order to add night authority with 500 watts power, as well as to add an antenna for a new TV station, KILT. The old tower site was 4530 Delta Drive on the property used for the city of El Paso sewage treatment plant.

In 1957, KELP and its TV station were sold to KELP Radio Corporation, which changed the TV station's calls to KELP-TV. Sales of KELP-AM-TV to Northern Pacific Radio Corporation (in 1961) and John B. Walton (in 1966), and of the AM station to Clear Channel Communications (in 1977), followed.

On August 20, 1982, KELP became KYSR. In 1987 the station became KBNA, marking its first Spanish-language format as "K-Buena".

The station was relocated to its current site in 1989-1990 by then-station engineer David Stewart and then-director of Engineering Marvin Fiedler. The phasing equipment was designed by Harry Seabrooke at Silliman and Silliman, and built by Fiedler and Stewart.

=== Expanded band assignment ===
On March 17, 1997, the Federal Communications Commission (FCC) announced that 88 stations had been given permission to move to newly available "Expanded Band" transmitting frequencies, ranging from 1610 to 1700 kHz. KBNA was authorized to move from 920 to 1680 kHz.

The station would be able to boost daytime power to 10,000 watts and nighttime power to 1,000 watts. However, the station never procured the construction permit needed to implement the authorization, so the expanded band station was never built.

=== Univision ownership ===
Univision Radio would come into owning KBNA as well as KBNA-FM 97.5 and KAMA (750 AM). The station was assigned the KQBU call sign on December 11, 2007.

In January 2009, Univision partnered with El Paso Media Group to provide an English language morning talk radio format, known as TalkBack Radio. Infighting between competing factions resulted in a host lineup change in early April 2009 and Univision canceling the talk radio format on April 15, 2009. By 2016, KQBU was airing national programs from the Univision America talk network.

=== Grupo Radio Centro ownership ===
In 2016, Univision Radio exited El Paso by selling its stations to affiliates of Mexican radio broadcaster Grupo Radio Centro for $2 million, with GRC taking over operations via LMA on November 8. Rafael Márquez, a United States citizen, owns 75 percent of the licensee, 97.5 Licensee TX, LLC, with the remainder being owned by Grupo Radio Centro TX, LLC. Under GRC ownership, KQBU became a simulcast of KBNA-FM.

On September 13, 2018, KQBU dropped the KBNA-FM simulcast and changed its format to sports, branded as "Lone Star Sports 920". It used programming from CBS Sports Radio.

On September 19, 2022, KQBU ceased operations. The station lost its tower site and was unable to find another tower at a reasonable cost to relocate.
