= XHDI-FM =

Radio station in Chihuahua, Chihuahua, Mexico

- Chihuahua, Chihuahua; Mexico
- Frequency: 88.5 MHz
- Branding: @FM (Arroba FM)

Programming
- Format: English and Spanish contemporary hit radio

Ownership
- Owner: Grupo Radiorama; (Difusoras de Chihuahua, S.A. de C.V.)
- Sister stations: XHFA-FM, XHFI-FM

History
- First air date: July 28, 1971 (concession; 1994 (FM combo)
- Former call signs: XEDI-AM
- Former frequencies: 1360 kHz

Technical information
- Licensing authority: CRT
- Class: B
- ERP: 10,000 watts
- HAAT: 100.54 m (329.9 ft)
- Transmitter coordinates: 28°40′14.4″N 106°04′58.2″W (FM); 28°36′35.8″N 106°03′00.5″W (AM)

Links
- Webcast: Listen live
- Website: arroba.fm nuestrasnoticiaschihuahua.com

XHDI-FM is a radio station on 88.5 FM in Chihuahua, Chihuahua. XHDI carries the @FM English and Spanish contemporary hit radio format from Grupo Radiorama.

== History ==
XEDI received its concession on July 28, 1971, becoming an FM combo in 1994. In the 1990s, it broadcast music in English as Éxtasis Digital until 2004, when it was moved to XEHES-AM 1040. This made way for an affiliation Televisa Radio and the launch of the Los 40 Principales pop format in the market. The station continued as pop but dropped the franchise in 2009, becoming known as La Nueva with a Regional Mexican format, and later as Arroba FM in 2016.
