= XHNZ-FM =

Radio station in Ciudad Juárez, Chihuahua, Mexico

Coordinates: 31°40′15.1″N 106°31′09.8″W

- Ciudad Juárez, Chihuahua; Mexico
- Broadcast area: El Paso, Texas and Ciudad Juárez, Chihuahua
- Frequency: 107.5 FM
- Branding: La Poderosa

Programming
- Format: Regional Mexican

Ownership
- Owner: Grupo Radiorama; (XHNZ-FM, S.A. de C.V.)
- Sister stations: XEJ-AM, XHIM-FM, KINT-FM

History
- First air date: February 9, 1987

Technical information
- Licensing authority: CRT
- Class: C
- ERP: 57,500 Watts
- HAAT: 423.6 m (1,390 ft)

Links
- Webcast: Listen live
- Website: radiorama.mx

XHNZ-FM (107.5 MHz) is a radio station in Ciudad Juárez, Chihuahua, Mexico. It is owned by Grupo Radiorama and known as La Poderosa with a Regional Mexican format.

== History ==
XHNZ received its concession in 1987. It was owned by Radiofonia Mexicana, S.A., a subsidiary of Radiorama. However, for most of the late 2000s and early 2010s, XHNZ was operated by Grupo Radio México and carried its La Zeta Regional Mexican format.

In 2010, XHNZ was sued by announcer Michael Buffer for using his trademark catchphrase "Let's Get Ready to Rumble" without permission for $175,000(USD). Buffer found out that XHNZ had used his catchphrase 42 times between February and March 2010 through the station being a monitored reporter in Billboard's Regional Mexican Airplay panel via BDS. After the radio station failed to respond to the lawsuit and a summons issued the following April, Buffer's El Paso lawyer Mark Walker obtained a default judgment. On July 6, District Judge David Briones ordered the radio station to pay $4,166.67 for each of the 42 unauthorized uses of the trademark alleged by Buffer, as well as legal fees, according to court documents.

In November 2015, GRM ceased operating XHNZ and XHIM-FM, also owned by Radiorama. XHNZ became "La Poderosa".
