= KAMA (AM) =

Radio station in El Paso, Texas

- El Paso, Texas; United States
- Broadcast area: El Paso metropolitan area - Ciudad Juárez
- Frequency: 750 kHz
- Branding: Mix 92.7

Programming
- Format: English contemporary hit radio

Ownership
- Owner: Pro Radio LLC; (97.5 Licensee TX, LLC)
- Sister stations: KBNA-FM, XHTO-FM, XHEM-FM

History
- First air date: July 11, 1985

Technical information
- Licensing authority: FCC
- Facility ID: 36948
- Class: B
- Power: 10,000 watts (day); 1,000 watts (night)
- Transmitter coordinates: 31°46′30″N 106°16′48″W
- Translator: 92.7 K224FC (El Paso)

Links
- Public license information: Public file; LMS
- Webcast: Listen live
- Website: mixelpaso.com

KAMA (750 kHz) is a commercial radio station in El Paso, Texas. It is owned by 97.5 Licensee TX, LLC, and operated by Pro Radio LLC. It broadcasts an English-language contemporary hit radio format for the nearby El Paso metropolitan area and across the border in Ciudad Juárez.

By day, KAMA is powered at 10,000 watts. But at night, to avoid interfering with other stations, it reduces power to 1,000 watts. AM 750 is a clear channel frequency reserved for Class A WSB Atlanta, KFQD Anchorage and CBGY Newfoundland. That requires KAMA to use a directional antenna at all times with a two-tower array in the daytime and four towers at night. Programming on KAMA is also heard on 99-watt FM translator K224FC at 92.7 MHz.

== History ==
=== Early years ===
The station signed on the air on July 11, 1985. It served as a relocation of KAMA, which had been at 1060 AM and it aired a Spanish-language format with a heritage stretching to Juárez's XELO-AM. The move to 750 allowed KAMA to broadcast around the clock. (The 1060 frequency had been for daytime use only due to a more powerful station on 1060 in Mexico City. A new El Paso station was later created at 1060, KFNA although that is now dark.)

In 1994, KAMA 750 was sold to Tichenor Media, operator of longtime rival Spanish-language station KBNA. Tichenor merged into Heftel Broadcasting in 1997, changed its name to Hispanic Broadcasting Corp. in 2000.

=== Univision ownership ===
In 2003, Hispanic Broadcasting Corp. merged into Univision Communications. Univision is a large owner of Spanish-language television and radio stations across the U.S.

For a time, beginning in 2012, KAMA was the El Paso outlet for the national Univision America talk network. That programming later moved to sister station KQBU at 920 AM.

=== Grupo Radio Centro ===
In 2016, Univision Radio exited El Paso radio market. It sold its stations to affiliates of Mexican radio broadcaster Grupo Radio Centro for $2 million, with GRC taking over operations via local marketing agreement (LMA) on November 8. Rafael Márquez, a United States citizen, owns 75 percent of the licensee, 97.5 Licensee TX, LLC, with the remainder being owned by Grupo Radio Centro TX, LLC.

On November 1, 2022, Pro Radio LLC took over the local programming and marketing agreement from Grupo Radio Centro TX. In December 2024, 97.5 Licensee TX, LLC, entered into an LMA with Big Bend Broadcasting for an FM translator. It took control of K224FC at 92.7 MHz and began to simulcast the programming on KAMA 750 AM.

On January 3, 2025, KAMA 750 AM and 92.7 FM started broadcasting a new format, combining syndicated hot talk programs with Spanish-language hot adult contemporary music.

On March 1, 2026, the station switched to an English-language contemporary hit radio format as it assumed the programming of XHTO-FM and rebranded as Mix 92.7, emphasizing the FM translator in its branding. The last song played as a Spanish-language radio station was "Todo Cambió" by Mexican pop band "Camila", leading to the end of its long-time Spanish-language broadcasting history. And while the first song played on the radio station's current name, "Mix 92.7" was "I Just Might" by Bruno Mars.
