= XHDP-FM =

Radio station in Ciudad Cuauhtémoc, Chihuahua

- Ciudad Cuauhtémoc, Chihuahua; Mexico
- Frequency: 89.7 FM
- Branding: La Ranchera de Cuauhtémoc

Programming
- Format: Ranchera

Ownership
- Owner: Grupo BM Radio; (Eber Joel Beltrán Zamarrón)

History
- First air date: June 7, 1976 (concession)
- Former call signs: XEDP-AM
- Former frequencies: 710 kHz

Technical information
- Licensing authority: CRT
- Class: C1
- ERP: 10 kW
- HAAT: 503.5 m (1,652 ft)
- Transmitter coordinates: 28°22′22.44″N 107°03′22.15″W

Links
- Webcast: Listen live
- Website: gbmradio.com

XHDP-FM is a radio station on 89.7 FM in Ciudad Cuauhtémoc, Chihuahua, Mexico. The station is owned by Grupo BM Radio, the radio business of the Beltrán Montes family, and carries a ranchera format known as La Ranchera de Cuauhtémoc.

== History ==
Logo used before 2018

XHDP began as XEDP-AM 710, receiving its concession on June 7, 1976, and becoming the first station in Grupo BM Radio. The 5 kW daytimer later began broadcasting at night; by the AM-FM migration, it was operating at 7 kW day and 100 watts night.

It migrated to FM in 2011, originally receiving the 92.9 frequency that became XHER-FM in a swap between the two related stations.

XHDP originates one program for all of the BM stations statewide, "Cuestión de Minutos", which airs on Sunday mornings and was hosted by Israel Beltrán Montes until his 2022 death.
