= Radio Universidad (Chihuahua) =

University radio station in the state of Chihuahua

XHCPDB-FM/XHRU-FM
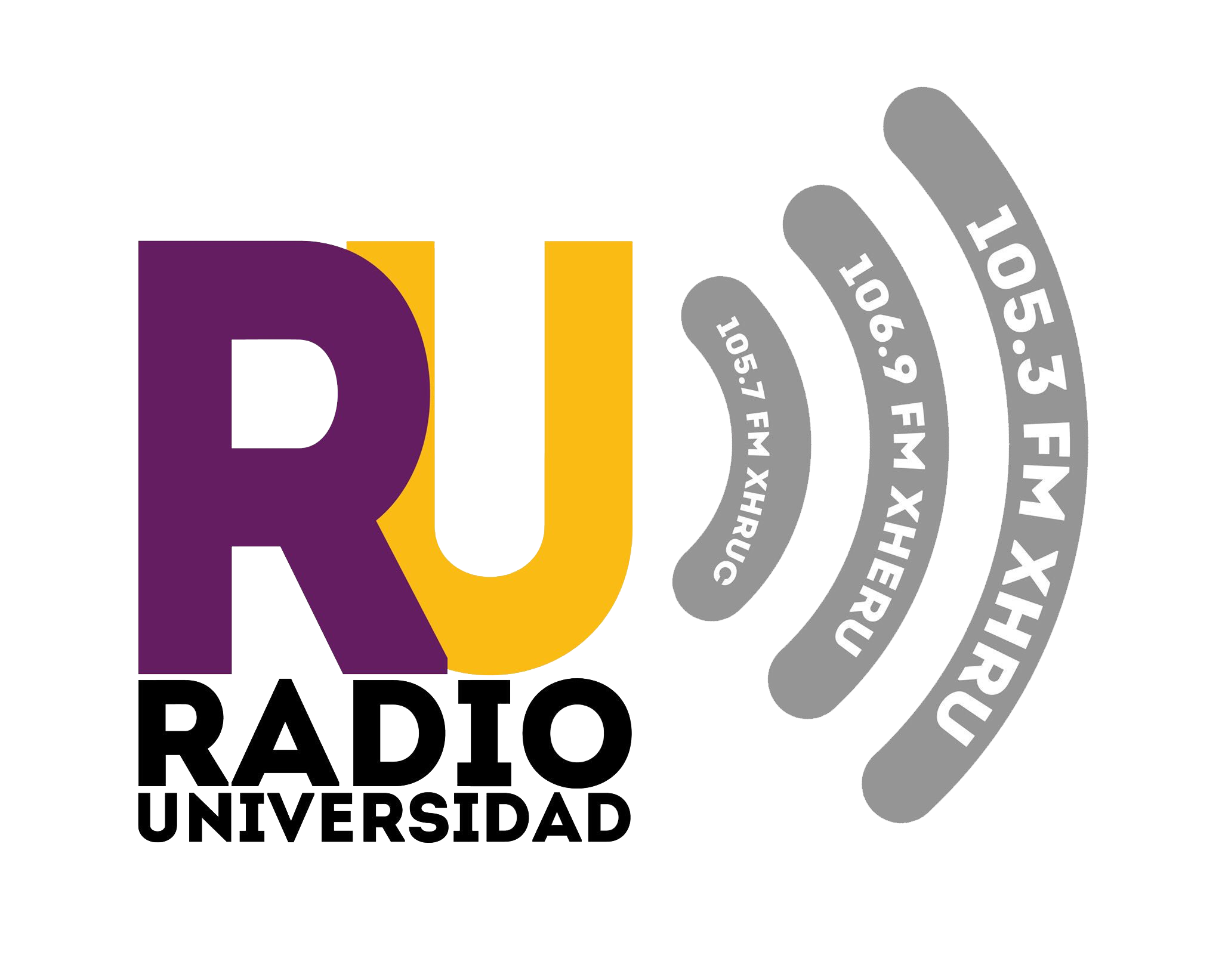
- Chihuahua, Chihuahua; Mexico
- Broadcast area: Chihuahua
- Frequencies: 88.1 and 105.3 MHz
- Branding: Radio Universidad

Programming
- Format: College Radio

Ownership
- Owner: Universidad Autónoma de Chihuahua

History
- First air date: May 21, 1957 (AM and shortwave); March 25, 2000 (105.3 FM); August 13, 2014 (106.9 FM)
- Last air date: 1972 (shortwave); August 28, 2015 (AM)
- Former call signs: XERUU (shortwave, 1957-72); XERU-AM (1957–2013); XHERU-FM (2013 - 2024)
- Call sign meaning: Radio Universidad

Technical information
- Licensing authority: CRT
- Class: A (88.1 FM); B1 (105.3 FM)
- ERP: 3,000 watts (88.1 FM); 15,000 watts (105.3 FM)
- HAAT: −25.8 m (−85 ft) (88.1 FM) −39.33 m (−129.0 ft) (105.3 FM)

Links
- Webcast: 105.3 FM; 88.1 FM; Cuauhtémoc; Delicias; Hidalgo del Parral
- Website: ru.uach.mx

Radio Universidad is the radio service of the Universidad Autónoma de Chihuahua in Chihuahua, Chihuahua. It broadcasts on XHCPDB-FM 88.1 FM and XHRU-FM 105.3 FM.

== History ==
=== First era of Radio Universidad: 1957-72 ===
The first graduates of the Universidad Autónoma de Chihuahua had not yet graduated when the permit for XERU-AM 1310 kHz was issued on May 21, 1957. Then-rector Luis Raúl Flores Sánchez was one of the important exponents of the cultural radio project. The UACh radio station also received a shortwave counterpart, XERUU at 6140 kHz. The original studios were located in the Fine Arts Building, on what is today Campus 1, while the transmitter tower was on property belonging to the Instituto Tecnológico de Chihuahua. The two locations were connected by a studio-transmitter link prone to failing in high winds.

Early programming included some initial efforts at distance education, such as the "radio schools" program that saw programs being transmitted over shortwave to small communities without their own schools. Four hours a day, five days a week were devoted to the radioescuelas, while the rest of the station in the 1960s and early 1970s included a wide variety of musical programming. Meanwhile, the transmitter was moved closer to the Fine Arts Building, on land that would later be used to construct the university gym.

In the summer of 1972, a strike at UACh's preparatory unit would lead to the station going off the air and not returning until 1989; the 1972 strike also marked the definitive end of the shortwave service.

=== Radio Universidad returns: 1989-97 ===
On November 14, 1989, XERU-AM returned to the air after an absence of more than 17 years. Radio Universidad now had new studio facilities in a different building; the transmitter was also relocated. After a forced closure that began in July 1993 and came about due to technical problems and the need to restructure the station's departments, Radio Universidad returned on April 9, 1994, with the slogan "A New Signal for You" (Una Nueva Señal para Tí) and a more modern programming concept.

=== Into the FM era ===
In the 1990s, the UACh, understanding that the radio station needed to be modernized, began to seek a permit to operate an FM radio station. The official request for a permit was made in November 1997, and the official permit was issued on September 2, 1998, for XHRU-FM 105.3, with 3 kW ERP. With the permit, the station began to acquire the equipment to put an FM station on the air. The Central Library would house the transmitter, donated through an agreement with the state government. Finally, in March 2000, 105.3 FM came to air with a program schedule that partly simulcast its AM counterpart.

In the late 2000s, the Universidad Autónoma de Chihuahua solicited authorization to move XERU-AM to the FM band as part of the AM-FM migration scheme. The new FM station would be located on 106.9 FM and bear the XHERU-FM callsign. As part of 60th anniversary celebrations for the university, 106.9 FM came to air on August 13, 2014. A year later, the AM station was shut down after nearly six decades of service.

=== Statewide expansion ===
In 2015, UACh obtained a public concession to expand its signal outside of the capital city for the first time, to Ciudad Cuauhtémoc on XHRUC-FM 105.7, with 3 kW ERP; this station signed on at the end of 2016.

After 10 years of waiting, the IFT approved concessions to the university for two additional stations, XHPEFK-FM 89.1 Hidalgo del Parral and XHPEDL-FM 92.1 Ciudad Delicias, in early 2019.

A failure to timely renew the 11-year concession led the Federal Telecommunications Institute (IFT) to issue a new one, with call sign XHCPDB-FM, effective at the end of 2023, at which time Radio Universidad moved. The new concession specified 88.1 MHz; 106.9 was not reawarded because, in 2014, Article 90 of the new Federal Telecommunications and Broadcasting Law designated 106–108 MHz as a reserved band for community and indigenous stations.

== Programming ==
105.3 and 88.1 FM carry separate programming; 1310 repeated 88.1 in its final year of operation. Programming includes university news, cultural programs, and music.

== Stations ==
Callsign	Frequency	City	Power
XHCPDB-FM	88.1 MHz	Chihuahua, Chihuahua	25 kW
XHRU-FM	105.3 MHz	Chihuahua, Chihuahua	15 kW
XHRUC-FM	105.7 MHz	Ciudad Cuauhtémoc	3 kW
XHPEFK-FM	89.1 MHz	Hidalgo del Parral	3 kW
XHPEDL-FM	92.1 MHz	Delicias	3 kW
