= XHPCHO-FM =

Radio station in Guachochi, Chihuahua

- Guachochi, Chihuahua; Mexico
- Frequency: 92.7 FM
- Branding: La Patrona

Programming
- Format: Regional Mexican

Ownership
- Owner: Grupo Bustillos Radio; (Humberto Bustillos Castillo)
- Sister stations: XHPGUA-FM

History
- First air date: September 27, 2017
- Call sign meaning: GuaCHOchi

Technical information
- Licensing authority: CRT
- Class: B1
- ERP: 25 kW
- HAAT: 27.8 m (91 ft)
- Transmitter coordinates: 26°49′29.2″N 107°03′41.8″W

Links
- Website: XHPCHO on Facebook

XHPCHO-FM is a radio station on 92.7 FM in Guachochi, Chihuahua. It is known as La Patrona.

== History ==
XHPCHO was awarded in the IFT-4 radio auction of 2017 alongside XHPGUA.

The stations began transmissions on September 11, 2017, with a formal inauguration on September 27 attended by Governor Javier Corral.
