= XHSB-FM =

Radio station in Hidalgo del Parral, Chihuahua

- Santa Bárbara, Chihuahua; Mexico
- Broadcast area: Parral, Chihuahua
- Frequency: 94.9 FM
- Branding: Éxtasis Digital

Programming
- Format: English classic hits

Ownership
- Owner: Grupo Radiorama; (Radio Santa Bárbara, S.A. de C.V.)
- Sister stations: XHEHB-FM

History
- First air date: June 18, 1947 (concession)
- Call sign meaning: "Santa Bárbara"

Technical information
- Licensing authority: CRT
- Class: B
- ERP: 10 kW
- HAAT: 193.11 m (633.6 ft)
- Transmitter coordinates: 26°57′31.3″N 105°41′11″W

Links
- Webcast: Listen live
- Website: extasisdigital.mx

XHSB-FM is a radio station on 94.9 FM in Santa Bárbara, Chihuahua, serving Hidalgo del Parral. It is owned by Grupo Radiorama and carries its Éxtasis Digital format.

== History ==
XESB-AM on 820 kHz received its concession on June 18, 1947. The Santa Bárbara-based station was owned by Domingo Salayandia Nájera and predated his other station, XEGD, by five years.

After Salayandia's death, his successors sold the concession to Radio Santa Bárbara, a business of Arnoldo Rodríguez Zermeño, in 2004. Zermeño ultimately sold his Chihuahua stations to Radiorama. Prior to migrating to FM, the AM station had changed frequencies to 810 kHz.

XHSB logo from 2019-22 as Arroba FM

As a result of the expiration of the concession of XHHHI-FM 99.3, Arroba FM moved to XHSB, sharing time with the existing Éxtasis Digital format, on July 1, 2019. In February 2022, the station switched to a full-time Éxtasis Digital format.
