= XHEAT-FM =

Radio station in Hidalgo del Parral, Chihuahua, Mexico

Defunct

Hidalgo del Parral, Chihuahua; Mexico
- Frequency: 102.5 FM

Programming
- Format: Silent

Ownership
- Owner: Adalberto Gutiérrez Meléndez
- Operator: Multimedios Radio
- Sister stations: XHHPR-FM

History
- First air date: 1935
- Last air date: March 21, 2019

Technical information
- Class: B1
- ERP: 7.5 kW
- Transmitter coordinates: 26°55′38.81″N 105°37′39.09″W

XHEAT-FM was a Mexican radio station broadcasting on 102.5 FM in Hidalgo del Parral, Chihuahua. It last was owned by Adalberto Gutiérrez Meléndez and operated by Multimedios Radio with its Hits FM pop format.

== History ==
XEAT-AM 1250 was Parral's first station, beginning broadcasts in 1935. It would not be until December 27, 1941, that Jorge Pérez received the concession. The 250-watt station, after 1943 owned by his widow Dolores Porras Vda. de Pérez, remained such for decades until its move to FM. Adalberto Gutiérrez Meléndez acquired XEAT in 1984.

In August 2017, XHEAT and XHHPR-FM swapped formats, with XHEAT flipping from La Caliente to Hits FM.

As a result of the expiration of its concession, XHEAT-FM left the air at 12:01 am on March 21, 2019. The closure of the station left seven employees out of a job.
