= XHER-FM =

Radio station in Ciudad Cuauhtémoc, Chihuahua, Mexico

- Ciudad Cuauhtémoc, Chihuahua; Mexico
- Frequency: 92.9 FM
- Branding: Euforia

Programming
- Format: Pop

Ownership
- Owner: JB Multimedia; (Eber Joel Beltrán Zamarrón)

History
- First air date: October 15, 1954 (concession)
- Call sign meaning: Original owner Eduardo Rivas

Technical information
- Licensing authority: CRT
- Class: B1
- ERP: 9.52 kW
- HAAT: 140.4 m (461 ft)
- Transmitter coordinates: 28°23′57.6″N 106°51′08.7″W

Links
- Webcast: Listen live
- Website: gbmradio.com

XHER-FM is a radio station on 92.9 FM in Ciudad Cuauhtémoc, Chihuahua, Mexico. The station is owned by JB Multimedia, the radio business of the Beltrán Montes family, and carries a pop format known as Euforia.

== History ==
XHER-FM began as XEER-AM 990, receiving its broadcasting concession on October 15, 1954. The original owner was Eduardo Rivas Trujillo. The station migrated to FM in 2011 and was initially assigned the 89.7 MHz frequency, which later became XHDP-FM following a frequency swap between the two related stations.

In 1986, Martha Consuelo Trujillo Mendoza assumed management of the station. Leadership transitioned to Israel Beltrán Zamarrón in 2015. In 2022, Berenice Beltrán Berlanga became the station's concessionaire, followed by Eber Joel Beltrán Zamarrón in 2023.
