= WBLF =

Radio station in Bellefonte–State College, Pennsylvania

Coordinates: 40°54′12″N 77°46′06″W

- Bellefonte, Pennsylvania; United States
- Broadcast area: State College, Pennsylvania
- Frequency: 970 kHz
- Branding: 106.5 WBLF

Programming
- Format: Classic hits
- Affiliations: Fox News Radio

Ownership
- Owner: Jeffry and Mark Schlesinger; (Schlesinger Communications, Inc.)

History
- First air date: August 1, 1958
- Call sign meaning: Bellefonte or Betty Lou Finnegan

Technical information
- Licensing authority: FCC
- Facility ID: 17317
- Class: D (AM & FM)
- Power: 1,000 watts daytime; 61 watts nighttime
- ERP: 250 watts (FM)
- Translator: 106.5 W293DX (Bellefonte)

Links
- Public license information: Public file; LMS
- Webcast: Listen live
- Website: www.wblfradio.com

WBLF (970 AM) is a classic hits radio station licensed to Bellefonte, Pennsylvania serving State College, Pennsylvania. It is currently owned by Jeffry and Mark Schlesinger, through licensee Schlesinger Communications, Inc. WBLF was founded by Cary H. Simpson on August 1, 1958, and operates at the federally assigned frequency of 970 kilohertz with a maximum power output of 1,000 watts daytime, 61 watts at night.

== Early history ==
WBLF was one of the original nine stations built by the Allegheny Mountain Network in Tyrone, Pennsylvania, with the construction permit first issued on May 28, 1958, for a daytime-only station.

Though many believe that the WBLF call letters stand for its city of license, it is speculated that Simpson named the station after his wife, the former Betty Lou Finnegan, who was part owner of the AMN until her death in 2000. WBLF originally operated at the frequency of 1330 kHz and at a power of 500 watts. Studios were first planned to be located at the corner of Spring and High Streets in Bellefonte, but that was changed to 107 North Allegheny Street. Transmitter facilities were located along Blanchard Street Extension in Spring Township, just outside the Bellefonte Borough limits.

In October 1967, the station was granted pre-sunrise authorization to operate at 500 watts no more than two hours before local sunrise, enabling the station to sign on the air at 6am on a consistent basis. In December 1969, WBLF applied for a frequency change from 1330 to the much stronger channel of 970 kHz, but with the same daytime and pre-sunrise power output.

In November 1976, WBLF was granted permission to double its daytime power to one thousand watts. In 1989, the station was granted limited nighttime power of 61 watts, which allowed it to remain on the air 24 hours if desired. The station was sold by Allegheny Mountain Network to Clark-Richards Broadcasting for $105,000 in April 1993, and studios were moved to 751 S. Eagle Valley Road in Bellefonte. The station was sold again to Citadel Communications Corporation in May 1997, and then changed hands again in September 1999 as it was sold to Marathon Media, and studios again were moved, this time to 160 Clearview Avenue in State College. This ownership was also short-lived, as the station was sold to Dame Broadcasting in March 2000. Independent programming for WBLF was abandoned, with the station rebroadcasting new AM sister station WRSC, which was the news/talk/sports station for the State College market.

== Recent history ==
For many years prior to the summer of 2005, WBLF simulcast programming on State College's WRSC. This allowed residents in Northern Centre County to receive WRSC's programming, especially in the evening and at night. In March 2005, then owner Dame Broadcasting sold its radio stations in the State College market (including WBLF) to 2510 Licenses, LLC. During this change in ownership, the simulcast was discontinued, and WBLF aired placeholder programming. In June 2005, WBLF was sold by 2510 to Magnum Broadcasting, Inc., a local operator and owner of four other Pennsylvania radio stations, including the Philipsburg licensed QWiK Rock.

== Relaunch ==
In October 2005, WBLF relaunched as a separate talk station, the first station in the State College market in direct competition with long-established talk station WRSC. As part of the launch, WBLF hired former WRSC broadcaster Jeff "Ironhead" Byers, who had just returned to State College following a brief period in Punxsutawney at WPXZ. Byers performed a morning show alongside Centre County personality Tor Michaels, who had also worked at WRSC in the past. Byers and Michaels were joined by newcomers Jennifer MacIsaac and Todd Brown. The original WBLF weekday lineup included original local affairs programming in the morning with MacIsaac, Michaels and Byers, Rush Limbaugh and Thom Hartmann in the afternoon, original local sports programming with Brown in the late afternoon, and Phil Hendrie in the evening. During not otherwise scheduled programming (overnights and often on the weekend), WBLF aired the Fox Sports Radio feed. National news is provided at the top and bottom of the hour by Fox News Radio.

The previous talk programming schedule was revamped slightly in late March 2007. It now includes "Centre County This Morning," a live, local morning news and information program with Jerry Fisher.

On Monday, June 16, 2008, WBLF inaugurated In The Zone with Ironhead, a new live local sports talk show hosted by Jeff Byers. As of July 2009 WBLF airs Meyers and Hartman, a sports talk show from Fox Sports Radio hosted by Chris Myers and Steve Hartman, in the time slot previously held by In The Zone.

While WBLF's main competitor WRSC features a nearly entire lineup of conservative hosts such as Glenn Beck, Sean Hannity, Michael Savage and Mark Levin, WBLF has a somewhat more balanced lineup, airing Alan Colmes of Fox in addition to conservatives Dennis Miller and Rush Limbaugh.

Effective August 31, 2020, Magnum Broadcasting sold WBLF, two sister stations, and a translator to Jeffry and Mark Schlesinger's Schlesinger Communications, Inc. for $1.05 million.

== Previous logo ==
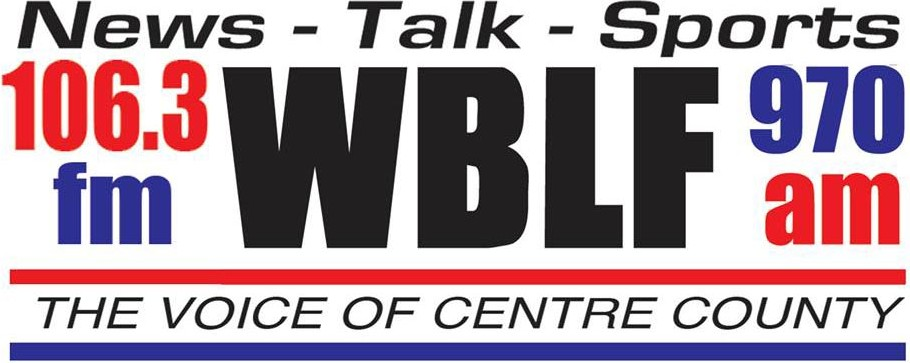

== Notes ==
https://www.allaccess.com/net-news/archive/story/192730/craven-curtis-named-om-at-magnum-state-college-pa
