= XHEHB-FM =

Radio station in Hidalgo del Parral, Chihuahua, Mexico

XHEHB-FM / XEHB-AM
- San Francisco del Oro, Chihuahua; Mexico
- Broadcast area: Parral, Chihuahua
- Frequencies: 104.7 FM; 730 AM
- Branding: La Más Picuda

Programming
- Format: Regional Mexican

Ownership
- Owner: Grupo Radiorama; (XEHB, S.A. de C.V.)
- Sister stations: XHSB-FM

History
- First air date: October 27, 1954 (concession)
- Former frequencies: 770 kHz; 107.1 MHz

Technical information
- Licensing authority: CRT
- Class: B1 (FM); B (AM)
- Power: 50,000 watts Day/1,000 watts Night
- ERP: 25 kW
- HAAT: 200.4 m (657 ft)
- Transmitter coordinates: 26°55′37″N 105°45′08″W

Links
- Webcast: Listen live
- Website: radioramaparral.mx

XHEHB-FM/XEHB-AM is a radio station on 104.7 FM and 730 AM in San Francisco del Oro Municipality, Chihuahua, Mexico, near Parral. It is owned by Grupo Radiorama and carries a Regional Mexican format known as La Más Picuda.

== History ==
XEHB-AM 770 received its concession on October 27, 1954. The San Francisco del Oro-based station was owned by Amador Aguilera Castañeda. In December 1985, ownership passed to Adalberto Gutiérrez Meléndez.

The 2000s and 2010s were a turbulent time for XEHB. In 2008, control passed to radio station owner Arnoldo Rodríguez Zermeño, and XEHB moved to 730 kHz with a new daytime power of 50 kW and 1 kW at night. 2012 saw authorization for the station's move to FM as XHEHB-FM 107.1. In 2014, Zermeño sold to the current concessionaire.

On January 31, 2022, the station changed frequencies to 104.7 MHz, as had been stipulated by the Federal Telecommunications Institute in 2019 to open space in the 106–108 MHz band for community and indigenous radio stations.
