= XETAR-AM =

SRCI radio station in Guachochi, Chihuahua

- Guachochi, Chihuahua, Mexico; Mexico
- Broadcast area: Chihuahua & Sinaloa & Durango
- Frequency: 870 kHz
- Branding: La Voz de la Sierra Tarahumara

Programming
- Format: Indigenous community radio

Ownership
- Owner: CDI – SRCI

History
- First air date: 11 November 1982
- Call sign meaning: TARahumara

Technical information
- Licensing authority: CRT
- Class: B
- Power: 10,000 watts (daytime only)
- Transmitter coordinates: 26°48′50.8″N 107°04′02.3″W

Links
- Webcast: XETAR-AM
- Website: XETAR-AM

XETAR-AM (La Voz de la Sierra Tarahumara – "The Voice of the Sierra Tarahumara") is an indigenous community radio station that broadcasts in Spanish, Tarahumara and Northern Tepehuán from Guachochi, in the Mexican state of Chihuahua. It is run by the Cultural Indigenist Broadcasting System (SRCI) of the National Commission for the Development of Indigenous Peoples (CDI). XETAR-AM broadcasts on the United States clear-channel frequency of 870 kHz.
