= XHHPR-FM =

Radio station in Hidalgo del Parral, Chihuahua, Mexico

- Hidalgo del Parral, Chihuahua; Mexico
- Frequency: 101.7 FM
- Branding: La Lupe

Programming
- Format: Spanish adult hits

Ownership
- Owner: Multimedios Radio; (Multimedios Radio, S.A. de C.V.)

History
- First air date: March 14, 1997 (concession)
- Call sign meaning: "Hidalgo del Parral"

Technical information
- Licensing authority: CRT
- Class: C1
- ERP: 30 kW
- HAAT: 182.6 m (599 ft)
- Transmitter coordinates: 26°55′38.81″N 105°37′39.09″W

Links
- Webcast: Listen live
- Website: mmradio.com

XHHPR-FM is a radio station on 101.7 FM in Hidalgo del Parral, Chihuahua, Mexico. It is owned by Multimedios Radio and carries its La Lupe Spanish adult hits format. The XHHPR-FM transmitter is located on Cerro Cuesta de los López.

== History ==
XHHPR received its concession on March 14, 1997. It has always been owned by Multimedios.

In August 2017, XHHPR and XHEAT-FM swapped formats, with XHHPR becoming the La Caliente station. XHEAT-FM closed down in early 2019.

Multimedios flipped XHHPR in June 2020 to its La Lupe Spanish adult hits format.
