= XHHHI-FM =

Radio station in Hidalgo del Parral, Chihuahua

Defunct

Hidalgo del Parral, Chihuahua; Mexico
- Broadcast area: Hidalgo del Parral, Chihuahua
- Frequency: 99.3 FM

Programming
- Format: Silent

Ownership
- Owner: Radiorama; (XEHHI-AM, S.A. de C.V.)

History
- First air date: November 16, 1988
- Last air date: June 30, 2019
- Call sign meaning: Chihuahua/Hidalgo del Parral

Technical information
- ERP: 10 kW
- Transmitter coordinates: 26°57′16.92″N 105°41′25.36″W

Links
- Website: www.arroba.fm/PARRAL/

XHHHI-FM was a radio station on 99.3 FM in Hidalgo del Parral, Chihuahua, Mexico. It was owned by Radiorama and last carried its @FM pop format.

== History ==
XEHHI-AM 640 received its concession on November 16, 1988. It was owned by Sistemas Populares de Comunicación, S.A. de C.V., owned by Arnoldo Rodríguez Zermeño. The concession was later transferred to Radio XEHHI-AM, S.A. de C.V., also owned by Zermeño. However, Zermeño opted to sell the station to Radiorama.

XEHHI received approval to migrate to FM in 2011. In 2015, its facilities moved to Cerro El Ángulo and the station decreased power from 25 kW to 10. The concession expired in 2018, and XHHHI signed off for good on June 30, 2019. Sister station XHSB-FM became a dual Arroba FM/Éxtasis Digital station with XHHHI's closure.
