= XEPZ-AM =

Radio station in Ciudad Juárez, Chihuahua

Simulcast with XHEPR-FM 99.1
- Ciudad Juárez, Chihuahua; Mexico
- Broadcast area: El Paso, Texas; Ciudad Juárez, Chihuahua
- Frequency: 1190 kHz
- Branding: Máxima

Programming
- Language: Spanish

Ownership
- Owner: Sistema Radio Lobo; (Radiorama de Juárez, S.A.)
- Operator: Francisco Antonio Muñoz Muñoz

History
- First air date: January 4, 1964
- Call sign meaning: X El PaZo

Technical information
- Licensing authority: CRT
- Class: B
- Power: 5,000 watts day 250 watts night

Links
- Webcast: Listen live
- Website: maximafm991.com

XEPZ-AM (1190 kHz) is a radio station in Ciudad Juárez, Chihuahua, Mexico, also serving El Paso, Texas. It is owned by Sistema Radio Lobo. The station simulcasts the pop format of XHEPR-FM 99.1 Máxima.

== History ==
XEPZ received its concession on January 4, 1964. It was owned by Rafael Fitzmaurice Beltrán del Río until 1973, when it was bought by Radiorama.

The station was originally known as "La Norteña", broadcasting a grouper format, then it left the La Norteña grupero format, flipping to Radio Centro 1190 in 2015, taking it away from XHEPR-FM. The station flipped to El Heraldo Radio on October 7, 2020., then returned to Radio Centro 1190 in 2021, the last year that Grupo Radio Centro operated the station.

On April 1, 2022, its operations, along with those of XHEPR-FM 99.1, passed to Francisco Antonio Muñoz Muñoz, owner of XHFAMA-FM of Camargo, and it began simulcasting XHEPR's new Máxima format.
