= WRCS =

- Ahoskie, North Carolina; United States
- Frequency: 970 kHz

Programming
- Format: Gospel Music

History
- First air date: 1948

Technical information
- Licensing authority: FCC
- Class: D
- Power: 1,000 watts day 80 Watts night
- Transmitter coordinates: 36°16′46″N 77°01′59″W

Links
- Public license information: Public file; LMS

WRCS (970 AM) is a radio station broadcasting a Gospel Music format. Licensed to Ahoskie, North Carolina, United States. The station is currently owned by WRCS-AM 970 Inc.
