= KTFN =

Television station in El Paso, Texas

- El Paso, Texas; United States
- City: El Paso, Texas
- Channels: Digital: 20 (UHF); Virtual: 65
- Branding: UniMás El Paso – Las Cruces

Programming
- Affiliations: 65.1: UniMás; for others, see § Subchannels

Ownership
- Owner: Entravision Communications; (Entravision Holdings, LLC)
- Sister stations: TV: KINT-TV; Radio: KHRO, KINT-FM, KOFX, KYSE

History
- First air date: June 22, 1991
- Former call signs: KJLF-TV (1991–1998); KKWB (1998–2002)
- Former channel numbers: Analog: 65 (UHF, 1991–2009); Digital: 51 (UHF, 2003–2019)
- Former affiliations: Independent (1991–1995); The WB (1995–2002); UPN (secondary, 1998–2002)
- Call sign meaning: Telefutura Network (former name of UniMás)

Technical information
- Licensing authority: FCC
- Facility ID: 68753
- ERP: 1,000 kW
- HAAT: 524 m (1,719 ft)
- Transmitter coordinates: 31°48′18.9″N 106°29′0.7″W

Links
- Public license information: Public file; LMS

KTFN (channel 65) is a television station in El Paso, Texas, United States, affiliated with the Spanish-language network UniMás. It is owned by Entravision Communications alongside Univision affiliate KINT-TV (channel 26). The two stations share studios on North Mesa Street/Highway 20 in northwest El Paso; KTFN's transmitter is located atop the Franklin Mountains on the El Paso city limits.

== History ==
The station first signed on the air with a live Petra concert on June 22, 1991, as KJLF-TV, which stood for "King Jesus Lives Forever". It originally served as an English-language outlet, formatted as religious independent station. The station was founded by Sara Warren and Pete E. Meryl Warren III—who had signed on KCIK-TV (channel 14, now KFOX-TV) in August 1979—and was run by the Warren family, with John Warren serving as the station manager. Initially, KJLF-TV ran mostly Christian-oriented programs mixed with several hours of secular programs such as sporting and hunting shows, westerns, some older sitcoms, public domain movies and low-budget barter cartoons. The original prime time lineup included Remington Steele, 21 Jump Street and Lou Grant. Gradually, the religious programming decreased and was replaced with more classic sitcoms and cartoons, causing the station to evolve into a more traditional independent. One notable original employee, Keith Leitch, began working in June 1991 at the age of 16 years old in master control and went on to start One Ministries, Inc., which purchased a full power TV station in the San Francisco TV market, KQSL.

KJLF became a charter affiliate of The WB upon the network's launch on January 11, 1995. The station was sold to White Knight Broadcasting in 1998. After KMAZ (channel 48, now KTDO) dropped its affiliation with UPN and switched to Telemundo in January 16 of that year, KJLF began carrying UPN programming as a secondary affiliation and acquired many of the syndicated programs that were part of KMAZ's inventory. On March 1, 1998, its call letters were changed to KKWB (in reference to the station's WB affiliation).

The station was sold to the Entravision Communications Corporation in 2001; White Knight had originally agreed to sell KKWB to Univision Communications, who assigned their right to acquire the station to Entravision that October. The sale was opposed by The WB, who filed a lawsuit seeking to block the sale and the concurrent sale of Killeen sister station KAKW to Univision, as KKWB's contract with The WB was not slated to expire until January 11, 2005, and the terms of the sales called for both stations to drop their WB affiliations in favor of Spanish-language programming supplied by Univision. On January 29, 2002, the station became an affiliate of TeleFutura (the forerunner of UniMás) and changed its callsign to KTFN in reflection of its new affiliation. After the switch, WB and UPN network programming in El Paso was provided on cable via their networks' flagship stations in Los Angeles; WB network programming was only available via KTLA, while UPN programming was only available via KCOP-TV—both of which were carried on Time Warner Cable in the area—for the remainder of their runs. This switch left southern New Mexico without a WB affiliate until February 2003, when KRWB-TV (a satellite of KWBQ) began broadcasting (albeit only to the southeastern portion of that state). The WB and UPN ceased operations in September 2006 and merged their programming as part of a joint venture between CBS Corporation and Time Warner to form The CW, whose affiliate is KVIA-TV (channel 7), which carries the network's CW Plus feed on its second digital subchannel.

== Technical information ==
=== Subchannels ===
The station's digital signal is multiplexed:

Subchannels of KTFN
Channel	Res.	Short name	Programming
65.1	1080i	Unimas	UniMás
65.2	480i	TruCrme	True Crime Network
65.3	480i	Quest	Quest
65.4	480i	EEE-TV	EEE Network
65.88	1080i	AltaVsn	AltaVision

Subchannel broadcast with MPEG-4 video

On July 8, 2012, KTFN announced that it would begin airing newfound TeleFutura competitor MundoFox (later MundoMax) on digital subchannel 65.2, when the network formally launched on August 13, 2012. However, the station began carrying the network upon MundoFox's soft launch two weeks earlier on August 1.

=== Analog-to-digital conversion ===
KTFN shut down its analog signal, over UHF channel 65, at noon on June 12, 2009, the official date on which full-power television stations in the United States transitioned from analog to digital broadcasts under federal mandate. The station's digital signal remained on its pre-transition UHF channel 51, using virtual channel 65.

After regular programming was discontinued on its analog signal, the station, as well as sister station KINT-TV, transmitted a repeated crawl in Spanish informing viewers about the digital transition and advising viewers of their options to continue receiving programming, which ran until KINT permanently ceased analog transmissions at 11:59 p.m.
