= XHPGUA-FM =

Radio station in Guachochi, Chihuahua, Mexico

- Guachochi, Chihuahua; Mexico
- Frequency: 91.1 FM
- Branding: La Patrona

Programming
- Format: Regional Mexican

Ownership
- Owner: Grupo Bustillos Radio; (Ana Cecilia Estrada Aguirre)
- Sister stations: XHPCHO-FM

History
- First air date: September 27, 2017
- Call sign meaning: Guachochi

Technical information
- Licensing authority: CRT
- Class: B1
- ERP: 25 kW
- HAAT: 27.8 m (91 ft)
- Transmitter coordinates: 26°49′16.31″N 107°04′09.1″W

Links
- Webcast: Listen live
- Website: lapatronaradio.com.mx

XHPGUA-FM is a radio station on 91.1 FM in Guachochi, Chihuahua, Mexico. It is known as La Patrona.

== History ==
XHPGUA-FM was awarded in the IFT-4 radio auction of 2017 alongside XHPCHO-FM.

The stations began transmissions on September 11, 2017, with a formal inauguration on September 27 attended by Governor Javier Corral.

In 2022, the station changed its branding to La Magia del Amor.

In 2026, the station changed its branding to La Patrona.
