= XEJCC-AM =

Simulcast of XHEM-FM 103.5
- Ciudad Juárez, Chihuahua; Mexico
- Frequency: 720 kHz
- Branding: La Z

Programming
- Format: Regional Mexican
- Affiliations: Grupo Radio Centro

Ownership
- Owner: Grupo Audiorama Comunicaciones; (Grupo Impulsor de Medios, S.A. de C.V.)
- Sister stations: XEJ-AM, XHEM-FM, XHTO-FM

History
- First air date: November 27, 1989
- Former frequencies: 1520 kHz (1989–2010)
- Call sign meaning: similar to sister station XEJ-AM

Technical information
- Licensing authority: CRT
- Class: B
- Power: 10 kW day
- Transmitter coordinates: 31°42′48″N 106°26′45.06″W

Links
- Webcast: Listen live
- Website: audiorama.mx

XEJCC-AM is a radio station on 720 AM in Ciudad Juárez, Chihuahua. It is operated by Grupo Audiorama Comunicaciones and is known as La Z with a Regional Mexican format.

== History ==
XEJCC received its concession on November 27, 1989. It operated on 1520 kHz, with a daytime power of 1,000 watts, and was owned by Ana Patricia Eulalia Núñez Cervera.

In 2006, Grupo Impulsor de Medios, owned by various executives of Radiorama, bought XEJCC. In March 2010, XEJCC was approved to move from 1520 to 720 kHz.

In October 2020, the station abandoned its separate format as El Fonógrafo to simulcast sister station XHEM-FM 103.5.
