= XHHES-FM =

Radio station in Chihuahua, Chihuahua, Mexico

- Chihuahua, Chihuahua; Mexico
- Frequency: 94.1 MHz
- Branding: La Patrona

Programming
- Format: Regional Mexican

Ownership
- Owner: Grupo Radiorama; (XEHES-AM, S.A. de C.V.)
- Operator: Grupo Bustillos Radio

History
- First air date: February 6, 1987 (concession)
- Former frequencies: 1040 kHz

Technical information
- Licensing authority: CRT
- Class: B1
- ERP: 25,000 watts
- HAAT: 30.23 m (99.2 ft)
- Transmitter coordinates: 28°36′53″N 106°03′16″W

Links
- Website: www.lapatronaradio.com.mx/chihuahua/

XHHES-FM is a radio station in Chihuahua, Chihuahua, Mexico. Broadcasting on 94.1 FM, XHHES is owned by Radiorama and operated by Grupo Bustillos Radio as La Patrona with a Regional Mexican format.

== History ==
XHHES began operations in 1987 as XEHES-AM 1040. In the 1990s and early 2000s, the station broadcast Christian programming as Radio Luz. In 2004, it became Éxtasis Digital, an English-language adult contemporary music format previously on XHDI-FM 88.5. In 2007, Éxtasis Digital moved to XEFO-AM 680, and 1040 AM became Radiorama Siglo XXI, a news/talk format.

XEHES received approval to migrate to FM in 2011. In 2013, Grupo BM Radio began operating XHHES with a pop format known as Estéreo Sensación.

In 2016, XHHES and XHUA-FM 90.1 switched formats and operation, with XHHES inheriting the longtime Estéreo Vida contemporary format.

In 2020, Grupo Bustillos Radio took over operation of XHHES-FM and flipped the station to its La Patrona format of Regional Mexican music.
