= XHRPC-FM =

Radio station in Chihuahua, Chihuahua

- Chihuahua City, Chihuahua; Mexico
- Frequency: 99.3 FM
- Branding: La Bestia Grupera

Programming
- Format: Grupera

Ownership
- Owner: Grupo Radiorama; (Red Nacional Radioemisora, S.A.)
- Operator: Grupo Audiorama Chihuahua

History
- First air date: March 25, 1961 (concession)

Technical information
- Licensing authority: CRT
- Class: B1
- ERP: 25,000 watts
- HAAT: 27.9 m (92 ft)
- Transmitter coordinates: 28°36′53″N 106°03′16″W

Links
- Webcast: Listen live
- Website: audioramachihuahua.mx/labestiagrupera

XHRPC-FM is a radio station on 99.3 FM in Chihuahua City, Chihuahua. It is owned by Grupo Radiorama and carries its grupera format known as La Bestia Grupera.

== History ==
XHRPC received its concession in 1961 as XERPC-AM 1420, owned by Radio T.V. Parral, S.A. It was sold to the Uranga family operating as Red Nacional Radioemisora in 1967; the move to 790 came not long after. Radiorama would later acquire the station, and it is currently operated by Grupo Audiorama, a related company.
