= XHEFO-FM =

Radio station in Chihuahua, Chihuahua, Mexico

- Chihuahua, Chihuahua; Mexico
- Frequency: 92.5 MHz
- Branding: Súper 92.5

Programming
- Format: Romantic

Ownership
- Owner: Grupo Radiorama; (Radiodifusoras Unidas de Chihuahua, S.A.)
- Operator: Grupo Bustillos Radio

History
- First air date: November 22, 1965 (concession)

Technical information
- Licensing authority: CRT
- Class: B1
- ERP: 25,000 watts
- HAAT: 42.8 m (140 ft)
- Transmitter coordinates: 28°40′08″N 106°04′56″W

Links
- Website: super925.mx

XHEFO-FM is a radio station in Chihuahua, Chihuahua, Mexico. Broadcasting on 92.5 FM, XHEFO is known as Súper 92.5.

== History ==
XHEFO began operations in 1965 as XEFO-AM 680. It was owned by Francisco Luis Medina and operated by the Uranga family. Radiorama acquired XEFO in the 1980s. In 2004, it became the franchise of the W Radio news format. In 2007, it switched to Éxtasis Digital, an English-language adult contemporary format previously on XEHES-AM 1040.

In 2011, XEFO started broadcasting on FM as XHEFO-FM 92.5. In 2017, XHEFO flipped to Súper, a pop format, when Grupo Audiorama Chihuahua replaced Radiorama as the operator of XHEFO in its entrance into Chihuahua. The station broke from Audiorama in late 2018, by which time the format had evolved in a romantic direction with the new operator being Grupo Bustillos Radio.
