= XEJ-AM =

Radio station in Ciudad Juárez, Chihuahua, Mexico

- Ciudad Juárez, Chihuahua; Mexico
- Broadcast area: El Paso–Juárez
- Frequency: 970 AM
- Branding: La J Mexicana

Programming
- Format: Classic Regional Mexican

Ownership
- Owner: Grupo Audiorama Comunicaciones; (Radiofónica del Norte, S.A.)
- Sister stations: XEJCC-AM, XHEM-FM, XHTO-FM

History
- First air date: May 17, 1930 (concession)
- Call sign meaning: XE Juárez

Technical information
- Licensing authority: CRT
- Class: B
- Power: 10,000 watts day 5,000 watts night

Links
- Webcast: Listen live
- Website: audiorama.mx

XEJ-AM (970 kHz) is a commercial radio station in Ciudad Juárez, Chihuahua, Mexico. It serves both Ciudad Juarez and El Paso, Texas, with a classic Regional Mexican radio format. It is owned by Grupo Audiorama Comunicaciones.

By day, XEJ broadcasts at 10,000 watts using a non-directional antenna. But to avoid interference at night to other stations on 970 AM, it reduces power to 5,000 watts.

== History ==
XEJ is among Ciudad Juarez's earliest broadcast stations. It signed on the air on May 17, 1930. XEJ received its first concession on December 1, 1932, the first day concessions were awarded for Mexican radio stations. Owned by Buttner Valenzuela y Compañía, XEJ was among the first Mexican radio stations outside of Mexico City. It broadcast on the split frequency of 1015 kilohertz. In 1937, XEJ was sold to Pedro Meneses y Hoyos.

In 1941, the North American Regional Broadcasting Agreement (NARBA) was enacted, moving the frequencies of many AM stations. XEJ switched to its now-familiar frequency of 970 kHz. Meneses built XEJ into a larger organization; his family established XEJ television in 1954 and other stations across Chihuahua. Mexican Broadcasting Co., S.A. became the concessionaire on May 2, 1957, and Radiofónica del Norte replaced MBC in 1977.
