= XHTO-FM =

Spanish-language contemporary hit radio station in Ciudad Juárez, Chihuahua, Mexico

Coordinates: 31°40′15.1″N 106°31′09.8″W

- Ciudad Juárez, Chihuahua; Mexico
- Broadcast area: El Paso metropolitan area Cuidad Juárez, Chihuahua
- Frequency: 104.3 MHz
- Branding: KY 104.3

Programming
- Format: Adult Hits

Ownership
- Owner: Grupo Audiorama Comunicaciones; (Frecuencia Modulada de Ciudad Juárez, S.A. de C.V.)
- Sister stations: XEJ-AM, XEJCC-AM, XHEM-FM

History
- First air date: 1968

Technical information
- Licensing authority: CRT
- Class: C1
- ERP: 28,710 watts
- HAAT: 423.6 m (1,390 ft)

Links
- Webcast: Listen live
- Website: audiorama.mx

XHTO-FM (104.3 FM "KY") is a radio station in Ciudad Juárez, Chihuahua, Mexico. It broadcasts an adult hits format for the nearby El Paso metropolitan area. It is owned by Grupo Audiorama Comunicaciones with studios and a transmitter in Ciudad Juárez.

== History ==
=== As an MVS Radio-owned ===
XHTO-FM was originally owned by Joaquín Vargas Gómez, founder of MVS Radio. It originally was an English-language adult contemporary outlet with Spanish-language station ID, promotionals and advertising as "Stereorey", and his motto was "La Máxima Dimensión en Radio".

=== Sale to Radiorama, and format changes ===
In 1977, the station was transferred to Frecuencia Modulada de Ciudad Juárez, S.A., which was later sold to Grupo Radiorama, and then changed to a full-Spanish-language Adult Contemporary outlet as "La Exitosa".

=== Changes under GRM/GRC and flip to an English-language format ===
Sometime in the 2000s, Grupo Radio México took control of XHTO-FM from Radiorama, which holds its concession and then changed it to an El Paso-focused English-language Top 40/CHR (Contemporary Hit Radio) format named "HitFM" in 2001. Before that change, the station was mainly aimed to a Ciudad Juárez listeners. By 2003, it shifted directions to rhythmic contemporary music to compete directly against KPRR. As of September 2013, the station returned to a mainstream CHR presentation, albeit still featuring a dance/rhythmic lean, and reports to Mediabase as a mainstream Top 40. In 2015, the merger of Grupo Radio México into co-owned Grupo Radio Centro resulted in GRC taking control of XHTO-FM.

=== Under Audiorama, and its pending format change ===
In 2020, Grupo Audiorama Comunicaciones took direct ownership, and through its American division PRO Radio, the operations of XHTO-FM, following Grupo Radio Centro's sale of its former cousin stations KBNA-FM, KQBU, and KAMA (historically owned by Univision Radio) to Luz María Rygaard.

==== Return to a Spanish-language format ====
In February 5, 2026, following the Hearing Designation Order for its American cousin stations, Grupo Audiorama Comunicaciones and Luz María Rygaard agreed to cut their ties between their stations, leading to the cancellation of the sale of 97.5 Licensee TX, LLC to PRO Radio, the creation of 97.5 Holdings TX, LLC and the end of the long-timed operation and programming agreement for XHTO-FM.

In February 26, 2026, The Facebook page of "The Real FitFam El Paso" posted that "HitFM" will move to the 92.7 frequency with "The Morning Mash with Johnny Kage and DJ Javi" starting March 2. That post was confirmed by the official Facebook page of "HitFM" hours later. However, XHTO-FM and its former cousin station KAMA didn't made any announcements about the move even if it was confirmed.

Three days later, in March 1, at midnight, that changes took effect, with the El Paso-focused English-language Top 40/CHR format moving to KAMA, but before that, HitFM was cut abruptly from XHTO-FM, leading it to PRO Radio and HitFM's demise, as that format after that move, changed its name to "Mix 92.7", Grupo Audiorama Comunicaciones taking its direct control, and return to being a Spanish-language radio station aimed to Ciudad Juárez listeners. The station then began stunting with a repeating multigenre 4-song playlist, beginning at that time with "Por Amarte Así" from Mexican singer Cristian Castro. At the same time, Grupo Audiorama Comunicaciones also made official to cut ties with Grupo Radio Centro for its remaining sister stations even if they decided in 2022 to stop operating them.

The station, following that events, and after a jockless soft-launch stunting, in April 6, 2026, the station began operating again from Ciudad Juárez as Spanish language-focused Bilingual Adult Contemporary outlet "KY 104.3". Its new programming was unveiled officially two months later, in June 1.

HITfm logo (until 2026).
