= XHFAMA-FM =

Radio station in Ciudad Camargo, Chihuahua

- El Refugio/Ciudad Camargo, Chihuahua; Mexico
- Frequency: 97.5 FM
- Branding: La Grandota

Programming
- Format: Grupera

Ownership
- Owner: Francisco Antonio Muñoz Muñoz

History
- First air date: April 27, 1950 (concession); 2010 (FM)
- Call sign meaning: Radio FAMA

Technical information
- Licensing authority: CRT
- Class: C
- ERP: 25 kW
- HAAT: 669.4 m (2,196 ft)
- Transmitter coordinates: 27°43′16.7″N 105°14′22.9″W

Links
- Website: lagrandota.com.mx/2019/

XHFAMA-FM is a radio station on 97.5 FM in Ciudad Camargo, Chihuahua. The station is known as La Grandota/Radio Fama.

== History ==
XHFAMA began as XECC-AM 960, with a concession awarded on April 27, 1950 to Hugo Piñera Limas. The station moved to 560 in the 1990s before migrating to FM.

The callsign change to XEFAMA-AM occurred in 2000, alongside the station's sale to Muñoz Muñoz. It migrated to FM in 2011 and was approved to relocate its transmitter and increase its station class in 2018.
