= KHRO =

Radio station in El Paso, Texas

Coordinates: 31°45′13″N 106°24′58″W

Simulcasting KINT-FM El Paso
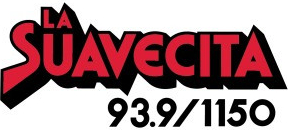
- El Paso, Texas; United States
- Broadcast area: El Paso metropolitan area
- Frequency: 1150 kHz
- Branding: La Suavecita 93.9/1150

Programming
- Format: Mexican regional adult hits

Ownership
- Owner: Entravision Communications; (Entravision Holdings, LLC)
- Sister stations: KYSE, KINT-FM, KOFX

History
- First air date: June 1958
- Former call signs: KIZZ (1958–1974); KISO (1974–1984); KKMJ (1984–1986); KEZB (1986–1992); KSVE (1992–1994); KINT (1994); KSVE (1994–2008)

Technical information
- Licensing authority: FCC
- Facility ID: 51705
- Class: B
- Power: 5,000 watts day; 380 watts night

Links
- Public license information: Public file; LMS
- Website: www.radiolasuavecita.com/el-paso/

KHRO (1150 AM) is a commercial radio station in El Paso, Texas. This station is owned by Entravision Communications. Its studio facilities are located on North Mesa Street/Highway 20 in northwest El Paso. The transmitter is located east of downtown in Ascarate Park, near Texas State Highway Loop 375. KHRO simulcasts the radio format heard on sister station KINT-FM (93.9 FM).

== History ==
The station first signed on in June 1958 as KIZZ. It was owned by Coronado Broadcasters and was affiliated with the CBS Radio Network. The station originally was a daytimer, powered at 1,000 watts, and required to sign off at sunset to avoid interfering with other stations on AM 1150. In the 1980s, it was given Federal Communications Commission (FCC) permission to broadcast around the clock, using 380 watts during nighttime hours. In the 1990s, the daytime power was boosted to 5,000 watts.

The station has gone through numerous formats over the years, including oldies, adult contemporary music, talk and Regional Mexican music.

=== Expanded Band assignment ===
On March 17, 1997, the FCC announced that 88 stations had been given permission to move to newly available "Expanded Band" transmitting frequencies, from 1610 to 1700 kHz. The then-KSVE was authorized to move from 1150 kHz to 1650 kHz.

The expanded band operation on 1650 kHz was assigned the call letters KBIV on September 4, 1998, which were changed to KHRO on February 25, 2005, and to KSVE on September 23, 2008.

The FCC initially provided that both the original station and its expanded band counterpart could optionally operate simultaneously for up to five years, after which owners would have to turn in one of the two licenses, depending on whether they preferred the new assignment or elected to remain on the original frequency. However, this deadline has been extended multiple times, and both KHRO on 1150 kHz and KSVE on 1650 kHz have remained authorized. One restriction is that the FCC has generally required paired original and expanded band stations to remain under common ownership.
