= XHFI-FM =

Radio station in Chihuahua, Chihuahua, Mexico

XHFI-FM / XEFI-AM
- Chihuahua City, Chihuahua; Mexico
- Frequency: 96.5 FM / 580 AM
- Branding: Éxtasis Digital

Programming
- Format: English classic hits

Ownership
- Owner: Grupo Radiorama; (El Vocero del Norte, S.A. de C.V.)

History
- First air date: December 14, 1923 (formal inauguration); 2011 (FM)
- Call sign meaning: Feliciano López Islas

Technical information
- Licensing authority: CRT
- Class: B1 (FM); B (AM)
- Power: 5 kW day/0.7 kW night
- ERP: 25 kW
- HAAT: 28.9 m (95 ft)
- Transmitter coordinates: 28°36′38″N 106°02′58″W

Links
- Webcast: Listen live
- Website: radiorama.mx

XHFI-FM 96.5/XEFI-AM 580 is a radio station in Chihuahua City, Chihuahua, Mexico. It is owned by Grupo Radiorama.

== History ==
"Estéreo Mexicana" logo used until 2017

XEFI was the first radio station in Chihuahua. It originated in 1921 as part of radio experiments conducted by the state government. By 1923, it was known as XICE, after Governor Ignacio C. Enríquez. In 1924, it became known as CFZ, and a full concession for XEFI at 1000 kHz was issued in 1932. In the 1940s, the station was transferred to El Pregonero del Estado de Chihuahua, S.A., owned by Ramiro G. Uranga; during this time, it operated at 1440 kHz. By the 1960s, the station had moved to 580.

In 1976, Radiorama bought the station, and in 2011, it received authorization to migrate to FM.

The station changed formats from Regional Mexican as "Fiesta Mexicana" in June 2020 to air Studio 96.5, a classic hits format. On May 6, 2024, XHFI was rebranded as Éxtasis Digital (previously used on 1040 AM until 2007 and 92.5 FM until 2017), preserving the English-language classic hits format.
