= KINT-FM =

Radio station in El Paso, Texas

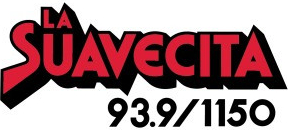
- El Paso, Texas; United States
- Broadcast area: El Paso metropolitan area; Ciudad Juarez
- Frequency: 93.9 MHz
- Branding: La Suavecita 93.9/1150

Programming
- Format: Mexican regional adult hits

Ownership
- Owner: Entravision Communications; (Entravision Holdings, LLC)
- Sister stations: KHRO, KOFX, KYSE, KINT-TV, KTFN

History
- Former call signs: KPAS (1974-92); KSVE (March 18–May 20, 1994)
- Call sign meaning: Shared with television station KINT-TV

Technical information
- Licensing authority: FCC
- Facility ID: 51709
- Class: C
- ERP: 100,000 watts
- HAAT: 433 meters (1,421 ft)
- Transmitter coordinates: 31°47′46″N 106°28′57″W
- Repeater: 1150 KHRO (El Paso)

Links
- Public license information: Public file; LMS
- Website: www.radiolasuavecita.com/el-paso/

KINT-FM (93.9 MHz) is a radio station in El Paso, Texas, also serving Las Cruces, New Mexico, and widely heard over the U.S.-Mexican border in Ciudad Juarez and surrounding communities. The station is currently owned by Entravision Communications. The station airs a radio format called "La Suavecita" It features Regional Mexican adult hits.

KINT-FM's studio facilities are located on North Mesa Street (Texas State Highway 20) in northwest El Paso, and its transmitter is located atop the Franklin Mountains in the El Paso city limits. KSVE (1650 AM) has at times simulcast KINT-FM.

== History ==
In 1975, a license was given for a new station on 93.9 FM in El Paso, KPAS. "94FM" was El Paso's original rock station but changed away from the format in 1981, chasing listeners toward KLAQ at 95.5. Prior to Spanish-language programing, this station also aired hot AC and CHR formats.

For the first time, in 1992, KPAS became KINT-FM. On March 18, 1994, the station changed its call sign to KSVE, only to revert to KINT-FM on May 20 of that year.

Originally owned by El Paso Broadcasting Corporation, the station sometime in the 1990s was sold to its current owner, Santa Monica-based Entravision Communications

Spanish-language programming began in 1994 with the original "La Caliente" format (also formerly occupied by an unrelated radio station XEJUA-AM, which flipped to La Lupe in 2020, leaving the brand completely out of the area) which broadcast Tejano music between 1994 and 1998; by then, the branding flipped to a Mexican Regional Top 40 format. That branding ended in 2007 in favor of Spanish-language variety AC "José FM" format, which ended on January 8, 2018, in favor of "La Suavecita" format, returning the Mexican Regional music to this station, this time as a Mexican Regional AC.
