= XHH-FM =

Radio station in Ciudad Juárez, Chihuahua, Mexico

- Ciudad Juárez, Chihuahua; Mexico
- Broadcast area: El Paso, Texas, United States
- Frequency: 100.7 MHz (HD Radio)
- Branding: Magia Digital 100.7

Programming
- Format: Regional Mexican

Ownership
- Owner: MegaRadio México; (Radio Estéreo XHH-FM, S.A. de C.V.)

Technical information
- Licensing authority: CRT
- Class: C
- ERP: 100,000 watts
- HAAT: 174.73 meters (573.3 ft)
- Transmitter coordinates: 31°42′14″N 106°29′54.6″W

Links
- Webcast: XHH listen live
- Website: magiadigital1007.fm

XHH-FM (100.7 MHz) is a Regional Mexican radio station serving the border towns of Ciudad Juárez, Chihuahua, Mexico (its city of license) and El Paso, Texas, United States (where it also maintains a sales office). It is owned by MegaRadio Mexico. The station is known on-air as Magia Digital 100.7.

XHH-FM broadcasts in HD.

== History ==
The station received its concession in 1968 to operate on 93.3 MHz, but it soon moved to its present frequency.
