= XHEM-FM =

Radio station in Ciudad Juárez, Chihuahua

Simulcast with XEJCC-AM 720
- Ciudad Juárez, Chihuahua; Mexico
- Broadcast area: Ciudad Juárez, Chihuahua; El Paso, Texas
- Frequency: 103.5 MHz
- Branding: La Z

Programming
- Format: Regional Mexican
- Affiliations: Grupo Radio Centro

Ownership
- Owner: Grupo Audiorama Comunicaciones; (Fronteradio, S.A.)
- Sister stations: XEJCC-AM, XEJ-AM, XHTO-FM

History
- First air date: 1970 (concession)
- Call sign meaning: Emmy Pinto Reyes (original concessionaire)

Technical information
- Licensing authority: CRT
- Class: B1
- ERP: 3,000 watts
- HAAT: 418.3 m (1,372 ft)
- Transmitter coordinates: 31°40′13″N 106°30′47″W

Links
- Website: audiorama.mx

XHEM-FM (103.5 FM) is a radio station in Ciudad Juárez, Chihuahua, Mexico. The station broadcasts a Regional Mexican format known as La Z.

== History ==
Planeta logo (until 2015)

Emmy Pinto Reyes, also the original owner of XHPR-FM in Veracruz, Veracruz, received the concession for XHEM in 1970.

La Z logo (until 2020)

Until 2015, XHEM carried the Planeta Spanish CHR format; La Z, which had been on XHNZ-FM 107.5, moved here after Grupo Radio México, a predecessor to Grupo Radio Centro outside Mexico City, stopped operating that station.

In 2022, Grupo Audiorama Comunicaciones took direct ownership and control of XHEM-FM and its sister stations: XHTO-FM, XEJ-AM and XEJCC-AM from Grupo Radio Centro, as they decided to stop operating that stations. However, XHEM-FM and its sister simulcast XEJCC-AM continued to broadcast as "La Z" under a branding license.

In February 2026, Grupo Audiorama Comunicaciones officially cut ties with Grupo Radio Centro, and it probably includes the license to use the "La Z" brand. However, Audiorama still use that brand for this station and only had plans to make a format change for its sister station XHTO-FM, but not immediately, as well has not for XHEM-FM and its other sister stations.
