= Guachochi =

City in the Mexican state of Chihuahua

- City
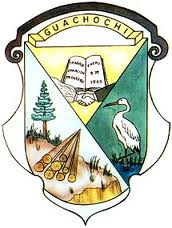
- Coat of arms

- Location in Chihuahua
- Coordinates: 26°49′10″N 107°4′12″W
- Country: Mexico
- State: Chihuahua
- Municipality: Guachochi
- Official Website: http://www.guachochi.com.mx
- Founded: Mid-18th century
- Elevation: 2,400 m (7,900 ft)

Population (2010)
  - Total: 14,513
- Postal code: 33180
- Area code: 649
- Demonym: Guachochiteco

Guachochi is a city in the south-western portion of the Mexican state of Chihuahua. The city of Guachochi serves as the municipal seat for the surrounding municipality of the same name. In 2023, Guachochi was designated a Pueblo Mágico by the Mexican government, recognizing its cultural and historical importance.

As of 2010, the city of Guachochi had a population of 14,513, up from 12,385 in 2005.

== Municipality ==
Guachochi is one of the 67 municipalities of Chihuahua, in northern Mexico. The municipal seat lies at Guachochi. The municipality covers an area of 4,340.35 km^{2}.

It was created by the State Congress on 31 December 1962, with its excision from the municipality of Batopilas.

As of 2010, the municipality had a total population of 49,689, up from 45,881 as of 2005.

As of 2010, the city of Guachochi had a population of 14,513. Other than the city of Guachochi, the municipality had 1,508 localities, the largest of which (with 2010 populations in parentheses) was: Samachique (1,241), classified as rural.

The municipality has 1,134 localities. The largest are:

Name	Population (2005)
Guachochi	12,385
Samachique	1,115
Norogachi	752
Rocheachi	729
Total Municipality	45,881

== History ==
The settlement was founded by Jesuit missionaries in the mid-18th century. In 1952 Guachochi, then only a small village, was chosen as the location of one of the first two Indigenous Centres of the National Institute of Indigenous Peoples (INI). It is the seat of the Roman Catholic Diocese of Tarahumara. The area around Guachochi is rich in history, and old Jesuit missions are kept in several communities. Guachochi was established in the middle of the 18th century as part of a mission, whose name was Guachochi. The original mission buildings no longer exist. Tónachi, Yoquivo, the temple of Our Lady of Loreto of Yoquivo, and the temple of Our Lady of Pilar de Norogachi, in Norogachi are places where old Jesuit buildings are still conserved.

== Media ==
Guachochi is home to XETAR-AM, a government-run community radio station that broadcasts to the local area in Spanish, Rarámuri and Tepehuano.
