= XEZOL-AM =

Radio station in Ciudad Juárez, Chihuahua, México

Ciudad Juárez, Chihuahua; Mexico
- Frequency: 860 kHz
- Branding: 860 Líder Informativo

Programming
- Format: News/talk

Ownership
- Owner: MegaRadio; (SIRTSA Sistema de Radio y Televisión, S.A. de C.V.)

History
- First air date: January 8, 1980

Technical information
- Power: 1 kW day/0.5 kW night

Links
- Webcast: https://stream.zeno.fm/wwsc28r91rhvv
- Website: www.860liderinformativo.mx

XEZOL-AM (860 kHz) is a radio station in Ciudad Juárez, Chihuahua. It is owned by MegaRadio Networks and known as Líder Informativo.

== History ==
XEZOL received its concession on January 8, 1980.

XEZOL as 860 Radio Noticias to September 2021

On September 6, 2021, XEZOL changed names from Radio Noticias to Líder Informativo.
