= XHFA-FM =

Radio station in Chihuahua, Chihuahua, Mexico

- Chihuahua, Chihuahua; Mexico
- Frequency: 89.3 MHz
- Branding: La Poderosa

Programming
- Format: Regional Mexican

Ownership
- Owner: Grupo Radiorama; (Impulsora de Radio de Chihuahua, S.A.)

History
- First air date: April 26, 1947; 1994 (FM)
- Former frequencies: 950 kHz (1947–2019)

Technical information
- Licensing authority: CRT
- Class: B1
- ERP: 10,000 watts
- HAAT: 100.54 m (329.9 ft)

Links
- Webcast: Listen live
- Website: radiorama.mx

XHFA-FM is a radio station in Chihuahua, Chihuahua, Mexico. It is owned by Grupo Radiorama and broadcasts a regional Mexican format on 89.3 FM.

== History ==
XEFA-AM 950 received its concession on April 26, 1947. It was owned by Red Nacional Radioemisora, S.A., and broadcast with 500 watts during the day and 250 at night. It was transferred to its current concessionaire in 1976 and authorized to become an AM-FM combo in 1994. XEFA-AM was surrendered on November 1, 2019.
