= KELP (AM) =

Radio station in El Paso, Texas

- El Paso, Texas; United States
- Broadcast area: El Paso metropolitan area
- Frequency: 1590 kHz

Programming
- Format: Christian radio

Ownership
- Owner: Cornerstone Broadcasting; (On Earth Media, LLC)

History
- First air date: April 10, 1959
- Former call signs: KINT (1959–1979); KKOL (1979–?); KELP (?–2006); DKELP (2006–2008)

Technical information
- Licensing authority: FCC
- Facility ID: 40831
- Class: B
- Power: 5,000 watts (day); 800 watts (night)
- Transmitter coordinates: 31°44′38.4″N 106°23′46.9″W
- Translator: 95.9 K240ER (El Paso)

Links
- Public license information: Public file; LMS
- Webcast: Listen live
- Website: kelpradio.com

KELP (1590 kHz) is a commercial radio station in El Paso, Texas, broadcasting a Christian radio format. It is owned by Cornerstone Broadcasting with the license held by On Earth Media, LLC. The studios and offices are on Commerce Avenue near Interstate 10 in El Paso.

The transmitter is on Springfield Drive in El Paso, near the United States-Mexico border. Programming is also heard on a 10-watt FM translator K240ER at 95.9 MHz.

== History ==
The station signed on the air on April 10, 1959. It was a daytimer, required to go off the air at night. The original call sign was KINT, powered at 1,000 watts. In 1969, it added a sister station, 97.5 KINT-FM (now KBNA-FM). The two stations simulcast a Top 40 format, playing popular hits for young listeners in El Paso. KINT-AM-FM were affiliates of the ABC Contemporary Network.

On May 7, 1979, the AM station changed its call letters to KKOL, switching to a middle of the road (MOR) format of popular adult music, news and sports, while KINT-FM 97.5 continued playing Top 40 hits. In the early 1980s, KKOL 1590 switched its call sign to KELP.

According to FCC records, the station was ordered off the air on July 12, 2006, due to an untimely filing of its license renewal. KELP noted that it had filed an application before the deadline, but admitted to not paying the renewal fee. It filed a new application with the application fee on that date. It had also sought special temporary authorizations to remain on-air, which it received. On February 15, 2008, the FCC granted KELP's license renewal.

== Programming ==
KELP carries both local and national religious leaders. KVIA-TV 7, the ABC network affiliate in El Paso, provides weather reports.
