= XEWR-AM =

Radio station in Ciudad Juárez, Chihuahua

- Ciudad Juárez, Chihuahua; Mexico
- Frequency: 1110 kHz
- Branding: Cristo Rey Radio (Christ the King)

Programming
- Format: Catholic radio

Ownership
- Owner: MegaRadio; (Radio Internacional de México, S.A.)
- Operator: Roman Catholic Diocese of Ciudad Juarez

History
- First air date: May 21, 1959

Technical information
- Licensing authority: CRT
- Class: D
- Power: 500 watts day

Links
- Webcast: Listen live
- Website: cristoreyradio.com

XEWR-AM (1110 kHz) is a non-commercial daytimer radio station in Ciudad Juárez, Chihuahua. It is known as Cristo Rey Radio (Christ the King) with a Catholic radio format programmed by the Roman Catholic Diocese of Ciudad Juárez. Because AM 1110 is a clear channel frequency, XEWR signs off the air at night, when radio waves travel farther.

== History ==
XEWR received its first concession on May 21, 1959. It was the founding station of what is today known as MegaRadio. The concessionaire has remained the same throughout XEWR's history.

In January 2008, XEWR flipped to its current Catholic religious format. It had previously been an English-language oldies station, Classic 1110.
