= XEJPV-AM =

Radio station in Ciudad Juárez, Chihuahua, Mexico

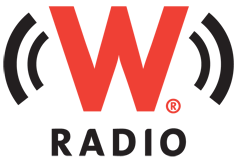
- Ciudad Juárez, Chihuahua; Mexico
- Frequency: 1560 AM
- Branding: W Radio

Programming
- Format: Talk radio
- Affiliations: Radiópolis

Ownership
- Owner: MegaRadio; (Radio Video de la Frontera, S.A. de C.V.)

History
- First air date: 1968
- Call sign meaning: José de Jesús Partida Villanueva (original concessionaire)

Technical information
- Licensing authority: CRT
- Class: D
- Power: 1,000 watts days only

Links
- Website: megaradio.mx

XEJPV-AM (1560 kHz) is a daytimer radio station in Ciudad Juárez, Chihuahua, Mexico. It is owned by MegaRadio and is known as W Radio. It airs a talk radio format, with most programs originating at XEW in Mexico City.

XEJPV broadcasts at 1,000 watts but must go off the air between sunset and sunrise to avoid causing interference to two Class A stations. AM 1560 is a clear channel frequency reserved for stations in New York City and Bakersfield, California.

== History ==
Logo used as Radio Viva

The history of XEJPV begins with a concession awarded in 1968 for the station to José de Jesús Partida Villanueva, who would later own two television stations: XHAUC-TV in Chihuahua City, Chihuahua and XHTX-TV in Tuxtla Gutiérrez, Chiapas.

From 1997 to 2017, XEJPV was known as Radio Viva with a Christian radio format. This ended to make way for a sports radio format known as Radio Deportiva. On August 31, 2020, it changed to the W Radio talk format with programming from W Radio.

Logo used as Radio Deportiva
