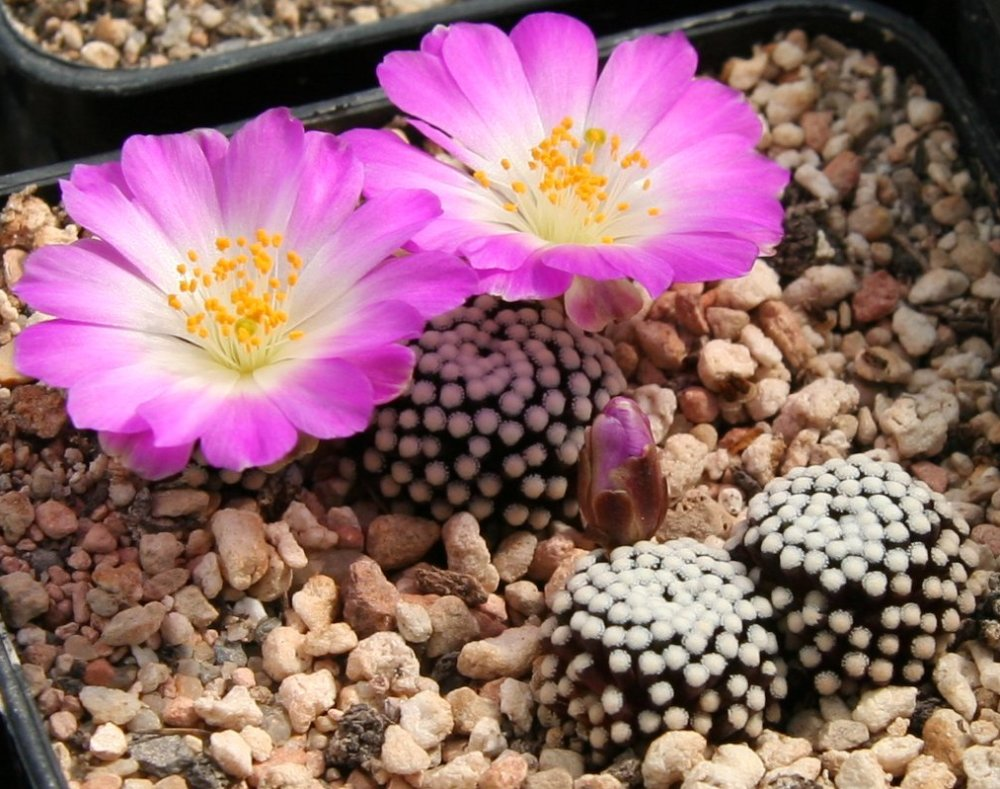

Conservation status
- Vulnerable (IUCN 3.1)

Scientific classification
- Kingdom: Plantae
- Clade: Tracheophytes
- Clade: Angiosperms
- Clade: Eudicots
- Order: Caryophyllales
- Family: Cactaceae
- Subfamily: Cactoideae
- Genus: Mammillaria
- Species: M. luethyi

Binomial name
- Mammillaria luethyi G.S.Hinton

= Mammillaria luethyi =

Species of cactus

Mammillaria luethyi is a species of cactus endemic to the Mexican state of Coahuila. The plants are miniature, shaped like balls and covered with tiny white spines and, throughout the summer, large magenta flowers.

The species entered scientific discourse in 1952, when Oklahoma professor Norman Boke found the hitherto undescribed cactus blooming on Mrs Crosby's windowsill. The plants were sent to Ladislaus Cutak of the Missouri Botanical Garden for research, but died soon after arrival. For 44 years the species was known solely from a couple of photographs and Cutak's description, captivating cactus experts.

The species was finally rediscovered, growing sunken in the gravel on limestone slabs in the Chihuahuan Desert, by George S. Hinton and Jonas Lüthy in 1996. The exact locations are kept secret to protect the wild populations from poaching. The International Union for Conservation of Nature lists it as a vulnerable species because of its limited distribution. Shortly after the discovery, the species entered ornamental plant trade through sustainable propagation efforts and became one of the most widely cultivated Mammillaria species.

== Taxonomy ==
Mammillaria luethyi was the subject of a 44-year-long mystery. In April 1952, Norman Boke, a cactus expert and professor at the University of Oklahoma, stopped at Mrs Crosby's Hotel in Ciudad Acuña, Coahuila, and there discovered an unusual dwarf cactus with pink flowers growing in a 1 lb (0.45 kg) coffee can. A mining prospector had found a few specimens and given them to Esther Crosby. Intrigued, Boke photographed the cactus and sent the images to Ladislaus Cutak of the Missouri Botanical Garden for identification. Cutak, captivated by its unique features, contacted Crosby and obtained two specimens. They arrived in a poor condition due to the delay and fumigation at the Mexico-US border; Cutak photographed them, and they soon died. Although all that remained were photographs, the cactus was mentioned in eight publications between 1952 and 1995.

For 44 years scientists could observe the mysterious cactus only in these photographs by Cutak (left) and Boke (right).

In his 1952 publication, Cutak compared the plant to Turbinicarpus valdezianus, but refrained from placing it into any genus. He described it as "one of the tiniest and daintiest cacti in existence". Though he planned a trip to rediscover it in Mexico, no follow-up occurred. The first to publish the photographs, in 1959-61, was the horticulturist Curt Backeberg, who tentatively placed it in Neogomesia. By the time Cutak photographed them, the plants had been deformed from improper growing conditions, which made it even more difficult to identify the genus.

The plant collectors Charlie Glass and Bob Foster correctly suggested in 1978 that the cactus in the photographs might be a species of Mammillaria. In 1991, the botanists Helia Bravo Hollis and Hernando Sánchez Mejorada treated it as Normanbokea valdeziana. In the publications of Backeberg and Bravo-Hollis & Sánchez-Mejorada, the photograph was rotated 90°, giving the misleading impression that the cactus flowered apically (from the top) rather than laterally (from the side), potentially influencing its classification as Normanbokea.

Despite the widespread circulation of these photos, the cactus's identity and precise origin remained a mystery, sparking speculation among cactus enthusiasts. Finally, in 1996, George S. Hinton and Jonas Lüthy found the cacti after Lüthy studied the map of Coahuila. Hinton described it as Mammillaria luethyi, naming the species after Lüthy, who had "after a flash of intuition pointed to its exact location on his map and spoke, 'This is where the plant grows.'"

Mammillaria luethyi belongs to the series Herrerae of the genus Mammillaria, alongside species like M. humboldtii, M. herrerae, M. albiflora, and M. sanchez-mejoradae. These species all have sunken fruits, numerous white radial spines, and are restricted to limestone habitats in eastern Mexico. The closest relative and closest neighbor of M. luethyi is M. sanchez-mejoradae. The two differ in spine arrangement and texture (plumose or pectinate in M. sanchez-mejoradae) and flower color (white in M. sanchez-mejoradae). M. luethyi bears a superficial resemblance to M. saboae from the series Longiflorae, but the latter favors volcanic rock and has different spination and larger flowers.

== Description ==
Mammillaria luethyi is a morphologically uniform species with minimal variability. It grows either singly or in clusters with up to seven heads. The stems are rounded to flat, about 1.5 cm wide, and barely rise above the ground. The underground stem is carrot-like, conical, and succulent, tapering to a base about 6 mm wide.

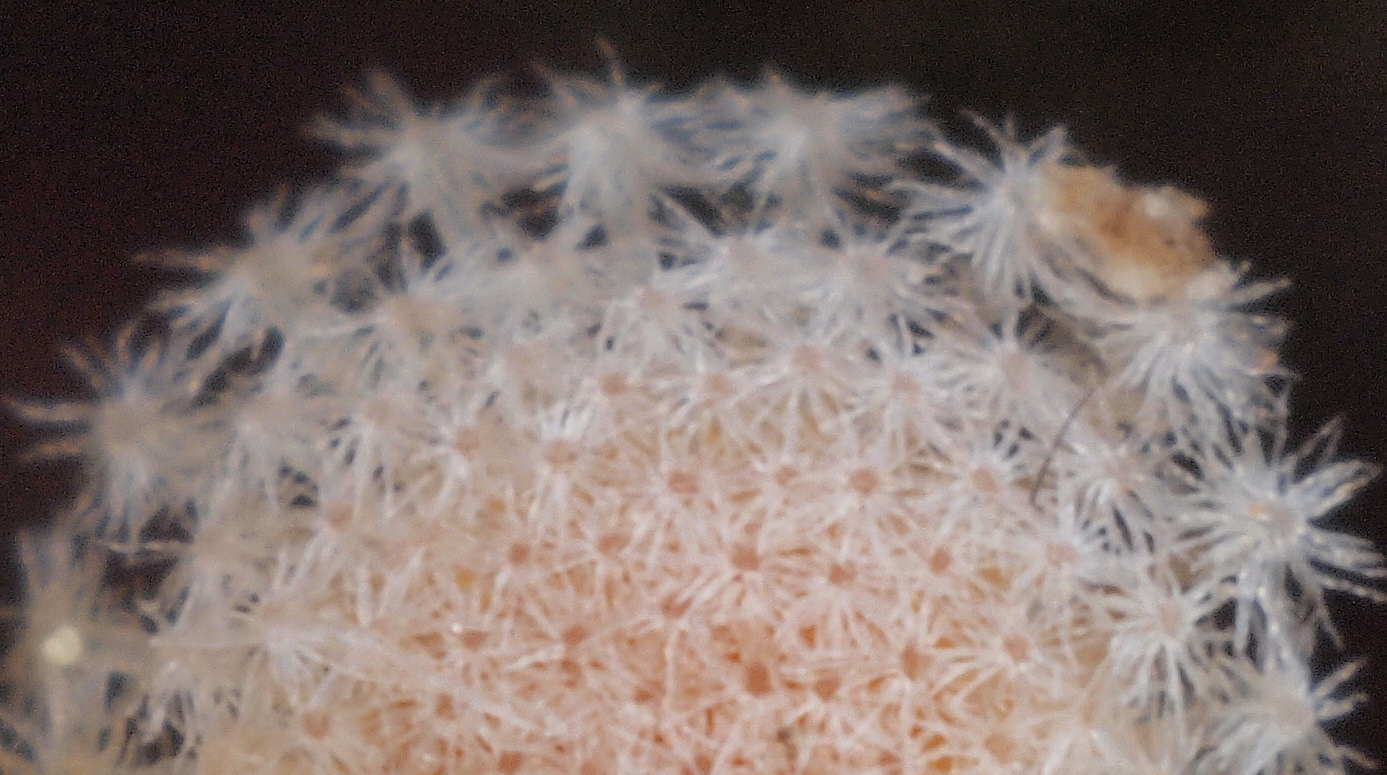
The umbrella-shaped spine tips, which make the areoles look like clusters of tiny stars, are unique in the cactus family.

The bumps on the plant's body, called tubercles, are slender, cylindrical, up to 5.5 mm long and 1.3 mm wide, dark green with reddish or whitish bases that dry and fall off underground. Each tubercle is densely covered with up to 80 tiny white spines, arranged in flat clusters 1.3–1.8 mm wide that completely cover the top of the plant (apex). The spines are 0.4–0.6 mm long, with the uppermost slightly longer and translucent. Some spines radiate outward, forming a small umbrella-like shape at the tip. Under intense magnification, the areole resembles a cluster of tiny stars. This branching of the spines makes M. luethyi one of the most recognizable Mammillaria species and unique among all known cacti.

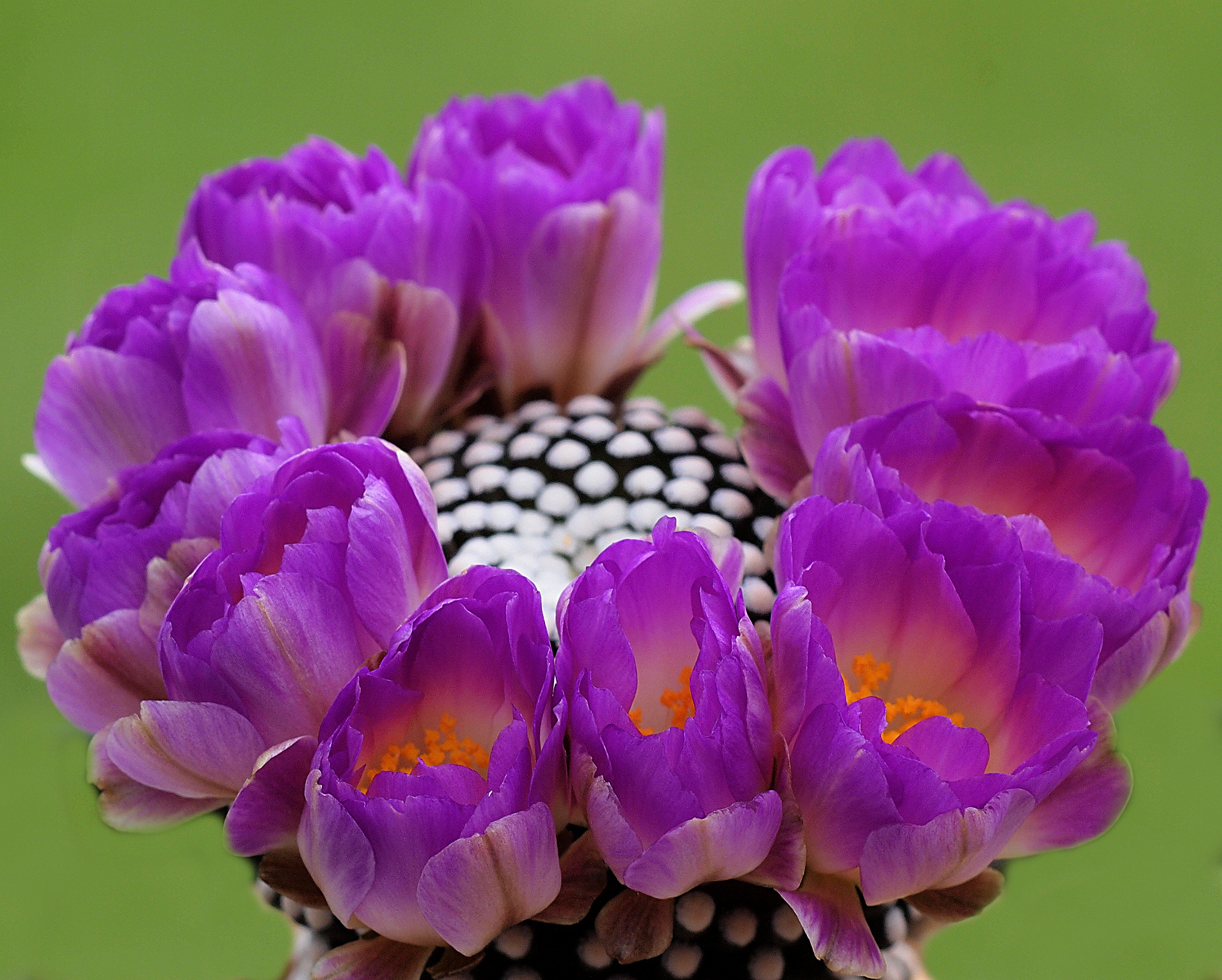
The apex is completely covered by the tiny spines and–in the summer–rimmed with flowers.

Flowers are up to 3 cm long and wide (twice as wide as the stems), with a striking color combination, featuring magenta petals, a white throat, yellow to orange anthers, and a greenish stigma. It is highly floriferous, blooming through most of the summer and often with so many flowers that the plant body is almost entirely obscured. Pure white flowers have been reported in cultivation, but are extremely rare and have never been observed in the wild. The fruits are round (4.5 mm in diameter), yellow-green to reddish-green, and mostly hidden in the stem. When they dry, they leave a hollow filled with up to 15 seeds. The seeds are black, round, about 1 mm long, with a finely textured surface and a slightly oval shape.

== Distribution and habitat ==
Mammillaria luethyi is found in the Chihuahuan Desert in the north of the Mexican state of Coahuila, at elevations of around 800 m. These plants thrive on horizontal slabs of limestone, nestled deeply within an extremely shallow substrate just 1.5–2.0 cm thick, composed of sandy clay and fine gravel, with which the tiny plants blend. They grow alongside Selaginella wrightii, Neolloydia conoidea, Bouteloua gracilis, and various lichens. Surrounding their microhabitats is the characteristic vegetation of the Chihuahuan Desert, dominated by species such as Agave lechuguilla, Dasylirion, Escobaria tuberculosa, Fouquieria splendens, Glandulicactus uncinatus, and Yucca species including Y. elata.

Hinton and Lüthy elected to keep the exact locations of Mammillaria luethyi in the wild secret to preserve the wild populations. When the species was first described in 1996 it was thought to exist at only one location, where less than 200 individuals were estimated to grow, and was thus assessed as an endangered species by the International Union for Conservation of Nature (IUCN). A new location was discovered in 2006, with an estimated population of many thousands of individuals. It is currently listed by the IUCN as a vulnerable species. The conservation status assessors believe that if the two locations became known, the threat from amateur collectors would lead to the species quickly becoming critically endangered or extinct. Hinton and Lüthy predicted in 2007 that there were more populations in the wild; a third was discovered by 2017, confirming their belief.

== Cultivation ==
Because the publication of Geohintonia mexicana earlier in the 1990s was followed by illegal collection of the plants, Hinton published his 1996 description of Mammillaria luethyi in Phytologia, a botanical journal, rather than in a specialized cactus journal. The rediscovery of the species thus went unnoticed by cactus enthusiasts until 1998, when it was publicized in the Cactus and Succulent Journal.

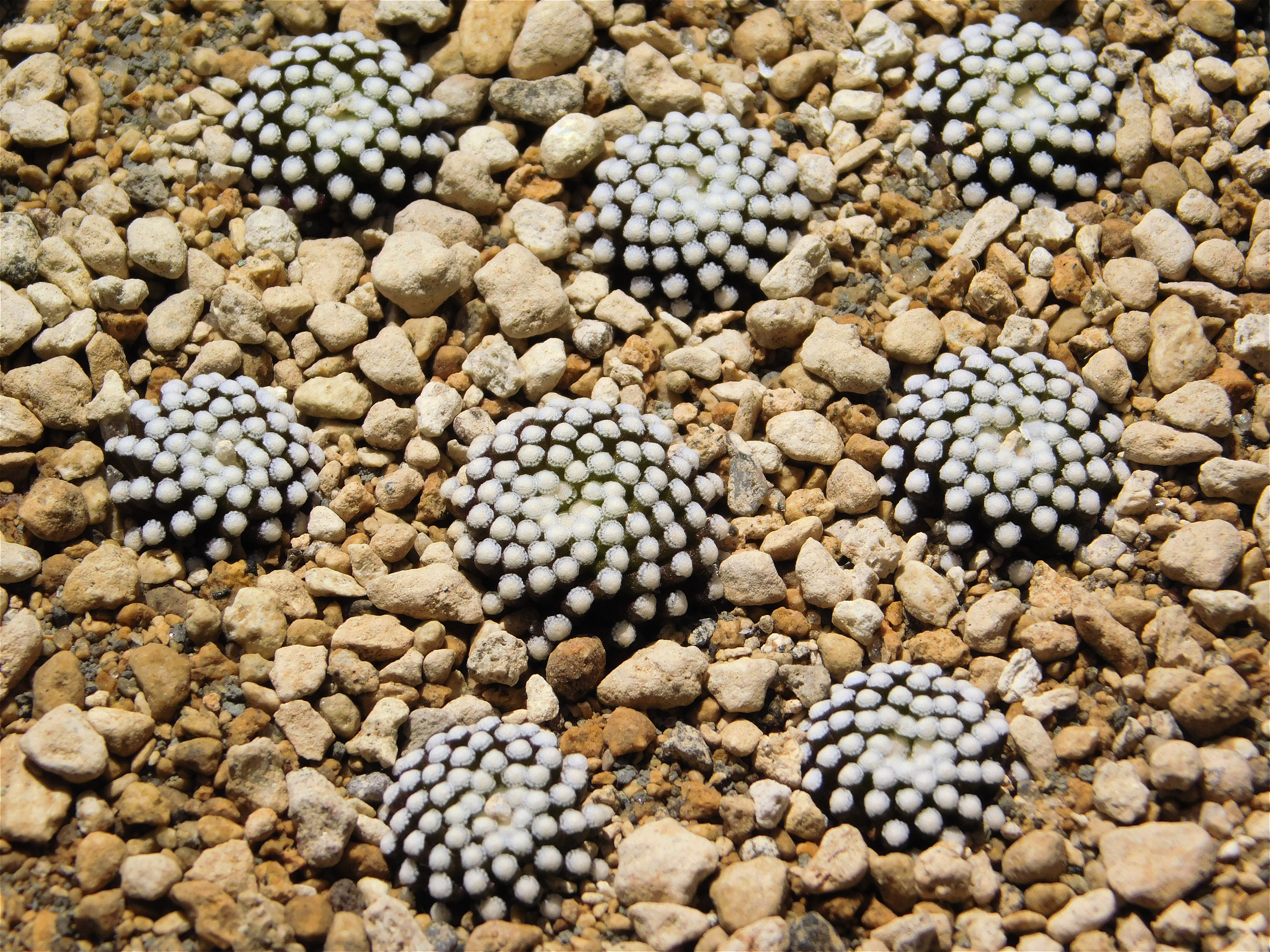
These M. luethyi are being propagated by cuttings in a pure mineral soil.

Eight Mammillaria luethyi plants were collected during the initial type collection in 1996. These plants were propagated at the Cante Botanical Gardens in San Miguel de Allende under the supervision of Charlie Glass. From here the species was distributed to Mexican growers. A harsh winter in 1997/1998 caused significant frost damage to the botanical garden's collections, prompting an urgent need for funding. Around this time, two cactus enthusiasts from the Czech Republic and Slovakia offered a $2,000 donation in exchange for two M. luethyi specimens. The plants arrived in Prague in June 1998. Within a few years, M. luethyi entered European cactus collections, and propagation efforts, including tissue culture, led to hundreds of plants being reproduced. Grafted offsets soon became widely available in Europe, initially at a high cost, but their rapid growth and reproduction made them more accessible. Besides Europe, the species quickly appeared in the United States and Japan. M. luethyi is now mass-produced in South Korea for Dutch nurseries, grafted onto Hylocereus.

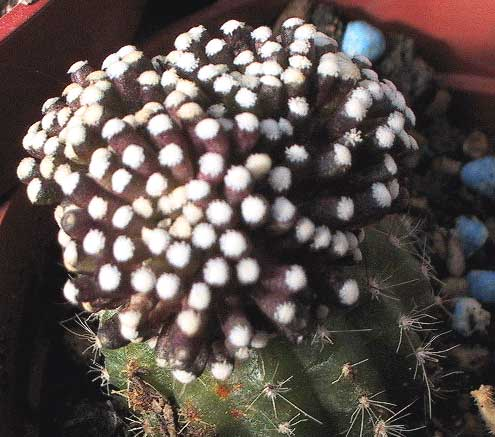
Most M. luethyi found in trade are grafted, like this specimen.

M. luethyi is today widely cultivated as an ornamental plant. It is appreciated for its shape, floriferousness, and the color of its spines and flowers. The plants are usually grafted, but produce showy flowers when grown on their own roots too. Writing for the Cactus and Succulent Journal, Zlatko Janeba estimates that "nowadays, M. luethyi is on a display in almost every cactus collection worldwide, and may be actually one of the most commonly cultivated mammillarias of all". Janeba and Lüthy consider this a successful approach to introducing a new species into cultivation while preserving wild populations and avoiding the trade of wild-collected specimens.

Mammillaria luethyi is easily propagated vegetatively, as grafted plants produce clusters that can be used for rooting or further grafting. However, growing the plant from seeds remains difficult because successful germination depends on the seeds reaching the correct stage of maturity. Two cultivars have proven popular: one is crested, the other bright yellow, called M. luethyi 'Aurea' or Mammillaria luethyi f. aurata. Such vibrant, chlorophyll-deficient forms typically require grafting onto green stocks and do not tolerate direct sunlight.
