= Mrs Crosby's =

Bar in Ciudad Acuña

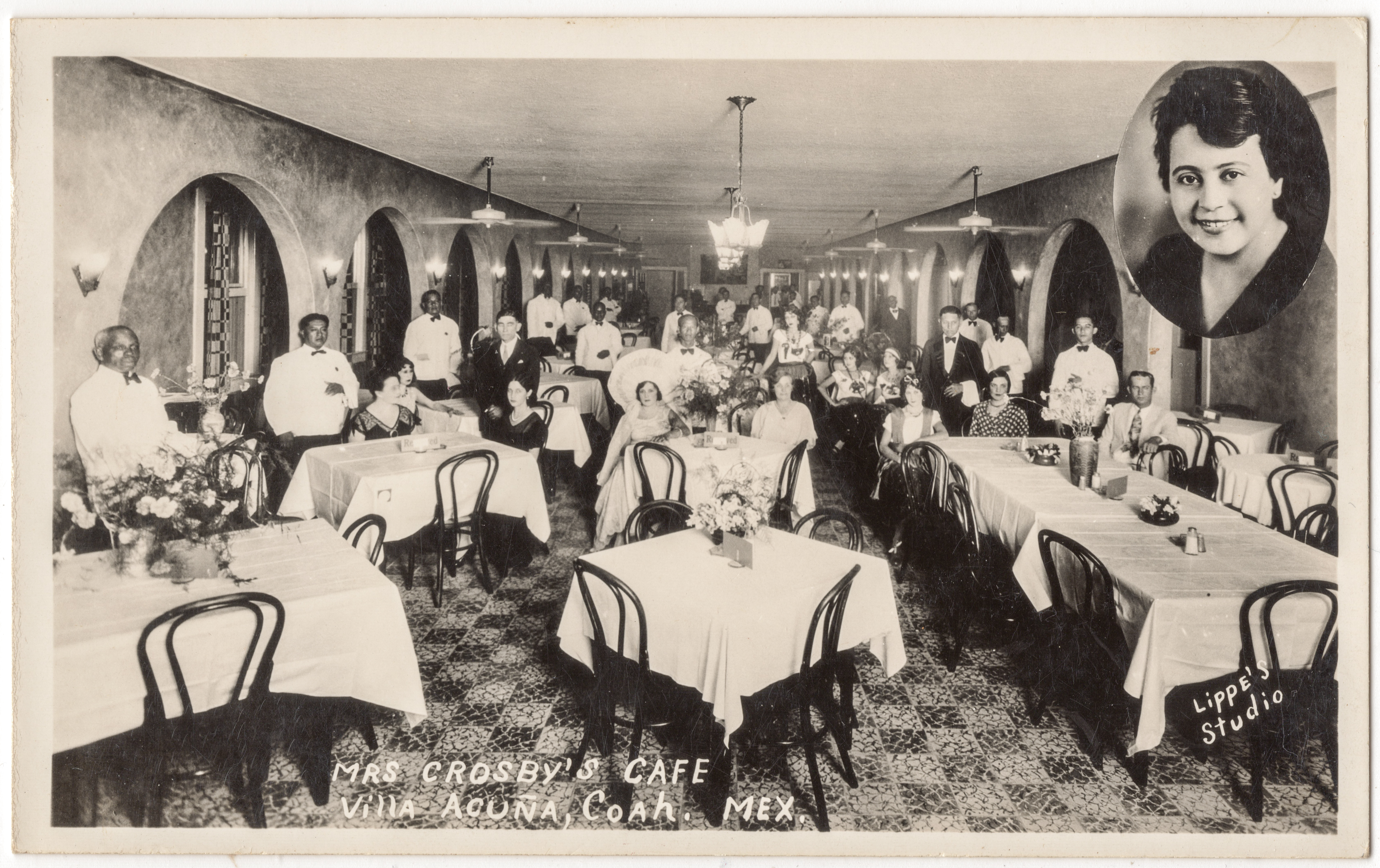
Mrs Crosby's dining room around the 1930s. Mrs Crosby is pictured in the upper right corner.

Crosby's Restaurant and Bar, also known as Mrs Crosby's and Ma Crosby's, is a historic bar in Ciudad Acuña, Coahuila, Mexico, near the Mexico–United States border. It was founded by Esther Crosby in Del Rio, Texas, in 1915 and relocated to Acuña in 1923, becoming one of the most popular eating, drinking, and dancing venues in Acuña. For some time it also included a hotel. It is referenced in scientific literature as the place of discovery of the miniature cactus species Mammillaria luethyi. It is also mentioned in a song by George Strait.

== Establishment ==
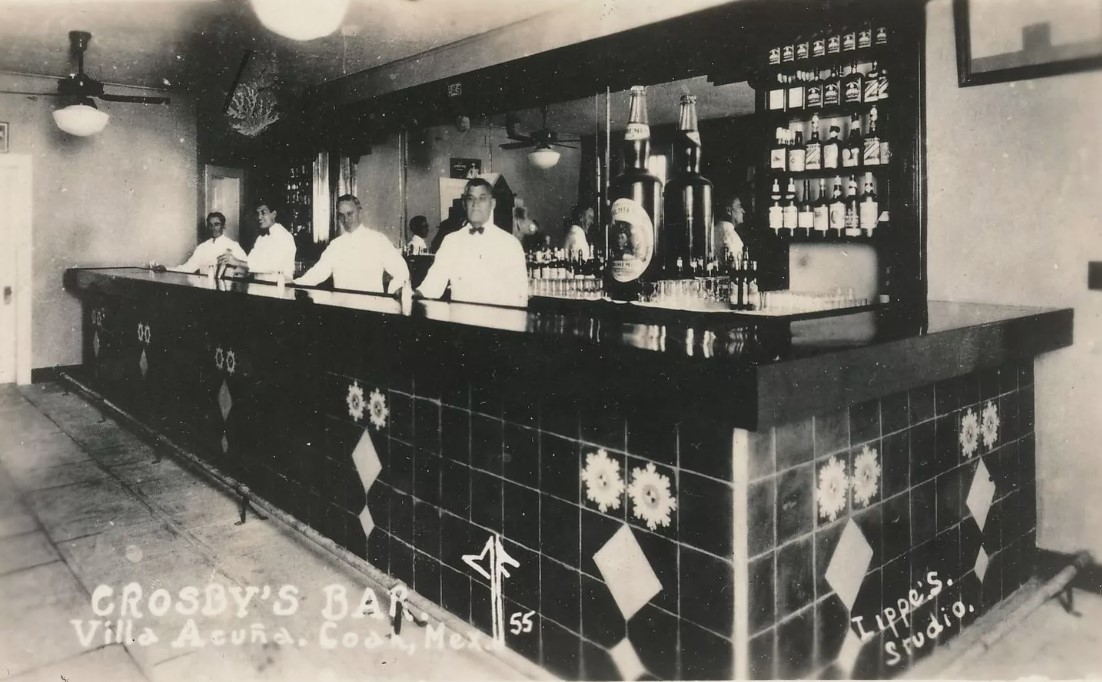
Mrs Crosby's has been famous for its food and drinks.

Esther Otamendi Crosby, known as "Ma Crosby", of Salvatierra, Guanajuato, opened a small café in Del Rio, Texas, in 1915. It was situated on property behind what is now the Woolworth Building. During difficult economic times, Crosby paid a symbolic rent in the form of coffee or breakfast to her landlord, Jewish American merchant Max Stool. The business not only survived but flourished, relocating to Ciudad Acuña, just across the Rio Grande border, in 1923. Crosby personally greeted her patrons, and her establishment became one of the most popular on the border, renowned for its cleanliness, air conditioning, and high-quality Mexican food and beverages.

Crosby's is located on Acuña's historic downtown and tourist strip, Calle Hidalgo, alongside the Toltec Café and other clubs and restaurants, immediately next to the Del Río–Ciudad Acuña International Bridge. It is well-known for its nostalgic ambiance: arched doorways, adobe and wood-paneled walls, wooden furniture (including original barstools), antique brass, floors of wood and original green and white ceramic tile flooring, and black-and-white photographs of Mexican revolutionaries that decorate the interior. Occasionally also decorated with sombreros, the interior design evokes the atmosphere of a Western film set.

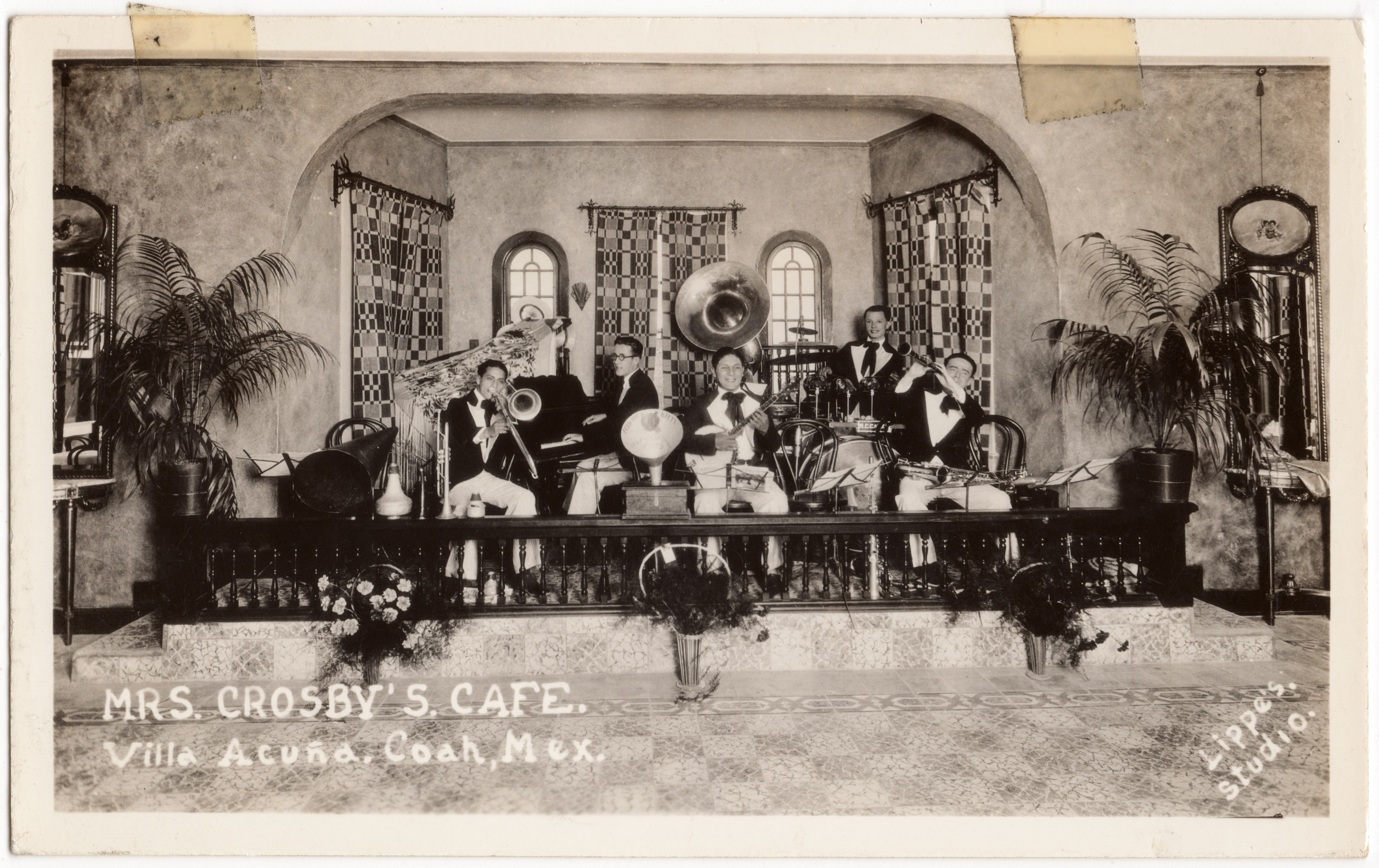
Mrs Crosby was a popular dancing venue thanks to live music, but the dancing hall closed in the 2000s.

At one point, the site also included a hotel and a dance hall. An orchestra played from 6 p.m. to midnight to encourage dancing. The addition of an outdoor patio, a hotel, and a curiosity shop transformed Mrs. Crosby's into a comprehensive destination for travelers while also becoming a favored venue for locals celebrating special occasions.

== Clientele ==
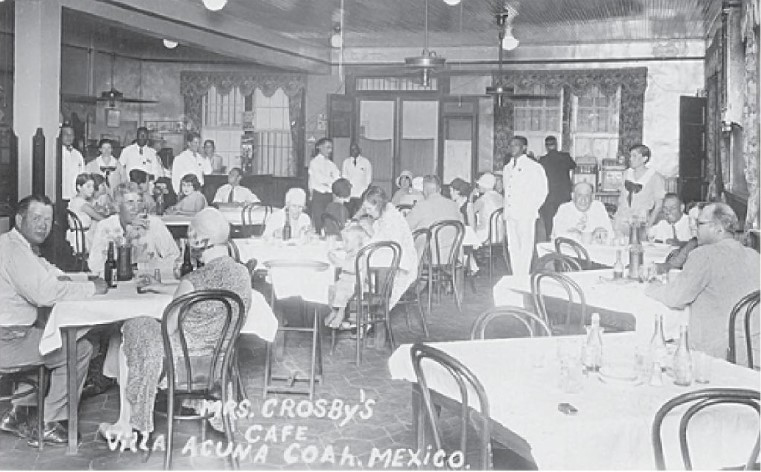
Mrs Crosby's has been favored by US tourists, oilmen, ranchers, military personnel, celebrities, and scientists.

The establishment has traditionally catered to a diverse clientele that includes U.S. tourists, particularly those crossing over from Del Rio, local Mexican workers, U.S. oilmen, ranchers, and U.S. military personnel stationed at a nearby airbase. Scientists frequented the establishment as well; it is at Mrs Crosby's that Norman Boke discovered a hitherto unknown species of cactus growing in a coffee can in 1952. The plants had been given to Mrs Crosby by a local miner and thrived on her windowsill before they were sent to be studied at St. Louis, Missouri, where they promptly died; all that remained for the next 44 years were pictures of Mrs Crosby's specimens, including one photographed in the coffee can.

Over time, Crosby's became a cultural landmark and a border icon, attracting celebrities as well. It is mentioned in the lyrics of George Strait's 1981 song "Blame it on Mexico". In the song, Strait humorously narrates a series of events during a visit to Mexico, mentioning an evening of excessive guitar music, tequila, salt, and lime, which ultimately led to a disrupted romantic encounter and a reflective aftermath.

== Decline ==
As of 2010, the bar was co-owned by Gabriel Ramos. Business at Crosby's had been negatively impacted by several factors, including decreased tourism attributed to fears of violence associated with Mexico's drug cartel war, stricter U.S. passport requirements, and reports of border violence in the media. Its dance hall had been closed for a year and a half as of 2010 due to a decline in patrons.
