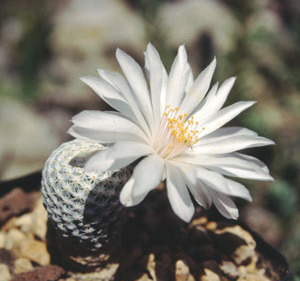

Conservation status
- Critically Endangered (IUCN 3.1)

Scientific classification
- Kingdom: Plantae
- Clade: Tracheophytes
- Clade: Angiosperms
- Clade: Eudicots
- Order: Caryophyllales
- Family: Cactaceae
- Subfamily: Cactoideae
- Genus: Mammillaria
- Species: M. albiflora

Binomial name
- Mammillaria albiflora (Werderm.) Backeb.

Synonyms
- Escobariopsis albiflora (Werderm.) Doweld 2000; Mammillaria herrerae var. albiflora Werderm. 1931; Neomammillaria herrerae var. albiflora (Werderm.) Y.Itô 1981

= Mammillaria albiflora =

Species of cactus

Mammillaria albiflora is a critically endangered species of cactus.

== Description ==
Mammillaria albiflora typically grows alone and rarely forms clusters. Its somewhat cylindrical stems are hidden beneath dense spines and can reach heights of over 5 centimeters, with diameters between 1 and 2 centimeters. The small tubercles do not contain milky sap, and the plant's axils are bare. It lacks a central spine. Instead, it has 60 to 80 short, white radial spines that are intertwined. The flowers are white with a slight pinkish hue. They can be up to 3.5 centimeters long and have a diameter of about 2.5 centimeters. The fruit hides beneath the spines but remains external to the plant body. The seeds are black and require careful handling to locate.

== Distribution ==
Mammillaria albiflora is native to the Mexican state of Guanajuato, found south of Pozos at elevations between 2,160 and 2,200 metres (7,090 and 7,220 ft), including along the road to San José Iturbide and at La Calera—locations roughly 50 km or more from the range of M. herrerae. It grows on sloping calcareous rock in semi-desert. Because it occurs in only one location with a limited range and its population is continuously declining, it is listed as Critically Endangered by the International Union for Conservation of Nature (IUCN). The chief threat to its survival is illegal plant collecting by both amateurs and commercial collectors. A part of the location was fenced off in an attempt to protect it, but the fence was soon breached. The population fell from about 10,000 to about 5,000 individuals from 1993 to 2013.

Mammillaria albiflora is illegally collected or commercially cultivated to be grown as an ornamental plant. It is propagated worldwide and may be found in international trade. It is challenging to cultivate, apparently resenting peat and acidic humus in potting mix. A mixture containing some limestone is likely beneficial. Successful growth also requires maximum sun exposure, which is crucial for flowering.

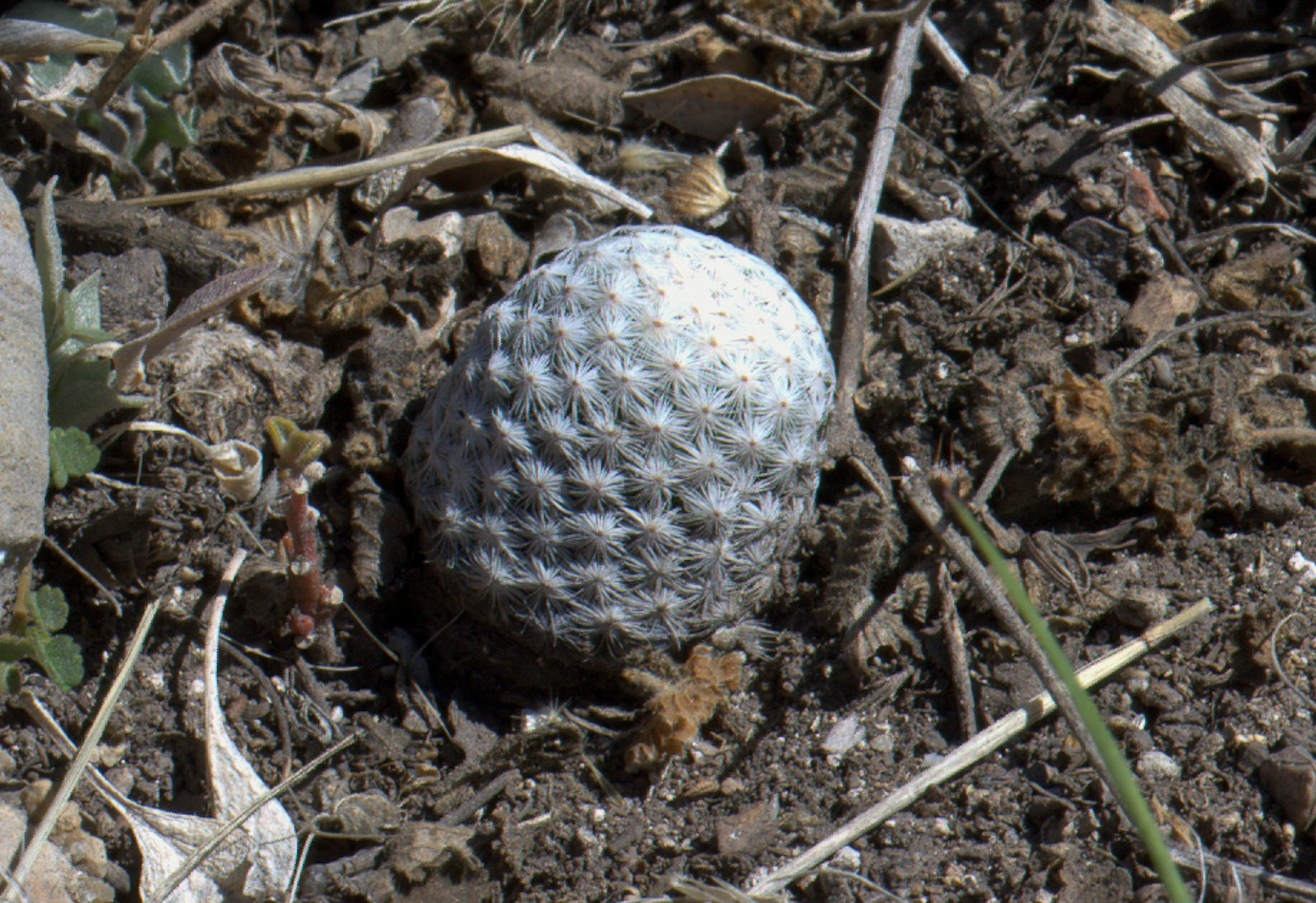
Plant growing in habitat

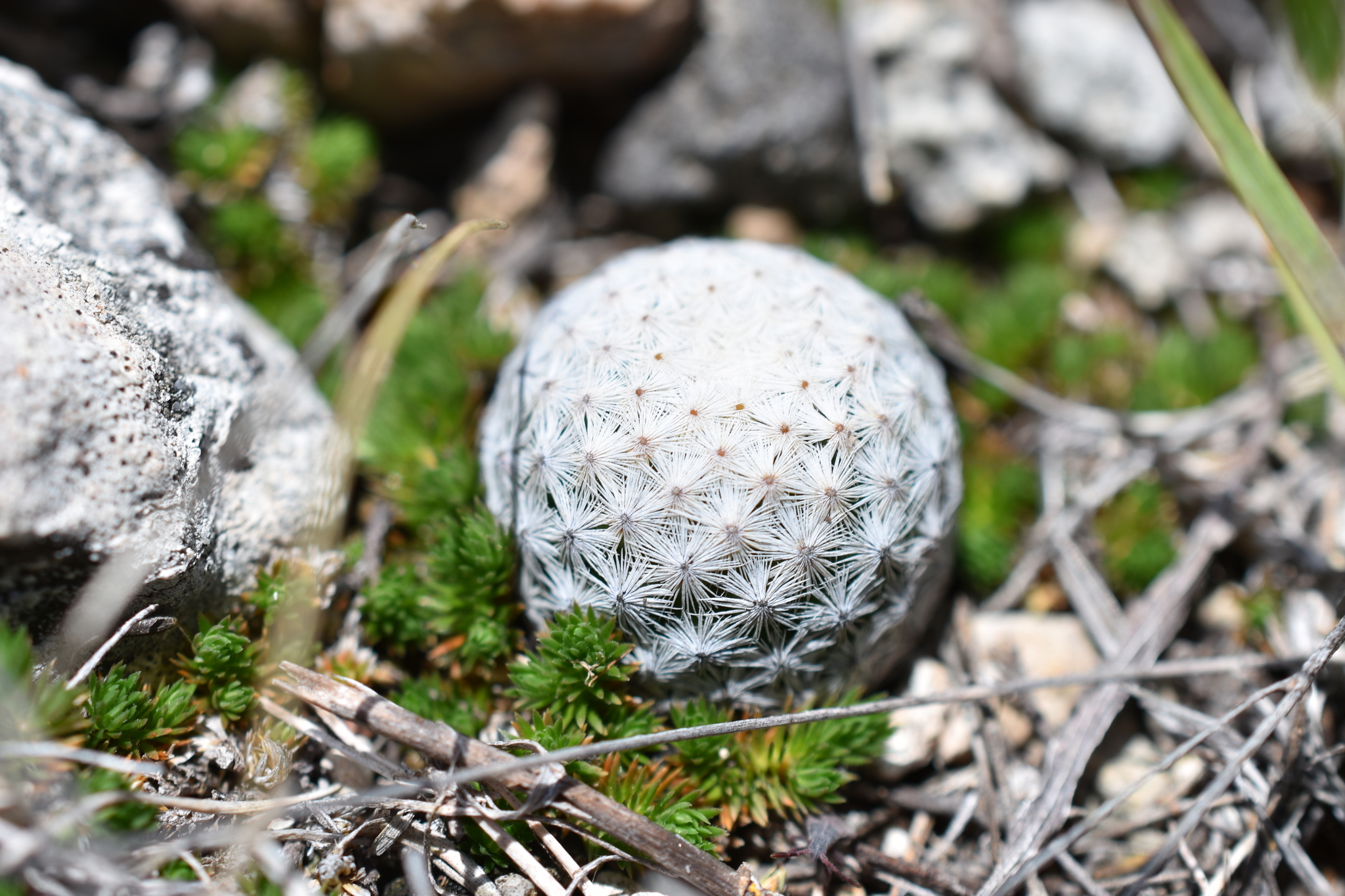
Plant growing in habitat

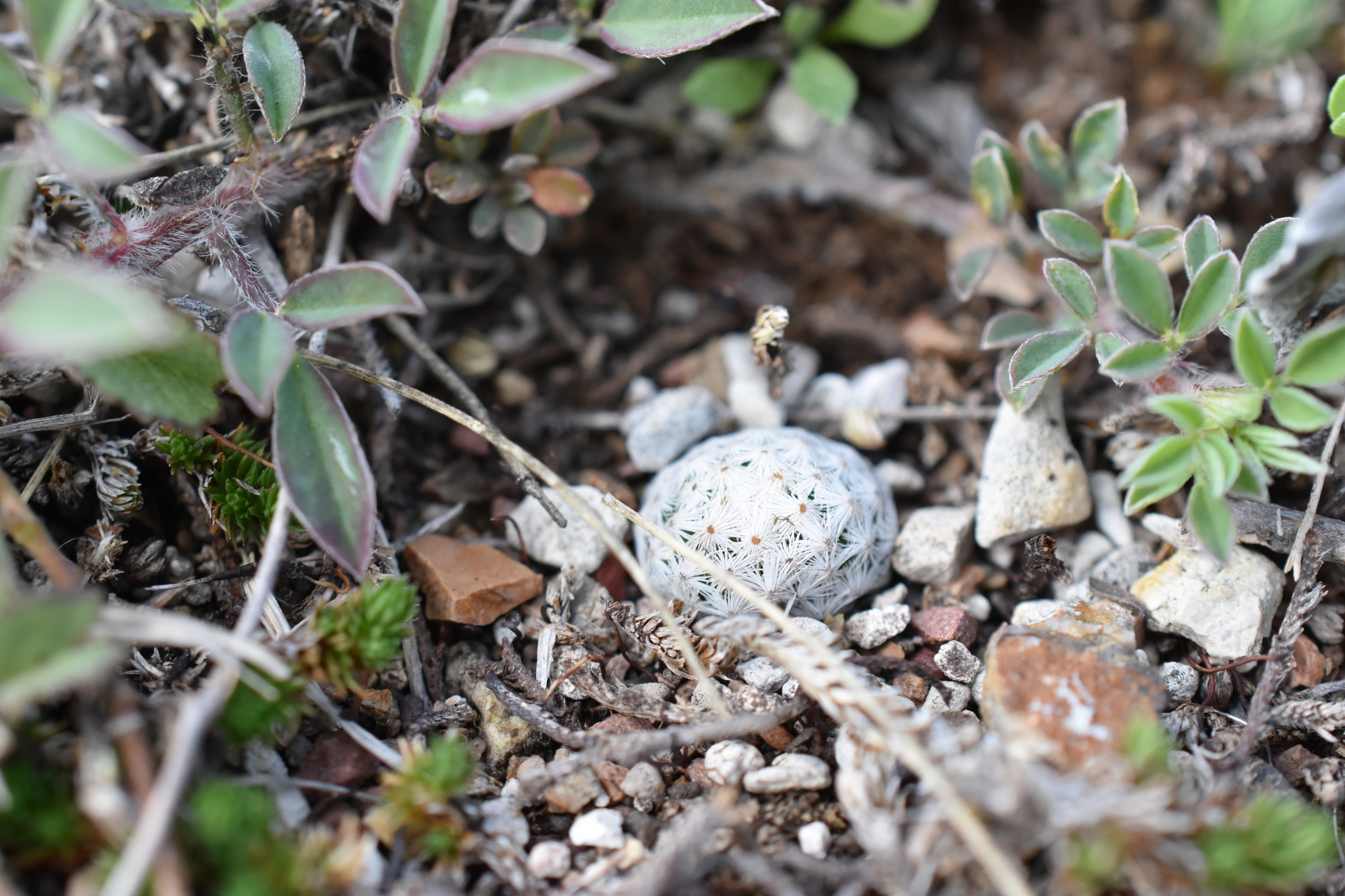
Plant growing in habitat

== Taxonomy ==
It was first described in 1931 by Erich Werdermann as Mammillaria herrerae var. albiflora. The name "albiflora" comes from Latin, meaning "white-flowered" ("albus" = white, "florus" = flowered). The botanist David Hunt initially considered it "probably just a phase" of Mammillaria herrerae. Other students of the Mammillaria genus disagreed, including Charlie Glass, and Hunt eventually accepted it as a distinct species. M. albiflora is more slender than M. herrerae, with typically solitary stems about 2 cm wide and at least 5 cm tall. It has fewer radial spines (60–80, compared to 100+ in M. herrerae) but larger flowers, up to 3.5 cm long, white with a faint pinkish hue under good light. Curt Backeberg elevated it to full species status in 1937.
