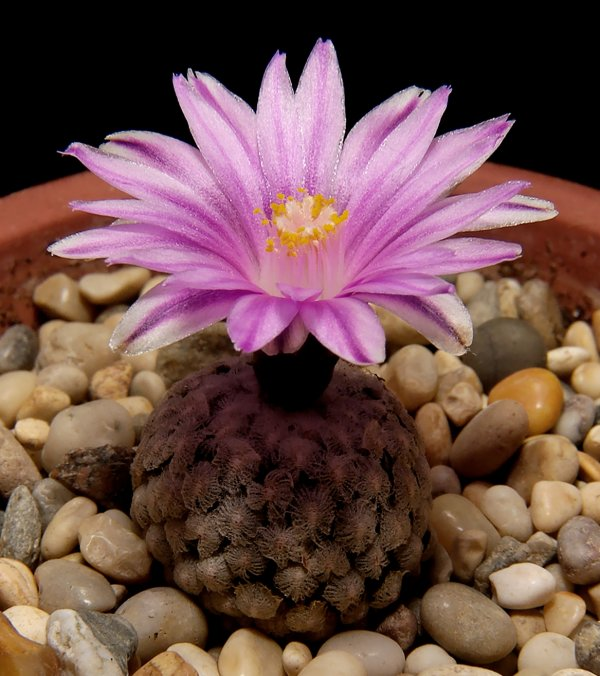

Conservation status
- Vulnerable (IUCN 3.1)
- CITES Appendix I

Scientific classification
- Kingdom: Plantae
- Clade: Tracheophytes
- Clade: Angiosperms
- Clade: Eudicots
- Order: Caryophyllales
- Family: Cactaceae
- Subfamily: Cactoideae
- Genus: Turbinicarpus
- Species: T. valdezianus

Binomial name
- Turbinicarpus valdezianus (H.Moeller) Glass & R.C.Foster

Synonyms
- Echinocactus valdezianus (H.Moeller) Boed. 1930; Gymnocactus valdezianus (H.Moeller) Backeb. 1966; Mammillaria valdeziana (H.Moeller) H.P.Kelsey & Dayton 1942; Neolloydia valdeziana (H.Moeller) E.F.Anderson 1986; Normanbokea valdeziana (H.Moeller) Kladiwa & Buxb. 1969; Pediocactus valdezianus (H.Moeller) Halda 1998; Pelecyphora valdeziana H.Moeller 1930; Pseudosolisia valdeziana (H.Moeller) Y.Itô 1981; Thelocactus valdezianus (H.Moeller) Borg 1937; Gymnocactus valdezianus var. albiflorus (Pazout) Backeb. 1966; Pelecyphora plumosa Boed. & Ritter in Monatsschr. Deutsch. 1930; Pelecyphora valdeziana var. albiflora Pazout 1960; Pseudosolisia valdeziana var. albiflora Y.Itô 1981; Turbinicarpus valdezianus var. albiflorus (Pazout) Zachar, Staník, Lux & Dráb 1996; Turbinicarpus valdezianus var. pazoutii Halda & Malina 2005

= Turbinicarpus valdezianus =

Species of cactus

Turbinicarpus valdezianus is a plant species in the Cactaceae family.

== Description ==
Turbinicarpus valdezianus, one of the smallest and slowest-growing plants in its genus, has tiny feathery spines that obscure its body. While it is usually found growing solitary, it can occasionally form clumps. When young, this plant has spherical stems that later become cylindrical with a narrower base and short, spirally arranged tubercles. The plumose spination entirely covers the apex. About half of the plant is underground, supported by a substantial taproot. These plants typically reach 3–5 cm in height and 1–2 cm in diameter. They are adorned with 25-30 dense, feathery, white spines, each measuring around 0.5 mm long and spreading flat around the areoles.

In the spring, Turbinicarpus valdezianus produces 1-5 flowers that open during the day at the plant's apex. It is found scattered in small populations across various locations. The color of its flowers varies from pinkish-white to bright pink, with darker magenta or reddish-brown midveins.

== Distribution ==
This species thrives in the Chihuahuan Desert and Meseta Central matorral of Mexico, ranging from Saltillo in the state of Coahuila to nearly Matehuala in San Luis Potosí, at 1400 to 1600 meters elevation. It is threatened by habitat loss.
