= Norman H. Boke =

Norman Hill Boke
- Born: March 14, 1913; United States
- Died: February 8, 1996 (aged 82)
- Other name: Norman H. Boke

Norman Hill Boke (1913–1996) was a plant anatomist who specialized in the anatomy of the Cactaceae. He spent the greater part of his career at the University of Oklahoma in Norman, Oklahoma.

== Life ==
He received his undergraduate degree from the University of South Dakota in 1934 and his master's degree from the University of Oklahoma in 1936. He earned the Ph.D. degree at the University of California, Berkeley in 1939, under the supervision of Adriance S. Foster.

After leaving Berkeley, he taught at the University of New Mexico and Johns Hopkins University. In 1945, he returned to the University of Oklahoma, where he was made George Lynn Cross Research Professor in 1965, and where he remained until his retirement. He taught plant anatomy and vascular plant morphology, as well as a course in optical methods of biology.

He is best known for his interpretation of the gynoecium of the Cactaceae. He studied the family extensively in Mexico; and was held in high regard by other students of the family. The genus Normanbokea (now included in Turbinicarpus) and the species Epithelantha bokei were named after him.

He was Editor-in-Chief of the American Journal of Botany from 1970 through 1975. He was a member of Phi Beta Kappa, Alpha Tau Omega fraternity, and recipient of a Guggenheim Memorial Fellowship.
