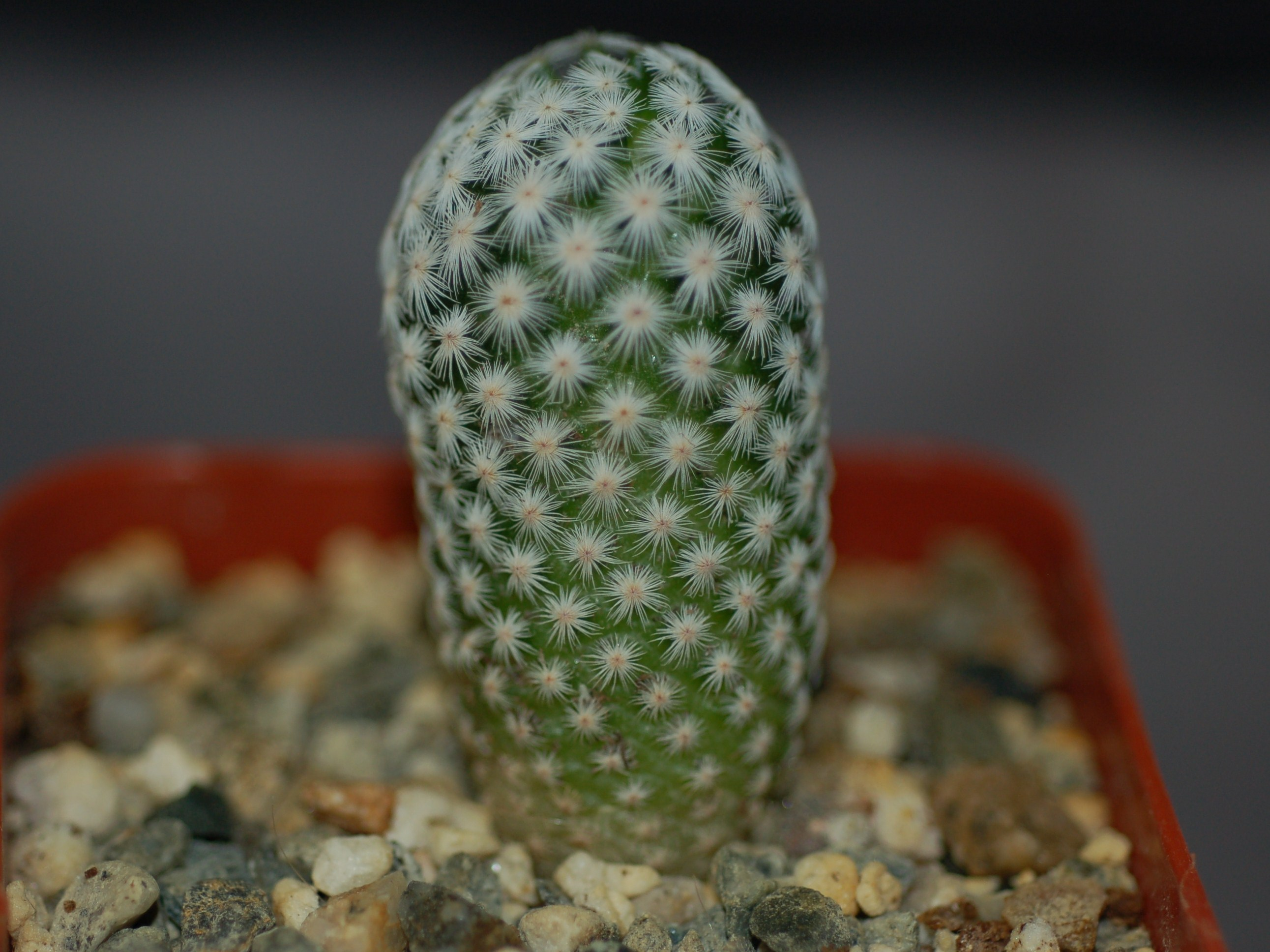

Conservation status
- Critically Endangered (IUCN 3.1)

Scientific classification
- Kingdom: Plantae
- Clade: Tracheophytes
- Clade: Angiosperms
- Clade: Eudicots
- Order: Caryophyllales
- Family: Cactaceae
- Subfamily: Cactoideae
- Genus: Mammillaria
- Species: M. herrerae

Binomial name
- Mammillaria herrerae Werderm.

= Mammillaria herrerae =

Species of cactus

Mammillaria herrerae is a species of plant in the family Cactaceae. It is endemic to Mexico where it is confined to Querétaro. It thrives in a semi-desert shrubland habitat. Common name is golf ball cactus. It is threatened by habitat loss and illegal collection. In a 20-year period over 95% of the species population was illegally collected or sold. Mammillaria herrerae has an IUCN rating of critically endangered. Due to its specific growing conditions, there is a challenge in propagating. Many studies are being done to determine best growing conditions, through related species.

== Growing conditions/propagating ==
Mammillaria herrerae thrives in terrestrial, shrubland, rocky, desert areas. Specific conditions for growing and propagating include:

- Open mineral potting soil
- Perfect drainage
- Repotting every 2–3 years
- Full exposure to sun
- Ventilation
- Water and frost sensitive
- No watering during the winter season,
- Scarcely watering during growing season
- Fertilizer needs to be high in potassium and phosphorus but low in nitrogen

== Causes of threatened status ==
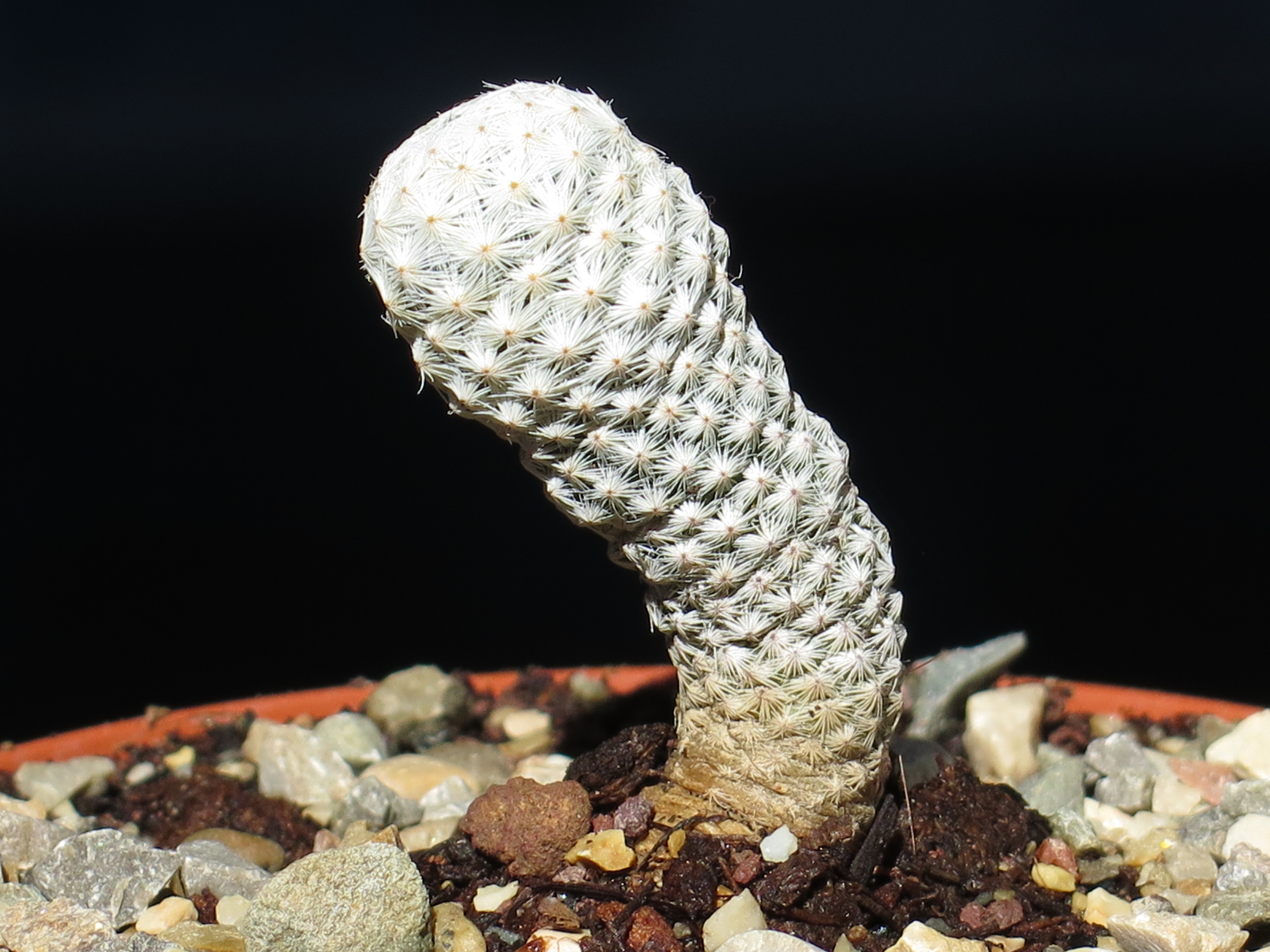
Mammillaria herreae v. albiflora, from San Luis de la Paz, Guanajuato.

Limited environmental conditions: M. herrerae does not always get the care and attention needed due to its very specific growing conditions.

Illegal collection: As M. herrerae becomes an endangered and scares species, it becomes more valuable and incites collection for trade. Oftentimes traders sell these endangered species for a high value and load up truck loads of them to get the most economic gain.

Habitat destruction: has been one major cause to loss of biodiversity. The land where these species grow gets destroyed and used for agriculture, grazing purposes, and residential development.

== Conservation measures ==
There have been many ongoing experiments, researching the best growing conditions for M. herrerae in order to work towards conservation and cultivation. One study was mentioned in the South African Journal of Botany. Many studies have been done through the Convention on International Trade in Endangered Species of Wild Fauna and Flora (CITES).

== Related species ==
A few species closely related to M. herrerae include: Mammillaria humboldtii, Mammillaria candida, and M. moelleriana due to their physiology. They are grouped in a clade series called Lasiacanthae.
