= John Gambling =

John Gambling may refer to three generations of American radio-show hosts in New York City:

- John B. Gambling (1897–1974)
- John A. Gambling (1930–2004)
- John R. Gambling (born 1950)
