= Bob Grant (radio host) =

American radio host (1929–2013)

- Born: Robert Ciro Gigante; March 14, 1929; Chicago, Illinois, U.S.
- Died: December 31, 2013 (aged 84); Hillsborough Township, New Jersey, U.S.
- Occupation: Radio personality
- Years active: 1940s–2013

Robert Ciro Gigante (March 14, 1929 – December 31, 2013), known as Bob Grant, was an American radio host. A veteran of broadcasting in New York City, Grant is considered a pioneer of the conservative talk radio format and was one of the early adopters of the "combat talk" format. Grant's career spanned from the 1950s until shortly before his death at age 84 on December 31, 2013.

Grant was widely termed a political conservative, and personally considered himself to be a conservative with some libertarian leanings.

== Career ==
=== Early work ===
As a high school student at Steinmetz High School in Chicago, Grant auditioned for the Central Radio Workshop of the Chicago Public Schools, where once every two weeks he would perform in plays on FM radio station WBEZ. After high school, Grant attended the University of Illinois at Urbana–Champaign and studied journalism, where he also auditioned and got accepted for the school's radio station. As a student, Grant acted in plays, such as "the Duchess of Malfi". Grant left school early to take a job in radio. Grant originally got into professional radio when he answered a phone call for his roommate, and the program director calling thought he had a good voice. On May 14, 1948, Grant did his first professional news announcement, to discuss the formation of Israel. He then got a job at the news department at WBBM (AM) in Chicago and also continued acting in plays. Grant may have done other work as an extra, but he did not discuss his acting work much on his radio show. Grant also worked on a radio show called "Gold Coast" in the late 1950s, which had comedy skits. While at WBBM, he was forced to change his last name from "Gigante" to "Grant" in order to sound less ethnic. During the Korean War, he served in the Naval Reserve.

Grant then moved from Chicago to Los Angeles. Grant's first radio work in Los Angeles was on radio station KNX (AM) in 1959, where he worked with future actor Paul Condylis on the Condylis & Grant Comedy Show. The Los Angeles Times stated, "Their names are Paul Condylis and Bob Grant, voted by this corner as the outstanding newcomers of 1959. Prime Examples Condylis and Grant, a couple of dialecticians from Chicago, specialize in a form of comedy that is most popular today satire." Grant described the show as being similar to "Saturday Night Live" on the radio. Condylis and Grant would also entertain at places, such as college campuses. Afterwards Grant later became sports director at KABC (AM) in Los Angeles. Grant was then urged by co-worker and early controversial radio host Joe Pyne to substitute for him. Shortly after, John F. Kennedy was assassinated, and Pyne being a critic of Kennedy's was not allowed to host his show, and Grant substituted for him, eventually inheriting the show in 1964. Grant hosted three shows on KABC (AM) in 1964 titled, "Open Line," "Night Line," and "Sunday Line." While at KABC Grant would interview celebrities including Muhammad Ali, controversial figures such as Kwanzaa founder Ron "Maulana" Karenga, and politicians including Ronald Reagan in what Grant claimed was Reagan's first interview as a political candidate in 1965. While Grant would become a controversial radio figure, he started off more mellow. He competed during nighttime radio against his former co-worker and mentor Joe Pyne and radio commentator Michael Jackson. An October 25, 1964 Los Angeles Times article describes Grant's broadcasting style:

Bob Grant is a relative newcomer, but his background is solidly radio, having been a comedian, newscaster and sports announcer. He is the calmest and more inquisitive. Grant's audience appears to be older and he deals less in controversy than Pyne or Jackson. Grant, however, is versatile and discusses subjects intelligently. He is much less a showman than his counterparts.

Grant moved from KABC (AM) to KLAC in March 1967. Some of Grant's colleagues at the station were Joel A. Spivak, Les Crane, and mentor Joe Pyne. Grant was described as Los Angeles' most controversial nighttime radio host. In 1969, KLAC switched from a talk station to a music station. Grant was then asked to co-host a television show called "Tempo" with actress Jeanne Baird that aired on KHJ Channel 9 in Los Angeles from 11 a.m. to 2 p.m. After some controversies, including offending guest Marlo Thomas, Grant was eventually let go and replaced by Regis Philbin in July 1970.

=== Move to New York City (WMCA: 1970–1977) ===
Grant was approached to come to New York by executives at WMCA when WMCA was going to become a talk station. He was recommended to them by Jack Thayer, who had been the station manager of KLAC. Grant was opposed to the move, as he hated what he knew about New York, i.e., the subways, crime, and congestion. He also had four children and a home in Los Angeles. Grant was convinced to come to New York when an executive said to him at the end of a meeting, "It's just too bad that the number-one talk-show host in America doesn't want to come to the number-one market in America." Grant came to New York and presented his first show on WMCA on September 21, 1970, where he worked for station manager R. Peter Strauss. After being in New York for a short time, Grant wanted to go back to Los Angeles. He was contacted by the former news director at KLAC, who was now a program director at another station to join his station, but Grant declined, because he had signed a two-year contract with WMCA. Grant's unhappiness being in New York led to him becoming angry with the callers. He hoped to get fired by R. Peter Strauss, however his ratings soared as he got angrier. Grant was quoted on May 23, 1971, about his new radio show in New York:

L.A. radio is really hip compared to New York. Here the scene is very provincial and ethnic and liberal. Being a conservative, I am referred to by most of my callers as the house right-winger or fascist. Actually, it gets pretty funny, because they do more yelling at me than engaging in useful debate. The audience in Los Angeles was much more sophisticated." [...] "Since WMCA started Dialog Radio, it's really shot up in the ratings, we've gone from around 12th to third in the market.

Grant was distinctively out of fashion with both the times and with some countercultural WMCA personalities, including Alex Bennett. His offbeat, but combative style (along with Fairness Doctrine requirements of the era) won him seven years on WMCA, with a growing and loyal audience. Grant became well known for his abrasive manner with callers and his popular catch phrase, "get off my phone." His sign-off for many years was "Get Gaddafi", which meant remove Muammar Gaddafi. In 1970, Grant quickly became a controversial opinion maker. Grant began saying, "we're slipping and sliding into third worldism", along with opposing the Immigration and Nationality Act of 1965. Grant also came up with a solution to the high birthrate in the 1970s among poor women, which he called Bob Grant's Mandatory Sterilization Program or Act. This led to racism charges, but Grant denied that the program was only for minorities.

On March 8, 1973, Grant had scheduled New York Rep. Benjamin S. Rosenthal, who was leading a boycott of meat. Grant later learned that Rosenthal would not appear on his show, and in a discussion with a caller, Grant referred to Rosenthal as a "coward". Rosenthal then filed a complaint with the Federal Communications Commission, and the issue went all the way up to the United States Court of Appeals for the District of Columbia Circuit in Straus Communications v. Federal Communications Commission, United States Court of Appeals for the District of Columbia Circuit, January 16, 1976, Wright, J. The appeals court ultimately ruled in favor of WMCA and Grant, due to the fact that Grant offered the congressman an invitation to appear on his show, granting Rosenthal equal time.

Grant did an early shock jock stunt while at WMCA. A female listener had called in and was curious about pornographic films. Grant decided to take women who listened to him on a trip to a Times Square porno theater to view a porn film. About 100 women showed up for the trip, followed by a roundtable discussion on Grant's show. Grant would have two more listener trips to see a porn film after this.

One of Grant's most memorable regular callers was Ms. Trivia, who aired her "Beef of the Week", a series of seemingly trivial complaints. Ms. Trivia was Grant's guest at a Halloween Festival dinner held at Lauritano's Restaurant in The Bronx, where a young Ms. Trivia, not long out of her teens, revealed herself for the first time to a startled radio audience, many who had expected and assumed, based upon her articulation and intonation, that she would be an elderly, prudish woman. Instead, a statuesque and fashionable Ms. Trivia, wearing an elaborate Victorian costume, was the surprise guest seated next to Grant at the dais table along with several political figures from New York. The following day the majority of calls to the show were for the purpose of obtaining information about the mysterious Mm. Trivia, with Grant in his typical manner finally in exasperation hanging up on the callers, shouting, "THIS IS NOT Mm. TRIVIA'S SHOW!"

Grant popularized the -gry puzzle, a word game, on his WMCA show in 1975, stating some version of the question "There are three words in the English language that end in -gry. Two of them are angry and hungry. What is the third?". This has no conclusive answer, and spread following Grant's broadcast.

While at WMCA, Grant attracted attention from a 1974 commentary he recorded, titled "How Long Will You Stand Aside". Grant also released an LP record in 1977 titled, "Let's Be Heard", which was a recording of a speech Grant gave before a synagog in New York. Grant left WMCA in 1977.

=== WOR and WWDB ===
Grant began on WOR on Memorial Day, May 30, 1977, where he broadcast nights 11:30 p.m.–2:30 a.m. Grant took over the time-slot from host Barry Farber who hosted his show on it for 16 years, but had to give it up, because he was running for Mayor of New York City. According to producer Maurice Tunick, Grant had 24.3 share of the ratings at one point, meaning one in four people listening to the radio were listening to Grant's show.

In 1979, Grant had gotten into trouble for some comments he had made and was fired from WOR. Grant was assisted by colleague Barry Farber who fought with WMCA station manager Ellen Straus to rehire Grant. Farber broadcast during the 4–7 p.m. weekday time slot on WMCA. When asked by Straus at a meeting if Farber was willing to give up his airtime for Grant, Farber replied, "Yes he can have my time. I'd rather he have my time than no time at all." Grant describes the remarks that got him fired from WOR in a 2011 column:

I had done my nightly show on WOR and a caller phoned in to the show saying he was upset with a woman who was blaming the police for what happened to her sons. I had read the story the man was referring to and noted that the woman, who was very angry with the police, was the public relations director or community relations director of WCBS newsradio. I stupidly asked the caller if he knew how she got that job. The caller said he didn't know and I promptly and arrogantly said, "I will tell you how. She passed the gynecological and pigmentation test—that's how!" Not only did that turn off Roger Ailes, but WOR was forced to fire me even though I had given the radio giant the biggest overnight ratings they ever had.

After being fired from WOR, Grant worked at WWDB 96.5 FM in Philadelphia for a year. Grant stated in his book, Let's be Heard, "They actually ran me out of town. After a few months and no offers, I reluctantly agreed to take a job on a talk station in Philadelphia."

Grant returned to WMCA in June 1979 for a Saturday show from 10 a.m. to 2 p.m. while still working in Philadelphia during the week. In April 1980, Grant returned to WMCA full-time, where he was teamed with another radio host named Janet Rose. Mark Simone also worked for Grant as an intern during this time.

=== WABC (1984–1996) ===
In November 1984, WABC (AM) in New York City hired Grant to join their new talk station. He first hosted a show from 9–11 p.m., before moving to the 3–6 p.m. afternoon time slot. The Bob Grant Show consistently dominated the ratings in the highly competitive afternoon drive time slot in New York City and at one point the radio station aired recorded promos announcing him as "America's most listened to talk radio personality." The gravel-voiced Grant reminded listeners during the daily introduction that the "program was unscripted and unrehearsed". On September 15, 1991, a roast honoring Grant for twenty one years of radio in New York City was held in West Orange, New Jersey. Freddie Roman was the Master of Ceremonies, and Grant was roasted by New York Senator Al D'Amato, comedian Pat Cooper, Soupy Sales, Rush Limbaugh, comedian Joe Piscopo and Lynn Samuels, among others.

Grant introduced President George H. W. Bush to a crowd at Vets Field in Ridgewood, New Jersey while he campaigned for reelection on October 22, 1992.

One of the most popular eras of the Bob Grant Show was during the 1993 and 1994 New Jersey and New York elections. Grant helped Rudy Giuliani win in 1993 against David Dinkins, and was also campaigning for Christine Todd Whitman by doing daily rants against New Jersey Governor James Florio calling him "flim-flam Florio." Florio stated at the time, "how can I win with Bob Grant beating my brains out every day?" Grant's afternoon show grew more popular and reached a 7.1 in the ratings. During this time New York Magazine had requested to profile Grant and ask him about controversial remarks he had made. Grant was also asked to be photographed with a WABC banner draped over him and his finger pointing in the air. However, when the issue was released it showed Grant on the cover with the WABC banner covering him resembling a klansman with the words "Why he hates blacks" written across the page." WABC program director John Mainelli would later reveal that he believed Mario Cuomo and Frank Lautenberg were behind this as Cuomo once had cornered Mainelli threatening to reveal dark secrets about Grant to ABC Chairman Thomas Murphy. Lautenberg attacked his Republican opponent Chuck Haytaian on his association with Grant in the campaign. Lautenberg caused Amtrak to stop advertising on Grant's radio show. Christy Whitman, who Grant had helped become governor stated that she would no longer appear on Grant's show. For the 1994 Election, Grant did daily rants against New Jersey Senator Frank Lautenberg calling him "Lousenberg", and New York Governor Mario Cuomo, who he was now calling "the sfaccim." Grant had been friends with Cuomo beginning in the seventies, but they had a falling out during an appearance in 1986 on Grant's show. Grant questioned Cuomo on why he needed a large war chest against an opponent who didn't have much money, and Cuomo hung up on Grant. In 1994, the "Mario Salute" became a staple of Grant's show. Listeners would call in and state, "Mario, assenza me! Tu sei un proprio sfaccim." Grant explained the translation in English was, "Mario, listen to me. You're a real lowlife." T-shirts and bumper stickers were created with anti-Cuomo messages. A listener also made an anti-Mario Cuomo song which Grant would frequently play. Grant campaigned for Cuomo's opponent, George Pataki and had him on as a guest many times allegedly leading to Pataki picking up enough votes to defeat Cuomo.

Grant's long stay at WABC ended when he was fired for a remark about the April 3, 1996, airplane crash involving Commerce Secretary Ron Brown. Grant remarked to caller named, Carl of Oyster Bay (Carl Limbacher, later of NewsMax fame), "My hunch is that [Brown] is the one survivor. I just have that hunch. Maybe it's because, at heart, I'm a pessimist." When Brown was found dead, Grant's comments were widely criticized, and several weeks later, after a media campaign, his contract was terminated. Grant's last show on WABC was on April 16, 1996, where he broadcast from the Reo Diner. He was fired the next day on April 17 by program director Phil Boyce after Grant had held an autograph-signing session for his book "Let's be Heard". Politicians who Grant had assisted, such as Christine Todd Whitman, Rudy Giuliani would never appear on Grant's radio show again, and George Pataki appeared one more time on Grant's last WOR show in January 2006.

=== Return to WOR (1996–2006) ===
After being fired, Grant moved down the dial to WOR to host his show in the same afternoon drive-time slot on April 29, 1996. Grant's age began to show while broadcasting at WOR. He was less engaging with the callers, and not as energetic during his broadcasts. For a time, The Bob Grant Show went into national syndication, but returned to being a local show in 2001. Grant and his WABC replacement Sean Hannity would sometimes throw jabs at each other. Hannity defeated Grant in the ratings from 2001 to 2006.

Grant's WOR run ended on January 13, 2006. Grant's ratings were not to blame for his departure, according to the New York Post, which mentioned that the decision was reached because the station's other shows had niche audiences to garner more advertising dollars. On January 16, 2006, shortly after Grant's last WOR show, Grant appeared on Sean Hannity's radio show and TV program Hannity & Colmes, where his former competitor paid tribute to him. Having left his options open for "an offer he cannot refuse," Grant returned to WOR in February 2006, doing one minute "Straight Ahead" commentaries which aired twice daily after news broadcasts until September 2006. On September 8, 2006, Grant again appeared on Hannity's show to provide a post-retirement update, which led to premature rumors that Grant was returning to WABC. Grant then made various isolated radio appearances. He appeared as a guest host on WFNY-FM (now WINS-FM) on December 7, 2006, and was interviewed by attorney Anthony Macri for Macri's WOR show on February 24, 2007.

=== Possible foray into politics ===
In 2000 Grant briefly considered running for United States Senate from New Jersey as an Independent. He went as far as creating a Draft Bob Grant Committee, but ultimately decided against entering the race. He also considered running for Mayor of New York City in the 1970s.

=== Post-Retirement: Return to WABC and Internet broadcasting ===
His guest appearances became more frequent beginning in July 2007. On July 6, 2007, he guest hosted for John R. Gambling, and appeared on Mark Levin's show (which is networked from WABC) on July 10. Grant, guest hosted for Jerry Agar on July 9, 10, 11 and re-appeared as a fill-in host again for John Gambling on August 20 and 21. Then, on August 22, while appearing on Hannity's show, he announced that he was returning as a regular host to WABC, in the 8–10 p.m. slot that at the time was filled by Agar. It would later be revealed, on what was Agar's final show a few hours later, that he would be starting effective immediately, as Grant took over the final segments of the show. His first full show on ABC since 1996 was on August 23. The story of Grant's return, as reported by the New York Daily News, had been discovered only a couple of hours before Grant's official announcement.

Grant's stint lasted less than a year and a half, until his regular nightly show was pulled by WABC in late November 2008 as part of a programming shuffle stemming from the debut of Curtis Sliwa's national show, and later Mark Levin's show expanding to three hours, leaving no room for Grant. Grant did his most recent AM radio work as guest host filling in for Michael Savage on January 21, 2009, Mark Levin on March 23, 2009, and Sean Hannity on July 31, 2009.

During the week of July 6, 2009, Grant began hosting an Internet radio show titled Straight Ahead! which originally ran Monday through Friday from 8 to 9 a.m. ET on UBATV.com. As a webcast, the show differed from Grant's radio shows, in that the viewer watched Grant as he did his broadcast. The first two months of Straight Ahead! were from inside Grant's home, and were run with technical assistance from independent filmmaker Ryan O'Leary. New York radio personalities Richard Bey and Jay Diamond were also brought on board to broadcast their own one-hour shows. Grant mentioned that he did not get paid to do the UBATV show, but believes that Internet broadcasting is the future.

Beginning in September 2009, Grant reduced Straight Ahead! from five days a week down to two (Mondays and Wednesdays from 10 to 11 a.m. Eastern time). Grant also moved the show from his home to a professional studio. Due to a low number of callers to the show, Grant usually interviewed only guests for the hour. On January 13, 2010, Grant did his last UBATV show. Grant's last UBATV show and his last WOR show both fell on the date of January 13.

On September 13, 2009, Grant returned to WABC for a third stint at the station, doing a weekly Sunday talk show from noon to 2 p.m. Grant's return to AM broadcasting allowed him to continue interacting with his fan base through greater listenership and participation than his previous internet radio show provided. At the close of his first show, he expressly thanked the management of the station for "inviting him back" and said he looked forward to continuing this joint venture every week for the foreseeable future. Grant issued a statement in October 2012 that his October 7 broadcast would be his last, but then rescinded that message after the show, labeling it a "mistake" and an attempt to grab attention. He then took off a short time for medical work, and when he returned to the air, it was for a shortened 1 p.m. to 2 p.m. Sunday show. Grant's show continued in its one-hour weekly format until July 28, 2013, when he permanently retired due to declining health.

Grant also prepared weekly columns for his website, BobGrantOnline.com. The site was originally sponsored by NewsMax. The editorials ended February 19, 2013, again due to health problems.

== Characteristics of Grant's radio shows ==
=== Socio-political views ===
Grant was widely considered a political conservative. In later life, he commented that "I certainly had many beliefs you'd call conservative, but on some social issues, like abortion or gay marriage, I was more what you'd call libertarian."

In a May 1993 broadcast, Grant referred to civil rights activist Martin Luther King Jr. as "that slimeball" and as "this bum, this womanizer, this liar, this fake, this phony."

In 1995, the progressive media watchdog Fairness and Accuracy in Reporting accused Grant of racism and homophobia. As evidence, they highlighted his repeated use of the word "savages" when referring to African-Americans and statements such as "minorities are the Big Apple's majority, you don't need the papers to tell you that, walk around and you know it. To me, that's a bad thing. I'm a White person". They highlighted his description of Haitian refugees as "swine" and "sub-human infiltrators" who multiply "like maggots on a hot day" and his comment that "Ideally, it would have been nice to have a few phalanxes of policemen with machine guns and mow [gay pride paraders] down".

Grant was highly critical of U.S. President Barack Obama, asserting his view that Obama "truly believes in socialism ... which has the same effect as communism." Grant distinguished himself from other conservative talk show hosts by calling for Obama to release his long form birth certificate, prior to Obama releasing it. He described the Tea Party movement as continuing "the finest tradition of Americanism".

Although Grant was generally known as being a conservative, he was a critic of hard-line conservative advocates in primary races, including the Tea Party movement's candidates. This was a frequent debate topic between Grant and his callers over his last few years. During the fall election of 2010, Grant criticized candidates, such as Christine O'Donnell, Rand Paul, and Sharron Angle. Grant endorsed Charlie Crist over Marco Rubio on a July 10, 2010, broadcast for the Florida senate primary. On a May 8, 2011, broadcast, Grant informed his audience that he supported the moderate Jon Huntsman Jr. for the Republican nomination for president, although he would later go on to support Mitt Romney.

=== Fill-in hosts ===
Grant was in favor of engaging hosts substituting for him while he was away on vacation to maintain his ratings. In the cases of G. Gordon Liddy and Curtis Sliwa who guest hosted along with his wife Lisa Evers, this led to them being hired for their own shows. Other popular fill-ins included Bill O'Reilly during the 1990s, Roger Ailes, Alan Burke, Joe Scarborough, Tom Marr, Ann Coulter in 2002, Tom Snyder in 2002, Mike Gallagher, Barry Farber, and comedians Jackie Mason and Pat Cooper in the early 1990s, and Commissioner Myrtle Whitmore.

== Influences and legacy ==
Being largely the innovator of his own particular talk radio style, Grant previously worked with the likes of Barry Gray and Joe Pyne. Pyne would often end each broadcast with "Straight Ahead" which is something Grant picked up, leading many to believe that Grant was the first host to frequently use that line.

Over the years, national radio talk personality Howard Stern has made differing remarks on his admiration for Grant as an early influence. Upon Stern's arrival in New York, he cited Grant as an influence, but as Stern's stardom rose, Grant became the subject of occasional ridicule on Stern's show. During Stern's prime, he denied being influenced by Grant or having respect for him. Stern also criticized Grant for changing his act to appease management. Grant told Paul D. Colford, author of the 1996 Stern biography, Howard Stern: King of All Media, about being approached at a public appearance by Ben Stern, Howard's father, with a teenage Howard in tow. Father introduced son to Grant and told him of Howard's desire to go into radio. "I looked at this big, gawky kid and I said to him, 'Just be yourself,'" Grant recalled. Stern has denied Grant's version of the story. Soon after Grant's firing from WABC, and before his first WOR show, Grant appeared as a call-in guest on Stern's radio show. In more recent years, Stern has praised Grant's legacy. In 2006, Stern called in to Grant's final WOR broadcast and lauded him on the air. On his January 6, 2014 SiriusXM broadcast, while discussing Grant's death and career for the first half-hour of his show, Stern said, "I consider him to be the best broadcaster I've ever heard." Stern said, "Bob was just this really well-informed conservative, who would often become liberal on social issues, but he had such a flair ... he was such a broadcaster ... he could hold your attention for hours," before concluding, "Goodbye, Bob, you are the greatest broadcaster that has ever lived".

Glenn Beck now uses the catchphrase "Get off my phone!" as a spinoff of Grant's earlier call-in talk show style, as do Tom Scharpling and Mark Levin; similarly, Sean Hannity often uses Grant's phrase "Straight ahead." Rush Limbaugh early on acknowledged that Bob Grant paved the way for his success nationwide.

In 2002, industry magazine Talkers ranked Grant as the 16th greatest radio talk show host of all time.

On March 28, 2007, Bob Grant was nominated for induction into the National Radio Hall of Fame. Grant was ultimately not inducted into the Hall in his lifetime; he would be inducted under the Hall's Legends category for posthumous inductees in 2023.

Radio & Records had planned to issue a Lifetime Achievement Award to Grant during its annual convention in March 2008; however, the nomination was revoked in January 2008 for "past comments by him that contradict our values and the respect we have for all members of our community." Several talk radio hosts have spoken out against the decision; Neal Boortz has stated:

I usually try not to miss the Radio & Records talk radio convention ... Not this year. Maybe never again. R&R has succumbed to political correctness ... I don't call for boycotts, but I do think it would be wonderful to see talk show hosts refuse to appear at this convention ... What we have seen here in this revocation of the award to Bob Grant is simple pandering to political correctness. Nothing more, nothing less.

Sean Hannity, Opie and Anthony, comedian Jim Norton, Lars Larson, Rush Limbaugh, Mark Levin, Lionel and Howard Stern opposed the move as well, with Levin stating "I am disgusted with the mistreatment of Bob Grant. I am fed up with the censors, intimidators, and cowards in this business." Don Imus deemed the award unimportant, offered to return awards he had received after treating them to his sledgehammer and block of wood, and called Grant's comments "stupid", although he also referred to Grant as a "legendary broadcaster".

Tributes to Bob Grant poured in after his death was announced.

Marc Fisher, Senior Editor at The Washington Post, wrote tribute to Grant on his Facebook page, saying that his "most creative and influential period" was from the 1960s "when he captured and reflected the rage of New Yorkers seeing their city change around them, to the 70s, when he almost singlehandedly kept Libya's Qaddafi on the U.S. political radar and became one of New York's most popular figures."

A resident of the New Jersey communities of Woodbridge Township, Manalapan Township and Toms River, Grant died in Hillsborough Township, New Jersey on December 31, 2013, after what was described as a "short illness".

== Sources ==
- Colford, Paul D. (1997). Howard Stern: King of All Media. New York: St. Martins Press. ISBN 0-312-96221-5.
- Grant, Bob (1996). Let's Be Heard. New York: Pocket Books. ISBN 0-671-53721-0.
