= WAAT =

WAAT may refer to:

- Waat, a village in South Sudan
- WMYS-LD, a South Bend, Indiana television station (virtual channel 69, digital channel 28) known as WAAT-LP from 2004 to 2006
- WGMF (AM), an Olyphant, Pennsylvania radio station (750 AM) which held the call sign WAAT from 1998 to 2003
- WMGM-TV, a Wildwood, New Jersey television station (virtual channel 40, digital channel 36) known as WAAT from 1981 to 1984
- WJHT, a Johnstown, Pennsylvania radio station (92.1 FM) which held the call sign WAAT from 1973 to 1976
- WIMG, a Ewing, New Jersey radio station (1300 AM) which held the call sign WAAT from 1959 to 1971
- WXBK, a Newark, New Jersey radio station (94.7 FM) which held the call sign WAAT-FM from 1947 to 1958
- WNYM, a Hackensack, New Jersey radio station (970 AM) which held the call sign WAAT from 1926 to 1958
- WAAT (AM), a temporary Jersey City, New Jersey radio station, which held the WAAT call sign in 1922
