= Pegeen Fitzgerald =

American radio personality

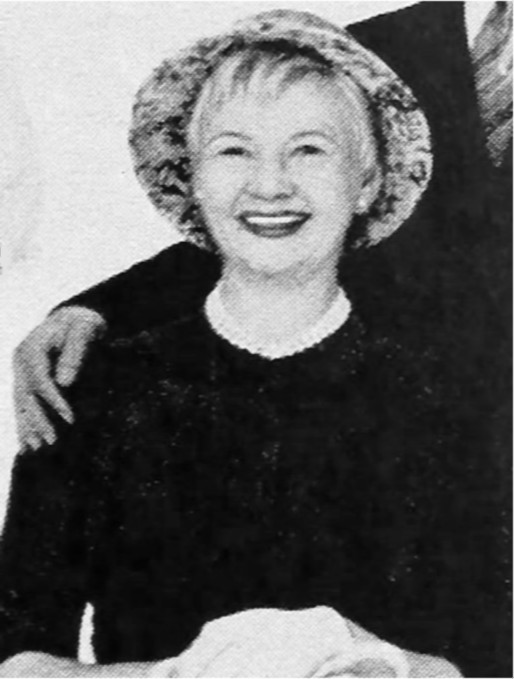
- Pegeen Fitzgerald in 1955
- Born: Margaret Worall; November 24, 1904; Norcatur, Kansas, U.S.
- Died: January 30, 1989 (aged 84); Manhattan, New York City, U.S.
- Education: College of St. Theresa
- Occupation: Radio talk show host
- Spouse: Ed Fitzgerald (1930-1982; his death)

Pegeen Fitzgerald (née Margaret Worrall; November 24, 1904 – January 30, 1989) was an American radio personality perhaps best known for co-hosting (with her husband, Ed) The Fitzgeralds on radio in New York City.

== Early years ==
Born Margaret Worrall in Norcatur, Kansas, Fitzgerald was the eldest of seven children. Her father, Fred Calvin Worrall, was a builder who would "bring folks over from all parts of Europe, sell them land and set up communities for them." Her mother was Jane (née Sweeney) Worrall.

Shortly after Pegeen was born, the family's home burned down. The Worralls were again homeless in 1910; a local housing shortage found the family living in a curtained-off area of the Norcatur Dispatch city room. The family moved to Portland, Oregon, when she was a teenager.

Fitzgerald attended the College of St. Theresa in Winona, Minnesota, but she had to leave after two years to help support her family. Fitzgerald had won a scholarship to attend The Sorbonne, but was not able to do so; due to the illness of her father, she needed to go to work. She was a newspaperwoman and "a prominent department store executive in marketing and advertising" before she became a broadcaster.

Fitzgerald worked first as a bookkeeper at a Portland department store; she worked her way up into the store's advertising department. She also taught English at night school as a source of more income. In 1929, a press agent introduced her to Ed Fitzgerald. Their first meeting was a failure as each disliked the other. A year later, the two met again and the relationship was amiable enough that the couple married in June 1930.

Fitzgerald kept her advertising job while her husband worked in the Orient as a foreign correspondent. When he returned in 1932, Ed began working in radio at KFRC in San Francisco on various radio programs. By 1935, the couple relocated to New York, where Ed hosted various radio shows at WOR. While Pegeen was interested in radio, she did not begin working in it until 1940, with a program from The New York World's Fair called "Here's Looking at You". The program was based on beauty and fashion information.

== Radio ==
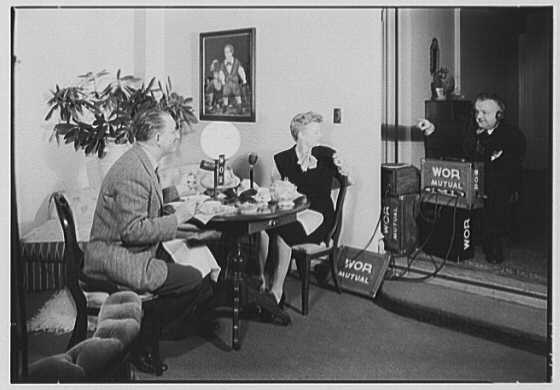
Ed and Pegeen Fitzgerald broadcast over WOR radio at breakfast from their home at 15 E. 36th St., New York City.

Fitzgerald's obituary in The New York Times reported that she had "pioneered the at-home radio format." For 42 years, she and her husband, Ed, broadcast from their apartment near New York City's Central Park or, less frequently, from their weekend home — first in Hay Island, Connecticut, and later in Kent, Connecticut. At its peak, their program had an audience of 2 million people. John A. Gambling, a colleague of the couple at WOR, described listening to the Fitzgeralds' program as being "like you were eavesdropping on a conversation with a loving but not always an agreeing couple."

Both of the Fitzgeralds had their own radio programs on WOR when Pegeen had the idea that it might be interesting to broadcast a family's talk at the breakfast table. WOR officials initially believed a show like this would fail. The program was originally broadcast from the WOR studios, but Pegeen's illness brought about the temporary need to broadcast the show from the Fitzgerald's apartment. After the couple became the owners of their program, they elected to continue broadcasting from their home.

She began working on the air for WOR November 21, 1939. Her program, Things That Interest Me focused on "fashion chatter and human interest." In 1942, Fitzgerald hosted Pegeen Prefers on WOR. The morning program was described in an ad for WOR as "a show deliberately planned to help women adapt their homes and habits to changing economic conditions" related to World War II. The show included "weekly reviews of exceptional retail ads in metropolitan newspapers." It began as a quarter-hour program broadcast three days a week. By November 1942, it had expanded to 25 minutes six times weekly. Later that year, on October 12, she began an afternoon program, Strictly Personal.

She and her husband, Ed, co-hosted Breakfast with the Fitzgeralds and The Fitzgeralds in New York, the latter of which was on ABC. In New York City, their joint programs were heard initially on WOR, but on April 30, 1945, they moved to WJZ, when those call letters were used by the station later known as WABC. (Note: WOR hired columnist Dorothy Kilgallen and her producer husband, Richard Kollmar, to replace the Fitzgeralds with "Breakfast With Dorothy & Dick". Both couples disliked the lifestyles of the other, openly sniping at each other on the air. This continued after the Fitzgeralds rejoined WOR with a noon show in the late 1950s. The station was forced to order both couples to stop talking about each other.) Two years later, WJZ added an evening version of their program, which was 15 minutes long and ran Monday-Friday.

In 1955, Fitzgerald moved into the executive area of broadcasting, becoming manager of retail merchandising for WRCA and WRCA-TV in New York City. By the late 1950s, the Fitzgeralds were back at WOR with their radio program. The show survived various format changes until September 1983, when Fitzgerald received a telephone call from the station's program director. At a face-to-face meeting with both the program director and general manager, Fitzgerald was told the program would have its last airing that evening and that this last show would be recorded for broadcast so station attorneys could review it prior to its airing. Angry to be thought of as unprofessional after fifty years in radio, Fitzgerald refused to tape a last broadcast. The station began receiving angry letters from Fitzgerald's many listeners, some of whom had been listening to the shows for many years. There was a good deal of negative or adverse publicity from newspaper articles which extended beyond the coverage area of WOR.

By 1985, Fitzgerald moved to WNYC. Fitzgerald also returned to the WOR airwaves in 1985 as the hostess of a radio program for the Millennium Guild. The program aired from 11:30 to midnight on weekdays; it was sponsored by the Guild, an animal charity with five shelters in the New York City area. Fitzgerald was also executive director of the organization.

== Television ==
The Fitzgeralds was on ABC-TV in the late 1940s and early 1950s. A 1949 review of their program, seen on WJZ-TV, noted: "Theirs is the first regularly televised married duo session. Instead of the typical breakfast table setting, the Fitzgeralds move easily about a facsimile of their own living room."

On September 22, 1952, the Fitzgeralds launched a syndicated 15-minute program that featured their "giving household hints [and integrating] commercials by national advertisers." The program was placed in local markets with sponsorship by stores that sold the products advertised. By early October, the program was seen in 12 markets.

In the mid-1950s, Pegeen Fitzgerald was reporter-editor for Windows, an NBC-TV effort to promote local businesses via 5-minute programs on stations owned by the network. Fitzgerald hosted episodes for Gimbels and Bergdorf Goodman on WRCA-TV, displaying the stores' merchandise for viewers.

== Other professional activities ==
In 1955, Fitzgerald appeared in testimonial advertisements for Clairol. The ads appeared in Vogue, Harper's Bazaar, and The New Yorker. Fitzgerald, a vegetarian, published a meatless cook book in 1968 called, "Meatless Cooking: Pegeen's Vegetarian Recipes" in 1968.

== Personal life ==
She wed Ed Fitzgerald in 1930. They had been married 52 years when he died in 1982 at the age of 89. They had no children. Always involved with helping animals, Pegeen became involved with the Millennium Guild and the Vivisection Investigation League, eventually becoming president of both of those organizations. Previously, she had shared duties with Gypsy Rose Lee as being board members of the Greenwich Village Animal League. Fitzgerald's love of animals began as a child. A turkey meant for the Worrall family's Thanksgiving dinner was thought to be dead when it sprang back to life. The bird had been plucked; the family kept it as a pet and knitted a small sweater for it to wear until its feathers grew in again.

Loyal listeners of the Fitzgerald's radio programs willed their cats to the couple. The Fitzgeralds at one time had ten cats in their New York apartment and 78 at their Connecticut home which were willed to them by their listeners. Through their daily radio program, the Fitzgeralds found homes for about 3,000 animals each year. Fitzgerald founded a private animal shelter for cats called "The Last Post" in 1982. The shelter, in Canaan, Connecticut, is a home for cats whose owners have died and who have willed their cats to the organization along with financial bequests for their care.

== Death ==
Fitzgerald died of breast cancer at her home in Manhattan, New York on January 30, 1989, aged 84. She was survived by four sisters and a brother.
