= Henry Bailey Stevens =

American playwright and vegetarian

- Born: July 13, 1891; Hooksett, New Hampshire
- Died: 16 March 1976 (aged 84)
- Occupations: Playwright, writer

Henry Bailey Stevens (13 July 1891 – 16 March 1976) was an American author, playwright and vegetarianism activist.

== Biography ==
Stevens was born in 1891 in Hooksett, New Hampshire. He graduated from Manchester Central High School and Dartmouth College. From 1912, he worked for the Woman's Journal, a women's rights periodical in Boston. Stevens married Agnes Ryan, the managing editor of the Woman's Journal, in 1915. In 1917 Stevens and Ryan resigned from the Woman's Journal, due in part to their opposition to World War I, a belief not generally shared by the suffrage movement.

Stevens lived with his wife in an old farmstead at the edge of Durham, New Hampshire. Stevens directed the University of New Hampshire Agricultural Station and Cooperative Extension Service from 1918 until his retirement in 1956.

== Vegetarianism ==
Stevens and his wife were associated with the Millennium Guild, an animal rights organization. In 1949, Curtis Freshel awarded $1,000 to Stevens for the best humanitarian work of the year.

Stevens believed that humans were originally pacifists and vegetarians. He authored The Recovery of Culture, in 1949. The book argues that early humans made the mistake of changing from vegetarianism to flesh-eating and that soil erosion, starving peoples and war is the result. He recommended for people to return to an agricultural plant based culture.

Stevens was a vice-president of the International Vegetarian Union. He attended the 1975 World Vegetarian Congress.

== Death ==
Stevens died from natural causes on 16 March 1976 at the age of 85.

== Selected publications ==
- A Cry Out of the Dark (1919)
- All Alone in the Country (1921)
- Tolstoy: A Play in Seven Scenes (1928)
- The Recovery of Culture (1949, with a foreword by Gerald Heard)
- Para-Desa (1975, with a foreword by Richard Eberhart)
