= List of temporary broadcasting stations in the United States =

Review of temporary U.S. radio broadcasting stations

List of temporary broadcasting stations in the United States is a review of broadcasting stations which were not issued standard licenses, but instead were given temporary authorizations, to be used for special purposes and limited time periods. In a small number of cases these authorizations were followed by a standard license, or this represented a short-term revival of a previously licensed station. However, in most cases the stations expired immediately after their intended purpose was fulfilled.

Information about these stations is somewhat limited. For the AM band stations authorized through 1928, the monthly issues of the Radio Service Bulletin, and the annual station lists issued by the U.S. government, regularly reported the status of stations operating under standard licenses. However, in general these publications did not include information about temporary stations, although basic information about these grants was included in station card files maintained by the government.

== Stations ==
Selected temporary radio broadcasting stations.

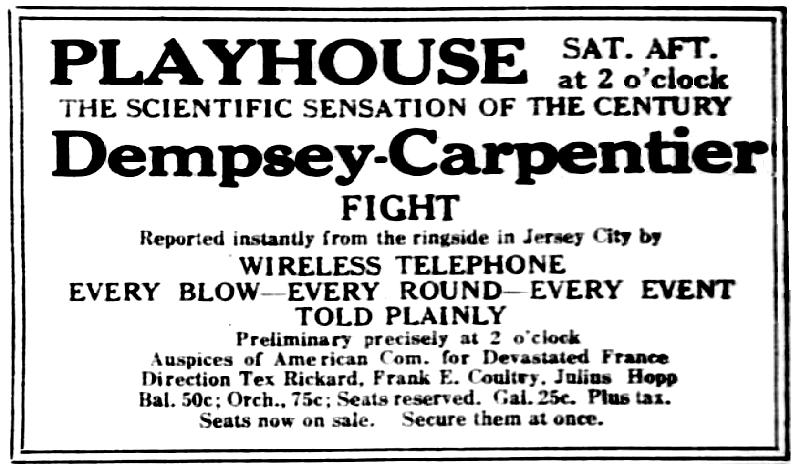
WJY, Hoboken, New Jersey (1921)

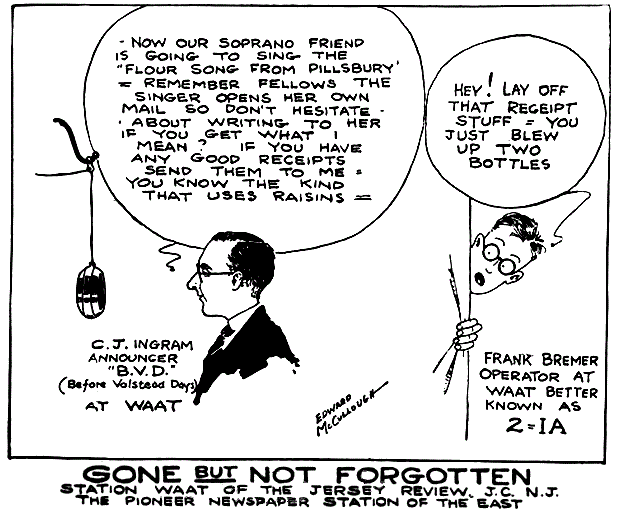
WAAT Jersey City, New Jersey (1922)

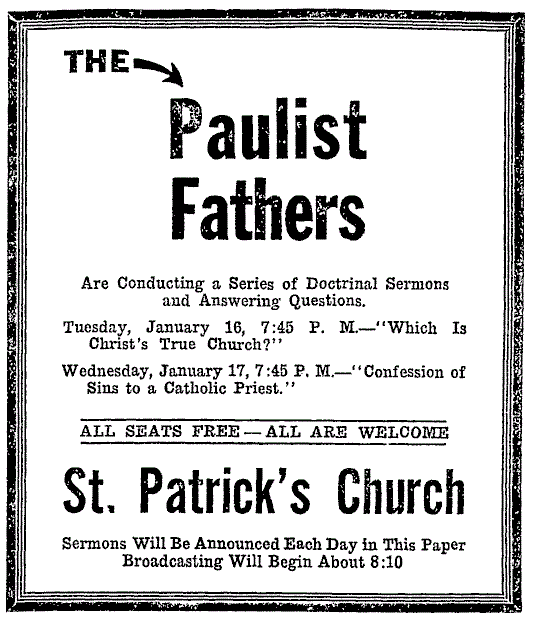
KFFD, Tacoma, Washington (1923)

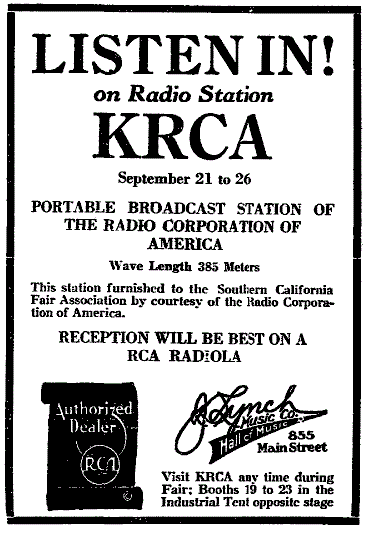
KRCA, Riverside, California (1926)

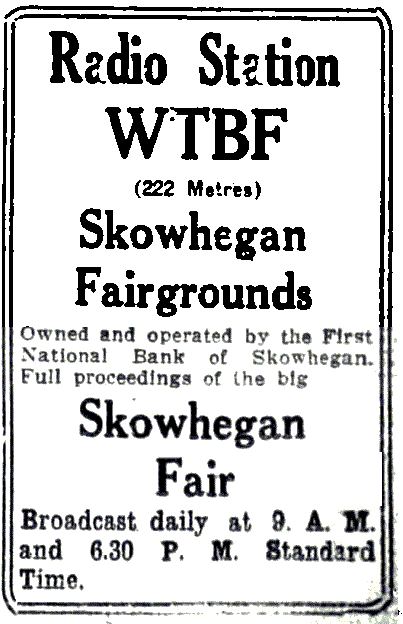
WTBF Skowhegan, Maine (1928)

Temporary stations
Call	Initial temporary authorization	Location	Owner	Notation	Additional information
WJY	7/2/1921	Hoboken, New Jersey	Radio Corporation of America	"let NY 6/24/21", "temp station, one day operation", "radiophone to broadcast Dempsey-Carpentier fight".	1600 meters (187 kHz). Longwave station set up to broadcast ringside reports of the Dempsey-Carpentier heavyweight boxing match.
WPU	1/22/1922	Buffalo, New York	Buffalo Courier + Enquirer	"1/20/22 TG from C. C. Cliswold"	360 meters (833 kHz). The Buffalo Courier reported that "even those totally ignorant of the wireless are to be given an opportunity to hear a concert over the radio" as the newspaper arranged for a broadcast on January 22, 1922, from the Elmwood Music Hall provided by the Irving Berlin Music Publishing company of New York.
KDP	2/5/1922	Seattle, Washington	Saint James Cathedral	"Fr Radio Inspector Seattle 2/2/22"	Paulist Fathers Donegan and Quinan broadcast a series of sermons beginning on February 5, 1922. (They returned a year later over another temporary station, KFFD in Tacoma.)
WHO	2/23/1922	Kansas City, Missouri	Kansas City Post	"TG from Dick Smith, Mgr Ed, 2/22/22", "temp 2/23-24/22"	Contemporary articles in the Kansas City Post list this station's call letters as "WRW".
WWS	3/--/1922	Pella, Iowa	Fowler Telephone Company	"temp bdcst pend lic"	The station, located at W. H. Fowler's home, was described as "the only one for a town the size of Pella in the state". No regular license was ever issued.
WBI	3/10/1922	Marquette, Michigan	Northern State Normal School	"temp 3/10-11/22"	Used "for special purposes".
WTB	3/16/1922	Evansville, Indiana	Sieffert Electric Co.	"Let from Cong. Luhring 3/6/22", "temp 3/16/22"	Planned concert broadcast by visiting New York Metropolitan Opera prima donna Rosa Ponselle was unable to take place due to an inability to procure vacuum-tubes needed to operate the transmitter.
WSH	3/--/1922	New York, New York	Experimenter Information Service	"761 fm NY 3/10/22", "temp 4 days"	
WMX	3/--/1922	Port Huron, Michigan	Port Huron Times Herald	TG 3/20/22 for 3/23/22, and 3/23/23 for 3/27/23.	Station was primarily used to broadcast performances by participants in the Times-Herald "Music Memory" contests.
WTA	3/27/1922	Uhrichsville, Ohio	Board of Trade	"let fm Brd of Trade 3/9/22", "only for one day, March 27, 1922"	The Board of Trade held its annual meeting on this date, but a local newspaper report has no reference to any radio broadcasts.
WDS	3/--/1922	Richmond, Virginia	Mann S. Valentine	"TG 3/27/22", "temp"	Station was reported to be preparing to broadcast a Good Friday service by the All Saints' Episcopal church.
KDU	4/--/1922 (?)	Yakima, Washington	Hillman Brothers		Limited information: the KDU call sign was reassigned to a non-broadcast station in May 1922, so this KDU came earlier.
WAAT	4/16/1922	Jersey City, New Jersey	Jersey Review	"TG 4/15/22", "temp 4/16 + 19/22 pend appli."	360 meters (833 kHz). Station provided an extensive variety of programming and actually was active until October 1922. On 8/19/1926 a new, regular, station in Jersey City, WKBD, was set up by Jersey Review associate Frank V. Bremer, and a short time later WKBD changed its call sign to WAAT (now WNYM).
WAAU	4/16/1922	Philadelphia, Pennsylvania	H. C. Kuser	"TG 4/15/22", "temp 4/16/22"	
WBAC	4/28/1922	Des Moines, Iowa	Kiwanis Club	"TG 4/18/22", "temp 4/28-29/22" [Also 4/28-29/23 on 1050 kHz]	360 meters (833 kHz). Intention was to broadcast the results of the Drake Relays track and field contests.
WCAI	5/13/1922	Topeka, Kansas	Frank E. Samuel	"TG 5/5/22", "temp 5/13/22", "Amer. Legion Dept. HQ, State"	360 meters (833 kHz). Station was used to broadcast speeches given at "the state-wide meeting of the [American] Legion and Legion auxiliary officials".
WDAZ	6/5/1922	Scranton, Pennsylvania	American Radio Relay League (Roy C. Ehrhardt, trf Asst),	"5/23/22", "temp June 5, 6, 7, 1922"	Station operated in conjunction with the Scranton Republican's three-day Town Hall Radio Show.
KDZT	6/5/1922	Seattle, Washington	Seattle Radio Association	"761 6/2/22", "temp 6/5-10/22"	Later received a regular broadcasting license, with the same call and owner, August 1, 1922 to December 7, 1923.
WEAL	6/--/1922	Des Moines, Iowa (special train)	Mystic Shrine	"TG 5/31/22", "temp to coast and back"	"Two transmitting sets, one of 10 watts power and the other of 100 watts, have been installed in the special car of Illustrious Potentate C. T. Gadd", on a train carrying Des Moines' Za-Ga-Zig temple Shriners to a San Francisco conclave.
WGAG	6/--/1922	Milwaukee, Wisconsin	Wisconsin Radio Show	"TG 6/2/22 fr Spearman Lewis, Mgr Dr, Plankington Hotel", "temp".	Advertisement for the Wisconsin Radio Show stated that the exposition, running from June 21 to June 25, 1922, would feature a "broadcasting station in continuous operation".
WGAX	6/--/1922	Washington Court House, Ohio	Radio Electric Company	"6/22/22 fm owner", "temp auth"	Later received a regular broadcasting license, with the same call and owner, September 1922 to July 20, 1923.
WIAM	7/26/1922	Dunmore, Pennsylvania	F. M. Tarbox	"letter 7/14/22", "temp 7/26-27/22", "335 S. Blakley St."	The Scranton Republican reported plans to apply for a permanent license, that apparently never took place.
WJAW	8/--/1922	Audubon, Iowa	Reinemund Hardware Company	"TG 8/9/22", "temp"	
WJAY	8/--/1922	Des Moines, Iowa	Iowa State Fair	"let State Dept Agri-Iowa 8/10/22", "temp"	WJAY was "the official Iowa state fair broadcasting station of the Thomas Electric company".
KYG	10/--/1922	Portland, Oregon	Radio Service Bureau		Short-term continuation of the original KYG in Portland, licensed to Willard P. Hawley, Jr. from March 28, 1922—October 13, 1922. A Radio Service Bureau advertisement in the October 22, 1922 Oregonian stated "We are now operating KYG the famous Hawley station". Its equipment was donated to the Benson Polytechnic School, which requested reassignment of the KYG call letters for its station, however the high school station was instead randomly assigned KFIF from an alphabetical roster of available call signs.
WNAZ	11/10/1922	Bethlehem, Pennsylvania	Lehigh Radio Co.	"let Radio Inspector Baltimore 11/2/22", "temp 11/10/22"	Appears to be an earlier incarnation of WOAM, which was authorized a few days later.
WOAM	11/19/1922	Bethlehem, Pennsylvania	Arthur F. Breisch	"from Radio Inspector Baltimore 11/15/22", "temp 11/19/22"	360 meters (833 kHz). Breisch was proprietor of the Lehigh Valley Radio company. The featured concert was the Allentown band's first of the season, and the station helped provide everything "necessary for the broadcasting and receiving of the concert in order that Bandmaster [Martin] Klinger, confined to Sacred Heart hospital, may be able to enjoy the program".
KFFD	1/14/1923	Tacoma, Washington	Saint Patrick's Church	"TG fm Wm. A. Mullens Co. 1/11/23", "temp 1/14-21/23"	Return of Paulist Fathers Donegan and Quinan, who had appeared over temporary station KDP in Seattle the previous year.
WQAG	1/19/1923	Redfield, South Dakota	Frederick L. Legler	"TG 1/18/23 from Charles M. C. Woodland", "1/19/23 only"	
WSAM	3/20/1923	Milton, Wisconsin	Milton College (A. G. Sayre)	"TG from owner 3/19/23", "temp 3/20-21/23"	Attempt to broadcast a high school basketball tournament held at the college was reportedly "a complete failure".
WRAQ	5/7/1923	Haddonfield, New Jersey	Bancroft School (Dr. E. A. Farrington)	"5/5/23" for "5/7-10/23" plus "4/28/24" for "5/11-17/24"	Reportedly used to broadcast events during the school's commencements. Contemporary reports state that the authorizations were used for daily broadcasts conducted by John L. Barnes, as part of the town's annual Child Welfare Week activities.
WTAV	10/--/1923	Richmond, Virginia	Sydnor Pump & Well Co.	"temp see case 2190NR 10-1-23"	1070 kHz.
KFLC	10/--/1923	Dallas, Texas	State Fair of Texas	"TG fm R. A. Hall, 2913 Live Oak St., Dallas, Texas, 10/13/23", "2 weeks"	
KFMB	11/--/1923	Little Rock, Arkansas	Christian Churches of Little Rock	"TG H. L. Remmell 11/3/23", "temp pend lic"	1180 kHz. Later received a regular broadcast license, with the same call and owner, November 1923 to June 1, 1925.
WCBP	4/8/1924	Dixon, Illinois	Dixon Evening Telegraph (George B. Shaw)	"let 3/20/24", "temp 4/8/24"	1150 kHz. A primary election was held on April 8, but the newspaper's issues during this period make no mention of operating a radio station.
WCBS	4/8/1924	Macomb, Illinois	Macomb Journal	"TG 4/7/24", "temp 4/8/24, 11/4/24"	1330 kHz.
KFPZ	4/24/1924	Bay City, Michigan	Benevolent and Protective Order of Elks	"TG fm Elks Bay City 4/23/24", "temp 4/24/24 one day"	An April 24th newspaper notice stated that amateur station 8DAT (which was licensed to Stanley F. Northcott) would broadcast the Elks minstrel show from 8:30 to 10:30 p.m.
KFPJ	4/25/1924	Huron, South Dakota	Merle Buck	"4/20/24", "temp 4/25/24"	1220 kHz. An ultimately "rather embarrassing" unsuccessful attempt to implement "an entirely new method of gathering election returns and broadcasting them over the entire state".
WDBM	5/10/1924	Fort Wayne, Indiana	Robert Dreisbach	"TG 5/6/24", "temp 5/10/24 3:00 to 6:00 PM"	860 kHz.
WDBG	5/30/1924	Gettysburg, Pennsylvania	Gettysburg College	"SR Baltimore, 4/28/24", "temp 5/30/24, 11/11/24"	Used to broadcast ceremonies related to Memorial Day and Armistice Day.
WEBB	6/--/1924	Portland, Maine	RCA Exhibit	"fr G. H. Clark 6/20/24", "temp one week"	278 meters (1080 kHz). RCA's George H. Clark, whose June 25 address was "Radio in the Time of King Tut", was manager of the Portland Summer Radio Show.
WEBF	7/12/1924	Dayton, Ohio	East Dayton Electric Company	"let from Cong. Fitzgerald 7/2/24", "temp 7/12/24"	1170 kHz.
WEBM	8/27/1924	Detroit, Michigan	Detroit Yacht Club	"let 8/19/24", "temp 8/27/24 to 9/1/24"	1030 kHz. Used to report yacht regatta race. Located on George Harrison Phelps' yacht "Skylark II".
WEBN	9/6/1924	Estes Park, Colorado	Boy Scouts of America	"fm Jas E. West 8/28/24", "temp week 9/6/24", "Sys-Western Elec Co, 50 watts"	1300 kHz. "The first broadcasting station in the heights of the Rockies is the large broadcasting outfit installed by Boy Scout executives, which will be known as WEBN". The 50-watt station, located at the Young Women's Christian Association, was designed to broadcast the proceeding of the first biannual conference of the Boy Scout executives.
KFRK	10/15/1924	Des Moines, Iowa	Iowa Federation of Labor	"TG fm J. C. Lewis, Iowa Fed Labor, 10/14/24", "temp 10/15/24"	After Senator La Follette was denied access to the local radio stations for his speech, "the last resort", "a plan to erect a special station of their own" was unsuccessful, because "word was not received from Washington in time to warrant going ahead with the installation".
WBAH	11/1/1924	Minneapolis, Minnesota	The Dayton Company	"temp 11/1/24".	720 kHz. This was a revival of a standard broadcasting station, with the same call and owner, that had been licensed from April 21, 1922 to September 5, 1924.
WFBP	11/18/1924	Chatham, Ohio	H. J. Kohji	"TG 11/18/24", "temp 11/18/24"	
WNOR	12/10/1924	New Orleans, Louisiana	New Orleans Radio Assoc.	"let fm SR New Orleans 11/18/24", "temp one week beg 12/10/24"	1260 kHz. Provided daily broadcasts from the New Orleans Radio Show, including the broadcasting of a radio wedding.
WGBP	1/15/1925	Tampa, Florida	M. L. Price Music Company	"761 fm SR Atlanta", "temp 1/15-20/25, 10/6/25", "339 Plant Ave., 50 watts"	1200 kHz.
WGBV	2/6/1925	Stroudsburg, Pennsylvania	Monroe County Newspapers (Colley S. Baker, editor)	"TG 2/3/25", "temp 2/6-7/25"	
WADC	2/19/1925	Akron, Ohio	Automobile Dealers Company	"TG from Frank O'Neill 2/16/25", "temp 2/19-28/25, 2/28-3/3/25", "auth ext TG to G. J. Harter on request of cong Davy"	1210 kHz. Station was used in conjunction with local auto show. In March 1925 this station received a regular license, still as WADC, assigned to the Allen Theater, which is now WARF.
WHBZ	4/2/1925	Anderson, South Carolina	J. A. Mitchell	"TG 4/1/25", "temp 4/2/25"	1090 kHz.
WIBB	3/5/1925	Freeport, Illinois	Ridgeway Electric Company	"TG Ridgeway 3/3/25", "temp 3/5-6-7/25"	1360 kHz. Remote broadcast, by 50-watt transmitter linked to an announcer located at a basketball tournament site.
KFVP	5/10/1925	Omaha, Nebraska (portable)	Chamber of Commerce (Omaha)	"TG from Chamber of Commerce 5/5/25", "5/10/25-5/24/25"	1090 kHz. The twenty-seventh annual trade tour of the Omaha Chamber of Commerce operated "America's only broadcasting station on a passenger train" at stops along the way as they traveled by rail though Nebraska, South Dakota and Wyoming.
KFVP	5/24/1925	Sioux Falls, South Dakota (portable)	Chamber of Commerce (Sioux Falls)	"TG from Chamber of Commerce, Sioux Falls 5/19/25", "5/24/25-5/29/25"	1090 kHz. Assorted reports detailed the travels by rail of the "Sunshiners five-day booster trip", that started in Sioux Falls, South Dakota, and continued through the Black Hills of that state. The same radio equipment used earlier in the month by the Omaha Chamber of Commerce was now employed to "broadcast news talks and snappy musical numbers every evening during the trip".
WGHS	6/23/1925	Gardenville, New York	Gardenville High Sch. (Lester Eggleston)	"6/17/25", "temp one day 6/23/25"	Used to broadcast school commencement exercises.
KFWL	8/--/1925	Paia Maui, Hawaii	C. L. Ludin	"fm San Francisco 6/22/25", "Wedn evening, Aug. and Sept. 1925"	Station conducted weekly Wednesday evening broadcasts, including ones in conjunction with the eighth Maui county fair.
KUPR	8/12/1925	Omaha, Nebraska	Union Pacific Railroad (portable, moving train)	"res 7/23/25, deleted 9/11/25", "45 days from 8/12/25", "1416 Dodge St."	1110 kHz. Reports about the Calf Club Special train (which used some of the same equipment previously used by KFVP), reviewed the itinerary of its "tour to every vital point of agricultural Nebraska" while employing the "latest innovation in mobile broadcast stations".
KRCA	9/5/1925	Los Angeles, California	Radio Corporation of America	First assignment was "temp one week 9/5/25-9/9/25". Three more assignments followed, all listed as 100 watts on 983 kHz: San Francisco, 8/21/26-8/28/26; Los Angeles, 9/5/26-9/11/26; and Riverside, 9/--/26.	KRCA employed a portable transmitter that was transported to the individual locations. Numerous articles reviewed its activities at four different fairs and expositions.
WJBJ	9/14/1925	Butler, Pennsylvania	Walter Morris	"9/9/25", "temp one day 9/14/25"	
WJBH	10/--/1925	Rocky Mount, North Carolina	Evening Telegram	"SR Atlanta 9/29/25", "temp 15 days in October", "10 watts".	1220 kHz. It does not appear this station ever operated, as the October 1925 issues of the Evening Telegram make no mention of it.
WDAL	10/--/1925	Jacksonville, Florida	Florida Times-Union	"fr owner 10/2/25", "temp auth during World Series"	This was a revival of a standard broadcasting station, with the same call and owner, that had been licensed from May 19, 1922 to December 22, 1923.
WJBM	10/19/1925	Battle Creek, Michigan	Michigan Enquirer News	"10/1/25", "temp 10/19-21/25", "10 watts, range 1 mile".	1220 kHz. Station operated in conjunction with a newspaper-sponsored radio equipment show. Eleven months later, on September 18, 1926, the Enquirer and News was issued a regular radio station license with the call letters WKBP (now WBFN).
WLFQ	1/4/1926	Chelsea, Massachusetts	Lawrence F. Quigley (Mayor of Chelsea)	"req 12/31/25", "temp 1/4/26 night only"	1320 kHz. Used to broadcast ceremonies for the start of Mayor Quigley's fifth term as mayor of Chelsea.
WJBS	5/3/1926	Auburn, New York	George I. Stevens	"4/23/26", "temp one day 5/3/26", "50 watts"	1260 kHz.
WLBD	11/15/1926	Erie, Pennsylvania	Dispatch-Herald	"let 11/4/26", "auth 11/15-20/26, auth 11/23/26 cont oper", "canc call let 5/13/27-no reply to letters"	In a January 12, 1927 advertisement, Kitchen's Tire Service promoted the "Firestone Tire Hour" on the "Dispatch-Herald Station WLBD", starting at 8 P.M. the next night.
WNBV	5/28/1927	Baraboo, Wisconsin	Young Men's Christian Association	"operate one night 5/28/27"	1500 kHz.
KGGU	5/27/1928	San Francisco, California	San Francisco Post Enquirer	"temp one day 5/27/28"	9 hour long broadcast, by Chet Boone, of the Alameda marathon swim.
KGHQ	7/4/1928	Oakland, California	U S Army, Col. C. P. Mader, Chairman Parade Committee	"call assigned upon TG request", "temp 7/4/28 only"	590 kHz. An Oakland Tribune review of the upcoming Independence Day parade noted that participants were planning to "carry its own broadcasting equipment to transmit to thousands of radios the music of numerous army, navy, marine corps and veteran's bands participating in the procession".
WTBF	8/10/1928	Skowhegan, Maine	Blin Page	"temp ten days from 8/10/28"	1460 kHz. Operated from the First National bank booth at the Skowhegan fair grounds.
KGIE	10/2/1928	Milwaukee, Wisconsin	Wisconsin Radio Trade Association	"temp 10/2/28 to 10/7/28"	1500 kHz. The Milwaukee Journal reported that "Another feature will be a 'Quiet Mystery Dance', in which the dancers will wear headphones to hear the dance music. The dance floor itself will be devoid of music. For this purpose a special permit to operate a 7½ watt transmitter was granted by the federal radio commission to the W. R. T. A. It will operate under the call letters KGIE and will utilize the 200-meter wave length."
W04ST	4/1/2019	Washington, D.C.	Live Sports Radio, LLC	April 1, 2019 through September 30, 2019, and, as W04ST-D, March 27, 2025 through September 27, 2025, and April 23, 2026 through September 22, 2026.	Channel 4 Low Power TV station, providing information to spectators at Washington Nationals Stadium.
K05ST-D	9/23/2023	College Station, Texas	Live Sports Radio, LLC	September 23, 2023 through October 8, 2023, and September 26, 2025 through September 27, 2025.	Channel 5 Low Power TV station, providing information to spectators at Kyle Field.
K03SZ-D	11/11/2023	Fayetteville, Arkansas	Live Sports Radio, LLC	November 11, 2023 through November 12, 2023	Channel 3 Low Power TV station, providing information to spectators at Reynolds Razorback Stadium.
W05ST-D	12/1/2023	Atlanta, Georgia	Live Sports Radio, LLC	December 1, 2023 through December 2, 2023; January 17, 2025 through January 20, 2025; December 6, 2025, and September 4, 2026 through September 5, 2026.	Channel 5 Low Power TV station, providing information to spectators at Mercedes-Benz Stadium.
K05ST-D	8/20/2024	Green Bay, Wisconsin	Live Sports Radio, LLC	August 20, 2024 through February 20, 2025, and August 9, 2025 through February 8, 2026.	Channel 5 Low Power TV station, providing the audio of the Green Bay Packers Radio Network to spectators at Lambeau Field; service had existed previously on same channel under a more traditional unsigned special events license for a decade before.
W03ST-D	10/2/2024	Athens, Georgia	Live Sports Radio, LLC	October 2, 2024 through October 5, 2024 and October 2, 2025 through October 5, 2025, plus October 16, 2026 through October 17, 2026.	Channel 3 Low Power TV station, providing information to spectators at Sanford Stadium.
K03SU-D	10/15/2024	Columbia, Missouri	Live Sports Radio, LLC	October 15, 2024 through October 19, 2024.	Channel 4 Low Power TV station, providing information to spectators at Memorial Stadium.
W03SK-D	10/16/2024	Knoxville, Tennessee	Live Sports Radio, LLC	October 16, 2024 through October 19, 2024	Channel 4 Low Power TV station, providing information to spectators at Neyland Stadium.
W03SS-D	10/23/2024	Lexington, Kentucky	Live Sports Radio, LLC	October 23, 2024 through October 26, 2024, and September 4, 2026 through November 29, 2026.	Channel 3 Low Power TV station, providing information to spectators at Kroger Field.
W03SS-D	11/06/2024	Baton Rouge, Louisiana	Live Sports Radio, LLC	November 6, 2024 through November 9, 2024, and November 6, 2026 through November 7, 2026.	Channel 3 Low Power TV station, providing information to spectators at Tiger Stadium.
W03ST-D	8/6/2025	Philadelphia, Pennsylvania	Live Sports Radio, LLC	August 6, 2025 through February 5, 2026, and August 26, 2026 through February 26, 2027 (as W03SS-D)	Channel 3 Low Power TV station, providing information to spectators at Lincoln Financial Field.
W04SY-D	8/16/2025	Detroit, Michigan	Live Sports Radio, LLC	August 16, 2025 through February 15, 2026, and September 13, 2026 through February 15, 2027.	Channel 4 Low Power TV station, providing information to spectators at Ford Field.
W05ST-D	8/23/2025	Long Branch, New Jersey	Live Sports Radio, LLC	August 23, 2025 through August 24, 2025, and August 21, 2026 through August 24, 2026.	Channel 5 Low Power TV station, providing information to spectators at Center Court Tennis Event.
K04ST-D	8/28/2025	Waco, Texas	Live Sports Radio, LLC	August 28 2025 through August 29, 2025.	Channel 4 Low Power TV station, providing information to tennis match spectators at McLane Stadium.
W04ST-D	8/30/2025	Tallahassee, Florida	Live Sports Radio, LLC	August 30, 2025.	Channel 4 Low Power TV station, providing information to spectators at Doak Campbell Stadium.
W06ST-D	8/31/2025	Auburn, Alabama	Live Sports Radio, LLC	August 31, 2025 through February 28, 2026, and August 31, 2026 through February 28, 2027.	Channel 6 Low Power TV station, providing information to spectators at Jordan-Hare Stadium.
W04SZ-D	8/31/2025	Tuscaloosa, Alabama	Live Sports Radio, LLC	August 31, 2025 through February 28, 2026, and August 31, 2026 through February 28, 2027.	Channel 4 Low Power TV station, providing information to spectators at Bryant-Denny Stadium.
K03SS-D	9/2/2025	Las Vegas, Nevada	Live Sports Radio, LLC	September 2, 2025 through September 4, 2025.	Channel 3 Low Power TV station, providing information to spectators at Fontainebleau Las Vegas hotel.
K05SS-D	9/12/2025	Madison, Wisconsin	Live Sports Radio, LLC	September 12, 2025 through September 14, 2025.	Channel 5 Low Power TV station, providing information to spectators at Camp Randall Stadium.
K05ST-D	9/19/2025	Norman, Oklahoma	Live Sports Radio, LLC	September 19, 2025 through September 20, 2025.	Channel 5 Low Power TV station, providing information to spectators at Oklahoma Memorial Stadium.
W04ST-D	9/21/2025	Farmingdale, New York	Live Sports Radio, LLC	September 21, 2025 through September 28, 2025.	Channel 4 Low Power TV station, providing information to spectators at Bethpage Black Golf Course.
K05ST-D	12/17/2025	Minneapolis, Minnesota	Live Sports Radio, LLC	December 17, 2025 through December 25, 2025.	Channel 5 Low Power TV station, providing information to spectators at U.S. Bank Stadium.
W03ST-D	1/19/2026	Miami, Florida	Live Sports Radio, LLC	January 19, 2026, and May 2, 2026 through May 4, 2026.	Channel 3 Low Power TV station, providing information to spectators at Hard Rock Stadium
K03ST-D	1/24/2026	Seattle, Washington	Live Sports Radio, LLC	January 24, 2026 through January 28, 2026.	Channel 3 Low Power TV station, providing information to spectators at Seattle Convention Center-Summit Building.
K04ST-D	1/25/2026	Santa Clara, California	Live Sports Radio, LLC	January 25, 2026 through February 8, 2026.	Channel 4 Low Power TV station, providing information to Super Bowl spectators at Levi's Stadium.
K06ST-D	3/1/2026	Indian Wells, California	Live Sports Radio, LLC	March 1, 2026 through March 15, 2026.	Channel 6 Low Power TV station, providing information to spectators at Indian Wells Tennis Garden.
K03ST-D	3/5/2026	Phoenix, Arizona	Live Sports Radio, LLC	March 5, 2026 through March 7, 2026.	Channel 3 Low Power TV station, providing information to attendees at Phoenix Convention Center West Hall.
none assigned	4/16/2026	Las Vegas, Nevada	One Media Technologies, LLC	April 16, 2026 through April 23, 2026.	Channel 33 Low Power TV station (10 watts, ERP), providing indoor ATSC 3.0 demonstration at the National Association of Broadcasters convention in the Central Hall of the Las Vegas Convention Center.
W03ST-D	4/22/2026	Pittsburgh, Pennsylvania	Live Sports Radio, LLC	April 22, 2026 through April 25, 2026.	Channel 3 Low Power TV station, providing information to spectators at Acrisure Stadium.
W03SS-D	5/10/2026	Newton Square, Massachusetts	Live Sports Radio, LLC	May 10, 2026 through May 17, 2026.	Channel 3 Low Power TV station, providing information to spectators at Aronimink Golf Club.
W03ST-D	6/8/2026	Pittsburgh, Pennsylvania	Live Sports Radio, LLC	June 8, 2026 through June 12, 2026.	Channel 3 Low Power TV station, providing information to spectators at the David L. Lawrence Convention Center.
W03SS-D	6/14/2026	Southampton, New York	Live Sports Radio, LLC	June 14, 2026 through June 21, 2026.	Channel 3 Low Power TV station, providing information to spectators at the Shinnecock Hills Golf Club.
W03SS-D	6/29/2026	Columbus, Ohio	Live Sports Radio, LLC	June 29, 2026 through July 1, 2026.	Channel 3 Low Power TV station, providing information to spectators at Greater Columbus Convention Center.
W04SS-D	7/8/2026	Florham Park, New Jersey	Live Sports Radio, LLC	July 8, 2026 through July 15, 2026.	Channel 4 Low Power TV station, providing information to attendees at the Florham Park Sports Dome.
W03ST-D	7/11/2026	Philadelphia, Pennsylvania	Live Sports Radio, LLC	July 11, 2026 through July 14, 2026.	Channel 3 Low Power TV station, providing information to spectators at Citizens Bank Park.
K06ST-D	9/14/2026	Belvedere Tiburon, California	Live Sports Radio, LLC	September 14, 2026 through September 20, 2026.	Channel 6 Low Power TV station, providing information to spectators at the Challenger Tennis Tournament.
W04SS-D	10/2/2026	Starkville, Mississippi	Live Sports Radio, LLC	October 2, 2026 through November 14, 2026.	Channel 4 Low Power TV station, providing information to spectators at Davis Wade Stadium.
W04ST-D	10/2/2026	Knoxville, Tennessee	Live Sports Radio, LLC	October 2, 2026 through October 17, 2026.	Channel 4 Low Power TV station, providing information to spectators at Neyland Stadium.
W06SU-D	10/19/2026	Columbia, South Carolina	Live Sports Radio, LLC	October 19, 2026 through November 23, 2026.	Channel 6 Low Power TV station, providing information to spectators at Williams-Brice Stadium.
W03SZ-D	10/21/2026	Del Valle, Texas	Live Sports Radio, LLC	October 21, 2026 through October 25, 2026.	Channel 3 Low Power TV station, providing information to spectators at the F1 Circuit of America.
W04SS-D	10/30/2026	Oxford, Mississippi	Live Sports Radio, LLC	October 30, 2026 through October 31, 2026.	Channel 4 Low Power TV station, providing information to spectators at Vaught-Hemingway Stadium.
W03SK-D	11/13/2026	Nashville, Tennessee	Live Sports Radio, LLC	November 13, 2026 through November 14, 2026.	Channel 3 Low Power TV station, providing information to spectators at FirstBank Stadium.
K03SX-D	11/14/2026	Inglewood, California	Live Sports Radio, LLC	November 14, 2026 through February 15, 2027.	Channel 3 Low Power TV station, providing information to spectators at SoFi Stadium.
K03SQ-D	11/14/2026	Santa Monica, California	Live Sports Radio, LLC	November 14, 2026 through February 15, 2027.	Channel 3 Low Power TV station, providing information to spectators at the Barker Hangar.
