= Edna Ryan =

Edna Ryan may refer to:

- Edna Ryan (activist) (1904–1997), Australian feminist activist
- Edna Ryan (cricketer) (born 8 December 1946), New Zealand cricketer

== See also ==
- Edna Ryan Awards, also referred to as simply "The EDNAs", Australian awards named for activist Edna Ryan, from 1998 to 2023
- Agnes Edna Ryan (1878–1954), American pacifist, vegetarian, suffragist and managing editor of Woman's Journal, 1910–1917
