= Rambling with Gambling =

Long-running news radio program in New York

Rambling with Gambling was a news and talk radio program that aired in New York City from 1925 through 2016, almost uninterrupted, with one name change toward the end of its run. It was hosted by three generations of people named John Gambling throughout its entire 90+ year run.

The program was on WOR for most of its time on air. The show aired on WABC from 2000 to 2008, when it was renamed The John Gambling Show. On its return to WOR in 2008, it kept the newer name. The John Gambling Show also aired for three years on WNYM, from 2014 to 2016.

== History ==
John B. Gambling started the show in March 1925, when WOR was a promotional arm of the Bamberger's department store in Newark. His son, John A. Gambling became host in 1959. He brought his son, John R. Gambling, to the show as co-host in 1985.

John A. retired in 1991, leaving John R. as sole host until WOR cancelled the program in September 2000. At the time, it was the longest continually-running radio broadcast in America, a position now held by the Grand Ole Opry. After a brief hiatus, WABC hired Gambling. WOR owned the rights to the name Rambling with Gambling, so the revived show was renamed The John Gambling Show. In January 2008, WABC laid off Gambling in a cost-cutting measure.

On Wednesday, April 30, 2008, WOR and John R. Gambling announced the return of the show to its original station. They began broadcasting on Monday, May 5, 2008, from 6 AM to 10 AM. Despite the return to WOR, the new name continued.

Gambling retired at the end of 2013. From there, in an unannounced move, Gambling joined Salem Media's WNYM, where he hosted his program from March 2014 to September 2016. Gambling announced his intention to retire from broadcasting in September 2016, claiming that problems with his knees prevented him from continuing; with no sons named John to carry on the tradition, the show thus came to an end.

John R. Gambling's niece, Alexandra Janelli, a Philadelphia-based hypnotherapist and author, later interviewed him about the legacy of the show and the Gambling family in a podcast episode titled "Growing Up John Gambling."
