= Upton C. Ewing =

American sculptor and theologian

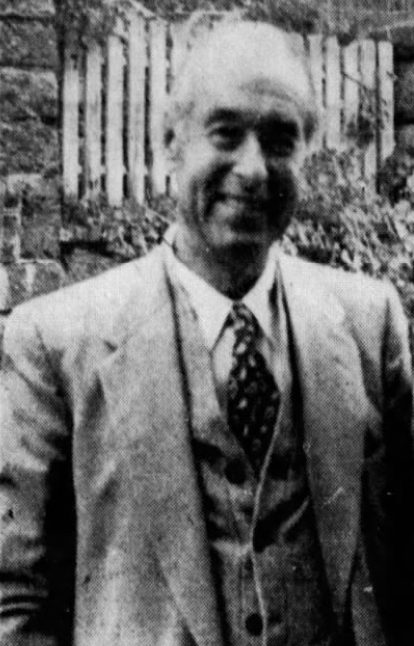
- Born: Upton Clary Ewing; 1894; Cincinnati
- Died: 30 October 1967 (aged 72); Coral Gables
- Occupation: Sculptor

Upton Clary Ewing (1894 – 30 October 1967) was an American sculptor, philosopher, theologian and writer.

== Career ==
Ewing was born in Cincinnati in 1894. He left school in the 5th grade and would go on to study painting professionally. In 1955, Ewing visited Albert Schweitzer in Alsace–Lorraine where he took pictures and measured the dimensions of his head. Upon his return to Coral Gables he sculptured a bronze bust of Schweitzer. Several casts from the original are displayed at Boston University. Ewing carved a statue of Bowman Foster Ashe, president of the University of Miami which was displayed in the Beaumont Lecture Hall on their main campus.

Ewing was an architect and designed All Souls Unitarian Church on Flagler Street. He co-founded the Library of Humane Literature with Herman Binder. He offered a pipe organ in his Ewing Gallery for the University of Miami recitals. He was a member of the American Institute of Architects and of the American Association for the Advancement of Science. As a philosopher, Ewing was a convinced believer in personal survival after death.

== Theology ==
Ewing was an ordained minister. He was influenced by Buddhism, Confucianism and the teachings of the Essenes. He opposed the slaughter of animals, slavery and war. He argued that eating animal flesh is a sin and that Paul the Apostle had perverted Christianity by condoning the consumption of animal flesh.

Ewing wrote about the Dead Sea Scrolls, pre-Christian origins of the New Testament and the Unknown years of Jesus. In his book The Essene Christ, Ewing argued that Jesus was an Essene and vegetarian. He spent five years doing historical research on early Christianity for the book. He argued that inconsistencies were inserted into the New Testament throughout centuries, obscuring the true moral character of Jesus. Ewing corrected what he believed were distortions in the Canonical gospels and reconstructed a Fifth Gospel in which all violence to animals was purged. For example, the Feeding of the 5,000 were fed with only bread and not fish. The book won the M. R. L. Freshel prize of $1000 for "its timely contribution to the ethical, the moral and the human education of mankind".

== Personal life ==
Ewing was a vegetarian and a life member of the Anti-Vivisection Investigation League. He banned meat from his household and predicted that his meatless diet would help him maintain a 120 year lifespan. He died from a heart attack on October 30, 1967 at his home in Coral Gables, aged 72. His wife Lois E. Ewing died in 1985. They had two adopted daughters.

== Selected publications ==
- Thresholds of Existence: A Cosmogony and Theory of Evolution As a Way of Life. Philosophical Library. 1956.
- The Essene Christ: A Recovery of the Historical Jesus and the Doctrines of Primitive Christianity. Philosophical Library. 1961.
- The Prophet of the Dead Sea Scrolls. Philosophical Library. 1963.
- The Martyred Jew: An Expository Treatise on the Life and the Death of the Historical Jesus. Library of Humane Literature. 1967.

== Quotes ==
A philosophy of compassion must include nonviolence in any form to any creature. We can't teach a philosophy of compassion unless we take it to the roots of the universe. Whatever man practices he becomes adept at, either for good or for bad. If he practices violence, whether to fellow man or other creatures, it leads to more violence. That is the history of wars. If he practices prejudice there is no limit to it and it leads to demagogues and violence.

— Upton C. Ewing, in 1962
