= Joe Pyne =

American television talk show host (1924–1970)

- Pyne in 1966
- Born: Joseph Edward Pyne; December 22, 1924; Chester, Pennsylvania, U.S.
- Died: March 23, 1970 (aged 45); Los Angeles, California, U.S.
- Occupations: Talk show host, actor
- Spouse(s): Ann Lewicki (before 1965) Britt Karin Larsen (m. 1965)
- Children: 3

Joe Pyne (Note: Some sources erroneously spell his surname "Pine" (see e.g. Perry (1989) or "Hot Talk" (1989))) (December 22, 1924 – March 23, 1970) was an American radio and television talk show host, who pioneered the confrontational style in which the host advocates a viewpoint and cultivates controversy by arguing with his guests and audience members. Pyne's brusque and abrasive performances were influential on later practitioners of the genre such as Rush Limbaugh, Morton Downey Jr., Bob Grant, and Michael Savage.

== Personal life ==
Joseph Pyne was born in Chester, Pennsylvania. His father, Edward Pyne, was a bricklayer; his mother, Catherine, was a housewife.

Pyne graduated from Chester High School in 1942 and immediately enlisted in the United States Marine Corps. He saw combat in the South Pacific, where he earned three battle stars. In 1943, during a Japanese bombing attack, he was wounded in the left knee; he earned a Purple Heart as a result of his injuries. In 1955, he lost the lower part of that leg due to a rare form of cancer.

In 1965, at age 40, Joe Pyne married 20-year-old Norwegian actress Britt Larsen in Las Vegas. After getting married, they went to a show where Frank Sinatra was performing. Reportedly, Sinatra recognized "the great Joe Pyne" in the audience and asked him to stand and take a bow.

== Career ==
=== Radio disk jockey ===
Discharged from the Marines at the end of World War II, Pyne attended a local drama school to correct a speech impediment. While studying there, he decided to try radio. He worked briefly in Lumberton, North Carolina, before he was hired at a new station, WPWA, in Brookhaven, Pennsylvania. After an argument with the owner he was fired. Next, he got a job at radio station WILM (AM) in Wilmington, Delaware, the first of three times he would work at that station. A few months later, in March 1948, he left WILM to work at WVCH, a newly opened station in Chester. Seeing little chance to advance his career in Chester, Pyne left after a year and a half. He moved to Kenosha, Wisconsin, where he was hired at WLIP. He quickly realized that he wanted more than playing music and reporting on community events like the county fair or a new business opening. Six months after starting at WLIP, he got into a heated confrontation with the station owner, William Lipman, and stormed out of the station afterwards. One of Pyne's cohosts later recounted the events of Pyne's fight with Lipman to Smithsonian Magazine, saying "Joe was yelling. He had one hand on our boss' lapel. He picked up a typewriter and threw it against the wall."

=== Talk show host ===
After leaving WLIP, Pyne moved to Atlantic City, New Jersey, where he took a job at WFPG as a disc jockey, and offered brief commentary to fill the silence while switching records. One evening, he made a comment about "corrupt politics in the town," which led to the station manager suggesting he change his broadcasting style — as he recalls, "the manager ran in and said 'Quit playing records and just talk.'" Pyne gradually developed his on-air persona as an opinionated host who knew something about everything.

Around 1950, (Note: Sources give conflicting reports on when this happened. Wilkinson (2012) says 1949, Press (2010) says 1950, and Halper (2008) says 1951.) he returned to WILM, where he officially debuted as a talk show host, although he would later tell reporters that he first experimented with two-way talk radio during his time in Kenosha. He called his new show It's Your Nickel, a popular idiomatic phrase referring to the fact that calls from a pay phone cost five cents. The format was Pyne expressing his opinions on various topics. Listeners would call to ask questions, offer their own opinions, or raise new topics. At first, Pyne didn't put callers on the air; he paraphrased for the audience what they had said. Soon the callers and his interaction with them became the heart of the show. Pyne became famous for arguing with or insulting those with whom he disagreed. One of his trademark insults was "go gargle with razor blades."

=== Television ===
In the late 1940s into the early 1950s, television began to usurp radio as America's main medium for news, leading Pyne to experiment with a television version of his radio program. In 1954, Pyne hosted The Joe Pyne Show on Wilmington's WDEL-TV, which was only moderately successful and ran for just a few months. In 1957, he stopped hosting It's Your Nickel and sought out television jobs in Hollywood, Los Angeles, but his search lasted over a month and "nobody even talked to [him]." He eventually found employment in Riverside hosting a radio show very similar in format to It's Your Nickel. After exposing a narcotics scandal at a local high school, his popularity exploded, and soon multiple TV stations were vying for his attention.

Pyne accepted an extremely lucrative offer — Smithsonian Magazine reports that he was paid $1,000 (equivalent to $11,463 in 2025) per week, a greater salary than most sports stars, including Mickey Mantle — from KTLA in Los Angeles to host a nightly television program. Just as he had at WILM, he would argue with and insult his guests on this show. A go-to insult of his was "I could make a monkey out of you, but why should I take the credit?". He considered this program to be a great success, saying in a 1959 interview, "I was in the big time, had my name in lights on Sunset Blvd." However, after roughly six months he resigned from the show and returned to Delaware due to a family member falling ill.

Back in Wilmington, Pyne hosted a daily radio talk show on WVUE and a weekly television companion piece on Friday nights from 11 p.m. to midnight, both of which also aired in nearby Philadelphia. The shows received positive reviews from critics, and Pyne told a reporter his TV show was the channel's most successful program, noting that it went from "an 0.3 to a 3.5 rating in 12 weeks."

In early 1959, Pyne worked briefly for Montreal radio station CKGM as a talk show host. Later that year, he returned to Los Angeles, and by 1960 he was hosting a radio show on KABC (AM), later transferring to KLAC and eventually KTTV.

In 1966, Pyne hosted the short-lived daytime game show Showdown on NBC. It was similar to other game and quiz shows of the era where teams competed to answer trivia questions, but its distinguishing feature was that when a contestant incorrectly answered a question, the chair they were sitting on would break and they'd fall to the floor. Showdown was cancelled after three months.

=== Syndication ===
In March 1966, the NBC Radio Network began syndicating The Joe Pyne Show, which connected Pyne to an audience nationwide. That July, Time reported that almost 100 stations in the L.A. metro area alone and more than 250 stations in total were broadcasting the daily radio program, and the weekly television show was syndicated in three major markets, with 21 additional television stations expected to begin syndication by September. Between his radio and television program, Pyne reportedly earned $200,000 (equivalent to $1,984,615 in 2025) annually or $4,000 (equivalent to $39,692 in 2025) per week, noted as being roughly twice as much as President Johnson's salary. (Note: One newspaper (see Darr (1966)) reported Pyne's annual salary as being $400,000 but no other sources can verify this number.)

== Controversies ==
Throughout his career as a talk show host, Pyne was consistently polarizing and controversial. His tendency toward insult and vitriol offended most critics, who called him "outrageous," "belligerent," and "self-righteous." A spokesman for KABC reportedly said that "Joe Pyne can make some people angry by merely commenting on the weather."

During Pyne's time in Wilmington, he was outspokenly critical of those he considered his political enemies, including Wilmington's mayor and Delaware's attorney general. Many listeners and guests threatened him with violence.

Pyne never shied away from having provocative guests on his program. He said that guests on his show should be "visceral" because "we want emotion, not mental involvement." He regularly had Nazis and Ku Klux Klan members on his show — drawing the ire of both the American Jewish Committee, who stated he was giving bigots a nationwide voice and helping spread their propaganda, and the FCC, who strongly recommended station managers more carefully vet Pyne's program — as well as other infamous individuals such as Anton LaVey, Sam Sloan, and followers of Charles Manson. Although he was frequently criticized for his choice of guests and "accused of fostering a hate program," he maintained that his show should be considered educational, since it exposed these groups and ideas to the public eye. He told a reporter, "I don't like tha [sic] apathy in America today [...] people should actually take an interest in what's going on [...] If [my shows] have made people think [...] then I think it was all worthwhile."

Pyne frequently invited hippies, homosexuals, and feminists onto his show, and would ridicule their looks and their lifestyles. Author Donna Halper posits that these guests were brought on the show just so that Pyne could argue with them and rile up his audience.

Pyne was vocal about his support of labor unions. According to Lou Rugani, Pyne's coworker at WLIP in Kenosha, Pyne would talk to listeners who called to request a particular song. One such caller wanted to argue with Pyne about unions. While talking to the caller, Pyne had the idea to place his phone receiver right next to the microphone so listeners could hear both sides of the argument, rather than only Pyne's half.

Pyne often campaigned against racial discrimination. During his tenure at WVUE, the local black press generally praised him for inviting black newsmakers on his show to discuss issues of concern to their community. One of his regular guests was a member of the editorial staff of the area's black newspaper, the Philadelphia Tribune, usually a columnist or the newspaper's publisher. Years later, he also had Maulana Karenga, a black author, political activist, and creator of Kwanzaa, as a guest on his syndicated show.

In 2021, the FBI released a slate of documents pertaining to Pyne under the Freedom of Information Act. The documents indicated that the FBI began monitoring Pyne in late 1961, and they were aware of allegations he was "anti-government." The FBI took a generally favorable view of Pyne, although on one occasion, the Los Angeles field office contacted him because of comments he had made on his show that led them to believe "he had access to confidential material in our files." The FBI received numerous letters from people concerned about the content of The Joe Pyne Show, often pertaining to a recent episode in which Pyne or a guest had made negative comments about government officials. In one such letter, addressed to FBI director J. Edgar Hoover and dated March 1965, the writer stated that Pyne had referred to Hoover as a "flat-foot cop" and made other comments perceived as denouncing the House Committee on Un-American Activities (HCUA), an opinion backed up by a 1962 FBI internal memo. The writer went on to state he believed Pyne was "advancing the Communist 'line.'"

=== Notable conflicts ===
Pyne was often verbally confrontational with his guests. If a discussion got too heated, the guest would often walk off or sometimes Pyne would himself throw the guest off the show with a parting comment like "take a hike" or "get lost." On occasion, conflicts would escalate and became physical. One guest threw a telephone at Pyne, and another punched his producer in the mouth. One especially noteworthy brawl, allegedly started by a guest, resulted in the audience charging the stage and knocking down the entire set.

In 1965, during the Watts Riots in Los Angeles, Pyne was interviewing a black militant on his TV show. At one point, Pyne opened his coat to reveal that he was carrying a handgun. His guest did likewise. The station suspended Pyne for one week as a result.

Few things were off limits on The Joe Pyne Show, and the unpredictability of never knowing what might happen next was a major perk for both viewers and guests alike. One of the only things considered taboo was talking about Pyne's wooden leg. For the most part, guests obeyed this unspoken rule, but there are unconfirmed rumors of two people who violated it. Paul Krassner, editor of The Realist, appeared on the show on July 16, 1967. According to Krassner, Pyne made insulting remarks about his acne scars. Krassner then asked Pyne if his wooden leg caused any difficulty in having sex with his wife. The audience supposedly gasped and the show's producers "averted their eyes" as "the atmosphere became surrealistic." A similar exchange allegedly occurred with Frank Zappa. Pyne is reported to have said something like ...I guess your long hair makes you a woman..., to which it is claimed that Zappa responded ...so I guess your wooden leg makes you a table... The stories about Zappa and Krassner have been oft-repeated in numerous online and print sources as a fact, but their authenticity is unknown. Although video clips of portions of Krassner's appearance on the show have been archived, none of them contain video of the incident. Krassner insists that it occurred, but was edited out of the broadcast.

== Death and legacy ==
Pyne was a life-long smoker and was rarely seen without a cigarette in his hand, even when on the air. In 1969, he noticed it was becoming increasingly hard to breathe, leading to his being diagnosed with lung cancer. He stopped his television show after it became too difficult to drive to the studio, but he set up a makeshift studio at home to continue the radio show for a few more months. Eventually, even that became impossible and he retired altogether in November 1969. He died in Los Angeles on March 23, 1970.

In the years following Pyne's death, many talk show hosts drew inspiration from him and sought to emulate his on-air persona of an angry host who belittles and jeers at guests. Harlan Ellison said "I’ve appeared on that sort of show all over the country. They call it controversy, but they’re all about vilification and hostility, and their model is Pyne." Some times, the heirs to Pyne's metaphorical throne directly cited him as an influence. For instance, Bob Grant worked with Pyne in Los Angeles in the early 1960s and considered him a mentor. He would fill-in for Pyne on occasion and took over the time slot in 1964 when Pyne departed for KLAC. Sean Hannity, in turn, took inspiration from, and gave praise to, Grant. Other times, various media outlets have drawn the connection. Rick Kogan, a reporter for the Chicago Tribune, believes that Morton Downey, Jr. formatted his own talk show after The Joe Pyne Show. The Los Angeles Times and Radio Only magazine have also made similar remarks. Likewise, Bill Press, author of the book Toxic Talk, characterized Pyne as "a precursor to [Rush] Limbaugh."

A lot of the footage from The Joe Pyne Show has since been lost, either because the videotape was destroyed or because another program was recorded over it, and much of what does exist is of poor quality. The organization Films Around the World owns a collection of over 100 episodes of The Joe Pyne Show and is working with videotape archival specialists to restore the reels of tape. In 2019, The Film Detective, an organization self-described as "a leading distributor of restored classic programming," published a press release stating they had obtained and restored six hours of footage from The Joe Pyne Show which would be available on their website starting in June of that year. However, their website is now defunct and the footage is no longer available.

Pyne was posthumously inducted into the Broadcast Pioneers Hall of Fame on November 16, 2012.
