= Jay Diamond =

American talk radio host

- Born: March 14, 1951 (age 75); United States
- Occupation: Radio personality

Jay Diamond is a former American talk radio host from the Manhattan Beach neighborhood of Brooklyn, New York City who began his move to the radio by being a frequent caller to other radio programs, especially New York City's popular Bob Grant's show.

Diamond broadcast for several years in the 1990s and early 2000s in New York City, first on WABC (then home to Bob Grant, who at the time considered Diamond a sort of protégé.) Having started in the left of center before moving to the right, by the mid-2000s he had moved back to the political left, on WEVD, and finally on WOR. His last scheduled broadcast was in Boston, Massachusetts, his Jay Diamond Show appearing on WRKO until 2005.

Diamond is a voice impressionist and has given short radio plays performed by "The Mighty Diamond Art Players," all of whom are himself. One of his famous impersonations was of Al Sharpton. Diamond also parodied the speaking style of other New York City politicians, such as then-Governor Mario Cuomo and former Mayor Ed Koch.

In 2009, Diamond wrote an opinion essay for the Buzzflash site, "Talk Radio is a Cancerous Blight on the Nation, Not 'Entertainment.'"

His last time hosting a radio program was in February 2013 when he and Frank Morano filled in on CRN Digital Talk Radio Networks.
