= How to Learn Any Language =

1991 book by Barry Farber

- Author: Barry Farber
- Language: English
- Genre: language learning
- Publication date: 1991
- Publication place: United States

How to Learn Any Language: Quickly, Easily, Inexpensively, Enjoyably and on Your Own is a book by Barry Farber, an American radio talk show host, author, commentator and language-learning enthusiast. In this work he detailed his method for self-study by employing a multi-track study of the language, using memory aids for vocabulary, and "hidden moments" throughout the day.
