= Agnes Ryan =

American pacifist, vegetarian, suffragist and managing editor

Agnes Edna Ryan
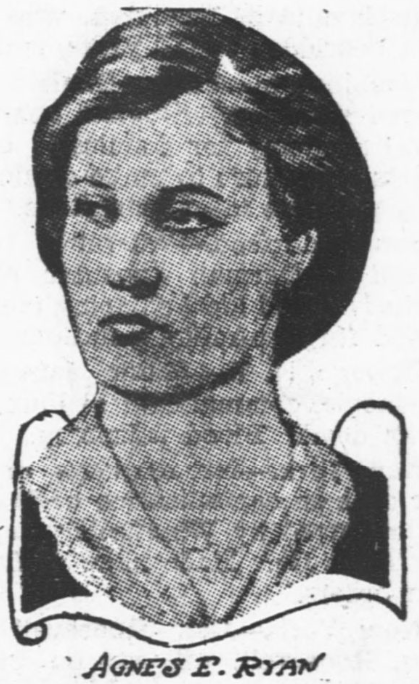
- Born: November 10, 1878
- Died: 1954
- Occupation(s): Activist, editor

Agnes Edna Ryan (November 10, 1878 – 1954) was an American pacifist, vegetarian, suffragist and managing editor of Woman's Journal, 1910-1917.

== Biography ==
Agnes Edna Ryan was born in Stuart, Iowa, to Edward and Mary A. Ryan. She had two siblings, John and Katherine Ryan.

Graduating from Boston University in 1903, Ryan went on to work for the Riverside Press in Cambridge, Massachusetts, and as a staff member of the Congregationalist and National magazines, as well as the Boston American. In 1910, she became managing editor of a suffrage publication, the Woman's Journal. In 1915, Agnes E. Ryan married Henry Bailey Stevens, who worked as the assistant editor for the Woman's Journal. In order to keep her last name, she went to court and successfully challenged the law that required women to take their husband's last name. The couple adopted two children, Peter and Patricia.

In 1917, Ryan and Stevens resigned from the Woman's Journal in part because of their opposition to World War I. In 1918, when Henry accepted a job in Durham, N.H., as the director of the Agricultural Experiment Station and Cooperative Extension Service at the New Hampshire College of Agriculture and the Mechanic Arts, later the University of New Hampshire, Agnes followed, organizing the New Hampshire Peace Union, writing poetry, becoming active in the MacDowell Colony of Peterborough, New Hampshire, and serving as a speaker for the Women's International League for Peace and Freedom.

Ryan was among the feminist vegetarians who, during World War I, made a connection between meat eating and the killing of human beings in the Great War. She was a member of the Millennium Guild.

In Ryan's unpublished novel, "Who Can Fear Too Many Stars?," she depicts vegetarianism as a way of resisting male dominance.

Ryan's papers are archived at the Arthur and Elizabeth Schlesinger Library on the History of Women in America, Radcliffe Institute for Advanced Study, Harvard University, and include unpublished novels, diaries, correspondences, an autobiography, and other writings.

== Reception ==
Carol J. Adams argues that Ryan's "the Cancer Bogy" was perhaps the first modern vegetarian health guide.

Josephine Donovan mentions that Ryan is one of the many first-wave feminists who advocated for animal rights.

== Selected publications ==
- The Torch Bearer. A Look Forward and Back at the Woman's Journal, the Organ of the Woman's Movement (1916)
- A Whisper of Fire (1919)
- For the Church Door (1943)
- A Ph.D. thesis, "Priestess of reform: The life of Agnes Ryan, 1878-1954," by Marcia Rollinson is housed at the University of New Hampshire.
