= Barry Farber =

American journalist (1930–2020)

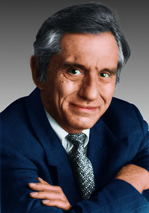
- Born: May 5, 1930; Baltimore, Maryland, US
- Died: May 6, 2020 (aged 90); New York City, US
- Occupations: Political commentator; journalist; author
- Children: 2

Barry Morton Farber (May 5, 1930 – May 6, 2020) was an American conservative radio talk show host, author, commentator and language-learning enthusiast. In 2002, industry publication Talkers Magazine ranked him the ninth greatest radio talk show host of all time. He also wrote articles appearing in The New York Times, Reader's Digest, The Washington Post, and the Saturday Review. He was the father of journalist Celia Farber and singer-songwriter Bibi Farber.

== Early life and language learning ==
Farber was born in Baltimore, Maryland, the son of Sophie (Marcus) and Raymond Farber, who both worked on the family's Jay-Ray Sportswear line. Farber was Jewish and grew up in Greensboro, North Carolina.

After nearly failing Latin in the ninth grade, that summer Farber started reading a Mandarin Chinese language-learning book. A trip to Miami Beach, Florida, to see his grandparents, coincidentally put him in the midst of a large number of Chinese navy sailors in training there. His Chinese rapidly improved.

Back in Greensboro, he took up Italian, Spanish, and French on his own before summer vacation was over. He started taking French and Spanish classes in his sophomore year and also learned Norwegian on his own while in high school. He graduated in 1948 from Greensboro Senior High School (see Grimsley High School).

He then attended the University of North Carolina, where he learned Russian. As a delegate from the National Student Association to what he later called a "Tito propaganda fiesta called the Zagreb Peace Conference", he found other Slavic languages were closely related to Russian. A 16-day boat trip back to the United States with Yugoslavs allowed him to practice his Serbo-Croatian. After covering the 1952 Summer Olympic Games in Helsinki, he learned Indonesian on another boat trip back to the U.S.

As a newspaper reporter in 1956, Farber was invited by the United States Air Force to cover the airlift of Hungarian refugees from the uprising in Hungary that year. In an Austrian border village, Farber later wrote, he so impressed a Norwegian man, Thorvald Stoltenberg, with knowledge of the man's native tongue that he was allowed to go on one of the covert missions smuggling Hungarians into Austria.

Farber had knowledge of more than 25 languages, including the ones mentioned above. He published a book titled How to Learn Any Language that detailed his method for self-study. It employed a multi-track study of the language, the use of memory aids for vocabulary, and the utilization of "hidden moments" throughout the day.

Farber preferred to say that he was a student of a certain number of languages, rather than saying that he spoke them. Of the languages he studied, half he "dates" and the other half he "marries". According to Farber: "By languages I date, I mean no grammar and no script, languages like Bengali."

Aside from Bengali, the 25 foreign languages he studied include these 19 ("marriage" or "dating" specified, when known): Danish, Dutch, Finnish, French, German, Hebrew, Hungarian, Indonesian, Italian, Mandarin, Norwegian, Portuguese, Russian, Serbo-Croatian, Spanish (marriage), Swedish and Yiddish, as well as Bulgarian and Korean. Barry could speak and read some Albanian, and was enthusiastic about expanding his vocabulary of the language.

Farber's book, How to Learn any Language, never specifies all of the 25 languages that his publicity materials say he studied. He said in the book that when he was inducted into the U.S. Army in 1952, he was "tested and qualified for work in fourteen different languages" and since learned more in some of those languages as well as the others. He mentioned in the 2005 interview that he still constantly learned bits and pieces of new language—some Albanian phrases or a new phrase each time he went into a grocery store where a Tibetan woman works.

== Radio career ==
His radio career began in New York City, working as the producer for the Tex and Jinx (Tex McCrary and Jinx Falkenburg) interview program. It was a live remote from Peacock Alley in the Waldorf Astoria Hotel, broadcast over 660 WNBC in the mid-1950s from 10:30 PM to midnight, Monday through Friday.

William Safire hired Farber as a producer. Farber eventually hosted his own show on 1010 WINS.

Begun in 1960, his first talk show was called Barry Farber’s WINS Open Mike. It was the only talk show on what was then a rock n’ roll station and was on weeknights at 11. He left that job for an evening talk show on WOR in 1962, and then became an all-night host in 1967.

In November 1977, Kaiser Broadcasting debuted a weekly talk show hosted by Farber as a replacement to its program hosted by Lou Gordon, who died earlier that year, but it was short-lived.

Farber then joined 570 WMCA for an afternoon drive time talk show, which lasted until 1989 when WMCA changed its format to Christian radio.

In 1990, he became a national talk-show host on the ABC Radio Network, which was trying to build a group of nationwide talk shows at the time. Lynn Samuels, a liberal, was forced to share her local 770 WABC show with Farber which led to on-air confrontations, and resulted in her departure from the station. ABC's project later was abandoned, and Farber, Michael Castello, and Alan Colmes got together and quickly formed their own independent network called Daynet. He eventually joined Talk Radio Network as a weekend and fill-in host until that network ceased operations in 2017.

Farber then moved to CRN Digital Talk Radio Networks, hosting a one-hour weekday show.

Early in the 1970s, Farber was an adjunct professor of journalism at St. John's University in New York. Often, his former students were heard calling his radio program with admiring words and memories.

On the radio, Farber became easily identifiable by his accent, delivery, and vocabulary. Sponsors were drawn to his ability to deliver a live commercial spot, often ad-libbed, and sound like he truly believed in the product.

In 1991 he was named "Talk Show Host of The Year" by the National Association of Radio Talk Show Hosts.

In 2008 Farber married Sara Pentz, a television news reporter and journalist.

Farber was inducted into the National Radio Hall of Fame in 2014.

== Political philosophy and career ==
In his youth, Farber fell in love with Norway, marrying Norwegian national Ulla Fahre. He embraced the Social Democracy popular in that Scandinavian nation. During the 1960s, his political commentary combined militant opposition to Soviet Communism with lavish praise for the achievements of Social Democracy, which he patriotically hoped America would one day adopt. But when the long-incumbent Swedish Social Democrats faced defeat at the polls, he began to re-examine his beliefs and would come to advocate the liberal economics popular among those called conservatives in America.

At one time a Democrat, in 1970 he ran for the U.S. House of Representatives in New York City's 19th district as the candidate of the Republican and Liberal parties, in a lively uphill race. His main opponent was Liberal Democrat Bella Abzug, the victor. In 1977, Farber left his talk-radio career for a time to run for Mayor of New York City as the candidate of the Conservative party, receiving almost as many votes as the Republican candidate, but vastly fewer than winner Democrat Ed Koch.

== Death ==
Farber, who vowed never to completely retire from broadcasting, remained active on his CRN show until the day before his death, appearing to celebrate his 90th birthday. The day after, on May 6, 2020, Farber died at his home. He had been in declining health following a series of falls.

== Books ==
- Making People Talk: You Can Turn Every Conversation into a Magic Moment (William Morrow & Co: 1987) ISBN 0-688-01591-3
- How to Learn Any Language: Quickly, Easily, Inexpensively, Enjoyably and on Your Own 172 pages, (Carol Publishing Corporation: 1991) ISBN 0-8065-1271-7 (paperback)
- How to Not Make the Same Mistake Once (Barricade Books: 1999) ISBN 1-56980-132-0
- Cocktails with Molotov: An Odyssey of Unlikely Detours (WND Books: 2012) ISBN 978-1-936488-51-3

Party political offices
Preceded by Mario Biaggi	Conservative Party nominee for Mayor of New York City; 1977	Succeeded by John Esposito
