= WAAT (AM) =

Temporary Jersey City, New Jersey radio broadcasting station, that was active in 1922

WAAT (833 AM) was a radio station located in Jersey City, New Jersey, which was active for much of 1922 under a temporary authorization.

== History ==
Information about WAAT is somewhat limited. The monthly issues of the Radio Service Bulletin regularly reported the status of stations operating under standard licenses. However, in general this publication did not include information about temporary stations like WAAT.

=== Amateur station 2IA ===
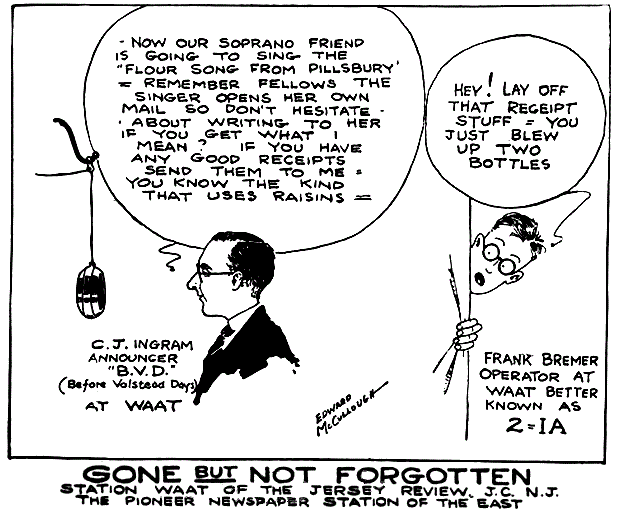
1923 cartoon referencing Frank Bremer's broadcasts over amateur station 2IA and temporary broadcasting station WAAT

Although WAAT was officially assigned to the Jersey Review newspaper, most of its operation was conducted by that paper's radio editor, Frank V. Bremer. Bremer had extensive experience as a radio operator and pioneering broadcaster, starting with his amateur station, 2IA, located at his home at 3613 Boulevard in Jersey City, New Jersey. As part of his activities he is said to have hired out 2IA to the Jersey Journal for a one-hour New Year's program that began at 11:30 p.m. on December 31, 1921, for which the newspaper reportedly paid him $50. Ten days later a second newspaper, the Jersey Review, teamed up with Bremer to present a regular schedule of twice-weekly programs over 2IA.

=== Broadcasting station WAAT ===
Initially, there were no formal standards in the United States for radio stations making transmissions intended for the general public, and numerous stations under various classifications made entertainment broadcasts. However, effective December 1, 1921, the Department of Commerce, regulators of radio at this time, adopted a regulation that formally created a broadcasting station category, and stations were now required to hold a Limited Commercial license authorizing operation on wavelengths of 360 meters (833 kHz) for "entertainment" broadcasts or 485 meters (619 kHz) for "market and weather reports".

To conform with the new requirements, the Jersey Review applied for and was issued a temporary broadcasting station authorization with the sequentially assigned call letters of WAAT, for operation on the 360-meter "entertainment" wavelength. The temporary authorization listed only two days of operation, April 16 and 19, 1922, with the station continuing to broadcast out of Bremer's home.

Most stations issued temporary authorizations provided programming for special events, and were active for only a few days. In contrast, WAAT subsequently maintained a two-programs-a-week schedule. Because there was the single wavelength, 360 meters, available for entertainment broadcasts, in congested areas like the New York City region the local stations were required to set up a timesharing schedule, and WAAT was the region's only temporary station to be assigned timeslots. The WAAT broadcasts lasted for 10 months, finally ending in October 1922.

Bremer returned to the broadcasting airwaves four years later, with a new station licensed on August 19, 1926, to the Bremer Broadcasting Corporation in Jersey City. It was initially assigned the call letters WKBD, however, the next month Bremer was permitted to reclaim the WAAT call sign used in 1922.
