= John B. Gambling =

John Bradley Gambling (April 9, 1897 – November 21, 1974) was an American radio personality. He was a member of the Gambling family, 3 generations of whom—John B., John A. and John R.—were hosts of WOR Radio's (New York City, 710 AM) morning show Rambling with Gambling (later known as The John Gambling Show) over the course of over 75 years (1925–2000 and 2008–2013).

== Early years ==
As an adolescent in Cambridge, England, Gambling studied horticulture, planning to make a career in that field. Later, he joined the merchant marine and "became chief operator on the big passenger ships."

== Radio ==
John B. was the host from 1925 to 1959, when he retired in favor of his son, John A. Gambling. With his Musical Clock, his all-in-fun setting-up exercises, cheerio music, wheezy gags, weather information and news scraps, John B. Gambling was a WOR fixture. Once he was a British seaman on a World War I mine sweeper.

John Gambling had a band, and provided live music, including the "March of the Seven Dwarfs," every morning at 7 am sharp.

Gambling bought a home in Teaneck, New Jersey in 1929.

== Family ==
Gambling's son John A. Gambling and grandson John R. Gambling continued the Rambling with Gambling tradition on WOR. Alexandra Janelli, a Philadelphia-based hypnotherapist and author, is a member of the Gambling family and hosted a podcast episode titled "Growing Up John Gambling" in which she interviewed John R. Gambling about the family legacy.
