= WOR (AM) =

Clear-channel AM radio station in New York City

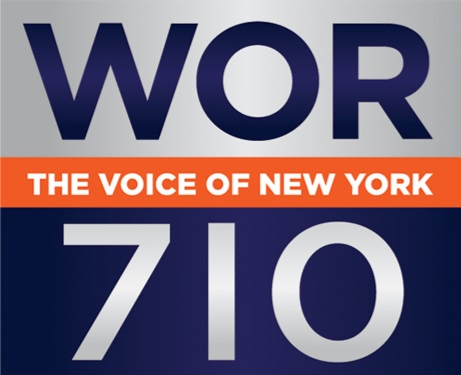
- New York, New York (Note: Originally licensed to Newark, New Jersey; moved to New York City in 1941.); United States
- Broadcast area: New York metropolitan area
- Frequency: 710 kHz
- Branding: 710 WOR

Programming
- Language: English
- Format: News/talk
- Affiliations: Compass Media Networks; NBC News Radio; Premiere Networks

Ownership
- Owner: iHeartMedia; (iHM Licenses, LLC)
- Sister stations: WAXQ; WHTZ; WKTU; WLTW; WWPR-FM; WWRL

History
- First air date: February 22, 1922
- Former frequencies: 833 kHz (1921–1922); 750 kHz (1922–1923); 740 kHz (1923–1927)
- Call sign meaning: randomly assigned, backronym "World of Radio"

Technical information
- Licensing authority: FCC
- Facility ID: 7710
- Class: A
- Power: 50,000 watts
- Transmitter coordinates: 40°47′50.36″N 74°5′22.51″W
- Repeater: 103.5 WKTU-HD2 (Lake Success)

Links
- Public license information: Public file; LMS
- Webcast: Listen live (via iHeartRadio)
- Website: 710wor.iheart.com

WOR (710 kHz) is a 50,000-watt class A clear-channel AM radio station owned by iHeartMedia and licensed to New York, New York. The station airs a mix of local and syndicated talk radio shows, primarily from co-owned Premiere Networks, including The Clay Travis and Buck Sexton Show, The Sean Hannity Show, and Coast to Coast AM with George Noory. Since 2016, the station serves as the flagship station for co-owned NBC News Radio. The station's studios are located at 125 West 55th Street in Midtown Manhattan, with its transmitter in Rutherford, New Jersey. WOR began broadcasting on Wednesday, February 22, 1922, and is one of the oldest continuously operating radio stations in the United States with a three–letter call sign, characteristic of a station dating from the 1920s. WOR is the only New York City station to have retained its original three-letter call sign, making those the oldest continuously used call letters in the New York City area.

== History ==
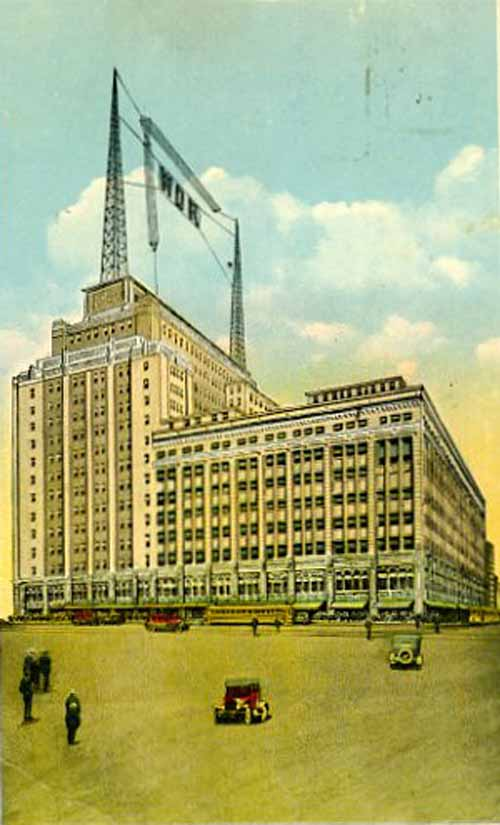
With studio on the 6th floor and showy antenna on the roof on its Newark store, Bamberger's launched WOR to sell more radios.

=== Bamberger's Department Store ===
WOR's original owner was Bamberger's Department Store in Newark, New Jersey. In the early 1920s the store was selling radio receivers and wanted to put a radio station on the air to help promote receiver sales, as well as for general publicity. Effective December 1, 1921, the U.S. Department of Commerce set aside a single wavelength, 360 meters (833 kilohertz), for radio stations to broadcast "entertainment" programs. The store applied for a license which was granted on February 20, 1922, with the randomly assigned call sign of WOR. The station's original city of license was Newark.

The station made its debut broadcast on February 22, 1922, from a studio located on an upper floor of the store. A 250-watt De Forest transmitter was constructed on the roof of the department store. The station's first broadcast was made with a homemade microphone constructed by attaching a megaphone to a telephone mouthpiece. Al Jolson's "April Showers" was the first record played on WOR.

=== 750 to 710 kHz ===
Three other broadcasting stations were already on the air in the region transmitting on 360 meters: WJZ, also in Newark, operated by the Radio Corporation of America (RCA); WNO, operated by The Jersey Journal newspaper in Jersey City; and WDT, owned by the Ship Owners Radio Service in the Stapleton section of Staten Island. The use of the common wavelength required a time-sharing agreement between the stations designating transmitting hours. This soon became complicated, for by June a total of ten regional stations were using 360 meters. This restricted the number of hours available to WOR, which was now limited to just a few hours per week.

In September 1922 the Department of Commerce set aside a second entertainment wavelength, 400 meters (750 kHz), for "Class B" stations that had quality equipment and programming. In the New York City region, WOR, along with two New York City American Telephone & Telegraph Company (AT&T) stations, WBAY and WEAF (now WFAN), were assigned to this new wavelength. Additional "Class B" broadcasting frequencies were announced in May 1923, including three for the Newark/New York City area.

WOR moved to 740 kHz, where it shared time with WDT (which shut down by the end of the year) and a new RCA station, WJY. WJY rarely used the time periods assigned to it, and by the summer of 1926, WOR began operating full-time, stating that the silent WJY was considered to have forfeited its hours. In June 1927, the Federal Radio Commission (FRC) moved WOR to 710 kHz, which it has occupied ever since. On November 11, 1928, under the provisions of the FRC's General Order 40, this assignment was designated a "clear channel" frequency, with WOR the dominant station.

=== Manhattan studios and Mutual Broadcasting ===
In December 1924, although still licensed to Newark, WOR opened a second studio in Manhattan to originate programs, so that stars of the day based in New York City would have better access to the station. Later in 1926, WOR left its original New York City studio on the 9th floor of Chickering Hall at 27 West 57th Street. It relocated to 1440 Broadway, two blocks from Times Square.

WOR was a charter member of the CBS Radio Network (CBS), acting as the flagship of the 16 stations that aired the first Columbia Broadcasting System network program on September 18, 1927.

In 1934, WOR in partnership with Chicago radio station WGN, and Cincinnati radio station WLW, formed the Mutual Broadcasting System and became its New York City flagship station. Mutual was one of the "Big Four" national radio networks in the United States during the 1930s–1980s.

In 1941, the station changed its city of license from Newark to New York City.

In 1957, WOR ended its relationship with Mutual and became an independent station. However, the station continued to carry Mutual's "Top of the News" with Fulton Lewis for 15 minutes each evening, Monday–Friday at 7:00 p.m. for several more years.

On April 30, 2005, WOR moved from its offices and studios at 1440 Broadway in Midtown Manhattan, where it had been based for 79 years. It relocated to a new facility at 111 Broadway near Wall Street in the Financial District.

After the station was acquired by Clear Channel Communications in 2012, it moved to its current location at Clear Channel's studios on Avenue of The Americas in Tribeca.

=== FM and TV stations ===
In 1941, WOR put an FM radio station, W71NY, on the air. WOR had been experimenting with FM broadcasts as W2XWI from its Carteret, New Jersey, transmitter site from 1938. For most of its first two decades, W71NY, later WOR-FM, largely simulcast the same programming as WOR. In 1949, WOR signed on a sister television station, Channel 9 WOR-TV. It started as an independent station, showing mostly movies and reruns of network shows, with some local children's and talk programs.

In 1952, WOR-AM-FM-TV were sold to RKO General. The TV station later became WWOR-TV, relocated to Secaucus, New Jersey, after it and the radio stations, 710 WOR and 98.7 WOR-FM, were sold to separate companies in 1987 (due to an FCC regulation in effect then that forbade TV and radio stations with different owners from sharing the same call letters). WOR-FM today is WEPN-FM.

=== Full service radio to talk ===
From the 1930s to the early 1980s, WOR was described as a full service radio station, featuring a mix of music, talk and news. There was an emphasis on news reports and talk programs, but music was played as well, usually a blend of pop standards and adult contemporary tunes, often described as middle of the road music (MOR). WOR played several songs per hour weekday mornings from 6 am to 9 am, and again afternoons from 3 pm to 6 pm. WOR also featured music on Saturday and Sunday afternoons.

In ratings reports, WOR was classified as an "MOR/Talk" station until 1984. From 1983 to about 1985, WOR gradually eliminated music altogether, evolving into its current talk format.

=== Noted hosts ===
Past notable hosts include Ed and Pegeen Fitzgerald, Arlene Francis, Long John Nebel, Peter Lind Hayes and Mary Healy, Bernard Meltzer, Barry Farber, Jean Shepherd, Bob and Ray, Bob Grant and Gene Klavan. From April 15, 1945, to March 21, 1963, newspaper columnist Dorothy Kilgallen and her husband Dick Kollmar co-hosted a late morning show on WOR called Breakfast With Dorothy and Dick.

WOR's morning show Rambling with Gambling aired every weekday morning on the station, from March 1925 to September 2000, across three generations of hosts: John B. Gambling, his son John A. Gambling, and his grandson John R. Gambling. After John R. Gambling's edition of the show was dropped, he moved to 770 WABC, where he hosted a late-morning show until January 2008. He returned to WOR mornings in May 2008. Although never aimed at young listeners, WOR was this group's radio station of record in the New York metropolitan area during bad winter weather. Students of all ages dialed up 710 AM on their radios as the Gamblings dutifully announced a comprehensive list of school closings for New York, New Jersey, and Connecticut, in strict alphabetical order. John R. Gambling later hosted middays on 970 WNYM for several years, after retiring from WOR in December 2013.

=== News department ===
For many years the station aired detailed, 15-minute news reports on the hour. Newscasters Henry Gladstone, Harry Hennessey, Jack Allen, John Wingate, Lyle Vann, Peter Roberts, Ed Walsh, Shelly Strickler, Sam Hall and Roger Skibenes were some of the on-air members of the news department. WOR introduced live, on-air, helicopter traffic reports with pilot-reporters "Fearless" Fred Feldman and George Meade. On January 10, 1969, fill-in pilot/reporter Frank McDermott died when the WOR helicopter crashed into an apartment building in Astoria, Queens as he was broadcasting a traffic update. The building caught fire and McDermott's body was found nearby.

Beginning in October 2011, WOR extended its partnership with NBC News beyond hourly national news updates to include live simulcasts of NBC Nightly News and Meet the Press.

=== New Jersey transmitters ===
Beginning in 1935, WOR's transmitter was in Carteret, New Jersey. The site used two steel lattice towers and a steel cable as a third radiating element. The cable hung from a catenary connected to the top of each of the towers. This created a lopsided figure-8 pattern intended to cover both the New York City and Philadelphia markets, making WOR the first 50,000 watt directional station in the U.S. Over the years, construction affected WOR's signal strength and WOR sought a new location. On September 1, 1966, the Federal Communications Commission (FCC) issued a construction permit for a new location in Lyndhurst, New Jersey. That location features three full half-wave (692 feet) guyed antennas in a triangular array. WOR was within one mile of both AM 1190 WLIB and AM 1010 WINS. Thus each WOR tower hosted AM detuning apparatus to prevent adverse distortion of WINS and WLIB radiation patterns. Built on hydraulic landfill, the site provides excellent ground conductivity for daytime groundwave radiation.

At night when conditions are favorable, WOR could be picked up, using very sensitive radio receivers, in parts of Europe and Africa. It shares class A status on 710 kHz with KIRO in Seattle. WOR and KIRO must protect each other against interference by using directional antennas. On September 8, 2006, WOR moved its transmitter a short distance to Rutherford, New Jersey, near the Western Spur of the New Jersey Turnpike.

=== Clear Channel Communications ===
On August 13, 2012, it was announced that WOR was to be purchased by Clear Channel Communications (now iHeartMedia), pending FCC approval. A local marketing agreement began on August 15. On December 20, the day Clear Channel officially took ownership of the station, The Dr. Joy Browne Show, The Gov. David Paterson Show, and The Mike Huckabee Show were removed from the WOR program schedule.

=== Adding new shows ===
WOR's previous logo used until December 2013

On January 2, 2013, WOR added former WABC weekend host Mark Simone to its weekday morning line up. WOR offers ten hours of live and local programming on weekdays, with syndicated programs heard the rest of the day. Weekends feature mostly paid brokered programming on health, money, real estate and other topics.

In late 2014, after WOR cancelled the hot talk Elliot in the Morning show, simulcast from iHeart alternative rock station WWDC in Washington, D.C., former WNBC sportscaster Len Berman and Tampa Bay area radio host Todd Schnitt were hired as the station's morning hosts. Schnitt left WOR in October 2017, while Berman continued with guest co-hosts in the 6 am–10 am slot. A new co-host, NY Post Broadway columnist, Michael Riedel, was added in 2018. Riedel had been a regular contributor to the "Imus In the Morning" show.

On January 1, 2014, both the Rush Limbaugh and Sean Hannity shows were transferred from rival talk radio station WABC, owned by Cumulus Media. Since Premiere Networks, owned by iHeartMedia, syndicates both shows, the shows were brought in-house to WOR to boost the station's ratings and retain revenue. Limbaugh died in February 2021, and the show was succeeded by the Clay Travis and Buck Sexton Show in June 2021.

=== Mets baseball ===
On November 4, 2013, WOR and the New York Mets announced the team's games would be broadcast on 710 AM, as well as advertised on all local Clear Channel radio stations, beginning with the 2014 baseball season. To act as a lead-in to the Mets, sportscaster Pete McCarthy was given an early evening show called "The Sports Zone".

The relationship with the Mets lasted through the 2018 season, after which the team announced a new seven-year agreement with Entercom to air games on WCBS 880. McCarthy's show was also discontinued.

== WOR Radio Network ==
WOR was once the flagship station of the now-defunct WOR Radio Network. The network distributed nationally syndicated programming, all from the WOR studios at 111 Broadway in New York. Following the sale of WOR to Clear Channel Communications, what was left of the WOR Radio Network was folded into Premiere Networks, Clear Channel's syndication wing.

== Past WOR personalities ==
Past notable WOR program hosts and newscasters included these personalities.

- Lou Adler
- Glenn Beck
- Dr. Joy Browne
- Gene Burns
- Jerome Alan Danzig
- Uncle Don Carney
- Don Criqui
- Jay Diamond
- Rocco DiSpirito
- Lou Dobbs
- Jerry Doyle
- Warren Eckstein
- Bob Elliott and Ray Goulding (Bob and Ray)
- Jinx Falkenburg and Tex McCrary (Tex and Jinx)
- Barry Farber
- Pegeen Fitzgerald
- Arlene Francis
- Joe Franklin
- Carlton Fredericks
- Arthur Frommer
- Mike Gallagher
- John A. Gambling
- John B. Gambling
- John R. Gambling
- Henry Gladstone
- Lisa Glasberg (Lisa G)
- Bob Grant
- Barry Gray
- Peter Lind Hayes and Mary Healy
- Donna Hanover
- Ellis Henican
- Gene Klavan
- Walter Kiernan
- Dorothy Kilgallen and Richard Kollmar (Dorothy and Dick)
- Lionel
- Jim Lounsbury
- Mary Margaret McBride
- Bernarr Macfadden
- Steve Malzberg
- Bernard Meltzer
- Dennis Miller
- Long John Nebel
- Bill O'Reilly
- David Paterson
- James Randi
- Joey Reynolds
- Joan Rivers
- Thurman Ruth
- Michael Savage
- Jay Severin
- Jean Shepherd
- Michael Smerconish
- Michael Strange
- Orson Welles

== See also ==
- James C. Thibodeaux
- List of initial AM-band station grants in the United States
- List of three-letter broadcast call signs in the United States

== Notes and references ==
Preceded by: 860 WABC; 1939–1940	Radio Home of the; New York Yankees; 1942	Succeeded by: 1010 WINS; 1944–1957

Preceded by: WFAN; 1987–2013	Radio Home of the; New York Mets; 2014-2018	Succeeded by: 880 WCBS; 2019–
