= John R. Gambling =

American radio personality (born 1950)

John Raymond Gambling (born April 8, 1950) is an American radio personality. He is the son of John A. Gambling and the grandson of John B. Gambling, and as such is the third-generation host of The Gambling family's very-long-running New York morning radio show. Through most of its run the show has been titled Rambling with Gambling, iterations from 2008 to 2016 were instead branded as The John Gambling Show.

== Career ==
Gambling joined his father as co-host of Rambling with Gambling in 1985, and took over as sole host in 1991 after his father's retirement. When WOR ended Rambling with Gambling in 2000 after 75 years on the air, John R. Gambling moved up the dial to WABC, taking over the post-morning-drive 10–noon slot. Gambling was fired by WABC on February 29, 2008 in a cost-cutting move.

On April 30, 2008, WOR announced the return of John R. Gambling to its air waves in his old morning-drive timeslot starting May 5, 2008. New York Mayor Michael Bloomberg also moved to WOR, joining Gambling on a one-hour segment, Fridays from 8–9 a.m. To make room for Gambling, former Mayor Rudolph Giuliani's ex-wife Donna Hanover left the station. Politically, Gambling describes himself as a "moderate conservative"; as such, he differs from the orthodox movement conservatism of most of his former colleagues on WABC.

Michael Bloomberg, the mayor of New York City appeared on Gambling's program each Friday from 8–9 a.m. discussing current issues in the city. After Gambling was terminated, Bloomberg called him "a class act". Bloomberg declined to continue to appear on WABC with Curtis Sliwa who took over the time slot, and opted instead to rejoin Gambling on WOR. (As it happens, the financial services company founded by Bloomberg is owner of a different New York station, WBBR, but he has stayed off his own station's airwaves all during his administration in order to avoid the appearance of a conflict of interest.)

On December 20, 2013, John R. Gambling did his last morning show on WOR after announcing his retirement from broadcasting (Gambling was effectively forced out as iHeartMedia purchased the station, and was replaced by the duo of Todd Schnitt and Len Berman). Gambling emerged as a host on AM 970 WNYM from 2014 to 2016. While at AM 970 WNYM, his show was produced by Frank Morano he decided to permanently retire from broadcasting, citing chronic knee problems resulting from an accident. With this, because he also had no sons named John to continue a show, the 91-year run of Rambling with Gambling came to an end.

== Family ==
Alexandra Janelli, a Philadelphia-based hypnotherapist and author, is Gambling's niece. She hosted a podcast episode titled "Growing Up John Gambling" in which she interviewed him about the family legacy and the history of Rambling with Gambling.
