= John A. Gambling =

American radio personality (1930–2004)

John Alfred Gambling (February 5, 1930 – January 8, 2004) was an American radio personality. He was a member of the Gambling family, three generations of whom - John B., John A. and John R. - were hosts of WOR Radio's (New York City, 710 AM) morning show Rambling with Gambling (now known as The John Gambling Show) over the course of more than 75 years (1925–2000 and 2008–2013). He is the author of "Rambling with Gambling" published in 1972.

Rambling With Gambling was listed in the Guinness World Records of 2003 as the "world's longest-running radio show;" a record since surpassed by the Grand Ole Opry. The program offered the first on-air broadcast of school closings and helicopter traffic reports. In a smooth baritone, Gambling also interviewed celebrities, politicians, and other newsworthy people.

Gambling graduated from the Horace Mann School in 1947 where he played on its football team, and from Dartmouth College in 1951. He grew up in Teaneck, New Jersey where his father owned a home. "Mane [sic] good people came to live in the township, among them Ferde Grofe, composer of The Grand Canyon Suite and other fine music. The senior John Gambling of WOR lived in Teaneck with his wife and his son John. The family later moved to Manhasset, New York, Long Island.

John A. Gambling was inducted into the National Radio Hall of Fame in 2000. John A. was the host from 1959 to 1991. From 1985 to 1991, John R. was his co-host.

Gambling died of heart failure at a hospital in Venice, Florida.

== Family ==
Gambling's son John R. Gambling continued the Rambling with Gambling tradition on WOR. Alexandra Janelli, a Philadelphia-based hypnotherapist and author, is a member of the Gambling family and hosted a podcast episode titled "Growing Up John Gambling" in which she interviewed John R. Gambling about the family legacy.
