= WNYM =

Conservative talk radio station in Hackensack, New Jersey

- Hackensack, New Jersey; United States
- Broadcast area: New York metropolitan area
- Frequency: 970 kHz
- Branding: AM 970, The Answer

Programming
- Language: English
- Format: Conservative talk radio
- Affiliations: Salem Radio Network; Townhall

Ownership
- Owner: Salem Media Group; (Salem Media of New York, LLC)
- Sister stations: WMCA

History
- First air date: August 1926
- Former call signs: WKBD (1926); WAAT (1926–1958); WNTA (1958–1962); WJRZ (1962–1971); WWDJ (1971–2008); WTTT (2008)
- Call sign meaning: "New York Metro"

Technical information
- Licensing authority: FCC
- Facility ID: 58635
- Class: B
- Power: 50,000 watts (day); 5,000 watts (night)
- Transmitter coordinates: 40°54′40.36″N 74°1′40.5″W

Links
- Public license information: Public file; LMS
- Webcast: Listen live (via Audacy)
- Website: am970theanswer.com

WNYM (970 AM) – branded "AM 970 The Answer" – is a commercial radio station licensed to Hackensack, New Jersey, and serving the New York metropolitan area. The station is owned by Salem Media Group and programs a conservative talk radio format. Its studios are shared with co-owned WMCA (570 AM) on Broadway in Lower Manhattan.

By day, WNYM transmits with 50,000 watts, the maximum for U.S. AM stations; at night, to avoid interference to other stations, WNYM reduces power to 5,000 watts. It uses a directional antenna with a three-tower array. Its transmitter is on Commerce Way in Hackensack, near New Jersey Route 4 and the Hackensack River.

== Programming ==
WNYM airs a mix of local and nationally syndicated conservative talk shows. Former Saturday Night Live cast member Joe Piscopo hosts WNYM's local morning drive time show. In afternoons, John Catsimatidis and Rita Cosby are heard, with Kevin McCullough on for an hour each evening. The rest of the weekday schedule is from the Salem Radio Network: Mike Gallagher, Hugh Hewitt, Charlie Kirk, Chris Stigall, Larry Elder and Eric Metaxas.

The station is the New York City-area network affiliate for Syracuse University football and men's basketball broadcasts, produced by Learfield.

In the past, WNYM also carried New York Islanders broadcasts, produced by Hofstra University-owned WRHU in Hempstead, New York. WNYM was formerly the flagship station of Seton Hall University men's basketball, and shared coverage of St. John's University men's basketball with 570 WMCA; both teams have since moved their radio broadcasts to streaming. WNYM has also aired ESPN Radio-produced NFL football and MLB baseball games that, due to programming conflicts, could not be broadcast on the local ESPN stations, WEPN 1050 AM and WEPN-FM 98.7.

== History ==
=== Early years ===
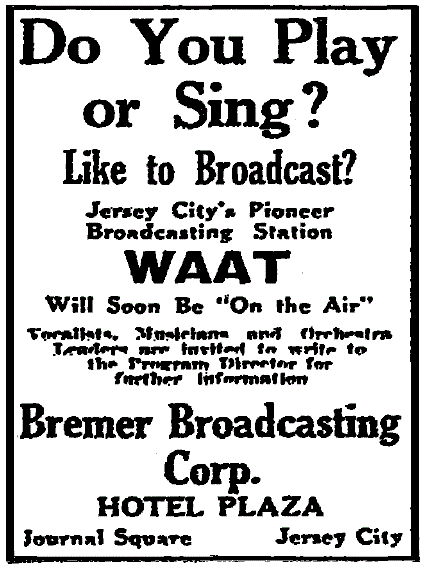
In November 1926 WAAT introduced broadcasts originating from the Hotel Plaza in Jersey City.

The station was first licensed on August 19, 1926, to the Bremer Broadcasting Corporation in Jersey City, headed by Frank V. Bremer. It was initially assigned the sequentially issued call letters WKBD. WKBD began a series of test transmissions in late August, at first broadcasting from Bremer's store at 210 Jackson Avenue. The next month Bremer was permitted to reclaim the call sign, WAAT, that had been assigned to a station he operated in 1922 under a temporary authorization. (Although FCC records list WNYM's "date first licensed" as August 1926, some station histories cite 1922 as its establishment date.)

WAAT's initial slogan was "The Voice At the Gate of the Golden State". A formal debut broadcast from studios at the Hotel Plaza in Jersey City was held on November 20, 1926. The station began operations during a chaotic period when most government regulation had been suspended, with new stations free to be set up with few restrictions, including choosing their own transmitting frequencies. Bremer initially squeezed WAAT onto the crowded New York area AM band using a non-standard frequency of 1275 kHz. Following the reestablishment of government control by the formation of the Federal Radio Commission (FRC), the new regulators issued a series of temporary authorizations beginning on May 3, 1927, with WAAT moved to a more traditional frequency of 1270 kHz, which a month later was changed to 1220 kHz. Stations were informed that if they wanted to continue operating, they needed to file a formal license application by January 15, 1928, as the first step in determining whether they met the new "public interest, convenience, or necessity" standard. On May 25, 1928, the FRC issued General Order 32, which notified 164 stations, including WAAT, that "From an examination of your application for future license it does not find that public interest, convenience, or necessity would be served by granting it." However, the station successfully convinced the commission that it should remain licensed.

In November 1928, with the implementation of the FRC's General Order 40, the station moved to 1070 kHz, which was followed by a switch to 940 kHz in April 1930. Effective March 1941, under the provisions of the North American Regional Broadcasting Agreement, stations on 940 kHz were reassigned to 970 kHz, which has been the station's frequency ever since. In 1943, WAAT's main studio location was changed from Jersey City to Newark, New Jersey in the Hotel Douglas, later moving to the Mosque Theatre at 1020 Broad Street.

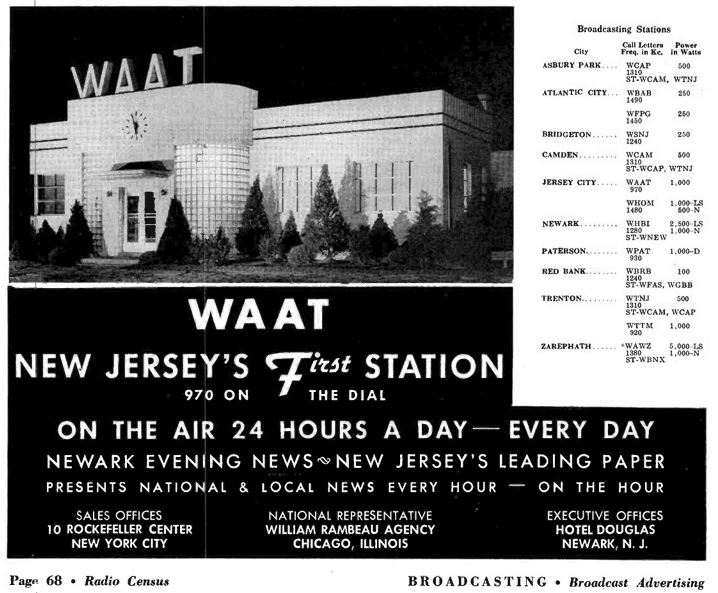
1942 station advertisement.

In 1947, Bremer launched an FM station, WAAT-FM (94.7, now WXBK), and the following year a sister television station, WATV, broadcasting on channel 13. In 1951 the stations were sold to Irving Rosenhaus. WAAT evolved to a middle of the road music format by the 1950s, similar to what WNEW, WOR, and WCBS were doing at that time.

In 1957, the WAAT/WATV operation was sold by Bremer to National Telefilm Associates, which changed the station's call letters to WNTA. National Telefilm split up its holdings in 1961, with WNTA-TV (now WNET) being sold to a New York City-based nonprofit educational group, and the WNTA radio stations going to Communications Industries Broadcasting. The new owners changed the call sign to WJRZ. The MOR format continued until September 15, 1965, when WJRZ became the first radio station in the New York metro area to play a country music format around the clock. It was also the flagship radio outlet for the New York Mets from 1967 until 1971.

In 1968, the station established a new transmitter site in Hackensack, New Jersey, and changed its community of license from Newark to Hackensack. A serious fire destroyed its studios located in a house on Hackensack Avenue in North Hackensack on October 17, 1970. The station operated out of a prefab building near the transmitter site for a period of time afterward.

=== Top 40 years ===
The station was put up for sale in the fall of 1970. Around that time, future sister station WMCA dropped top 40 for a talk format, leaving WABC as the only Top 40 radio station on the AM dial.

WJRZ was sold to Pacific and Southern Broadcasting (which merged with Combined Communications in 1974) on January 6, 1971. The call letters were changed on May 16 of that year to WWDJ (known on the air as "97-DJ"), and the station attempted to take on WABC and replace WMCA as the New York market's second Top 40 outlet. For a brief time, program director Mark Driscoll began imaging the station as "9-J", giving rise to a recorded parody of the station called "Nine" produced by a group that included disk jockeys Howard Hoffman, Randy West, Pete Salant and Russ "Famous Amos" DiBello.

The station was hampered by a directional signal that covered Manhattan and Northern New Jersey but suffered in the rest of the Five Boroughs and was virtually nonexistent on Long Island and western New Jersey. Eventually, FM competition from WCBS-FM and adult top 40 station WXLO (now WEPN-FM), and an evolution to adult Top 40 by WNBC (now WFAN), began to eat into WWDJ's ratings. In November 1973 it was ranked 15th in the Arbitron ratings.

=== Becoming a religious station (1974 - 1976) ===
By 1974, the station was losing money and unable to sell enough advertising. The studios were moved to the transmitter site. In the fall of 1973, the station began selling airtime to religious groups on weekends, which brought much-needed revenue for the station as it continued with Top 40 during weekdays into 1974. But as a result of the religious hours making money, WWDJ abruptly dropped the top 40 format on April 1, 1974, and switched to a Christian radio format full time. Because the change took place on April Fool's Day, many listeners thought the switch was some sort of joke.

Initially, WWDJ sold two-thirds of its daily airtime to outside ministries and played traditional Christian music the rest of the time, with the exception of a few hours on Saturdays devoted to a then-new genre, contemporary Christian music. WWDJ was sold to Communicom Corporation of America in April 1978, about a year before Combined Communications' merger into the Gannett Company in 1979.

=== CCM years ===
By late 1976, the music during the week was a mix of traditional and soft contemporary. As of 1979, the music was adult contemporary Christian and evolved to contemporary Christian by 1982.

The station still only played music part-time on weekdays and Saturdays. WWDJ continued with its mix of Contemporary Christian Music along with Christian talk and teaching throughout the 1980s and into the 1990s. Frank Reed, a former DJ with WNBC 660, hosted mornings.

=== Salem ownership ===
In 1994, WWDJ was sold to Salem Communications. In the New York radio market, Salem already owned WMCA since 1989. Initially Salem retained WWDJ's studios on Main Street in Hackensack. As WMCA ran Christian talk and teaching programming, it was thought that WWDJ would move to Christian music full-time weekdays with specialty Christian programming on weekends. While this did not happen, WWDJ by the end of 1994 was playing music.

In the fall of 1995, the station abruptly changed formats. The station's teaching programming expanded, with music cut back to morning and afternoon drive time hours on weekdays and Saturdays afternoons. Most of the announcers were laid off and the station revamped the format to a rhythmic Christian music format. This employed contemporary worship music, gospel music and light contemporary Christian songs. WWDJ positioned itself as "The Sound of Praise and Celebration". George Flores was the only air-staffer retained and his afternoon show was pre-recorded. In 2002, local on-air personalities expanded Sylvia Lynn Pate and "Transitions with Sylvia Lynn" which was added to the weekday evening line-up. Pate was WWDJ's first African-American female on-air talent.

This format continued until 2004, when the music was dropped and WWDJ moved to a Christian brokered format. Around this time, Pillar of Fire Church-owned WAWZ (99.1 FM) in Zarephath dropped all but a few religious programs to play contemporary Christian music 18 hours a day, and Salem picked up many of the bumped shows; this caused Salem to decide to air programming full-time on WWDJ. For about two years, the station billed itself "WMCA II" all the time, with the WWDJ call letters used only in the hourly station identification. The station's on-air identity reverted to "970 DJ" by 2007, but programming continued to be overflow programs from WMCA, as well as some syndicated mostly-secular personalities such as Laura Schlessinger and Kevin McCullough. They also broadcast infomercials and church services, as well as 30- and 60-minute religious shows.

=== Becoming a talk station ===
On July 25, 2008, WWDJ swapped call signs with a sister station in the Boston area and briefly became WTTT. It stunted for several days with all-Frank Sinatra ("Frank 97 AM") programming, followed by a short stint of all-Pat Boone ("The Booner 970") music. On August 6, 2008, the station's call letters were changed to WNYM, a transfer of the call sign Salem had used on AM 1330 (now WWRV) since 1981. This change included adopting a conservative talk format. It added Fox News Radio for its world and national newscasts.

John R. Gambling, for many years with 710 WOR, hosted a midday show on WNYM from April 2014 until September 2016. In January 2014, Joe Piscopo became WNYM's morning drive time host. The rest of the schedule on weekdays is from the Salem Radio Network line up of conservative talk shows.
