= Emarel Freshel =

American designer and activist (1867–1949)

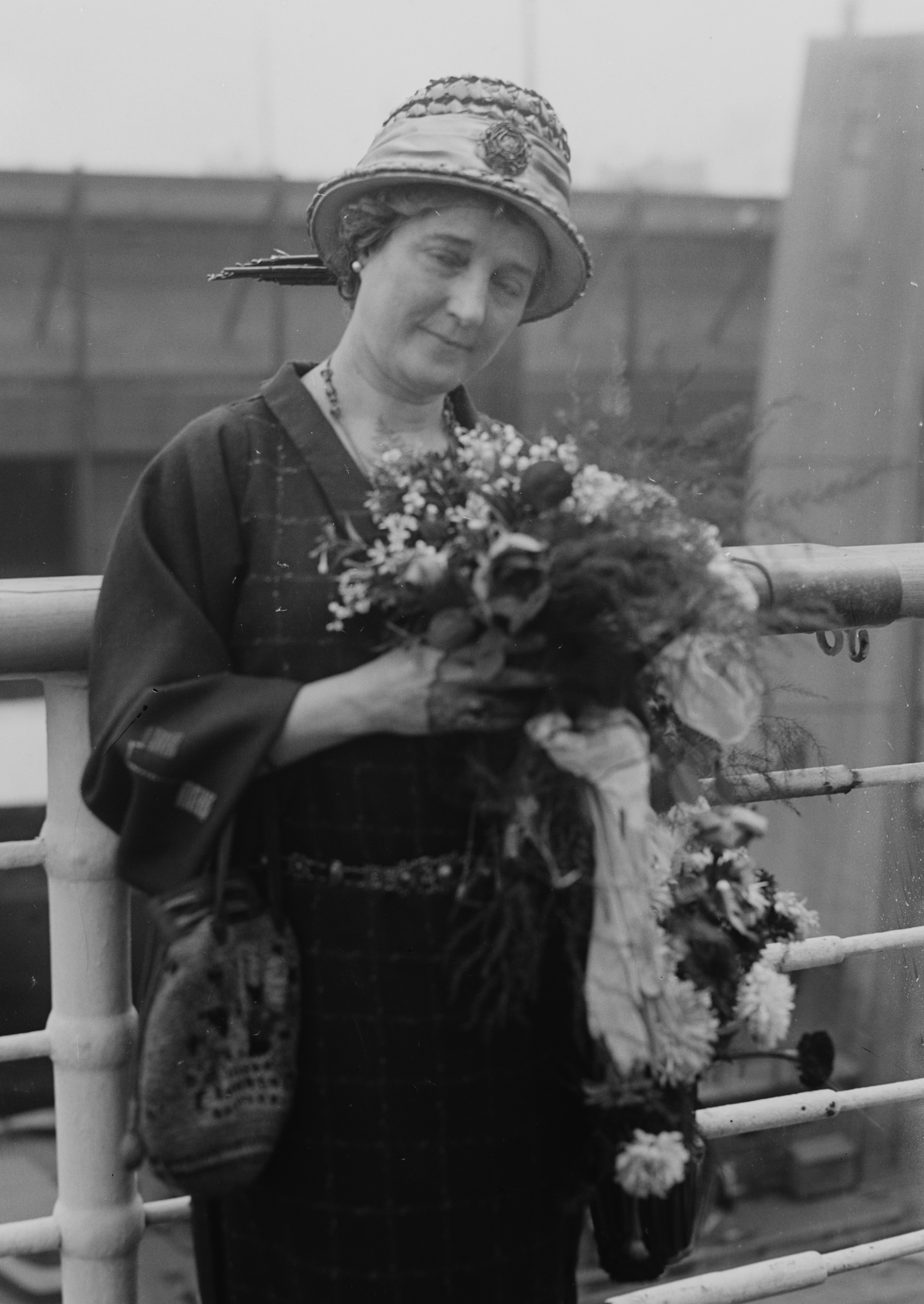
- Freshel c. 1922
- Born: Maud Russell Lorraine Carpenter; 1867; West Virginia
- Died: 1949 (aged 81–82)
- Education: Organtz College
- Occupations: Designer, activist for animal rights and vegetarianism
- Spouses: Ernest R. Sharpe; Curtis P. Freshel (m. 1917)

Maud Russell Lorraine Freshel (née Carpenter; other married name Sharpe; 1867–1949) was an American socialite, designer, and animal rights and vegetarianism activist. She also went by her initials, M. R. L., which she later spelled Emarel.

== Life ==
Maud Russell Lorraine Carpenter was born in 1867 in West Virginia the daughter of Mary Amaryllis "Emma" Bower and Russell Carpenter. She grew up in Chicago and graduated from Organtz College. She married Ernest R. Sharpe of Boston. In 1917, she married Curtis P. Freshel.

Freshel was an anti-vivisectionist, Christian Science practitioner, and vegetarian. She authored the vegetarian cookbook The Golden Rule Cookbook. Her dog was also vegetarian. In 1917, she resigned from the Christian Science church because it supported the entry of the United States into World War I.

Freshel and her husband were friends of George Bernard Shaw, during their travels to England they were occasional guests at his house.

=== Millennium Guild ===
Freshel founded the Millennium Guild in 1912, the first animal rights organization in the United States. The Guild promoted faux fur as an alternative to fur fabrics and recommended a vegetarian diet for ethical reasons. It hosted Thanksgiving dinners at the Copley Plaza hotel in Boston. The Guild's most notable supporter was stage actress Minnie Maddern Fiske.

Members of the Guild wore cotton clothes and avoided all animal-based clothing. By 1913, the Guild reported 200 members. The goal of the organization was to "teach the foremost among the unnecessary evils of the world, and one which underlies most of the other evils, is the mutilation and slaughter of our fellow creatures for food and other selfish ends."

Curtis founded the Millennium Food Company to produce meat substitutes and non-animal foods. Its most successful product was Bakon Yeast, made from hickory smoke. After Freshel died her husband Curtis controlled the Guild and after his death the organization was directed by Pegeen Fitzgerald.

== Design career ==
Mrs. Freshel is traditionally held to be responsible for the original designs of the Wisteria and Pond Lily Tiffany lamps that won the grand prize at the 1902 Prima Exposizione d’Arte Decoration Moderna in Turin, Italy. In 1900, she commissioned Louis Comfort Tiffany to decorate her home in Chestnut Hill, Massachusetts. Included in her sketches was a lampshade modeled after the wisteria that grew there. It is presumed that she exchanged the commercial rights to the design for a reduced fee on the work. However, the recent discovery of Clara Driscoll's letters suggests instead that Driscoll may have been responsible for the Wisteria design.

She designed a Swiss chalet style house for her neighbors Mr. and Mrs. John G. "Jack" Ramsbottom at 86 Commonwealth Avenue in Chestnut Hill. This and her own Tudor style house at 74 were acquired and gutted by Boston College and known as the Philomatheia Club and Alumni Hall, respectively. They were razed in 1988 to make way for dormitories.

== Vegetarian activism ==
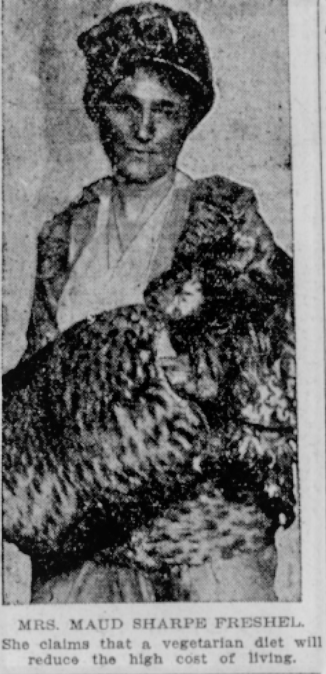
Freshel in The Boston Post, 1919

M. R. L. attended the 1893 Parliament of the World's Religions as a Christian Scientist. There she met Anagarika Dharmapala. In 1917, she left the Christian Science Church when it endorsed entry into World War I. She visited Leo Tolstoy in Russia and Cosima Wagner in Germany. She met George Bernard Shaw, who supposedly gave her the nickname "Emarel" from her initials. Sharpe was known for dressing in faux furs. In 1911, she co-founded the Millennium Guild, named after the prophecy of Isaiah 9:11 of a day when hurting and killing would cease.

Sharpe hosted vegetarian dinners and films of slaughterhouses at her home, which was known as Providence House. She organized an annual vegetarian thanksgiving dinner at Copley Plaza Hotel. She served on the board of the New England Anti-Vivisection Society and was active in the Animal Rescue League of Boston.

== Selected publications ==
- The Golden Rule Cook Book: Six Hundred Recipes for Meatless Dishes. Cambridge, Mass.: University Press. 1908. and subsequent editions through 1926.
- Some Reasons Against the Carnivorous Diet as Given in the Preface to the "Golden Rule Cook Book". Vegetarian Society of New York, 1926.
- Selections From Three Essays By Richard Wagner. Record Press, 1933.
