= History of NBC =

NBC is an American English-language commercial broadcast television and radio network which is owned by Comcast through NBCUniversal. The network is headquartered at 30 Rockefeller Plaza in New York City, with additional major offices near Los Angeles (at 10 Universal City Plaza), and Chicago (at the NBC Tower). Along with ABC and CBS, NBC is one of the traditional "Big Three" American television networks.

NBC was founded in 1926 by the Radio Corporation of America (RCA), a then-subsidiary of General Electric (GE), making it the oldest major broadcast network in the United States. Soon afterwards, the network's ownership expanded to RCA, GE, and Westinghouse. In 1930, GE and Westinghouse were forced to sell their stakes in RCA as a result of antitrust charges; in 1985, control of NBC passed back to GE through its $6.4 billion purchase of RCA, which sold off the entirety of NBC's radio assets. In 2004, French media Vivendi merged its Vivendi Universal Entertainment division with GE to form NBC Universal. Comcast purchased a controlling interest in the company in 2011, and acquired General Electric's remaining stake in 2013.

== Radio ==
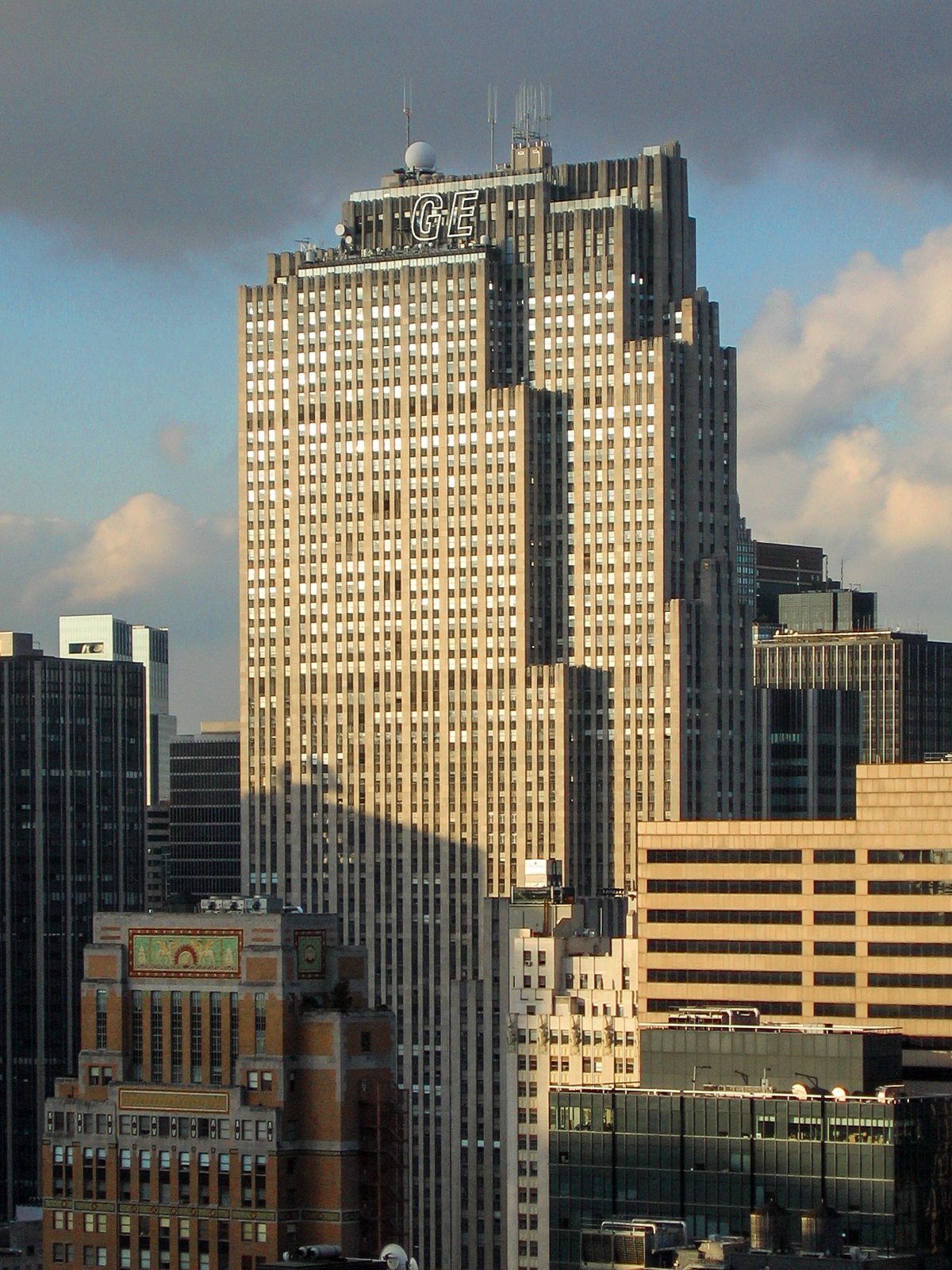
30 Rockefeller Plaza, the headquarters of NBC at Rockefeller Center in New York City

=== Earliest stations: WEAF and WJZ ===
During a period of early broadcast business consolidation, radio manufacturer Radio Corporation of America (RCA) acquired New York City radio station WEAF from American Telephone & Telegraph (AT&T). Westinghouse, a shareholder in RCA, had a competing outlet in Newark pioneer station WJZ (no relation to the radio and television station in Baltimore currently using those call letters), which also served as the flagship for a loosely structured network. This station was transferred from Westinghouse to RCA in 1923, and moved to New York City.

WEAF acted as a laboratory for AT&T's manufacturing and supply outlet Western Electric, whose products included transmitters and antennas. The Bell System, AT&T's telephone utility, was developing technologies to transmit voice- and music-grade audio over short and long distances, using both wireless and wired methods. The creation of WEAF in 1922 offered a research-and-development center for those activities. WEAF maintained a regular schedule of radio programs, including some of the first commercially sponsored programs, and was an immediate success. In an early example of "chain" or "networking" broadcasting, the station linked with Outlet Company-owned WJAR in Providence, Rhode Island; and with AT&T's station in Washington, D.C., WCAP.

New parent RCA saw an advantage in sharing programming, and after getting a license for radio station WRC in Washington, D.C., in 1923, attempted to transmit audio between cities via low-quality telegraph lines. AT&T refused outside companies access to its high-quality phone lines. The early effort fared poorly, since the uninsulated telegraph lines were susceptible to atmospheric and other electrical interference.

In 1925, AT&T decided that WEAF and its embryonic network were incompatible with the company's primary goal of providing a telephone service. AT&T offered to sell the station to RCA in a deal that included the right to lease AT&T's phone lines for network transmission.

=== Red and Blue Networks ===
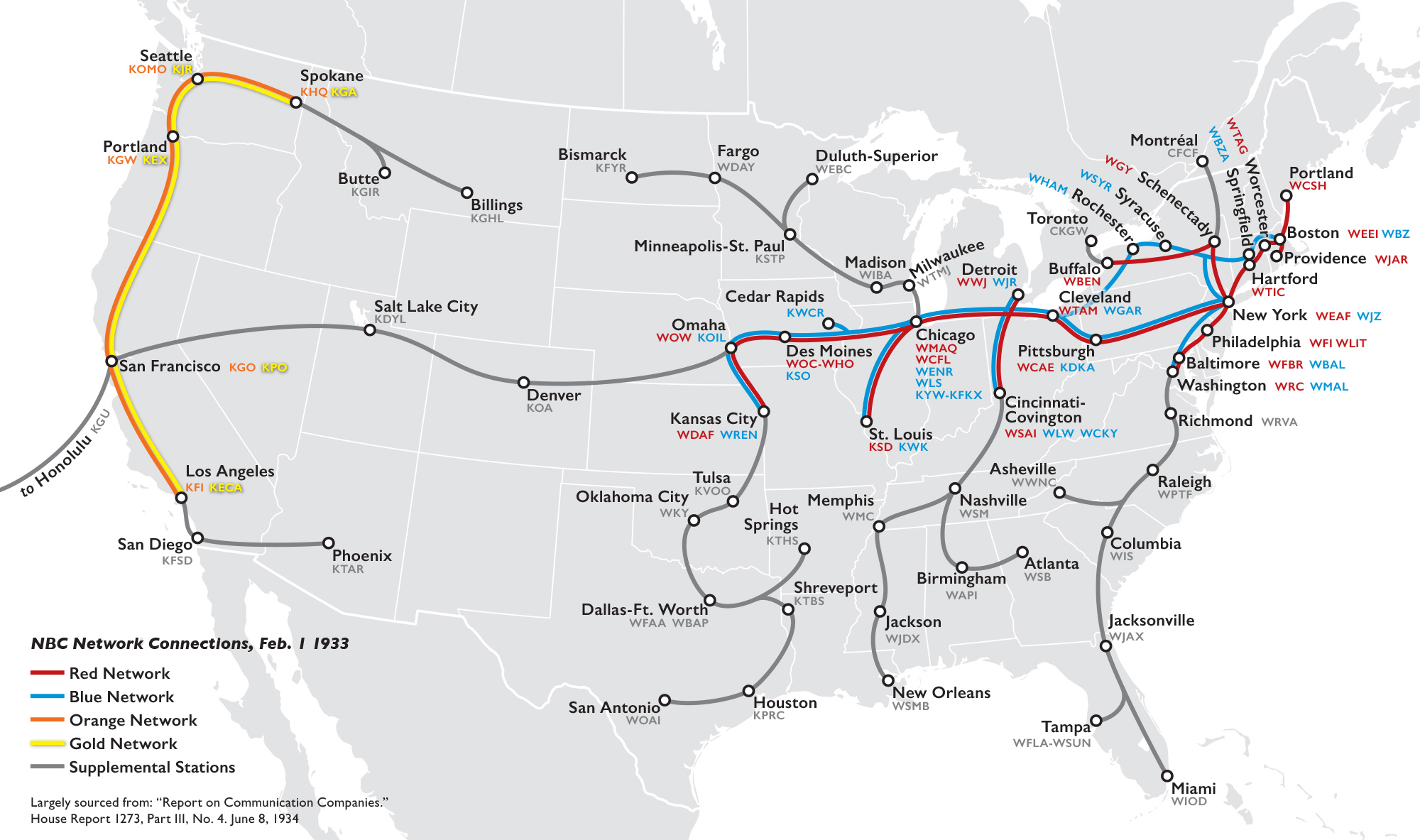
NBC networks, 1933

RCA spent $1 million to purchase WEAF and Washington sister station WCAP, shutting down the latter station, and merged its facilities with surviving station WRC; in late 1926, it subsequently announced the creation of a new division known as the National Broadcasting Company (its official corporate name was National Broadcasting Company, Inc.). The division's ownership was split among RCA (a majority partner at 50%), its founding corporate parent General Electric (which owned 30%) and Westinghouse (which owned the remaining 20%). NBC officially started broadcasting on November 15, 1926.

WEAF and WJZ, the flagships of the two earlier networks, were operated side by side for about a year as part of the new NBC. On January 1, 1927, NBC formally divided their respective marketing strategies: the "Red Network" offered commercially sponsored entertainment and music programming; the "Blue Network" mostly carried sustaining – or non-sponsored – broadcasts, especially news and cultural programs. Various histories of NBC suggest the color designations for the two networks came from the color of the pushpins NBC engineers used to designate affiliate stations of WEAF (red) and WJZ (blue), or from the use of double-ended red and blue colored pencils.

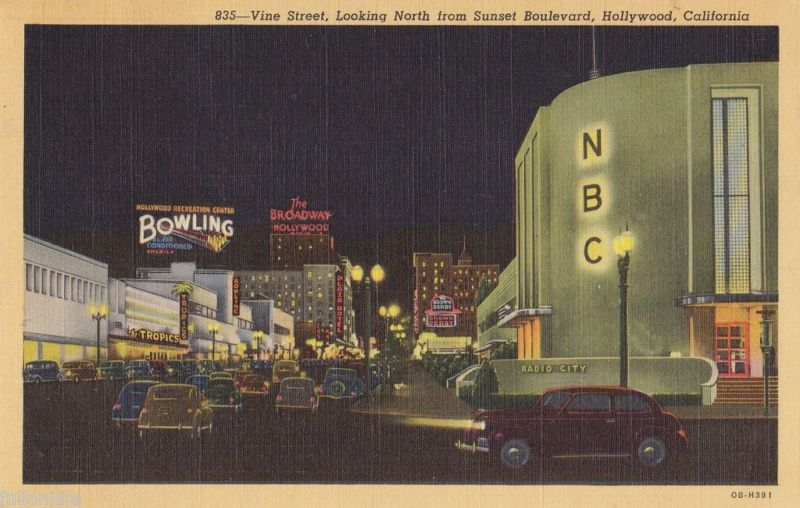
Radio City West was located at Sunset Boulevard and Vine Street in Los Angeles until it was replaced by a bank in the mid-1960s.

On April 5, 1927, NBC expanded to the West Coast with the launch of the NBC Orange Network, also known as the Pacific Coast Network. This was followed by the debut of the NBC Gold Network, also known as the Pacific Gold Network, on October 18, 1931. The Orange Network carried Red Network programming, and the Gold Network carried programming from the Blue Network. Initially, the Orange Network recreated Eastern Red Network programming for West Coast stations at KPO in San Francisco. In 1936, the Orange Network affiliate stations became part of the Red Network, and at the same time, the Gold Network became part of the Blue Network.

In 1927, NBC moved its operations to 711 Fifth Avenue in Manhattan, occupying the upper floors of a building designed by architect Floyd Brown. NBC outgrew the Fifth Avenue facilities in 1933.

In the 1930s, NBC also developed a network for shortwave radio stations, called the NBC White Network.

In 1930, the US Government charged General Electric, and by association, Westinghouse, with antitrust violations, resulting in the companies' divestitures in RCA. The newly separate company signed leases to move its corporate headquarters into the new Rockefeller Center in 1931. John D. Rockefeller Jr., founder and financier of Rockefeller Center, arranged the deal with GE chairman Owen D. Young and RCA president David Sarnoff. When it moved into the complex in 1933, RCA became the lead tenant at 30 Rockefeller Plaza, known as the "RCA Building" (later the GE Building, now the Comcast Building), which housed NBC's production studios as well as theaters for RCA-owned RKO Pictures.

=== Chimes ===
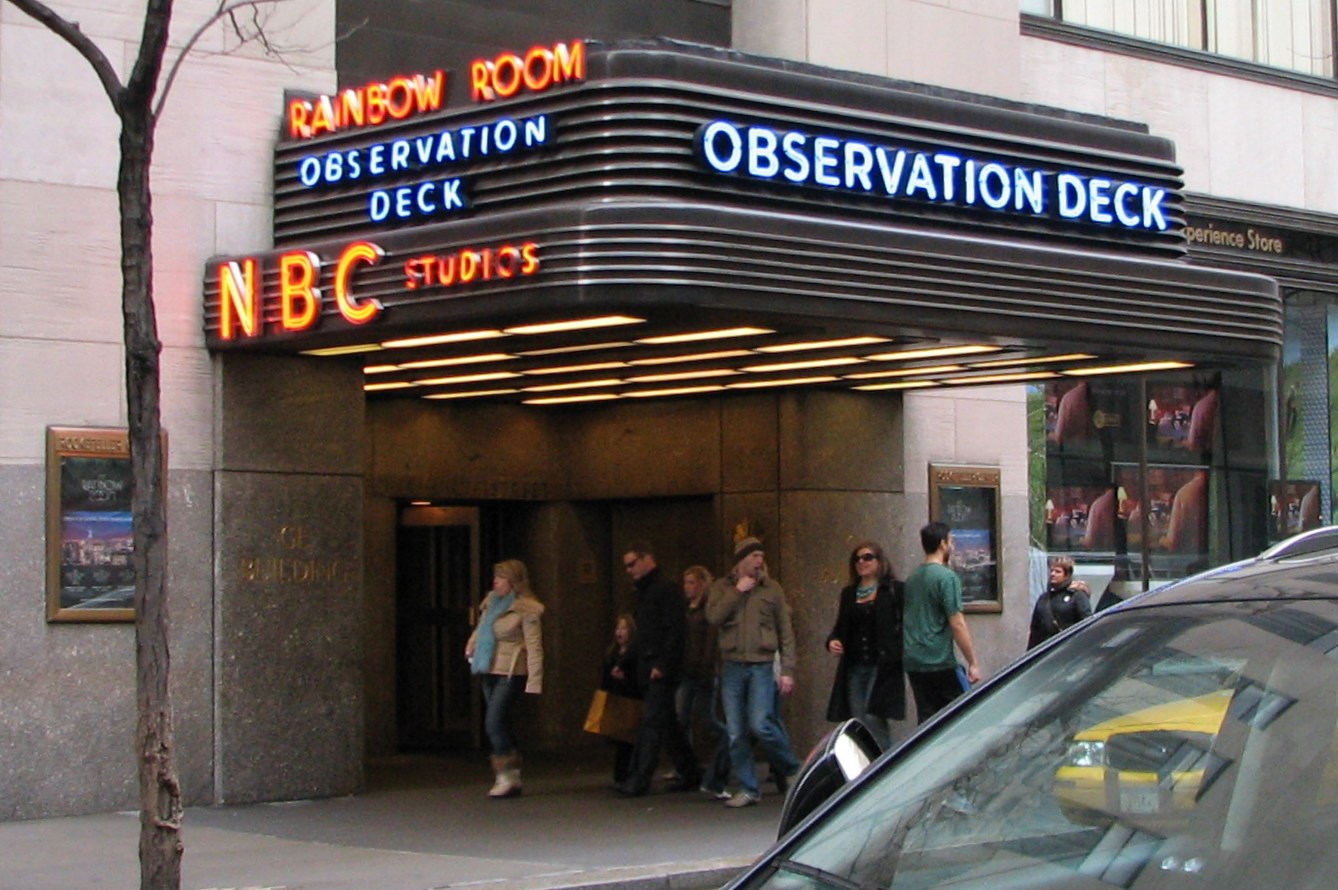
NBC entrance at 30 Rockefeller Plaza

The iconic three-note NBC chimes came about after several years of development. The three-note sequence, G-E'-C', was first heard over Red Network affiliate WSB in Atlanta, with a second inversion C-major triad as its outline. An executive at NBC's New York headquarters heard the WSB version of the notes during the networked broadcast of a Georgia Tech football game and asked permission to use it on the national network. NBC started to use the chimes sequence in 1931, and it eventually became the first audio trademark to be accepted by the U.S. Patent and Trademark Office.

A variant sequence with an additional note, G-E'-C'-G, known as "the fourth chime", was used during significant events of extreme urgency (including during World War II, especially in the wake of the December 1941 attack on Pearl Harbor; on D-Day and during disasters). The NBC chimes were mechanized in 1932 by Rangertone founder Richard H. Ranger; their purpose was to send a low-level signal of constant amplitude that would be heard by the various switching stations staffed by NBC and AT&T engineers, and to be used as a system cue for switching individual stations between the Red and Blue network feeds. Contrary to popular legend, the G'-E'-C' notes were not originally intended to reference General Electric (an early shareholder in NBC's founding parent RCA and whose radio station in Schenectady, New York, WGY, was an early affiliate of NBC Red). The three-note sequence remains in use by the NBC television network. As an example, it is incorporated into the theme music used by NBC News. In the late 1930s, Baltimore and Ohio Railroad (B&O) reached an agreement with NBC for B&O to be allowed to use NBC's tones to summon the railroad's passengers to dinner on its trains.

=== New beginnings: The Blue Network becomes ABC ===
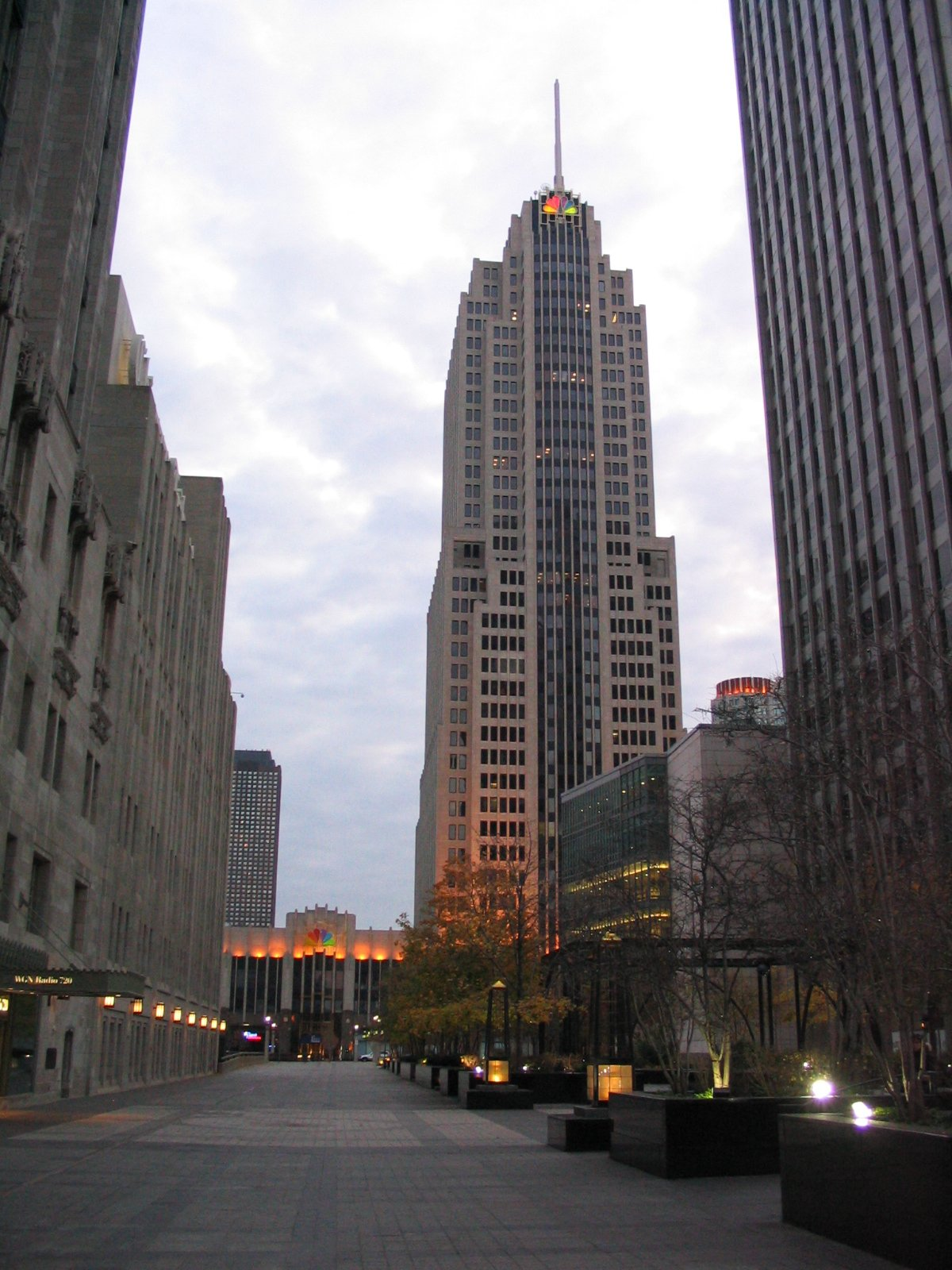
NBC Tower in Chicago

In 1934, the Mutual Broadcasting System filed a complaint to the Federal Communications Commission (FCC), following the government agency's creation, claiming it ran into difficulties trying to establish new radio stations in a market largely controlled by NBC and the Columbia Broadcasting System (CBS). In 1938, the FCC began a series of investigations into the monopolistic effects of network broadcasting. A report published by the commission in 1939 found that NBC's two networks and its owned-and-operated stations dominated audiences, affiliates and advertising in American radio; this led the commission to file an order to RCA to divest itself of either NBC Red or NBC Blue.

After Mutual's appeals were rejected by the FCC, RCA filed its own appeal to overturn the divestiture order. However, in 1941, the company decided to sell NBC Blue in the event its appeal was denied. The Blue Network was formally named NBC Blue Network, Inc. and NBC Red became NBC Red Network, Inc. for corporate purposes. Both networks formally divorced their operations on January 8, 1942, with the Blue Network being referred to on-air as either "Blue" or "Blue Network", and Blue Network Company, Inc. serving as its official corporate name. NBC Red, meanwhile, became known on-air as simply "NBC". Investment firm Dillon, Read & Co. placed a $7.5 million bid for NBC Blue, an offer that was rejected by NBC executive Mark Woods and RCA president David Sarnoff.

After losing on final appeal before the U.S. Supreme Court in May 1943, RCA sold Blue Network Company, Inc., for $8 million to the American Broadcasting System, a recently founded company owned by Life Savers magnate Edward J. Noble. After the sale was completed on October 12, 1943, Noble acquired the rights to the Blue Network name, leases on landlines, the New York studios, two-and-a-half radio stations (WJZ in Newark/New York City; KGO in San Francisco and WENR in Chicago, which shared a frequency with Prairie Farmer station WLS); contracts with actors; and agreements with around 60 affiliates. In turn, to comply with FCC radio station ownership limits of the time, Noble sold off his existing New York City radio station WMCA. Noble, who wanted a better name for the network, acquired the branding rights to the "American Broadcasting Company" name from George B. Storer in 1944. The Blue Network became ABC officially on June 15, 1945, after the sale was completed.

=== Defining radio's golden age ===
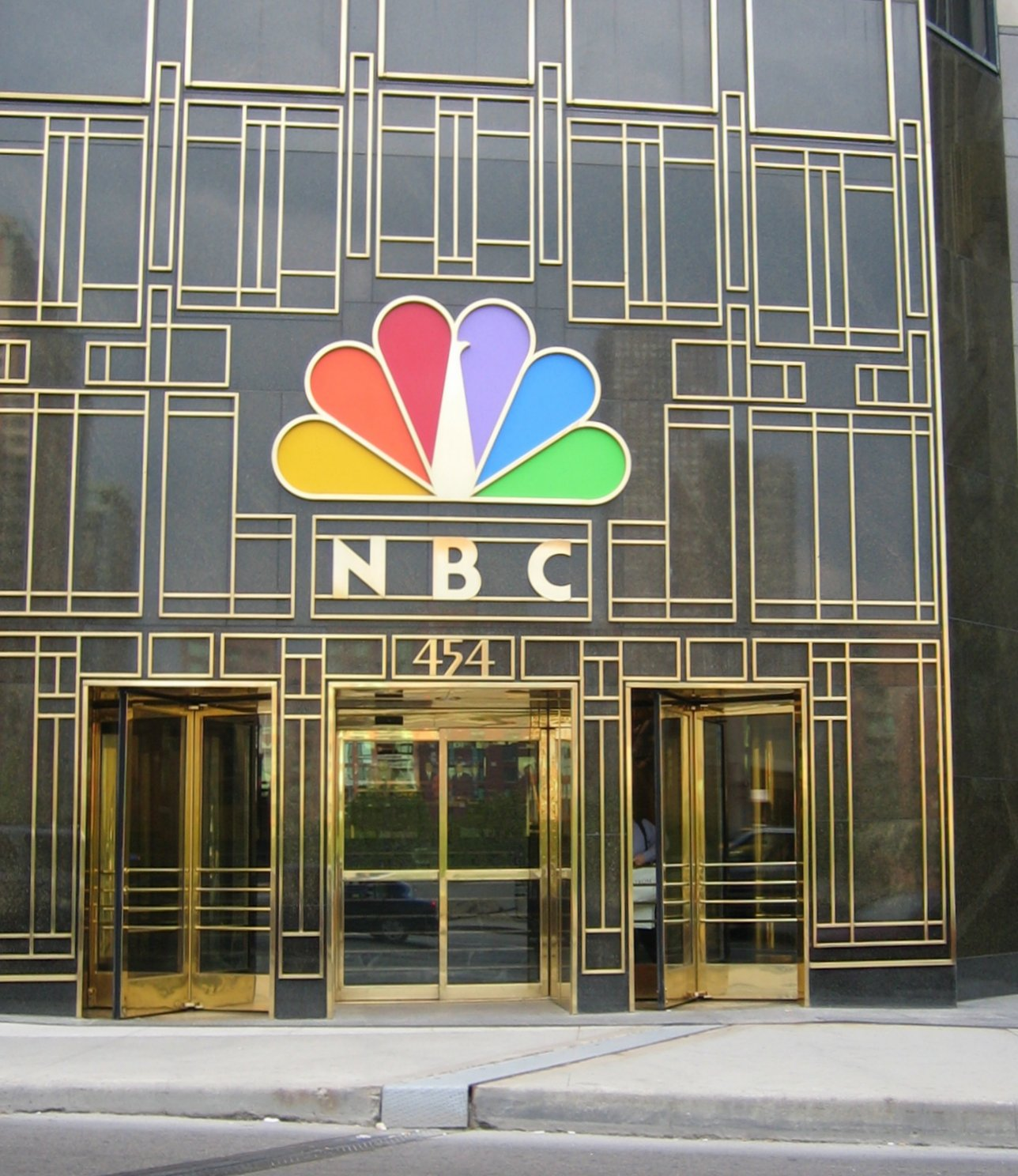
The front entrance of the NBC Tower at 454 N. Columbus Drive in Chicago.

NBC became home to many of the most popular performers and programs on the air. Bing Crosby, Al Jolson, Jack Benny, Edgar Bergen, Bob Hope, Fred Allen, and Burns and Allen called NBC home, as did Arturo Toscanini's NBC Symphony Orchestra, which the network helped him create. Other programs featured on the network included Vic and Sade, Fibber McGee and Molly, The Great Gildersleeve, One Man's Family, Ma Perkins and Death Valley Days. NBC stations were often the most powerful, and some occupied unique clear-channel national frequencies, reaching hundreds or thousands of miles at night.

In the late 1940s, rival CBS gained ground by allowing radio stars to use their own production companies to produce programs, which became a profitable move for much of its talent. In the early years of radio, stars and programs commonly hopped between networks when their short-term contracts expired. During 1948 and 1949, beginning with the nation's top radio star, Jack Benny, many NBC performers – including Edgar Bergen and Charlie McCarthy, Burns and Allen and Frank Sinatra – jumped to CBS.

In addition, NBC stars began migrating to television, including comedian Milton Berle, whose Texaco Star Theater on the network became television's first major hit. Conductor Arturo Toscanini conducted the NBC Symphony Orchestra in ten television concerts on NBC between 1948 and 1952. The concerts were broadcast on both television and radio, in what perhaps was the first such instance of simulcasting. Two of the concerts were historic firsts – the first complete telecast of Beethoven's Symphony No. 9, and the first complete telecast of Verdi's Aida (starring Herva Nelli and Richard Tucker), performed in concert rather than with scenery and costumes.

Aiming to keep classic radio alive as television matured, and to challenge CBS's Sunday night radio lineup, which featured much of the programs and talent that had moved to that network following the defection of Jack Benny to CBS, NBC launched The Big Show in November 1950. This 90-minute variety show updated radio's earliest musical variety style with sophisticated comedy and dramatic presentations. Featuring stage legend Tallulah Bankhead as hostess, it lured prestigious entertainers, including Fred Allen, Groucho Marx, Lauritz Melchior, Ethel Barrymore, Louis Armstrong, Ethel Merman, Bob Hope, Danny Thomas, Douglas Fairbanks Jr. and Ella Fitzgerald. However, The Big Show's initial success did not last despite critical praise, as most of its potential listeners were increasingly becoming television viewers. The show lasted two years, with NBC losing around $1 million on the project (the network was only able to sell advertising time during the middle half-hour of the program each week).

NBC's last major radio programming push, beginning on June 12, 1955, was Monitor, a creation of NBC President Sylvester "Pat" Weaver, who also created the innovative programs Today, The Tonight Show and Home for the companion television network. Monitor was a continuous all-weekend mixture of music, news, interviews, and features, with a variety of hosts including well-known television personalities Dave Garroway, Hugh Downs, Ed McMahon, Joe Garagiola, and Gene Rayburn. The potpourri show tried to keep vintage radio alive by featuring segments from Jim and Marian Jordan (in character as Fibber McGee and Molly); Peg Lynch's dialog comedy Ethel and Albert (with Alan Bunce); and iconoclastic satirist Henry Morgan. Monitor was a success for a number of years, but after the mid-1960s, local stations, especially those in larger markets, were reluctant to break from their established formats to run non-conforming network programming. One exception was Toscanini: The Man Behind the Legend, a weekly series commemorating the great conductor's NBC broadcasts and recordings which ran for several years beginning in 1963. After Monitor ended its 20-year run on January 26, 1975, little remained of NBC network radio beyond hourly newscasts and news features, and Sunday morning religious program The Eternal Light.

=== Decline ===
On June 18, 1975, NBC launched the NBC News and Information Service (NIS), which provided up to 55 minutes of news per hour around the clock to local stations that wanted to adopt an all-news radio format. NBC carried the service on WRC in Washington, and on its owned-and-operated FM stations in New York City, Chicago and San Francisco. NIS attracted several dozen subscribing stations, but by the fall of 1976, NBC determined that it could not project that the service would ever become profitable and gave its affiliates six months' notice that it would be discontinued. NIS ended operations on May 29, 1977. In 1979, NBC launched The Source, a modestly successful secondary network providing news and short features to FM rock stations.

The NBC Radio Network also pioneered personal advice call-in national talk radio with a satellite-distributed evening talk show, TalkNet; the program featured Bruce Williams (providing personal financial advice), Bernard Meltzer (personal and financial advice) and Sally Jessy Raphael (personal and romantic advice). While never much of a ratings success, TalkNet nonetheless helped further the national talk radio format. For affiliates, many of them struggling AM stations, TalkNet helped fill evening time slots with free programming, allowing the stations to sell local advertising in a dynamic format without the cost associated with producing local programming. Some in the industry feared this trend would lead to increasing control of radio content by networks and syndicators.

=== Sale and dissolution ===
GE reacquired RCA at the end of 1985, then announced their intent to sell off RCA's non-broadcast assets and NBC's radio holdings. After a failed attempt to sell the entire radio unit to Westinghouse Broadcasting (Group W), Culver City, California–based syndicator Westwood One (which already owned the Mutual Broadcasting System) bought the NBC Radio Network, The Source, NBC Talknet and NBC Radio Entertainment, along with leases to the radio network's facilities, for $50 million (equivalent to $142 million in 2025). The radio stations were sold off in multiple transactions between 1988 and 1989, including Emmis Communications, Westinghouse and Susquehanna Radio Corporation.

By January 1989, Westwood One announced NBC Radio News would move to Mutual's Arlington, Virginia, facility; engineering operations followed along with the affiliate relations department. Further consolidation in 1992 saw Mutual and NBC newscasts jointly produced in overnights and weekends and both networks airing generic sportscasts through the weekend. After Westwood One purchased Unistar Radio Networks from Infinity Broadcasting in 1994, Infinity purchased 25 percent of Westwood One, becoming its largest shareholder and assuming control. Infinity would then be acquired by Westinghouse Electric Corporation (now the parent of newly merged CBS/Westinghouse Broadcasting) for $5 billion in June 1996 (equivalent to $10.3 billion in 2025), with the CBS Radio Network also falling under Westwood One management.

The Mutual/NBC newsroom in Arlington closed on August 31, 1998, with CBS Radio News originating "Mutual" and "NBC" newscasts from New York. These "NBC"–branded newscasts produced by CBS were then restricted to morning drive (ET) on weekdays beginning on April 17, 1999, concurrent with Westwood One retiring the Mutual name outright. Remaining NBC affiliates were offered CNN Radio newscasts at all other times.

Westwood One would continue to feature "NBC"–branded programming, partnering with NBC News to launch NBC News Radio on March 31, 2003, anchored by NBC and MSNBC talent, but limited to one-minute newscasts on weekdays. An audio simulcast of Meet the Press was also distributed by Westwood One starting in 2004 and continues to this day. Following a 2007 buyout, Westwood One was merged into Oaktree Capital Management's Triton Media subsidiary Dial Global in 2011, taking that syndicator's name. Dial Global ended distribution of CNN Radio newscasts and made NBC News Radio a full-time operation in April 2012, with most CNN affiliates switching to NBC. NBC Sports Radio was launched that September as a Dial Global/NBC Sports joint venture. NBC Sports Radio ended 24/7 programming at the end of 2018, and was shut down outright in March 2020.

Cumulus Media acquired Dial Global in 2013, which reverted to the Westwood One name and was merged into Cumulus Media Networks. After Cumulus announced a content-sharing deal with CNN as part of the pending launch of white-label news service Westwood One News, NBC News Radio ended operations on December 15, 2014. Since July 2016, iHeartMedia has produced "NBC News Radio"–branded newscasts via a licensing agreement with NBCUniversal.

== Television ==
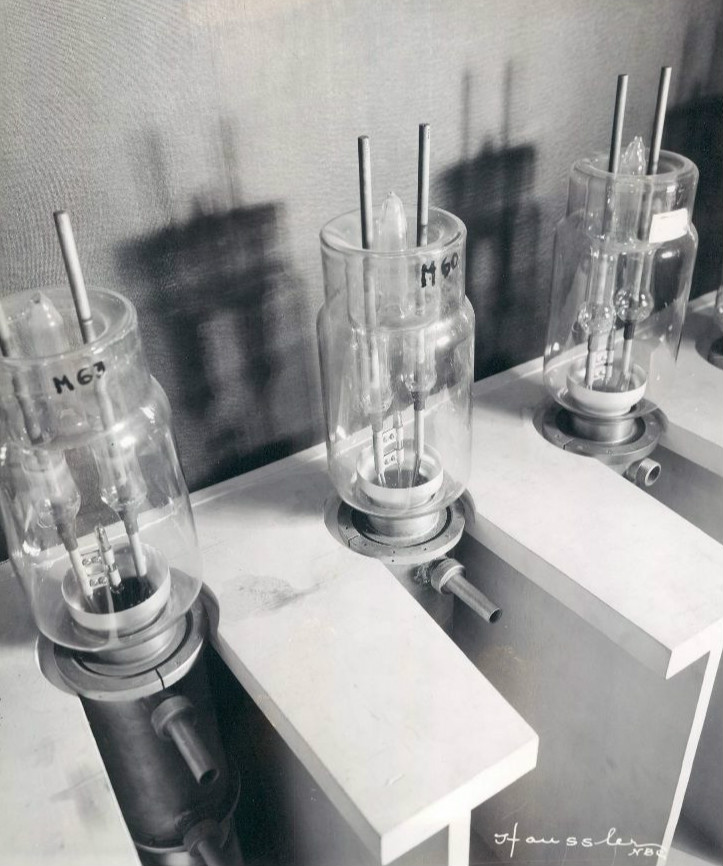
High frequency tubes in the tube room. They were used for the NBC television transmitter, 1936. NBC kept 220 tubes in reserve for their transmitter.

For many years, NBC was closely identified with David Sarnoff, who used it as a vehicle to sell consumer electronics. RCA and Sarnoff had captured the spotlight by introducing all-electronic television to the public at the 1939–40 New York World's Fair, simultaneously initiating a regular schedule of programs on the NBC-RCA television station in New York City. President Franklin D. Roosevelt appeared at the fair before the NBC camera, becoming the first U.S. president to appear on television on April 30, 1939 (an actual, off-the-monitor photograph of the FDR telecast is available at the David Sarnoff Library). The broadcast was transmitted by NBC's New York television station W2XBS Channel 1 (later WNBC-TV; now WNBC, channel 4) and was seen by about 1,000 viewers within the station's roughly 40-mile (64 km) coverage area from its transmitter at the Empire State Building.

The following day (May 1), four models of RCA television sets went on sale to the general public in various department stores around New York City, which were promoted in a series of splashy newspaper ads. DuMont Laboratories (and others) had actually offered the first home sets in 1938 in anticipation of NBC's announced April 1939 television launch. Later in 1939, NBC took its cameras to professional football and baseball games in the New York City area, establishing many "firsts" in television broadcasting.

Reportedly, the first NBC Television "network" program was broadcast on January 12, 1940, when a play titled Meet The Wife was originated at the W2XBS studios at Rockefeller Center and rebroadcast by W2XB/W2XAF (now WRGB) in Schenectady, which received the New York station directly off-air from a tower atop a mountain and relayed the live signal to the Capital District. About this time, occasional special events were also broadcast in Philadelphia (over W3XE, later called WPTZ, now known as KYW-TV) as well as Schenectady. The most ambitious NBC television "network" program of the pre-war era was the telecast of the Republican National Convention held in Philadelphia in the summer of 1940, which was fed live to the New York City and Schenectady stations. However, despite major promotion by RCA, television sales in New York from 1939 to 1942 were disappointing, primarily due to the high cost of the sets, and the lack of compelling regularly scheduled programming. During this period, only a few thousand television sets were sold in the New York area, most of which were sold to bars, hotels and other public places, where the general public viewed special sports and news events. One special event was Franklin D. Roosevelt's second and final appearance on live television, when his speech at Madison Square Garden on October 28, 1940, was telecast over W2XBS to receivers in the New York City area.

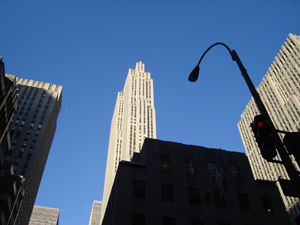
30 Rockefeller Center, also known as the Comcast Building, is the world headquarters of NBC.

Television's experimental period ended, as the FCC allowed full-fledged commercial television broadcasts to begin on July 1, 1941. NBC station W2XBS in New York City received the first commercial license, adopting the call letters WNBT. The first official, paid television advertisement broadcast by any U.S. station was for watch manufacturer Bulova, which aired that day, just before the start of a Brooklyn Dodgers baseball telecast on WNBT. The ad consisted of test pattern, featuring the newly assigned WNBT call letters, which was modified to resemble a clock – complete with functioning hands – with the Bulova logo (featuring the phrase "Bulova Watch Time") in the lower right-hand quadrant of the test pattern (a photograph of the NBC camera setting up the test pattern-advertisement for that ad can be seen at this page). Among the programs that aired during the first week of WNBT's new, commercial schedule was The Sunoco News, a simulcast of the Sun Oil-sponsored NBC Radio program anchored by Lowell Thomas; amateur boxing at Jamaica Arena; the Eastern Clay Courts tennis championships; programming from the USO; the spelling bee-type game show Words on the Wing; a few feature films; and a one-time-only, test broadcast of the game show Truth or Consequences, sponsored by Lever Brothers.

Prior to the first commercial television broadcasts and paid advertisements on WNBT, non-paid television advertising existed on an experimental basis dating back to 1930. NBC's earliest non-paid television commercials may have been those seen during the first Major League Baseball game ever telecast, between the Brooklyn Dodgers and Cincinnati Reds, on August 26, 1939, over W2XBS. To secure the rights to televise the game, NBC allowed each of the Dodgers' regular radio sponsors at the time to have one commercial during the telecast. The ads were conducted by Dodgers announcer Red Barber: for Ivory Soap, he held up a bar of the product; for Mobilgas he put on a filling station attendant's cap while giving his spiel; and for Wheaties he poured a bowl of the product, added milk and bananas, and took a big spoonful. Limited, commercial programming continued until the U.S. entered World War II. Telecasts were curtailed in the early years of the war, then expanded as NBC began to prepare for full-time service upon the end of the war. Even before the war concluded, a few programs were sent from New York City to affiliated stations in Philadelphia (WPTZ) and Albany/Schenectady (WRGB) on a regular weekly schedule beginning in 1944, the first of which is generally considered to be the pioneering special interest/documentary show The Voice of Firestone Televues, a television offshoot of The Voice of Firestone, a mainstay on NBC radio since 1928, which was transmitted from New York City to Philadelphia and Schenectady on a regular, weekly basis beginning on April 10, 1944. The series is considered to be the NBC television network's first regularly scheduled program. Also in 1944, "The War As It Happens" came to television on a weekly basis. "The War As It Happens" began as a local program, but NBC records indicate that in April 1944, it was fed to Schenectady and Philadelphia on the fledgling NBC Television Network and became the first news cast regularly seen in multiple cities.

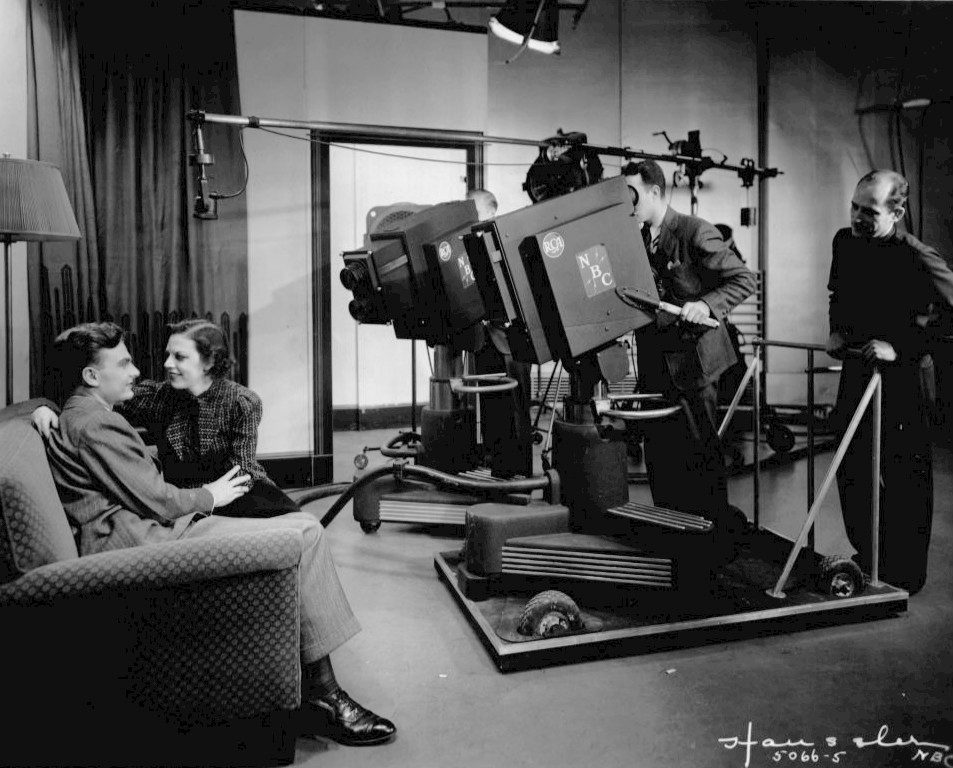
Grace Brandt and Eddie Albert in an early NBC television program The Honeymooners-Grace and Eddie Show

On V-E Day, May 8, 1945, WNBT broadcast several hours of news coverage and remotes from around New York City. This event was promoted in advance by NBC with a direct-mail card sent to television set owners in the New York area. At one point, a WNBT camera placed atop the marquee of the Hotel Astor panned the crowd below celebrating the end of the war in Europe. The vivid coverage was a prelude to television's rapid growth after the war ended.

The NBC television network grew from its initial post-war line-up of four stations. The 1947 World Series featured two New York City area teams (the Yankees and the Dodgers), and television sales boomed locally, since the games were being telecast in the New York market. Additional stations along the East Coast and in the Midwest were connected by coaxial cable through the late 1940s, and in September 1951 the first transcontinental telecasts took place.

The post-war 1940s and early 1950s brought success for NBC in the new medium. Television's first major star, Milton Berle, whose Texaco Star Theatre began in June 1948, drew the first large audiences to NBC Television. Also in 1948, NBC expanded to broadcast syndication by hiring Russell Johnston to launch the Television Featues Service. Under its innovative president, Sylvester "Pat" Weaver, the network launched Today and The Tonight Show, which would bookend the broadcast day for over 50 years, and which still lead their competitors. Weaver, who also launched the genre of periodic 90-minute network "spectaculars", network-produced motion pictures and the live 90-minute Sunday afternoon series Wide Wide World, left the network in 1955 in a dispute with its chairman David Sarnoff, who subsequently named his son Robert Sarnoff as president.

In 1951, NBC commissioned Italian-American composer Gian Carlo Menotti to compose the first opera ever written for television; Menotti came up with Amahl and the Night Visitors, a 45-minute work for which he wrote both music and libretto, about a disabled shepherd boy who meets the Three Wise Men and is miraculously cured when he offers his crutch to the newborn Christ Child. It was such a stunning success that it was repeated every year on NBC from 1951 to 1966, when a dispute between Menotti and NBC ended the broadcasts. However, by 1978, Menotti and NBC had patched things up, and an all-new production of the opera, filmed partly on location in the Middle East, was telecast that year.

=== Color television ===
While rival CBS broadcast the first color television programs in the United States, their system was incompatible with the millions of black and white sets in use at the time. After a series of limited, incompatible color broadcasts (mostly scheduled during the day), CBS abandoned the system and broadcasts. This opened the door for the RCA-compatible color system to be adopted as the U.S. standard. RCA convinced the FCC to approve its color system in December 1953. NBC was ready with color programming within days of the commission's decision. NBC began the transition with a few shows in 1954, and broadcast its first program to air all episodes in color beginning that summer, The Marriage.

In 1955, NBC broadcast a live production in color of Peter Pan, a new Broadway musical adaptation of J. M. Barrie's beloved play, on the Producers' Showcase anthology series, The first such telecast of its kind, the broadcast starred the musical's entire original cast, led by Mary Martin as Peter and Cyril Ritchard in a dual role as Mr. Darling and Captain Hook. The broadcast drew the highest ratings for a television program for that period. It was so successful that NBC restaged it as a live broadcast a mere ten months later; in 1960, long after Producers' Showcase had ended its run, Peter Pan, with most of the 1955 cast, was restaged again, this time as a standalone special, and was videotaped so that it would no longer have to be performed live on television.

In 1956, NBC started a subsidiary, California National Productions (CNP), for merchandising, syndication and NBC opera company operations with the production of Silent Services. By 1957, NBC planned to remove the opera company from CNP and CNP was in discussion with MGM Television about handling syndication distribution for MGM series.

During a National Association of Broadcasters meeting in Chicago in 1956, NBC announced that its owned-and-operated station in that market, WNBQ (now WMAQ-TV), had become the first television station in the country to broadcast its programming in color (airing at least six hours of color broadcasts each day). In 1959, NBC premiered a televised version of the radio program The Bell Telephone Hour, which aired in color from its debut; the program would continue on the NBC television network for nine more years until it ended in 1968.

In 1961, NBC approached Walt Disney about acquiring the rights to his anthology series, offering to produce the program in color. Disney was in the midst of negotiating a new contract to keep the program (then known as Walt Disney Presents) on ABC; however, ABC president Leonard Goldenson said that it could not counter the offer, as the network did not have the technical and financial resources to carry the program in color. Disney subsequently struck a deal with NBC, which began airing the anthology series in the format in September 1961 (as Walt Disney's Wonderful World of Color). As many of the Disney programs that aired in black-and-white on ABC were actually filmed in color, they could easily be re-aired in the format on the NBC broadcasts. In January 1962, NBC's telecast of the Rose Bowl became the first college football game ever to be telecast in color.

By 1963, much of NBC's prime time schedule was presented in color, although some popular series (such as The Man from U.N.C.L.E., which premiered in late 1964) were broadcast in black-and-white for their entire first season. In the fall of 1965, NBC was broadcasting 95% of its prime time schedule in color (with the exceptions of I Dream of Jeannie and Convoy), and began billing itself as "The Full Color Network." Without television sets to sell, rival networks followed more slowly, finally committing to an all-color lineup in prime time in the 1966–67 season. Days of Our Lives became the first soap opera to premiere in color, when it debuted in November 1965.

NBC contracted with Universal Studios in 1964 to produce the first feature-length film produced for television, See How They Run, which first aired on October 17, 1964; its second television movie, The Hanged Man, aired six weeks later on November 28. Even while the presentations performed well in the ratings, NBC did not broadcast another made-for-TV film for two years.

In 1967, NBC reached a deal with Metro-Goldwyn-Mayer (MGM) to acquire the broadcast rights to the classic 1939 film The Wizard of Oz. CBS, which had televised the film annually since 1956, refused to meet MGM's increased fee to renew its television rights. Oz had been, up to then, one of the few programs that CBS had telecast in color. However, by 1967, color broadcasts had become standard on television, and the film simply became another title in the list of specials that NBC telecast in the format. The film's showings on NBC were distinctive as it televised The Wizard of Oz without a hosted introduction, as CBS had long done; it was also slightly edited for time in order to make room to air more commercials. Despite the cuts, however, it continued to score excellent television ratings in those pre-VCR days, as audiences were generally unable to see the film any other way at that time. NBC aired The Wizard of Oz each year from 1968 to 1976, when CBS, realizing that they may have committed a colossal blunder by letting a huge ratings success like Oz go to another network, agreed to pay MGM more money to re-acquire the rights to show the film.

The late 1960s brought big changes in the programming practices of the major television networks. As baby boomers reached adulthood, NBC, CBS, and ABC began to realize that much of their existing programming had not only been running for years but had audiences that skewed older. To attract the large youth population that was highly attractive to advertisers, the networks moved to clean house of a number of veteran shows. In NBC's case, this included programs like The Bell Telephone Hour and Sing Along With Mitch, which both had an average viewer age of 50. During this period, the networks came to define adults between the ages of 18 and 49 as their main target audience, although depending on the show, this could be subdivided into other age demos: 35–45, 18–25 or 18–35. Regardless of the exact target demographic, the general idea was to appeal to viewers who were not close to retirement age, and to modernize television programming, which the networks felt overall was stuck in a 1950s mentality, to more closely resemble contemporary American society.

=== 1970s doldrums ===
The 1970s started strongly for NBC thanks to hits like The Flip Wilson Show, Adam-12, Rowan & Martin's Laugh-In, Ironside and The Dean Martin Show. However, despite the success of such new shows as Sanford and Son, Chico and the Man, the NBC Mystery Movie, Little House on the Prairie, The Midnight Special, The Rockford Files, Police Woman, and Emergency!, as well as continued success from veterans like The Tonight Show Starring Johnny Carson and The Wonderful World of Disney, the network entered a slump in the middle of the decade. Disney, in particular, saw its ratings nosedive once CBS put 60 Minutes up against the program in the Sunday 7:00 p.m. time slot in the 1975–76 season.

In 1974, under new president Herbert Schlosser, the network tried to attract younger viewers with a series of costly movies, miniseries and specials. This failed to attract the desirable 18–34 demographic, and simultaneously alienated older viewers. None of the new prime-time shows that NBC introduced in the fall of 1975 earned a second season renewal, all failing in the face of established competition. The network's lone breakout success that season was the groundbreaking late-night comedy/variety show, NBC's Saturday Night – which would be renamed Saturday Night Live in 1976, after the cancellation of a Howard Cosell-hosted program of the same title on ABC – which replaced reruns of The Tonight Show that previously aired in its Saturday time slot.

In 1978, Schlosser was promoted to executive vice president at RCA, and a desperate NBC lured Fred Silverman away from top-rated ABC to turn its fortunes around. With the notable exceptions of CHiPs, Barbara Mandrell and the Mandrell Sisters, Diff'rent Strokes (and its spin-off The Facts of Life), Real People, and the miniseries Shōgun, Silverman was unable to pull out a hit. Failures accumulated rapidly under his watch (such as Hello, Larry, Supertrain, Pink Lady and Jeff, The Krofft Superstar Hour, season six of Saturday Night Live, and The Waverly Wonders). Many of them were beaten in the ratings by shows that Silverman had greenlit during his previous tenures at CBS and ABC.

During this time, several longtime affiliates also defected from NBC in markets such as Atlanta (WSB-TV), Bakersfield (KERO-TV), Baltimore (WBAL-TV), Baton Rouge (WBRZ-TV), Billings (KTVQ), Brownsville (KRGV-TV), Charlotte (WSOC-TV), Columbia, Missouri (KOMU-TV), Dayton (WDTN), Decatur (WAAY-TV), El Dorado (KLAA), Eugene (KVAL-TV), Fargo (WDAY-TV), Fort Smith (KFSM-TV), Green Bay (WFRV-TV), Indianapolis (WRTV), Jacksonville (WTLV), Knoxville (WATE-TV), Marquette (WJMN-TV), Minneapolis-St. Paul (KSTP-TV), Medford (KTVL), Odessa (KMID), Panama City (WMBB), Rapid City (KOTA-TV), San Diego (KGTV), Savannah (WSAV-TV), Schenectady (WRGB), Sioux Falls (KSFY-TV), Temple (KCEN-TV), Tyler (KLTV), Waterbury (WATR-TV) and Wheeling (WTRF-TV). Most of these stations were wooed away by ABC, which had lifted out of last place to become the #1 network during the late 1970s and early 1980s, while WBAL-TV, KERO-TV, KFSM-TV, KTVQ KVAL-TV, KTVL, WRGB and WTRF-TV went to CBS and WATR-TV became an independent station under the new WTXX calls (it is now CW affiliate WCCT-TV); ABC had originally considered aligning with WBAL, but the station decided against it because ABC's evening newscasts had attracted ratings too dismal for them to consider doing so. Most of these defected from NBC were VHF stations, with some exceptions including WAAY-TV, WATR-TV, KLAA-TV and KERO, which are UHF stations (in case of both Huntsville and Bakersfield, it was since these cities lacked any sort of VHF stations). In the case of WSB-TV and WSOC-TV, which have both since become ABC affiliates, both stations were (and remain) under common ownership with Cox Media Group, with its other NBC affiliate at the time, WIIC-TV in Pittsburgh (which would become WPXI in 1981 and also remains owned by Cox), only staying with the network because WIIC-TV itself was a distant third to CBS-affiliated powerhouse KDKA-TV and ABC affiliate WTAE-TV and wouldn't be on par with those stations until the 1990s (KDKA-TV, owned at the time by Group W and now owned by CBS, infamously passed up affiliating with NBC after Westinghouse bought the station from DuMont in 1954, leading to an acrimonious relationship between NBC and Westinghouse that lasted for years afterward). In markets such as San Diego, Fort Smith, Charlotte, Knoxville and Jacksonville, NBC had little choice but to affiliate with a UHF station, with the San Diego station (KNSD) eventually becoming an NBC O&O, though in the case of Knoxville, it moved back to VHF in 1988 with the switch to then-CBS affiliate WBIR-TV. In Wheeling, NBC ultimately upgraded its affiliation when it partnered with WTOV-TV in nearby Steubenville, Ohio, overtaking former affiliate WTRF-TV in the ratings by a large margin. Other smaller television markets like Yuma, Arizona waited many years to get another local NBC affiliate (first with KIVA, and later KYMA). The stations in Baltimore, Columbia, Dayton, Jacksonville, Savannah, and Temple, however, have since rejoined the network, although El Dorado went to a full-time Fox affiliate after a long association with ABC, Green Bay switched to CBS several years after being associated with ABC, and Bakersfield, where it went to ABC several years after it was a CBS affiliate. In case of Rapid City, the KOTA calls now resist on a station owned by Gray Television.

After President Jimmy Carter pulled the U.S. team out of the 1980 Summer Olympics, NBC canceled a planned 150 hours of coverage (which had cost $87 million for the broadcast rights), placing the network's future in doubt. It had been counting on the broadcasts to help promote its new fall shows, and had been estimated to pull in $170 million in advertising revenue.

The press was merciless towards Silverman, but the two most savage attacks on his leadership came from within the network. The company that composed the promotional theme for NBC's "Proud as a Peacock" image campaign created a parody song called "Loud as a Peacock", which was broadcast on Don Imus' program on WNBC radio in New York. Its lyrics blamed Silverman for the network's problems ("The Peacock's dead, so thank you, Fred"). An angered Silverman ordered all remaining copies of the spoof destroyed, though technology eventually allowed its wide propagation to the Internet in later generations from a few remaining copies. Saturday Night Live writer and occasional performer Al Franken satirized Silverman in a sketch on the program titled "A Limo For a Lame-O", where he presented a chart with the top-10 rated programs for that season and commented that there was "not one N" on the list. Silverman later admitted he "never liked Al Franken to begin with", and the sketch ruined Franken's chance of succeeding Lorne Michaels as executive producer of SNL following his 1980 departure (with the position going to Jean Doumanian, who was fired after one season following declining ratings and negative critical reviews. Michaels would later return to the show in 1985).

=== Tartikoff's turnaround ===
Fred Silverman eventually resigned as entertainment president in the summer of 1981. Grant Tinker, a highly regarded producer who co-founded MTM Enterprises with his former wife Mary Tyler Moore, became the president of the network while Brandon Tartikoff became the president of the entertainment division. Tartikoff inherited a schedule full of aging dramas and very few sitcoms, but showed patience with promising programs. One such show was the critically acclaimed Hill Street Blues, which suffered from poor ratings during its first season. Rather than canceling the show, he moved the Emmy Award-winning police drama from Steven Bochco to Thursdays, where its ratings improved dramatically. He used the same tactics with St. Elsewhere and Cheers. Shows like these were able to get the same ad revenue as their higher-rated competition because of their desirable demographics, upscale adults ages 18–34. While the network claimed moderate successes with Gimme a Break!, Silver Spoons, Knight Rider, and Remington Steele, its biggest hit during this period was The A-Team, which, at 10th place, was the network's only program to rank in the Nielsen Top-20 for the 1982–83 season, and ascended to fourth place the following year. These shows helped NBC through the disastrous 1983–84 season, which saw none of its nine new fall shows gaining a second year, with only three mid-season entries –Night Court, Riptide and Double Trouble– returning for the following season.

In February 1982, NBC canceled Tom Snyder's The Tomorrow Show and gave the 12:35 a.m. time slot to 34-year-old comedian David Letterman. Though Letterman was unsuccessful with his weekday morning talk show effort for the network (which debuted on June 23, 1980), Late Night with David Letterman proved much more successful, lasting for 11 years and serving as the launching pad for another late-night talk franchise that continues to this day.

In 1984, the huge success of Bill Cosby's The Cosby Show led to a renewed interest in sitcoms, while Family Ties and Cheers, both of which premiered in 1982 to mediocre ratings (the latter ranking at near dead last among all network shows during the 1982–83 season), saw their viewership increase from having Cosby as a lead-in. The network rose from third place to second in the ratings during the 1984–85 season, which also saw the premieres of Highway to Heaven, Miami Vice and Hunter; and finally reached first place in 1985–86, alongside the debuts of The Golden Girls, 227 and The Hogan Family. In 1986, Bob Wright was appointed as chairman of NBC. The network's upswing continued late into the decade with L.A. Law, ALF, Amen, Matlock, A Different World, Empty Nest, Unsolved Mysteries and In the Heat of the Night.

In 1985, NBC became the first American television network to broadcast programs in stereo. NBC started repairing its old affiliations that were previously wooed by ABC, such as Savannah, Temple and Columbia, followed by Jacksonville in 1988. It also repaired WOWT, a station formerly affiliated with CBS, in 1986.

In the fall of 1987, taking a page from its affiliate KCRA-TV's attempt at a daily checkerboard schedule of first-run comedies in the Prime Time Access hour a year earlier, NBC decided to launch a similar block and contracted with Paramount Television, Lorimar-Telepictures, LBS Communications, MCA Television, and MGM Television to produce five series for what it was calling "Prime Time Begins at 7:30". Each series was to air one episode per week on a designated day. Airing Monday was Marblehead Manor, starring Bob Fraser as an eccentric businessman and the daily dealings inside his mansion. She's the Sheriff aired Tuesdays and was intended to serve as a comeback vehicle for Suzanne Somers, who played the widow of a Nevada county sheriff who was chosen to succeed him. Wednesdays featured You Can't Take It with You, an adaptation of the stage play starring Harry Morgan as Grandpa Vanderhof. Out of This World aired on Thursdays and featured Maureen Flannigan as a teenager born to an alien father and human mother that develops supernatural abilities on her 13th birthday. A revival of the short-lived 1983 NBC series We Got It Made, which had been cancelled after one year, closed out the week on Fridays and was part of an ongoing trend in which former network series were revived in first-run syndication.

The package was aimed at attracting viewers to NBC stations in the half-hour preceding prime time (8:00 p.m. in the Eastern and Pacific Time Zones, 7:00 p.m. elsewhere), and was conceived as a result of the FCC's loosening of the Prime Time Access Rule, legislation passed in 1971 that required networks to turn over the 7:30 p.m. (Eastern) time slot to local stations to program local or syndicated content; and the relaxation of the Financial Interest and Syndication Rules, which had prevented networks from producing content from their own syndication units to fill the void. The shows that were part of the package were regularly outrated in many markets by such syndicated game shows as Wheel of Fortune, Jeopardy!, and Hollywood Squares. Marblehead Manor, We Got It Made and You Can't Take It With You were cancelled at the end of the 1987–88 season, with She's the Sheriff lasting one more season in weekend syndication before its cancellation. Out of This World ran for three additional seasons, airing mainly on weekends, and was the most successful of the five series.

That year, in 1987, NBC planned to increase output of in-house productions for the next year, such as a series of half-hour dramedies, and made an experimental sitcom lineup for Thanksgiving weekend (November 29) that would consist of four sitcoms on the lineup, which consists of Night Court, Beverly Hills Buntz, Family Ties and My Two Dads, and the low ratings for NBC's daytime lineup caused by the creation of the new soap opera that was set for spring 1988, Generations. At the same time, NBC confirmed its plans to integrate its NBC Enterprises division with NBC-TV and Corporate Communications, with Enterprises merchandising and foreign sales becoming part of NBC-TV and guest relations and studio tours were added to the Corporate Communications branch, and a new operation service, NBC Operations & Services was created.

NBC aired the first of nine consecutive Summer Olympic Games broadcasts when it covered the 1988 Games in Seoul, South Korea. The 1988–89 season saw NBC have an astounding 17 series in Nielsen's year-end Top 30 most-watched network programs; it also ranked at first place in the weekly ratings for more than 12 months, an unprecedented achievement that has not been duplicated since. 1989 however, also served as NBC's final year of covering Major League Baseball (the primary package would move over to CBS for the next four years before NBC regained the rights), having done so in some shape or form since 1947. The 1989–90 season, became NBC's third season (after the fall seasons of 1975 and 1983) which saw none of its seven new fall shows gaining a second year (one of them, Baywatch, became increasingly popular when it began airing in first-run syndication). Nevertheless, the network continued its hot streak into the early 1990s with new hits such as The Fresh Prince of Bel-Air, Blossom, and Law & Order.

=== "Must See TV" ===
In 1991, Tartikoff left his role as NBC's President of Entertainment to take an executive position at Paramount Pictures. In the course of a decade, he had taken control of a network with no shows in the Nielsen Top 10 and left it with five. Tartikoff was succeeded by Warren Littlefield, whose first years as entertainment president proved shaky as a result of most of the Tartikoff-era hits ending their runs. Some blamed Littlefield for losing David Letterman to CBS after naming Jay Leno as the successor to Johnny Carson on The Tonight Show, following the latter's retirement as host in May 1992. Things turned around with the launches of new hit series such as Mad About You, Wings, Sisters, Frasier, Friends, ER, In the House, For Your Love and Will & Grace.

One of Tartikoff's late acquisitions, Seinfeld initially struggled from its debut in 1989 as a summer series, but grew to become one of NBC's top-rated shows after it was moved to Thursdays in the time slot following Cheers. Seinfeld ended its run in 1998, becoming the latest overall television program in the United States to end its final season as the leader in the Nielsen ratings for a single television season. Only two other shows had finished their runs at the top of the ratings, I Love Lucy and The Andy Griffith Show. Consequently, Friends emerged as NBC's biggest television show after the 1998 Seinfeld final broadcast. It dominated the ratings, never leaving the top five watched shows of the year from its second through tenth seasons and landing on the number-one spot during season eight in the 2001–02 season as the latest sitcom in the United States to lead the annual Nielsen primetime television ratings. Cheers spinoff Frasier became a critical and commercial success, usually landing in the Nielsen Top 20 – although its ratings were overshadowed to a minor extent by Friends – and went on to win numerous Emmy Awards (eventually setting a record for a sitcom that lasted until it was overtaken by Modern Family in 2014). In 1994, NBC began branding its strong Thursday night lineup, mainly in reference to the comedies airing in the first two hours, under the "Must See TV" tagline (which during the mid- and late 1990s, was also applied to NBC's comedy blocks on other nights, particularly on Tuesdays).

Between September 1994 and September 1996, NBC would affiliate with several stations that were affected by the 1994–96 United States broadcast TV realignment, which was triggered as a result of Fox's acquisition of rights to the NFL in December 1993. Several of those stations, including WBAL-TV, WHDH (Boston), and WCAU (Philadelphia), were involved in an affiliation deal between Westinghouse Broadcasting and CBS, KSHB-TV (Kansas City), which is one of the stations involved in an affiliation deal between New World Communications and Fox, WCBD-TV (Charleston), which was involved in an affiliation deal between Allbritton Communications and ABC and WGBA-TV (Green Bay), WPMI-TV (Mobile) and KHNL (Honolulu), which was part of an agreement between Fox and SF Broadcasting.

By the mid-1990s, NBC's sports division, headed by Dick Ebersol, had rights to three of the four major professional sports leagues (the NFL, Major League Baseball and the NBA), the Olympics, and the national powerhouse Notre Dame Fighting Irish football team. The NBA on NBC enjoyed great success in the 1990s due in large part to the Chicago Bulls' run of six championships at the hands of superstar Michael Jordan. However, NBC Sports would suffer a major blow in 1998, when it lost the rights to the American Football Conference (AFC) to CBS, which itself had lost rights to the National Football Conference (NFC) to Fox four years earlier; the deal stripped NBC of National Football League (NFL) game telecasts after 59 years and AFC games after 36 years (dating back to its existence as the American Football League prior to its 1970 merger with the NFL).

Littlefield left NBC in 1998 to pursue a career as a television and film producer, with the network subsequently going through three entertainment presidents in three years. Littlefield was replaced as president of NBC Entertainment by Scott Sassa, who oversaw the development of such shows as The West Wing, Law & Order: Special Victims Unit and Fear Factor. After Sassa was reassigned to NBC's West Coast Division, Garth Ancier was named as his replacement in 1999. Jeff Zucker then succeeded Ancier as president of NBC Entertainment in 2000.

=== New century, new problems ===
At the start of the 2000s, NBC's fortunes started to take a rapid turn for the worse. That year, NBC's longstanding ratings lead ended as CBS (which had languished in the ratings after losing the NFL) overtook it for first place. In 2001, CBS chose to move its hit reality series Survivor to serve as the anchor of its Thursday night lineup. Its success was taken as a suggestion that NBC's nearly two decades of dominance on Thursday nights could be broken; even so, the strength of Friends, Will & Grace, ER and Just Shoot Me! (the latter of which saw its highest viewership following its move to that night in the 2000–01 season) helped NBC continue to lead the Thursday ratings. Between the 2001–02 and 2004–05 seasons, NBC became the first major network to air select dramas in letterbox over its analog broadcast feed; the move was done in the hopes of attracting new viewers, although NBC saw only a slight boost. Overall, NBC retook its first-place lead that year, and spent much of the next four years (with the exception of the 2002–03 season, when it was briefly jumped again by CBS for first) in the top spot.

On the other hand, NBC was stripped of the broadcast rights to two other major sports leagues: it lost Major League Baseball to Fox after the 2000 season (by that point, NBC only had alternating rights to the All-Star Game, League Championship Series and World Series), and, later, the NBA to ABC after the 2001–02 season. After losing the NBA rights, NBC's major sports offerings were reduced to the Olympics (which in 2002, expanded to include rights to the Winter Olympics, as part of a contract that gave it the U.S. television rights to both the Summer and Winter Olympics through 2012), PGA Tour golf events and a floundering Notre Dame football program (however, it would eventually acquire the rights to the National Hockey League in May 2004).

In October 2001, NBC acquired Spanish-language network Telemundo from Liberty Media and Sony Pictures Entertainment for $2.7 billion, beating out other bidders including CBS/Viacom. The deal was finalized in 2002. In 2002, NBC marked its 75th anniversary; the milestone was marked with a three-hour 75th Anniversary Celebration special in May 2002, which featured appearances by network stars and personalities.

In 2004, French entertainment conglomerate Vivendi Universal sold 80% of its film and television subsidiary, Vivendi Universal Entertainment, to NBC's parent company, General Electric, integrating the network with Vivendi Universal's various properties (Universal Pictures film studio, Canal+ television networks, and Universal Parks & Resorts) upon completion of the merger of the two companies under the combined NBC Universal brand. NBC Universal was then owned 80% by General Electric and 20% by Vivendi. Zucker was promoted to the newly created position of president of NBC Universal Television Group. Kevin Reilly became the new president of NBC Entertainment.

In 2004, NBC experienced a three on a match scenario—Friends and Frasier ended their runs; Jerry Orbach, who had played Lennie Briscoe in its hit Law & Order, died suddenly later that year)—and shortly afterward was left with several moderately rated shows and few true hits. In particular, Friends spin-off Joey, despite a relatively strong start, started to falter in the ratings during its second season.

In December 2005, NBC began its first week-long primetime game show event, Deal or No Deal; the series garnered high ratings, and became a weekly series in March 2006. Otherwise, the 2005–06 season was one of the worst for NBC in three decades, with only one fall series, the sitcom My Name Is Earl, surviving for a second season; the sole remaining anchor of the "Must See TV" lineup, Will & Grace also saw its ratings decline. That season, NBC's ratings fell to fourth place, behind a resurgent ABC, Fox (which would eventually become the most-watched U.S. broadcast network in the 2007–08 season), and top-rated CBS (which led for much of the remainder of the decade). During this time, all of the networks faced audience erosion from increased competition by satellite television, home video, video games, and the Internet, with NBC being the hardest hit.

The 2006–07 season was a mixed bag for NBC, with Deal or No Deal remaining strong and Heroes becoming a surprise hit on Monday nights, while the highly touted Studio 60 on the Sunset Strip (from West Wing creator Aaron Sorkin) lost a third of its premiere-night viewers by Week 6 and was eventually canceled; two critically acclaimed sitcoms, The Office and 30 Rock, also pulled in modest successes and went on to win the Emmy Award for Outstanding Comedy Series for four consecutive years. The network also regained the rights to the NFL after eight years that season when it acquired the Sunday Night Football package from ESPN (as part of a deal that also saw Monday Night Football move to ESPN from ABC). However, despite this, NBC remained at a very distant fourth place, barely ranking ahead of The CW.

However, NBC did experience success with its summer schedule, despite its declining ratings during the main broadcast season. America's Got Talent, a reality talent competition series that premiered in 2006, earned a 4.6 rating in the 18–49 demographic, higher than that earned by the 2002 premiere of Fox's American Idol. Got Talent (which is the flagship of an international talent competition franchise) would continue to garner unusually high ratings throughout its summer run. However, NBC decided not to place it in the spring season, and instead use it as a platform to promote their upcoming fall shows.

Following the unexpected termination of Kevin Reilly, in 2007, Ben Silverman was appointed president of NBC Entertainment, while Jeff Zucker was promoted to succeed Bob Wright as CEO of NBC. The network failed to generate any new primetime hits during the 2008–09 season (despite the rare good fortune of having the rights to both the Super Bowl and the Summer Olympics in which to promote their new programming slate), the sitcom Parks and Recreation survived for a second season after a six-episode first season, while Heroes and Deal or No Deal both collapsed in the ratings and were later canceled (with a revamped Deal or No Deal being revived for one additional season in syndication). In a March 2009 interview, Zucker had stated that he no longer believed it would be possible for NBC to become #1 in prime time. Ben Silverman left the network in 2009, with Jeff Gaspin replacing him as president of NBC Entertainment.

=== Comcast era (2011–present) ===
On December 3, 2009, Comcast announced they would purchase a 51% controlling stake in NBC Universal from GE (which would retain the remaining 49%) for $6.5 billion in cash and $9.1 billion in raised debt. GE used $5.8 billion from the deal to buy out Vivendi's 20% interest in NBC Universal.

NBC's broadcast of the 2010 Winter Olympics in Vancouver, in February of that year, generated a ratings increase of 21% over its broadcast of the 2006 Winter Games in Torino. NBC was criticized for repeatedly showing footage of a crash occurring during practice for an Olympic luge competition that killed Georgian luger Nodar Kumaritashvili. NBC News president Steve Capus ordered the footage not to be shown without his permission and Olympics prime time host Bob Costas promised on-air that the video would not be shown again during the Games. NBC Universal was on track to lose $250 million in advertising revenue on that year's Winter Olympics, failing to make up the $820 million it paid for the U.S. television rights. Even so, with its continuing position in fourth place (although it virtually tied with ABC in many demographics on the strength of NBC's sports broadcasts that year), the 2009–10 season ended with only two scripted shows – Community and Parenthood, as well as three unscripted shows – The Marriage Ref, Who Do You Think You Are? and Minute to Win It – being renewed for second seasons, while other series such as Heroes and veteran crime drama Law & Order (the latter of which ended after 20 seasons, tying it with Gunsmoke as the longest-running prime time drama in U.S. television history, until it was revived in 2022) were cancelled.

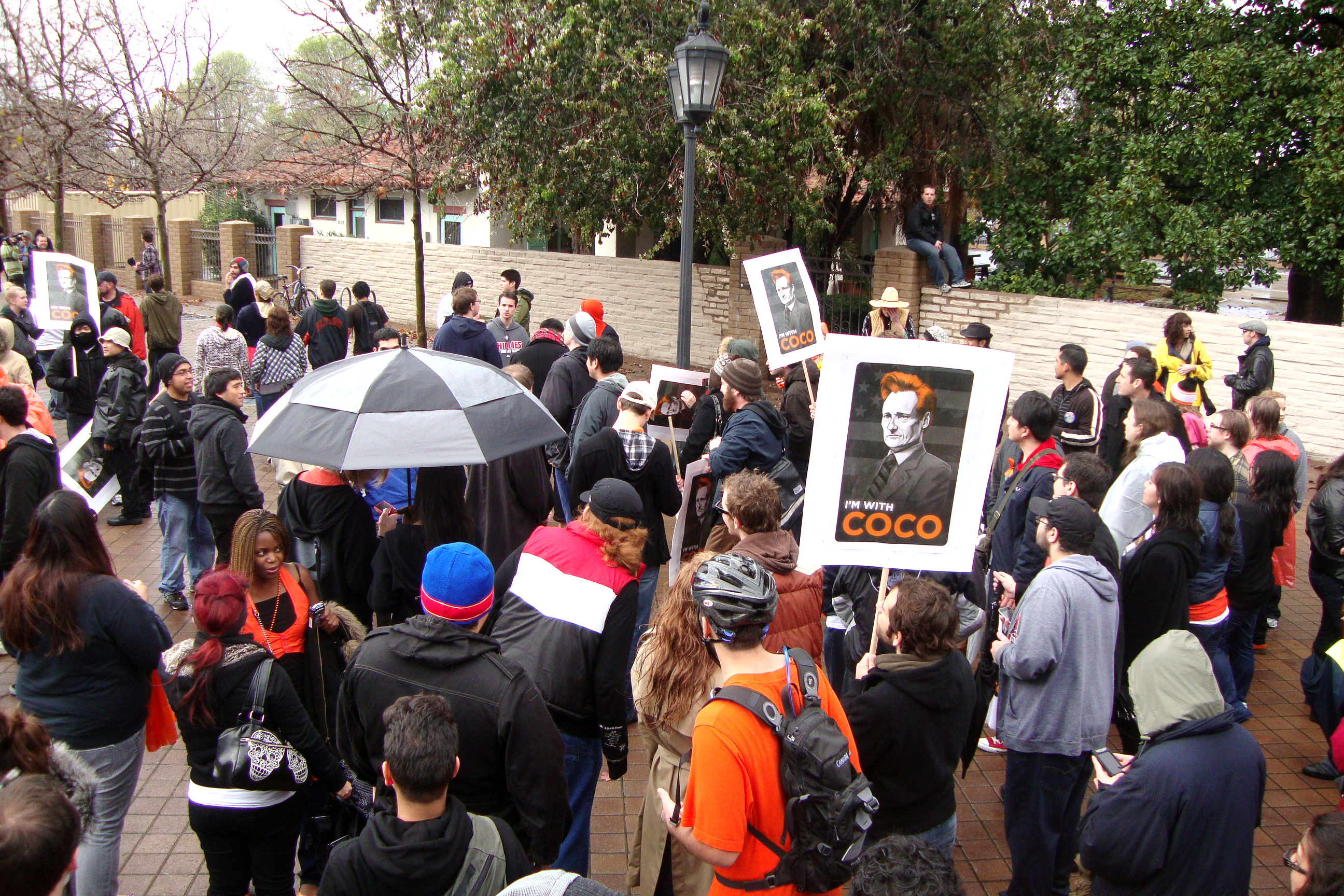
Supporters of Conan O'Brien's hosting duties at The Tonight Show stage a protest outside Universal Studios in Los Angeles

After Conan O'Brien succeeded Jay Leno as host of The Tonight Show in 2009, NBC gave Leno a new prime time talk show, committing to air it every weeknight at 10:00 p.m. Eastern and Pacific as an inexpensive comedic alternative to the police procedurals and other hour-long dramas typically aired in that time slot. In doing so, NBC became the first major U.S. broadcast network in decades, if ever, to broadcast the same program in a week daily prime time strip. Its executives called the decision "a transformational moment in the history of broadcasting" and "in effect, launching five shows." Conversely, industry executives criticized the network for abandoning a history of airing quality dramas in the 10:00 hour, and expressed concern that it would hurt NBC by undermining a reputation built on successful scripted series. Citing complaints from many affiliates, which saw their late-evening newscasts drop significantly in the local ratings during The Jay Leno Show's run, NBC announced on January 10, 2010, that it would drop Leno's show from the 10:00 p.m. slot, with Zucker announcing plans to shift the program (which would have been reduced to a half-hour) into the 11:35 p.m. slot and shift its existing late night lineup (including The Tonight Show) by 30 minutes. The removal of The Jay Leno Show from its prime time schedule had almost no impact on NBC's ratings. The increases NBC experienced in the 2010–11 season compared to 2009–10 were almost entirely attributable to the rising viewership of NBC Sunday Night Football. By 2012, the shows that occupied the 10:00 p.m. time slot drew lower numbers than The Jay Leno Show did when it aired in that hour two years before. In the spring of 2010, cable provider and multimedia firm Comcast announced it would acquire a majority interest in NBC Universal from General Electric, which would retain a minority stake in the company in the interim.

On September 24, 2010, Jeff Zucker announced that he would step down as NBC Universal's CEO once the company's merger with Comcast was completed at the end of the year. After the deal was finalized, Steve Burke was named CEO of NBCUniversal and Robert Greenblatt replaced Jeff Gaspin as chairman of NBC Entertainment. In 2011, NBC was finally able to find a breakout hit in the midseason reality singing competition series The Voice. Otherwise, NBC had another tough season, with every single new fall program getting cancelled by season's end – the fourth time this has happened to NBC after the fall seasons of 1975, 1983 and 1989 – and the midseason legal drama Harry's Law being its only freshman scripted series to be renewed for the 2011–12 season. NBC nearly completed its full conversion to an all-HD schedule (outside of the Saturday morning time slot leased by the Qubo consortium, which NBCUniversal would rescind its stake in the following year) on September 20, 2011, when Last Call with Carson Daly converted to the format with the premiere of its 11th season.

The 2011–12 season was another tough season for NBC. On the upside, NBC's broadcast of Super Bowl XLVI was the most-watched program in U.S. television history at the time, and NBC's Monday night midseason lineup of The Voice and musical-drama Smash was very successful. NBC managed to lift itself into third place in the 18–49 demographic in the 2011–12 season, primarily on the strength of those three programs (Sunday Night Football, The Voice, and Smash), breaking NBC's eight-year streak in fourth place. Four shows survived for a second season, but three of them (including Smash) were cancelled in the following year, none were unqualified ratings successes, and NBC remained a distant fourth place in total viewership.

In the fall of 2012, NBC greatly expanded its sitcom roster, with eight comedy series airing on Tuesday, Wednesday and Thursday nights. NBC bounced back to first place network in adults 18–49 that fall, boosted by the new season of The Voice, the initial success of freshman drama Revolution and sitcom Go On, and the continued strength of Sunday Night Football. However, after withholding the new season of The Voice and benching Revolution until late March, NBC's midseason ratings suffered, falling to fifth place behind Spanish-language network Univision during the February sweeps period. The 2012–13 season ended with NBC finishing in third place overall, albeit by a narrow margin, with only three new shows, all dramas, surviving for a second season (Revolution, Hannibal, and Chicago Fire, with the latter becoming a breakout hit, leading to the creation of another successful franchise).

In 2013, NBC Sports migrated its business and production operations (including NBCSN) to new facilities in Stamford, Connecticut. Production of the network's NFL pre-game show Football Night in America remained at the NBC Studios at Rockefeller Center (with production operations based in Studio 8G, while the program itself was broadcast in Studio 8H, the longtime home of Saturday Night Live), until it migrated to the Stamford facility in September 2014. Despite the failure of another highly advertised game show event, The Million Second Quiz, the 2013–14 season was mostly successful for NBC due to the continued success of The Voice, Chicago Fire, Revolution, Sunday Night Football and Grimm. Along with new hits including The Blacklist, Hannibal and Chicago PD −the first spin-off in the Chicago franchise– and a significant ratings boost from its broadcast of the 2014 Winter Olympics, NBC became the No. 1 network in the coveted 18–49 demographic that season for the first time since the 2003–04 season, when Friends ended. NBC also improved considerably in total viewership, finishing behind long-dominant CBS in second place for the season.

The 2014–15 season was something of a mixed bag for NBC, but still successful. NBC launched eight new series that year, with only one, comedy-drama police procedural The Mysteries of Laura, being renewed for a second season. Nevertheless, the network continued to experience success with most of its returning series, especially The Blacklist (despite a modest decline in viewership following its move to Thursdays midway through the season, due partly to an initial weak lead-in from miniseries The Slap). Combined with the record number of viewers tuning in to Super Bowl XLIX, NBC again finished #1 in the 18–49 demographic and in second place overall.

The 2015–16 season was successful for NBC, with the successful launch of the new drama Blindspot premiering after The Voice, then subsequently being renewed for a second season in November 2015. NBC also continued with the success with the Chicago franchise with launching its third spin-off Chicago Med, which also received an early second season pick up in February 2016. Thursday nights continues to be a struggle for NBC, with continued success with the third season of The Blacklist brought the failed launch of Heroes Reborn which was cancelled in January 2016, and thriller The Player; however, NBC found success with police procedural Shades of Blue, which improved in its timeslot and was renewed for a second season in February 2016. On the comedy side, NBC surprisingly found success in the new workplace sitcom Superstore which premiered as a "preview" after The Voice in November 2015, and officially launched in January 2016 which brought decent ratings for a new comedy without The Voice as a lead-in and which was subsequently renewed for a second season in February 2016. The 2016–17 season brought more success for NBC with the premiere of comedy-drama This Is Us, which was well received by critics and ratings and was renewed for two additional seasons in January 2017. The Blacklist continued to bring in modest ratings, but it brought the failed launch of its spinoff The Blacklist: Redemption. NBC tried to expand the Chicago franchise with a fourth spinoff titled Chicago Justice, but the show was canceled after a single season of 13 episodes. On the comedy side, workplace sitcom Superstore continued success in its second season. NBC launched new fantasy sitcom The Good Place following The Voice and brought in modest ratings and was renewed for a second season in January 2017. Another highlight of the 2016–17 season was The Wall, which premiered to modest ratings and would air in the summer time period prior to the 2017–18 season.

The 2017–18 season brought continued success for NBC with the premiere of Ellen's Game of Games and the return of Will & Grace, the latter of which previously aired its final episode in 2006. The 2018–19 season would continue NBC's success with the premieres of The Titan Games, Manifest, Songland, and New Amsterdam, all of which would be renewed for additional seasons; however, The Village and The Enemy Within would not make it past their first seasons. NBC's dominance of the 2010s would fade during the 2019–20 season, when the COVID-19 pandemic caused a major disruption in production of NBC's programming. The pandemic caused the IOC and the Japanese government to reach an agreement to postpone the 2020 Summer Olympics to the summer of 2021, resulting in NBC having to rely on alternative programming for the summer of 2020. Before the 2022–23 season, it was reported that NBC had considered the possibility of cutting its primetime programming to two hours.

The 2022–23 season saw the series premieres of their new multi-camera comedies Lopez vs Lopez on November 4, 2022 and the 2023 revival of Night Court on January 17, 2023. The 2024–25 season saw the series premieres of their new comedies Happy's Place on October 18, 2024 and St. Denis Medical on November 12, 2024.

Ever since the 2020s began, NBC had finished second in overall viewership on the Nielsen ratings (only behind CBS) at the end of the 2020–21, the 2021–22, the 2022–23, the 2023–24 and the 2024–25 seasons.

NBC 100th anniversary logo

In May 2025 during the NBCUniversal upfronts, the company announced plans to mark NBC's centennial anniversary in 2026. Tina Fey and Amy Poehler revealed plans for a commemorative variety special that would feature "memorable music performances, comedy tributes, behind the scenes stories and surprise reunions" (with Fey jokingly suggesting it should be twice as long as the Saturday Night Live 50th anniversary special because NBC was twice as old as SNL).

The 2025–26 season saw a major expansion to professional sports programming on NBC; the network relaunched the NBA on NBC under a new 11-year contract that includes Tuesday-night games throughout the regular season, a package of Sunday Night Basketball games following the conclusion of the NFL season, and selected playoff games. Major League Baseball also returned to NBC in the 2026 season under a three-year deal, with NBC airing Sunday Night Baseball and Wild Card Series games. NBC officially launched its centennial campaign, "A Century Together", in February 2026, with two promos premiering during the 2026 Winter Olympics opening ceremony ("Kinetic") and Super Bowl LX ("In My Life") respectively, highlighting programming and personalities across its history. A three-hour centennial special was announced during the 2026 NBCUniversal upfronts, which will be broadcast on December 10, 2026 from the Dolby Theatre.

At the conclusion of the 2025–26 television season—boosted by the viewership of the Olympics and Super Bowl LX—NBC finished first in overall, 18–49, and 25–54 viewership among the major networks for the first time since 2001–02, ending a 17-season streak by CBS.

On June 29, 2026, Comcast announced that it would spin-off NBCUniversal (including NBC) into a new publicly traded company with Comcast's co-CEO Mike Cavanaugh as CEO.
