= List of United States radio networks =

The following is a list of radio broadcasters and radio networks in the United States.

== Table of broadcasters and networks ==
=== Major English-language commercial broadcasters and networks ===
Broadcaster	Networks
iHeartMedia	Premiere Networks; Total Traffic and Weather Network; 24/7 News; NBC News Radio (as distributor; operated by NBC News); Black Information Network
Cumulus Media	Nash FM; Westwood One; Dial Global Local; NBC Sports Radio
Audacy, Inc.	Sabres Hockey Network; New York Yankees Radio; Westwood One Sports (also produced and distributed by Westwood One)
Townsquare Media	Michigan Talk Network
Educational Media Foundation	Air1; K-Love; K-Love Classics
Hubbard Broadcasting	Hubbard Radio Network

=== Other commercial radio broadcasters and networks ===
- American Urban Radio Networks
- Associated Press Radio Network
- Bloomberg Radio
  - Lifestyle Talk Radio Network
- Cable Radio Network
- Clear Media Network
- Chinese Radio Network (Mandarin)
- Compass Media Networks
- Envision Networks
- ESPN, Inc.
  - ESPN Radio
    - ESPN Deportes Radio
- Genesis Communications Network
- Gen Media Partners
  - HRN Media (Hispanic/ Multi-Cultural Radio Network)
  - Sun Broadcast Group
- IMG Worldwide
  - IMG College Audio Network (consisting of 76 individual radio networks)
    - ISP Sports
- Indianapolis Motor Speedway Radio Network
- MRN Radio (Motor Racing Network)
- MannGroup Radio Services
- Music of Your Life (formerly distributed by Jones Radio Network)
- Northern Broadcasting System
- NowCast Weather Radio Network
- Performance Racing Network
- Progressive Radio Network
- Radio America
- RadioLinx Broadcast Marketing
- Reach Media
- Rockcastle Media Networks
- Salem Media Group
  - Salem Radio Network
- Skyview Networks
  - ABC News Radio
- Spanish Broadcasting System
- Sports Byline USA
- Sports Radio America
- Superadio
- Syndication Networks
- Talk Media Network
- Talk Radio Network
- Tom Kent Radio Network
- United Stations Radio Networks
- Uforia Audio Network (Spanish-language radio network, owned by Univision)
- USA Radio Network

=== State commercial networks ===
- Alabama Radio Network, a subsidiary of iHeartMedia.
- Arizona News Radio, a subsidiary of Skyview Networks.
- Arkansas Radio Network, a subsidiary of Cumulus Media
- California Headline News, a subsidiary of Skyview Networks
- Cowboy State News Network, a subsidiary of Montgomery Broadcasting L.L.C. (owner of KFBC in Cheyenne, WY)
- Florida News Network, a subsidiary of iHeartMedia.
- Georgia News Network, a subsidiary of iHeartMedia.
- Illinois Radio Network, a subsidiary of the Franklin Center for Government and Public Integrity.
- Network Indiana, a subsidiary of Emmis Communications.
- Radio Iowa, a subsidiary of Learfield Communications.
- Kansas Information Network, a subsidiary of Morris Communications.
- Kansas Agriculture Network, a subsidiary of Morris Communications.
- Kentucky News Network, a subsidiary of iHeartMedia.
- Louisiana Radio Network.
- Michigan Media Network.
- Michigan Talk Network, a subsidiary of Townsquare Media.
- Millennium News Network (serving New Jersey), a subsidiary of WKXW.
- Minnesota News Network, a subsidiary of Learfield Communications.
- Mississippi News Network, a subsidiary of TeleSouth Communications.
- Missouri Net, a subsidiary of Learfield Communications.
- Northern News Network of Montana, a subsidiary of Northern Broadcasting System.
- Nebraska Radio Network, a subsidiary of Learfield Communications.
- North Carolina News Network, a subsidiary of Curtis Media Group.
- Dakota News Network of North and South Dakota, a subsidiary of Midwest Information Systems.
- Ohio News Network, a subsidiary of Dispatch Broadcast Group.
- Oklahoma News Network, a subsidiary of iHeartMedia.
- Radio Oklahoma Network, a subsidiary of Griffin Communications
- Radio PA Networks of Pennsylvania, a subsidiary of WITF Enterprises.
- South Carolina Radio Network, a subsidiary of Learfield Communications.
- Tennessee Radio Networks, a subsidiary of iHeartMedia.
- Texas State Network, a subsidiary of Entercom.
- Virginia News Network, a subsidiary of iHeartMedia.
- MetroNews Radio Network of West Virginia, a subsidiary of West Virginia Radio Corporation.
- Wisconsin Radio Network, a subsidiary of Learfield Communications.

== Non-commercial broadcasters ==
- National Public Radio
- Native Voice 1
- Public Radio International
- Pacifica Network
- Radio Bilingüe (Spanish language)
- Northwest Community Radio Network
- American Public Media
- WRN Broadcast
- Public Radio Exchange
- Heartland Public Radio
- WFMT Radio Network

=== National government broadcasters ===
- American Forces Network (information/entertainment, for members of the U.S. military deployed abroad)
- NOAA Weather Radio All Hazards (information, for U.S. listeners)
- Radio Free Asia (For Asian listeners)
- Radio Free Europe/Radio Liberty (For Eastern European listeners)
- Radio Martí (For Cuban listeners)
- Radio Sawa (information/entertainment, for Middle East listeners)
- Voice of America (information/entertainment, for worldwide listeners)
- WWV Time Service (information, for U.S. and worldwide listeners)

=== Public radio state networks ===
- Alaska Public Radio Network
- Capital Public Radio Network
- CMU Public Radio (Michigan)
- Connecticut Public Radio
- ETV (South Carolina Public Radio Network)
- GPB Radio
- High Plains Public Radio
- Independent Public Radio (Minnesota)
- Indiana Public Radio
- Iowa Public Radio
- Jefferson Public Radio (southern Oregon/northern California)
- Kansas Public Radio
- Maine Public Broadcasting Network
- Minnesota Public Radio
- Montana Public Radio
- New Hampshire Public Radio
- New Jersey Public Radio (Northern/Central New Jersey; operated by New York Public Radio)
- North Carolina Public Radio
- Northeast Public Radio
- Ohio Public Radio
- Oregon Public Broadcasting
- Prairie Public (North Dakota)
- South Carolina Public Radio
- South Dakota Public Radio
- Utah Public Radio
- Vermont Public Radio
- Wisconsin Public Radio
- West Virginia Public Radio
- Wyoming Public Radio
- Yellowstone Public Radio

== Religious broadcasters ==
- American Family Radio
- Bible Broadcasting Network
- Bott Radio Network
- Calvary Radio Network
- Christian FM Media Group
- CSN International (formerly Calvary Satellite Network)
- CDR Radio Network
- Edgewater Broadcasting Network
- EMF Broadcasting (Educational Media Foundation)
  - Air 1
  - K-LOVE
- EWTN Radio
- Family Life Communications
- Family Life Network
- Family Radio
- Flavor Radio Network
- Fundamental Broadcasting Network
- Immanuel Broadcasting Network
- Mars Hill Network
- Moody Radio
- Pilgrim Radio
- Pillar of Fire, Intl.
- Radio 74 Internationale
- Radio Maria
- Redeemer Broadcasting
- Relevant Radio
- Sheridan Gospel Network
- Smile FM (Michigan)
- Sound of Life Radio
- Three Angels Broadcasting Network (3ABN Radio Network)
- 3ABN Latino Radio Network (Spanish-language Christian radio, owned by 3ABN)
- 3ABN Radio Music Channel (Christian music radio, owned by 3ABN)
- USA Radio Network
- VCY America Radio Network

== Former networks ==
- ABC News & Talk
- Accent Radio Network
- Air America Radio
- Amalgamated Broadcasting System
- Broadcast Programming Incorporated (now owned by Dial Global)
- CBN Northeast (an arm of the Christian Broadcasting Network)
- CBS News Radio
- Dial Global (now named Westwood One)
- Drake-Chenault (now owned by Dial Global)
- Don Lee Network (based on the West Coast; was considered one of the largest regional radio networks during radio's golden age next to the Yankee Network in New England, the Texas State Network, the Intermountain Network in the Mountain West, the Michigan Radio Network in the Midwest (centering on Michigan), the Colonial Network in New England, and the McClatchy Regional Network in Central California and Nevada).
- Enterprise Radio Network
- For the People Radio Network
- I.E. America Radio Network
- Independent Broadcasters Network
- Jones Radio Networks (now owned by Dial Global)
- Keystone Broadcasting System (a.k.a. KBS; Established in 1940 by advertising executive Michael M. Sillerman; operated as a "transcription network" - rather than using expensive AT&T telephone lines to broadcast live simultaneously, it mailed popular music & other radio shows, like Burns and Allen and Lum and Abner, on high-quality, pre-recorded 33⅓ rpm discs to its affiliates; despite having close to 1,000 affiliated stations at its peak, was considered a close rival to the Liberty & Progressive Broadcasting Systems in competing with the "Big Four" radio networks: NBC, CBS, ABC, & Mutual; was considered a fifth national radio network alongside the Liberty & Progressive Broadcasting Systems)
- Liberty Broadcasting System (created by Gordon McLendon, father of Top-40 Radio)
- MetroMedia Radio
- Mutual Broadcasting System (absorbed by Westwood One), and its sister networks: Mutual Black Network, Mutual Lifestyle Radio, Mutual Cadena Hispanica, and Mutual Southwest Network
- National Black Network
- National Radio Network
- NBC News and Information Service
- NBC Talknet
- NBC Radio Network
- NBG Radio Network
- Progressive Broadcasting System
- Radio Disney
- Radio Unica (Spanish-language radio network)
- Radiovisa (Spanish-language talk radio network)
- Richard Field Lewis Jr. Stations (later Mid Atlantic Network Inc.)
- RKO Radio Network (absorbed by Westwood One, see also Transtar)
- Rural Radio Network (operated 1948-1960 in New York state)
- Satellite Music Network (now owned by Cumulus Media Networks)
- Sheridan Broadcasting Network
- The Source
- Sports Fan Radio Network
- Talk America Radio Network
- Transtar (still in operation under other names, now owned by Dial Global)
- United Press International Radio Network
- United Stations Radio Network (the original version, merged into Westwood One; the similarly named United Stations Radio Networks was a revival based on this version and is still in operation)
- Washington News Desk
- Waitt Radio Networks (now owned by Dial Global)
- Westinghouse Broadcasting Company (Group W)
- Yankee Network and Colonial Network
