= Jim Engster =

Louisiana radio journalist

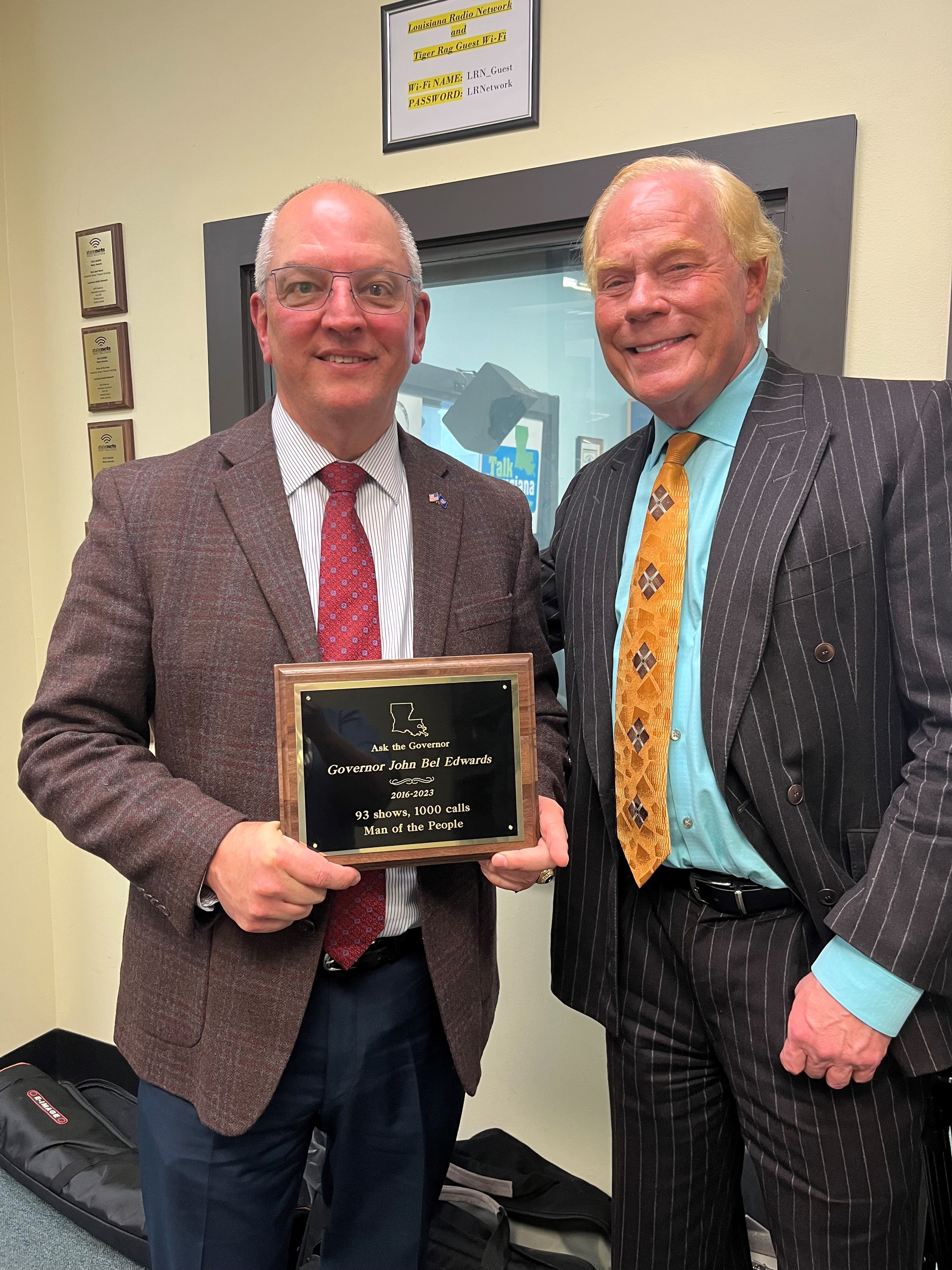
Engster (right) with then Louisiana Governor John Bel Edwards

James R. Engster is a journalist and host of "Talk Louisiana" on WRKF, the National Public Radio affiliate in Baton Rouge.

Engster is also owner and president of Louisiana Radio Network (LRN), which provides news, sports and agricultural news statewide. He served two tours as president of the National Association of State Radio Networks, which provides news in thirty-two states for more than 1,500 affiliate stations and regional radio advertising campaigns for marketers nationwide. Engster is a political analyst for WAFB in Baton Rouge and has been featured since 2002 in election night coverage for CBS affiliation.

He hosted "Ask the Governor", a monthly call-in show for listeners to speak with Governor John Bel Edwards for 93 months, the longest running gubernatorial radio program in Louisiana history.

Engster has interviewed eleven of his state's governors.

== Education ==
Engster is a 1981 graduate of Louisiana State University and was inducted into the LSU Manship School Hall of Fame in 2012. In April 2018, the LSU Alumni Association inducted Engster into the LSU Hall of Distinction, an honor that recognizes alumni who have distinguished themselves and the university through their careers, civic accomplishments, volunteer activities, and loyalty to their alma mater.

== Career ==
Engster has built his legacy as "the inveterate Louisiana talk radio host, historiographer, and pantomath of state politics."

From 1983 to 1998, Engster served as a reporter and news director for Louisiana Network. In 1998, he began hosting "Louisiana Live," a syndicated call-in talk show airing on more than 20 affiliates. "Louisiana Live" was named best public affairs program three times by the Louisiana-Mississippi Associated Press Managing Editors.

From 2003 to 2006, Engster served as general manager of WRKF. In 2006, he returned to Louisiana Network as general manager. In March 2010, Engster bought a controlling interest in the network and Tiger Rag Magazine, a publication and website that focuses on Louisiana State University sports. From March 2004 to October 2014, “The Jim Engster Show” was heard live on NPR affiliate WRKF-FM.

From 2014 - 2017, he hosted "The Jim Engster Show" on the commercial station WBRP in Baton Rouge and six other affiliates statewide.

In addition to his work in radio, Engster also is a long-time featured columnist and current president of Tiger Rag Magazine, “the Bible of LSU sports.” The magazine focuses on sports at Louisiana State University. Engster's column “Statistically Speaking” incites frequent comments from readers and LSU insiders. In 2018, Engster was named Louisiana Sports Writers Association's Columnist of the Year.

The Public Relations Association of Louisiana named Engster Communicator of the Year in 2008. The YWCA Greater Baton Rouge awarded him the Racial Justice Award in 2011 "for his advocacy of racial and social justice". Engster has served 10 terms as President of the Press Club of Baton Rouge and is also chair of the LSU Media Board, which oversees student media operations. In 2024, Engster became a member of the Louisiana Political Museum and Hall of Fame.
