= Louisiana Radio Network =

State radio network in Louisiana, United States

- Country: United States
- Headquarters: Baton Rouge, Louisiana

Programming
- Language(s): English

Ownership
- Owner: Jim Engster (2010-present)

History
- Launch date: October 1974
- Former names: Louisiana Network

Links
- Website: www.louisianaradionetwork.com

Louisiana Radio Network (LRN) is a state radio network based in Baton Rouge, Louisiana, that produces news, sports, business and agricultural news programming distributed via satellite to 62 affiliates throughout Louisiana and parts of Mississippi. LRN is a sponsor of the annual Louisiana Agriculture Hall of Distinction and publishes Tiger Rag Magazine, which focuses on Louisiana State University sports.

Launched in 1974, the network was acquired in 2010 by Jim Engster, who has been involved with LRN since 1983.

In August 2012, LRN merged its agrinews programming with the Louisiana Farm Bureau Radio Network to create the only agriculture network of its kind in Louisiana, the Louisiana Farm Bureau Agrinews Network, and one of the South’s largest agrinews programming networks.

== Programming ==
LRN's daily broadcast schedule is a mix of live and prerecorded programs that air throughout the day.

LRN provides two news-call programs, each consisting of up to 20 actualities by newsmakers of the day. Affiliates are free to integrate the cuts into locally produced newscasts. LRN news scripts are transmitted to affiliates similar to wire services. The network also offers various news features, which includes the latest business and financial news.

LRN provides daily coverage of the Louisiana legislature during all regular and special sessions, utilizing microphones in both the Louisiana House of Representatives and the Louisiana State Senate. Additionally, "Ask the Governor" is a monthly radio show that gives residents an opportunity to directly engage with Governor John Bel Edwards on topics they deem important.

== History ==
One of the country's earliest state radio networks, LRN was launched in 1974 as the Louisiana Network by five investors — Tim Patton, Rhett and Ann McMahon, John Brewer, and John Keogh. The network offered live, hourly newscasts via leased broadcast circuits, or dedicated long-distance telephone lines, to 12 charter affiliates. Stations in Ferriday, Oak Grove and Farmerville were among the first affiliates, several of which remain with the network.

After assembling the broadcast and electronic equipment, the McMahons and Brewer constructed a studio and small office. Once the studio was linked to the broadcast circuits leased from South Central Bell, the first LRN newscast aired in October 1974.

Brewer and Ann McMahon wrote and announced 13 daily newscasts Monday-Friday for the first year. Though the newscasts originally were timed by hand, the network used a control clock synchronized with Greenwich Mean Time to maintain accurate broadcast schedules.

The LRN staff began expanding in 1975 with the hiring of a full-time sales manager and a farm director in 1976.

=== Gulf Coast expansion ===
In 1978, LRN and the Georgia Network formed Interstate Communications Inc. and launched the Florida Network. Separately, LRN bought the fledgling Mississippi Network (MN) in 1980 and moved its operations from the outskirts of Jackson, Mississippi, to a new downtown office and studio space closer to the Mississippi State Capitol, where MN reporters conducted a majority of newsgathering.

=== College sports ===
Beginning in the mid-1980s, LRN has at various times offered radio play-by-play broadcasts rights for several Louisiana universities. With the Mississippi Network, LRN was among the country’s first regional radio networks to acquire university sports broadcasting rights. LRN also pioneered the combination of game-day broadcasts with advertising and stadium sales of game-day programs, now common for the industry. LRN held the network rights for LSU sports from 1994-2006.

In 2000, LRN acquired Tiger Rag Magazine, which bills itself as "the Bible of LSU sports." The magazine offers game previews and recaps, in-depth interviews and photos. It is known for its extensive LSU football recruiting coverage and insider information.

In 2005, the magazine's operations were moved into LRN's offices. The two companies are based in the Court Plaza Building, located south of downtown Baton Rouge and LSU.

In 2016, the magazine launched Tiger Rag Extra in addition to its main publication. Tiger Rag Extra covers recruiting and game analysis, along with the food, fashion and passion of LSU sports.

In 2019, Tiger Rag launched Tiger Rag TV, an hour long, in-depth look at LSU sports. The weekly show features recognized sports guests and coaches from throughout Louisiana, with emphasis on fans, tailgating, and the rich history of LSU sports. Engster serves as one of the program's hosts, along with Tiger Rag editor Ron Higgins, associate editor Tyler Nunez and Louisiana Radio Network news and sports director Jeff Palermo and WAFB-TV weekend reporter Chelsea Leblanc.

=== Technology upgrades ===
In 1983, LRN became one of the first regional radio networks to move from leased broadcast circuits to satellite transmission. The network refined a system that used a much smaller portion of a single satellite transponder. The new method lowered costs and allowed LRN to sublease its satellite equipment to other companies that still use it for their own communications. Uplink facilities were built in Jackson, Mississippi, and in Baton Rouge to transmit programming from both networks. By 1985, LRN installed more than 150 downlinks to affiliates in both states.

=== Consolidation, ownership change ===
LRN began consolidating operations in the mid-1980s, selling its stake in the Florida Network to the Georgia Network. It also sold the Mississippi Network and the associated college-sports contracts. The company name was returned to Louisiana Network Inc.

In April 2010, Jim Engster, a long-time Baton Rouge journalist and radio talk-show host, bought a controlling interest in the network after getting final approval from the Federal Communications Commission. Engster is now owner and president of Louisiana Radio Network.

Engster worked for the network as a reporter, news director and talk-show host from 1983-1998. He returned in 2006 as general manager. Engster hosts "Talk Louisiana" on WRKF, National Public Radio.

== Tiger Rag ==
Tiger Rag Magazine is a print publication based in Baton Rouge, Louisiana that focuses on Louisiana State University athletics and positions itself as "The Bible of LSU Sports." Louisiana Radio Network owns Tiger Rag. It is produced twenty times a year with a varying schedule based on individual sports seasons. Tiger Rag produces content for several related products—TigerRag.com, Tiger Rag Extra, the Tiger Rag Daily Newsletter, the Tiger Rag Podcast and Tiger Rag Radio.

The Editor of Tiger Rag is Ron Higgins and the Assistant Editor is Adam Henderson. It features columnists including journalist and Louisiana Radio Network owner, Jim Engster, veteran Times Picayune sportswriter Jim Kleinpeter and USA Today Network's LSU beat reporter, Glenn Guilbeau.

The magazine, known for its extensive coverage of LSU football, also offers game previews, recaps, in-depth interviews and recruiting news. The annual football-season preview is the most popular issue. Tiger Rag is available monthly January, February, March, April, May, June, July, August, and December; weekly in September, October and November.

Tiger Rag has been, at times, influential in shaping public opinion on the team's quality of play and administrator's decisions. In an exclusive interview with former assistant editor, Tyler Nunez, LSU athletics director Scott Woodward broke the news that the athletic department would end its fund-transfer policy with the university that began under former director of athletics Joe Alleva.
