= HPR =

HPR may refer to:

- Handley Page (Reading)
- HPR (gene)
- Harvard Political Review
- Hawaii Public Radio
- Heartland Public Radio
- HPR1, Heparanase
- HPR - Honza Průša, Czech painter, writer and actor
- High-power rocketry
- Highly Protected Risk in insurance; see FM Global
- Holding period return
- IBM Home Page Reader, spoken web browser
- Homiletic and Pastoral Review
- Hornsdale Power Reserve, a large battery in Australia
- Host plant resistance
- Hungarian People's Republic
- Pointing dog
