= Bernard Meltzer =

American radio personality (1916–1998)

Bernard C. Meltzer (May 2, 1916 – March 25, 1998) was a United States radio host for several decades. His advice call-in show, "What's Your Problem?," aired from 1967 until the mid-1990s on stations WCAU-AM and WPEN-AM in Philadelphia, WOR-AM and WEVD-AM in New York and in national syndication on NBC Talknet.

A city planner by training, with a civil engineering degree from City College of New York and a master's degree from the Wharton School at the University of Pennsylvania, Meltzer moved from a career as a Philadelphia expert in urban problems to a radio host on WCAU. In 1973 his show moved to WOR in New York.

Meltzer's show provided counsel on a wide range of quandaries, ranging from financial to personal: callers were as likely to ask about family crises, parenting issues and romantic problems as they were to ask about plumbing, home improvement or investment problems. Segments were often bracketed by Meltzer delivering aphorisms or reciting moralizing poetry ("What shall we do with grandma, now that she's old and gray?") in his distinctive smooth, soothing, quiet voice. His show at one time held the highest ratings among adults in his time slot. Thanks to a doctoral degree earned by correspondence from an unaccredited university, listeners usually referred to him as "Doctor Meltzer." Meltzer learned he had Parkinson's disease around 1985, continuing on WOR until a brief final stint on WEVD in the 1990s.

Among his many sayings were: "Courts are made for judges and lawyers" and, as he often sought to provide comfort, "The good people in this world far outnumber the bad."

Meltzer, a Jewish man, chose to work Sunday, to give his Christian colleagues time off for worship.

Talk radio legend Bruce Williams said Meltzer was his inspiration to get into talk radio, after listening to him for years sitting in the car while his daughters attended Sunday School.

== Bibliography ==
- Burke, Christine. "Radio Pioneer 'Uncle Bernie' Meltzer is dead." The New York Post, March 27, 1998. TV Plus section, p. 111.
- Graham, Ellen. New York: Wall Street Journal, June 22, 1978. P. 1. (Retrieved from Information Bank Abstracts)
- Hinckley, David. "Meltzer Still in Tune with 'Radio Family'." New York:Daily News, March 2, 1995. Television section, p. 94.
- Thomas, Robert M. (March 27, 1998). "Bernard Meltzer, Dispenser Of Advice on Radio, Dies at 81". The New York Times.
