= NBC Talknet =

American radio program service

- Type: Radio network
- Country: United States

Ownership
- Owner: RCA (1981–1986); General Electric; (1986–1987); Westwood One; (1987–2001)

History
- Launch date: November 2, 1981 (44 years ago)
- Closed: June 22, 2001; (19 years, 232 days)

Coverage
- Availability: Most of the United States
- Affiliates: 31 upon launch

NBC Talknet was a nighttime programming block on the NBC Radio Network from the 1980s to the 1990s. It comprised several advice-oriented call-in talk shows, the most notable personalities being Bruce Williams and Sally Jessy Raphael. At a time when talk radio was a mostly local format, Talknet, among similar services, brought the format to a national level.

== History ==
Prior to the late 1970s, AM radio was still largely dominated by all-music formats. Many individual radio stations had introduced some talk programming to their lineups, but it was almost universally locally produced. The concept of national talk radio, broadcast over a radio network, had not been tried. In 1975, Herb Jepko pioneered the first nationwide late-night call-in radio program heard on the Mutual Broadcasting System. Jepko was briefly succeeded on Mutual by Long John Nebel and Candy Jones in 1977. In January 1978, Larry King began broadcasting six hours of talk programming nightly on Mutual; King's program rapidly gained a large following, and his success proved to radio programmers that there was an audience for both late-night talk programming and national talk radio programming. NBC and ABC were quick to follow Mutual into the late-night talk radio market. ABC launched a daily block of programming called TalkRadio and NBC launched Talknet.

== Programming ==
At the time when Talknet was introduced, the Fairness Doctrine was still in place, requiring radio and television stations, among other things, to give equal time to both sides of controversial issues presented on the air. As a result, most radio stations avoided opinion programming and instead opted for call-in shows such as those featured on Talknet that were advice-oriented, with listeners calling in to ask questions and receive help with various issues and problems in their lives.

Talknet premiered on 21 stations nationwide on Monday, November 2, 1981. Early affiliates included WRC Washington; WIOD Miami; KXL Portland, Oregon; WJW Cleveland; KFBK Sacramento; WLW Cincinnati; KOB Albuquerque; WDAY Fargo; WOOD Grand Rapids; WCAR Detroit; and WSTV Steubenville, Ohio. Maurice Tunick was creator and executive producer.

Tunick: "I came up with the name 'Talknet' and created and developed the 'Dear Abby' format for Sally Jessy Raphael which I tested earlier that year on NBC's WRC in Washington D.C. Prior to Talknet the only radio advice shows were hosted by clinical psychologists. My idea for Sally was 'a friend.' Over the back fence advice. Someone to talk to, someone who cares (as the theme music said). A daring, revolutionary idea at the time. Sally was a well-traveled but unknown broadcaster at the time. Sally's TV show would start a couple of years later (1983), a direct result of her Talknet success. Much forgotten is that Bruce Williams originally aired at 10 PM Eastern to Midnight, and Sally Jessy Raphael aired Midnight to 3 AM Eastern time. That quickly changed, I'm not sure how long, maybe a couple of months, to 7-10 PM and 10-1 AM. The shows were a hit out of the box and stations asked for earlier feed time. Weekend programming was added a year later with Bernard Meltzer and Dr. Harvey Ruben."

Bruce Williams answered questions from listeners on issues related to money, personal finance, investments, business, and other similar topics.

On December 5, 1982, Williams crashed while attempting to land his airplane in Princeton, New Jersey. Tunick: "He was critically injured and nearly clinically dead when he arrived at the Medical Center of Princeton. One week later Bruce was back on the air from his hospital room and did his show from there for a week before he was released and originated his program from home for the next three months. We were told at the time this was the first national radio show to originate from a hospital." (Williams later said he was in a coma for 20 days following the crash, making his return to radio more like a month after the crash.)

Williams was a tentpole of the Talknet lineup and continued with the service until its demise. Raphael, however, remained as host for a total of six years, from 1981-1987. Following her departure, several other hosts filled the 10 p.m.-1 a.m. slot, dispensing personal and relationship advice. These included Myrna Lamb, Lee Mirabal, Dara Welles and Neil Myers, each of whom were much less successful than Raphael.

Bruce Williams retired from broadcasting on March 29, 2013.

== Demise ==
Tunick: "I left Talknet in late 1985 after being recruited by ABC Radio where I became Vice-President of Programming for the ABC Talkradio Network. I stayed close to Sally during the next year, knowing she had one year remaining on her contract. In late 1986, the radio world was shocked to learn Sally Jessy Raphael was jumping to ABC Radio." Tom Snyder joined soon after to make Sally (7-10) and Tom (10-1) the new bookends of nighttime listening. Neither show came close to the success of NBC Talknet. Both Snyder and Raphael left ABC Radio to focus on television projects. Deborah Norville joined ABC shortly after her short stint on the Today Show. Her radio show was also unsuccessful.

In 1986, NBC and its parent company, RCA, was purchased by General Electric. GE acquired RCA primarily to gain ownership of the NBC television network and shortly thereafter divested most of RCA's various other divisions. The NBC Radio Network was sold to Westwood One in 1987. NBC Radio became a programming service of Westwood One until 1990. After that date, the NBC name continued to be used on certain programming, but NBC Radio no longer existed as a separate programming service. Westwood One continued the "Talknet" programming through the mid-1990s, but eventually dropped the "Talknet" name as well as the 10 p.m.-1 a.m. personal advice programming. The time slot was later held by Jim Bohannon, who succeeded Larry King on the Mutual Broadcasting System (Westwood One acquired Mutual in 1985 and retired the Mutual name in 1999). The Jim Bohannon Show remained on the air until Bohannon’s death in November, 2022.

Bruce Williams remained with Westwood One hosting his own individual program from 7-10 p.m. for some years more, but eventually moved to the Talk America Radio Network (then owned by IDT) on June 25, 2001, and later Business Talk Radio Network until 2008. From 2008 to 2010, he self-syndicated the show, which included a relay on the Sirius-XM channel also called "America's Talk" as well as on the Cable Radio Network.

Raphael focused her efforts on television, but after her TV show was canceled, relaunched her show as "Sally JR's Open House", originally an Internet-only effort, but later transferred to radio syndication. Raphael's last radio show was broadcast on July 7, 2008.

== See also ==
- List of United States radio networks
