= Sally Jessy Raphael =

American television host (born 1935)

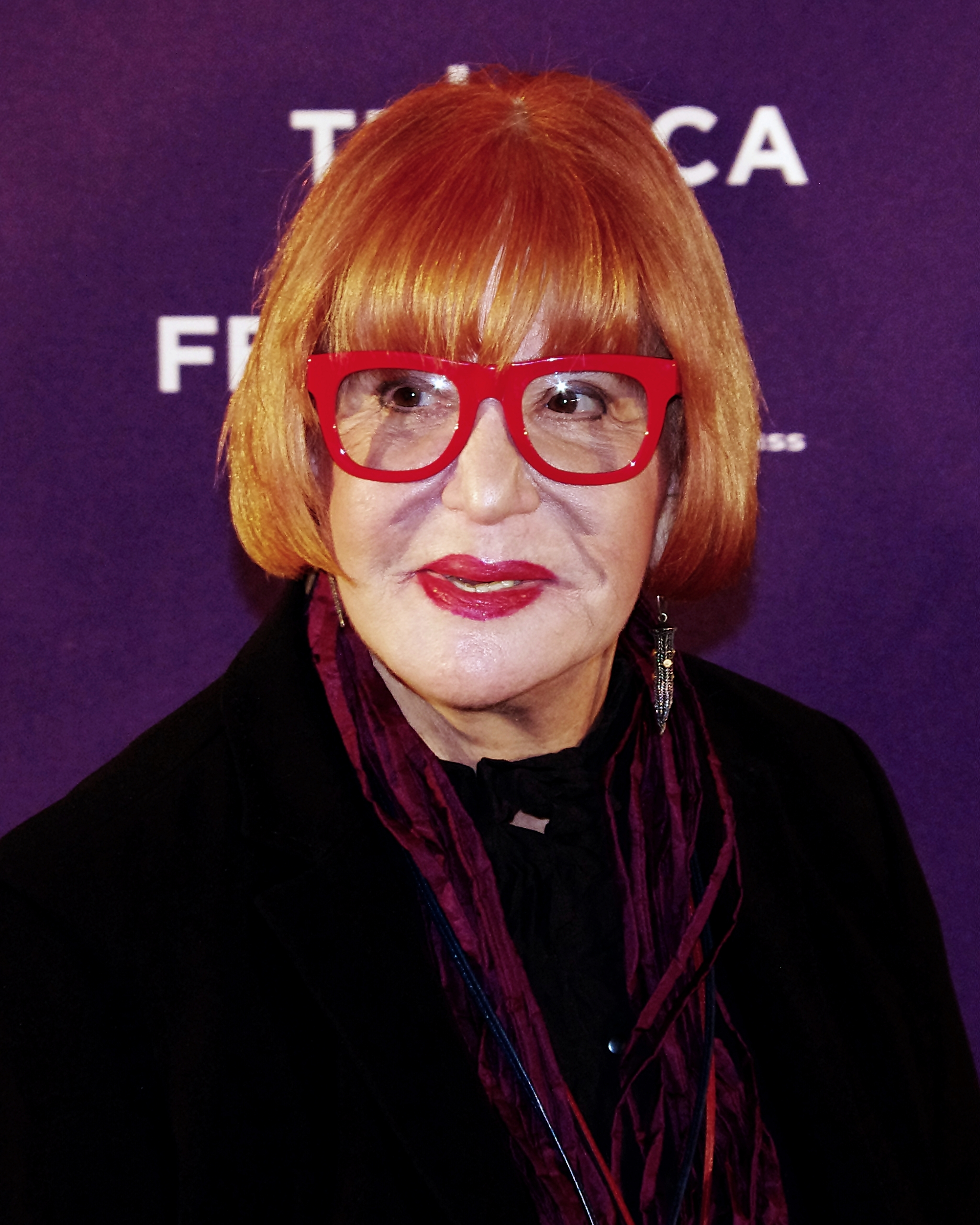
- Raphael in 2012
- Born: Sally Ray Lowenthal; February 25, 1935 (age 91); Easton, Pennsylvania, U.S.
- Occupation: Talk show host
- Years active: 1959–2024
- Spouses: Andrew Vladimir (m. 1956; div. 1963) Karl Soderland (m. 1963; died 2020)
- Children: 3

Sally Lowenthal (born February 25, 1935), better known as Sally Jessy Raphael, is an American retired broadcaster, radio jockey and television talk show host, who is best known for her program Sally (originally called The Sally Jessy Raphael Show).

== Early life and education ==
Lowenthal was born on February 25, 1935, in Easton, Pennsylvania. She graduated from Easton Area High School in Easton. She lived in San Juan, Puerto Rico, where her father, Jesse Lowenthal, was in the rum exporting business and her mother, Zelda Lowenthal (aka Dede Lowry), ran an art gallery. She has a younger brother, Steven Lowenthal.

During her teenage years in Scarsdale, New York she worked at the local AM radio station, WFAS in White Plains. The station had a program in which Junior High School students had the opportunity to read the news on the air and Raphael was selected to participate. She attended Carnegie Mellon University in Pittsburgh, as well as the University of Puerto Rico in San Juan. She graduated from Columbia University in Manhattan. Raphael studied acting under the tutelage of Sanford Meisner at noted Neighborhood Playhouse School of the Theatre in Manhattan.

She took her mother's maiden name of Raphael as her professional last name and used the theatrical surname of Jessy from her father's family to use as a distinguishing middle name.

== Career ==
=== Journalism and broadcasting ===
After graduating from Columbia she became a news correspondent covering Central America for both major American news syndicates at that time, Associated Press and United Press International. Raphael has acknowledged that her hiring was in large part due to her Puerto Rican heritage, connections, and fluency in English and Spanish, which includes the ability to easily translate and switch between the two.

She obtained considerable media experience working in Puerto Rico, where she worked in both radio and television. One of her first jobs was hosting a TV cooking show. While working in radio, she met the man who became her second husband, Karl Soderlund, who was the general manager of a radio station there that hired her. After Soderlund lost his job, the two left Puerto Rico to work back on the continent in Miami (with its heavily bi-lingual Hispanic population). While Raphael was on the air as a radio announcer in Miami, she met and became friends with veteran journalist and talk show host Larry King.

Raphael worked for radio stations in both Puerto Rico and the United States, including working as a disc jockey, news reporter, and the host of a show where she interviewed celebrities. In the early 1980s, she was asked to do a call-in advice show on WMCA in Lower Manhattan. In 1989, she played herself on the television series, The Equalizer, in an episode called "Making of a Martyr" interviewing a gun control advocate.

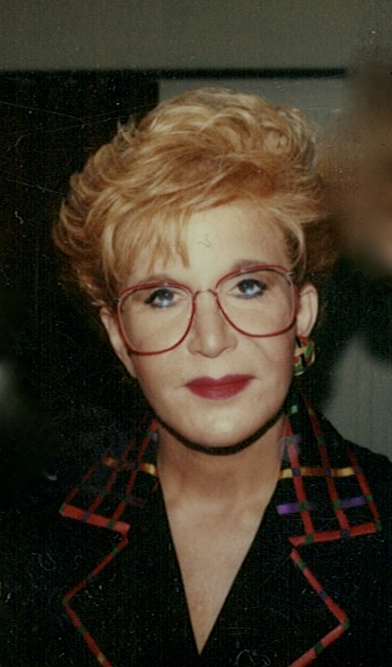
Raphael on the set of her talk show in the early 1990s

=== Talk show ===
Raphael's husband Karl Soderlund assumed the role of her manager, and was a partner in her two biggest successes. She hosted a radio call-in advice show distributed by NBC Talknet which ran from 1981 to 1987, but she is best known for hosting the television talk show The Sally Jessy Raphael Show (later shortened to Sally), which ran in first-run syndication from October 17, 1983, to May 24, 2002. "Talknet" was brand new when she came to the attention of producer Maurice Tunick. According to David Richards of The Washington Post, Tunick had auditioned a number of potential hosts, but had not yet found the right one. Tunick gave Raphael a one-hour trial run on NBC's affiliate, WRC in Washington, D.C. in August 1981. Before going on the air, she decided that rather than doing a political show, she would give advice and discuss subjects she knew a lot about, such as relationship problems. Soon, her advice show was being heard on over 200 radio stations, and she developed a loyal group of fans.

One of those fans was iconic talk show host Phil Donahue, who happened to hear her show one night and liked how she related to the audience. His encouragement led to a tryout on television, where producer Burt Dubrow gave her a chance to be a guest host on his talk show. She was not very polished, but people who had loved her radio show were very positive about her being on TV. Her non-threatening and common-sense manner appealed to Dubrow, who believed she would gain more confidence as she got some TV experience. By mid-October 1983, she was given her own show on KSDK-TV in St. Louis. The Sally Jessy Raphael Show was only a half hour long, but it was the beginning of her successful career as a talk show host.

Raphael became known to television viewers for her oversized red-framed glasses, a trademark that began entirely by accident. The source of her famous red-framed glasses goes all the way back to her first broadcast news job. Raphael had difficulty reading the teleprompter and, with five minutes before air time, quickly went to a store across the street from the studio to purchase a pair of reading glasses. The only pair she could afford was an oversized red pair. While station managers disliked them, the audience seemed to think they looked good, so she kept wearing that style. In 1991 Raphael, and the talk show, featured in a cameo in the Paramount film The Addams Family.

By 2000, both Raphael and The Jerry Springer Show were in decline. As one media critic observed, Springer's ratings were the lowest they had been in three years, but Raphael's ratings were the lowest they had been in 12 years. Raphael was already having problems with her syndicator: she believed that USA Networks Inc. was more interested in doing promotion for Springer, whose show was more popular than hers, and for Maury Povich, who had recently left Paramount Television to join USA's syndication arm, than they ever were for her own show. She celebrated her 3,500th episode in early 1998. By March 2002, it was announced that, after an 19-year run, her show was being cancelled. In 2002, Raphael was named by Talkers Magazine to both their 25 Greatest Radio Talk Show Hosts of all time (#5), and the 25 Greatest Television Talk Show Hosts of all time (#11). She was one of only three personalities to make both the radio and the TV lists.

From about 2005 to 2008, she hosted a daily radio show, Sally Jessy Raphael on Talknet (previously called Sally JR's Open House), on the Internet and in syndication to local radio stations. The show's flagship station was WVIE, broadcasting from Baltimore and the show aired on numerous AM stations in New England, the Mid-Atlantic and the Midwest, in addition to one station KWFM in South Tucson, Arizona. The show also aired on XM Satellite Radio's America's Talk channel from November 19, 2007, until its end eight months later. The name "Talknet" is a revival of the name of the old NBC Talknet, the now-defunct radio network that carried her previous radio show from 1981 to 1987. She abruptly ended the Talknet program July 7, 2008.

On November 10, 2010, Raphael, along with former famous national talk show hosts Phil Donahue, Geraldo Rivera, Ricki Lake and Montel Williams were invited to be guests on The Oprah Winfrey Show. Raphael offered to induct conservative talk show host Rush Limbaugh (1951–2021), into the Radio Hall of Fame when he was voted into the Hall in 1993. Surprised by the offer, Limbaugh accepted, only to see Raphael use her speech to speak out against the vote and excoriate Limbaugh. The following day, longtime radio news commentator Paul Harvey used his radio program to defend Limbaugh, who was privately hurt by Raphael's betrayal. In an act of retribution, one of Limbaugh's staffers slipped a picture of Raphael without her makeup or trademark glasses (taken from one of Raphael's staffers, as both hosts worked in the same studio at the time) onto Limbaugh's television program without his knowledge.

In 2014, Raphael hosted the Logo web series Sally Jessy Rides. In 2024, Raphael had a cameo in the Everybody Still Hates Chris episode "Everybody Still Hates Drew’s Brother".

== Personal life ==
Raphael was married for the first time in 1956 to Andrew Vladimir; they divorced seven years later. They had two daughters. One of her daughters, Allison, died at the age of 33 on February 2, 1992; her death was ruled an accidental overdose because of "combined effects of several prescribed drugs and over-the-counter medications."

She and Karl Soderlund married in 1963, and he became her manager. They have an adopted son and three foster children. They were married for 57 years until Soderlund's death on August 6, 2020.
