= Northern Broadcasting System =

American broadcast network

- Northern Broadcasting System logo
- Country: United States
- Headquarters: Montana

Programming
- Language(s): English

History
- Founded: 1975 by Conrad Burns

Links
- Website: www.northernbroadcasting.com

Northern Broadcasting System was started in 1975 by Conrad Burns (who later became a United States Senator from Montana) as an agricultural broadcast network called the Northern Agricultural Network. Burns created the network after seeing an opportunity to provide information to the agri-business community, Montana's top industry. The network had four stations at its inception and grew in size. In 1986, Burns sold the network to enter Montana politics.

Under the guidance of the network's new President/CEO Taylor Brown, the network grew to cover parts of eight states in the Northwestern United States and Canada.

Northern Broadcasting is a blanket organization which includes the Northern News Network, the Northern Sports Network, and the Northern Ag Network. In addition to the radio stations on the networks, thirteen television stations also air farm and ranch news across Montana, Wyoming and the western Dakotas.

== Programs produced ==
The network produces eight full length newscasts per day anchored by News Director Brian Bennett. In addition, the network has several complete broadcast weather forecasts in the Northern region with weather from meteorologist Ed McIntosh. The four-minute forecasts include extensive agricultural information as well as general weather news. The network entered a program to help alert Montana residents to severe weather.

The Voices Of Montana is the only live, full hour, daily statewide radio talk show in Montana. Politicians, businessmen, state organizations, and citizens are invited to appear on the program. The show is hosted by host Jon Arneson.

== Awards ==
Northern Broadcasting has won a number of awards and been involved in philanthropic and charitable organizations in Montana. The National Association of Agricultural Educators recognized at a national level, the work done by Taylor Brown and Northern Broadcasting. Brown is a former president of the National Association of Farm Broadcasters. In 2010 Brown was named to the National Farm Broadcasters Hall Of Fame. Northern Ag's Farm Director Russell Nemetz is Chairman of the Montana Grazing Lands Conservation Initiative in 2011.

== Network coverage ==
Northern Broadcasting has affiliated stations carrying their programming in several Montana cities. The network is also heard in cities in neighboring states including North Dakota, South Dakota, and Wyoming.
