= WRKF =

- Baton Rouge, Louisiana; United States
- Broadcast area: Baton Rouge metropolitan area
- Frequency: 89.3 MHz (HD Radio)
- Branding: WRKF 89.3

Programming
- Format: Public radio and talk
- Subchannels: HD2: Classical music
- Affiliations: National Public Radio; Public Radio Exchange; BBC World Service

Ownership
- Owner: Public Radio Inc.

History
- First air date: January 18, 1980

Technical information
- Licensing authority: FCC
- Facility ID: 53834
- Class: C1
- ERP: 28,000 watts
- HAAT: 285 meters (935 ft)
- Transmitter coordinates: 30°22′22.00″N 91°12′16.00″W

Links
- Public license information: Public file; LMS
- Webcast: Listen live
- Website: WRKF.org

WRKF (89.3 FM) is a non-commercial radio station licensed to Baton Rouge, Louisiana, United States. Owned by Public Radio, Inc., the station is a member of NPR with a news-oriented weekday lineup. WRKF's studios are located on Valley Creek Drive in the southeast side of Baton Rouge, and its transmitter is located on 7001 River Road near the Mississippi River in the west side of the city.

WRKF broadcasts using HD Radio technology. It airs classical music from Classical 24 on its HD-2 digital subchannel.

== History ==
WRKF signed on the air on January 18, 1980. It initially was a community-based public radio station. The schedule included classical, jazz, folk music, blues, big bands and adult standards, along with some NPR news shows. The studios were in a temporary building at the transmitter site on Frenchtown Road.

In 1986, the station moved to studios on Valley Creek Drive in the city. By the 1990s, most music shows had been eliminated, leaving a largely news and information schedule of programs.

== Programming ==
WRKF is a member of National Public Radio. The station produces interview/call-in show Talk Louisiana with Jim Engster, along with Louisiana Things Considered, a daily half-hour news magazine shared with WWNO in New Orleans.

Music shows on weekend evenings include American Routes, Center Stage and a local Cajun and Americana music show, Hootenany Power. Overnight, WRKF carries the BBC World Service.
