= Heartland Public Radio =

Worldwide radio network playing Americana music

- Type: Public radio network
- Country: United States
- First air date: February 2004
- Availability: Global
- Founded: 2004
- Key people: George Fair, President/Director of Programming
- Official website: hpr.org

Heartland Public Radio (HPR) is a non-commercial, listener-supported, non-profit radio network that broadcasts several Americana-formatted music feeds to a worldwide audience directly via the Internet and via affiliated terrestrial radio stations.

== History ==
HPR was originally launched as a commercial Internet radio station in February 2004. It began operating under the name Heartland Public Radio on January 1, 2007, and that's when this commercial classic country station became known as "HPR1: The Classic Country Channel." On this date, Heartland Public Radio also launched a second live radio station known as "HPR2: The Western Music Channel."

On January 1, 2008, a third channel of non-commercial programming was launched—HPR3: The Bluegrass Channel.

On June 1, 2008, due to low ratings and listener support, HPR3: The Bluegrass Channel evolved into HPR3: The Bluegrass Gospel Channel and began featuring an all-Bluegrass Gospel format. Contributions from classic country and western music listeners to HPR1 and HPR2 were able to preserve existing programming on those two channels. Heartland Public Radio reported a 60% decline in listener contributions since the beginning of 2008—probably due to a growing economic recession.

On January 1, 2009, HPR3 again switched formats and names—becoming HPR3: The Alternative Country Channel. This new format focused on new and independent country music recordings that did not receive much, if any, airplay from commercial country radio stations.

On April 2, 2010, Heartland Public Radio rebranded "The Alternative Country Channel" as "Indie Country...Where Independent Country Lives!"

On July 1, 2010, Heartland Public Radio abruptly abandoned its Western Music format on Channel 2 flipping the station to a modernized rendition of its Channel 1 Classic Country format. HPR2 is now branded as "X Country...The Next Generation of Classic Country," and it features popular Classic Country music from the mid-1970s through the mid-1990s. HPR cited poor listener support for the Western Music format as the reason for the change in direction for Channel 2. Meanwhile, HPR1: The Classic Country Channel is now focusing on Traditional Classic Country music from the 1940s through the early 1970s.

In 2011, Heartland Public Radio rebranded "HPR2: X-Country" as "HPR2: Today's Classic Country".

On January 2, 2012, instead of shutting down a temporary fourth channel of music which was featuring Classic Country and Bluegrass Christmas Music for the holidays, Heartland Public Radio brought back Bluegrass Gospel music. "HPR4: Bluegrass Gospel"—the second go-around for the genre on HPR has been a ratings success. Unfortunately, the reverse was true for "HPR3: Indie Country" later in 2012. On November 1, 2012, Heartland Public Radio brought back its annual Classic Country and Bluegrass Christmas Music—this time displacing HPR3: Indie Country.

On January 2, 2013, HPR3 was shut down, leaving a gap in HPR's channel allotment.

== Original programs ==
- "Truckin' Across The Heartland" with Trucker Rod (Sunday, Wednesday and Friday on HPR1: Traditional Classic Country)
