= Bruce Williams (talk radio host) =

American radio host, entrepreneur, and writer (1932–2019)

Bruce H. Williams
- Born: February 18, 1932
- Died: February 9, 2019 (aged 86); Florida, U.S.
- Occupations: Radio host, entrepreneur, writer
- Years active: 1975–2013

Bruce H. Williams (February 18, 1932 – February 9, 2019) was an American radio host, entrepreneur, writer and former mayor. His nationally syndicated talk show, first a part of NBC Talknet and later rebranded as The Bruce Williams Show, aired throughout the United States for 29 years, from 1981 until ending production in March 2010. Williams wrote six books, and he also wrote a syndicated advice column called Smart Money.

== Early life ==
Williams grew up in East Orange, New Jersey. He left Upsala College to serve with the United States Air Force in Korea. After earning a degree in education from Newark State Teachers College, which became Kean University, he became active in politics, education, and business in New Jersey. Williams was elected to the Franklin Township Council in a June 1967 runoff, one of three members of a Republican-backed slate to win a contest for four seats. He finished second, winning by 99 votes. He was re-elected in 1971 by 163 votes. He served as deputy mayor and mayor.

== Radio career ==
In 1975, Williams entered broadcasting by hosting At Your Service on WCTC in New Brunswick, New Jersey. This was soon followed by his second show, Bruce Williams at Large. Williams then set his sights on reaching a larger audience, and his persistence paid off. In 1978, he was hired by WMCA in New York City. Williams made his debut on NBC Talknet when the programming block began on November 2, 1981. His national reputation began to grow. He began each show by saying "Welcome my friends...welcome to my world."

Williams flew airplanes and on December 5, 1982, while attempting to abort a landing, crashed into a few trees in Princeton, New Jersey. Maurice Tunick, Talknet creator and executive producer, remembers the incident:

Bruce was critically injured and nearly clinically dead when he arrived at the Medical Center of Princeton. One week later he was back on the air from his hospital room and did his show from there for a week before he was released and originated his program from home for the next three months. We were told at the time this was the first national radio show to originate from a hospital.

Williams himself later said he was in a coma for 20 days before being able to broadcast about four weeks later.

Williams was inducted into the National Radio Hall of Fame in 1999 and has since been listed as the sixth greatest talk show host in radio history by Talkers Magazine. Williams ran an advice show focused on personal business matters such as real estate transactions, career planning, entrepreneurship, and travel until the September 11, 2001 attacks. At that time, the show became a mix of business and politics, and every show ended with the song God Bless America.

On February 22, 2010, Williams announced in an email to affiliates that he would end his show effective March 5, 2010.

Not long after going off the air, Williams began posting occasional "newsletters" on his website that hinted he would like to get back on the air "in some fashion," including the possibility of "doing something with the internet." After being off the radio for just over two years, one of his newsletters announced that he would return to the airwaves via The American Entrepreneur, producing podcasts that would be available on iTunes and other platforms. The new show, which continued the same title "The Bruce Williams Show," debuted on Monday, April 16, 2012. The new program continued in the same format as his previous show, with less emphasis on politics. The show appeared "live" on Tuesdays and Thursdays, and three hours were recorded on Wednesdays for broadcast on Monday, Wednesday and Friday. During some of the initial programs of the new show, Williams hinted that he expected the show to eventually expand to two hours, and he also noted that he'd been contacted by several terrestrial radio stations interested in carrying the new program. The program ran until the mid-summer until the American Entrepreneur network was forced to shut down following the sudden death of its owner. Thus, Bruce Williams found himself without an outlet for his show.

On July 9, 2012, Bruce Williams launched the Made In America Broadcast Network, an enterprise which sponsored the podcasts of his show and also promoted products that were made in America with "at least 90%" American-made materials, using U.S. labor. His show appeared live via podcast Monday to Friday from 2:00 to 3:00 Eastern time, with an additional live show appearing on Wednesday evenings for a few weeks. The show was also available via the iTunes, SoundCloud, TuneIn, and Stitcher internet platforms. To attract listener participation, he made answering machines available and announced that "we will call you back" and arrange for a time to put the listener on the air. Unfortunately this tactic was unsuccessful, with Williams doing most of his shows as monologues with just the occasional phone call.

Bruce's goal with the Made In America Network was to only accept advertising from companies whose products and/or services were made in America with American labor. He eventually announced that many of the companies producing American-made items as required to advertise on his network were too small to have a national-sized advertising budget, which led to sponsors advertising for a very short period of time. By the beginning of 2013, the show was featuring only Jersey Boy Pork Roll, a Williams-owned company, in its advertising.

On March 18, 2013, Williams announced on his podcast that the show and the network had not been financially viable, and planned to discontinue the podcasts and retire from broadcasting on March 29, 2013. During the announcement, he said "This will be the end of my broadcasting career, unless someone happens to offer me a job where I just show up and do the show and don't have to worry about the rest of it; but that's not likely to happen." His last podcast contained an emotional recap of his broadcasting career along with several phone calls from listeners. He stated that he planned to continue writing his newspaper column, Smart Money, which appeared in American newspapers.

Williams also wrote several financial and real estate advice books in addition to his broadcast career.

== Miscellaneous ventures ==
During his radio career Williams spoke frequently about the jobs he held throughout the years. He began by melting down lead pipes into toy soldiers and selling them to other children at the age of 11 during World War II. Later in life, Williams entered a wide variety of business ventures including insurance sales, driving a beer truck, driving a taxi, real estate sales, a flower shop, a car rental agency, a barber shop, and several nightclubs. He drove an ice cream truck in New York City and was the founder of Lane Robbins, now Oak Crest Day Camp, a private preschool in Somerset, New Jersey. He also spent two terms as mayor of Franklin Township, New Jersey from 1967 to 1975.

In his later years, Williams was involved in a florist business and was a board member of a bank. In 2009, he and several investors founded Jersey Boy Pork Roll, an online store selling pork roll products from three manufacturers. Two of his children, Robbins and Michael, ran the former Jellyrolls nightclub at Disney's Boardwalk in Orlando.

== Books ==
- America Asks Bruce
- House Smart
- In Business for Yourself
- Protecting your Financial Future (foreword)
- The Bruce Williams Source Book
- Thanks for Asking
