= State radio network =

There are currently 31 state radio networks in the National Association of State Radio Networks. Each network operates on a similar premise but ownership of each network varies. In principle, each individual network provides live satellite fed radio programs to radio stations in their respective state. The networks rarely charge each individual radio station for these programs, but rather barters with each affiliate for commercial radio time. The network subsequently sells this bartered commercial time to local, regional and national advertisers.

Programming on each network tends to focus on news, weather and sports that concern residents of each respective state. For example, The Louisiana Network will distribute news cast and sportscasts that pertain to the state of Louisiana. Programs tend to be between three and five minutes long. Radio stations are allowed to air all or parts of any broadcast but are contractually obligated to carry all commercial inventory. The vast majority of radio stations will air each fed program in its entirety.

The sale of commercial radio time is administered by each individual network on a local (in state) level. National and regional sales are conducted by StateNets Sales located in Crete, Illinois.

The Texas State Network (TSN) was the first interconnected network and began broadcasting over 60 years ago. TSN is the oldest and largest state radio network in America, incorporated by Elliott Roosevelt (Eleanor's son) and others on August 2, 1938. Five weeks later, TSN's debut broadcast originated from the old Casa Manana in Fort Worth, and featured personalities like Bob Hope and Texas Governor James V. Allred, along with a 300-voice choir.

Original programming included soap operas such as Uncle Jeremiah and The Adventures of Gary and Jill. Most of TSN's early programming, like today's, was devoted to news and sports. Nearly 30 network announcers, production personnel. and control room operators produced Grand Prize Beer's Highlights in the World News each day. Today, TSN provides news, sports, business, weather, agriculture and talk programming to about 130 radio stations, including seven of the affiliates that carried TSN's premier broadcast.

All 31 networks in the National Association of State Radio Networks are interconnected via satellite and distribute programming via downlinks. Most networks have recently begun delivering their programming via the internet. The average network has 55 affiliates.

Many networks are also affiliated with professional and college sports teams. By providing efficient audio delivery, the networks are a major delivery service for dozens of college and university sports programs. They also make this inventory available for sale.
