= 2008 in North American radio =

Several events occurred in radio in 2008.

== Events ==
- January 2: WWFT finished Christmas music stunting, rolling out the red carpet for adult contemporary music branded as "Warm".
- January 10: WOCL in Orlando re-brands as "Sunny 105.9", restoring Oldies in the market with a Classic hits format.
- January 18: Music of Your Life changes hands from Jones Radio Networks to Concierge Technologies.
- January 21: XM Sports Nation begins airing both The Dan Patrick Show and The Tony Kornheiser Show. Kornheiser's show returns to air on the same date after a seven-month hiatus.
- January 28: Tony Bruno leaves Sporting News Radio.
- February: Mike McConnell's weekday show is pulled from syndication; it will continue as a local show, and his weekend show will remain syndicated.
- February 21: Air America Radio changes hands for the second time in less than a year; Pendulum Media purchases the network from Mark Green.
- March 1: Citadel Broadcasting announces a large loss of revenue and jettisons several staffers. Among the notable names dismissed were John R. Gambling and Ron Kuby of WABC, Chris Core of WMAL and Peter Tilden of KABC. Melanie Morgan of KSFO, while not laid off, did not have her contract renewed. Meanwhile, Curtis Sliwa is promoted to mid-mornings at WABC, and a massive roll-out of Imus in the Morning and The True Oldies Channel commences.
- March 1: Rollye James discontinues syndication of her show and continues the show as a satellite-only program.
- March 3: CBS Radio divests itself of Westwood One; the latter company is sold to Gores Radio.
- April: Triton Media Group purchases Waitt Radio Networks and plans to consolidate its networks into its Dial Global brand.
- April 1: WRNO-FM in New Orleans switches format to "Rush Radio" and all-day replays of The Rush Limbaugh Show in a stunt that lasts six days. Limbaugh had previously been heard on crosstown rival WWL.
- April 3: Randi Rhodes is suspended from Air America Radio and quits the network a week later, joining Nova M Radio on April 14.
- April 11: Don Geronimo, of Don and Mike, retires from radio.
- April 14: WQNR is rebranded as 99.9 Kate FM with a variety hits format.
- April 22: Drew Lane leaves his morning radio show Drew and Mike.
- April 23: Steve Shannon leaves the nationally syndicated Steve and DC Morning Show to take a job at WERC in Birmingham. The show continues with D.C. Chymes as host, under the title of "D.C. and the Family."
- April 30: AOL and XM Satellite Radio ended their partnership.
- May 15: WYSP/Philadelphia morning host Kidd Chris and PD John Cook are fired by CBS Radio after learning that a parody song that was performed live on Chris' show, "Schwoogies" by Lady Gash, contained racial slurs and content.
- May 24: Biz Radio Network moves from KMNY to KJSA in Dallas/Fort Worth Metroplex.
- June 1: The eXpat Chart launches on 4 English-language radio stations across Europe.
- June 10: AOL adds the streaming links from all of CBS Radio's 150 O&O stations to its online service.
- June 11: Smooth AC returns to Denver and Honolulu full-time via KKHI and KORL-FM, respectively.
- June 13: WGVC/Greenville, South Carolina, drops adult hits for an FM simulcast of news/talk WORD-AM/WYRD-AM with a callsign change to WYRD-FM.
- June 16: WGPR in Detroit changes to full urban AC, dropping smooth jazz (which they would sprinkle alongside urban AC) for several years rebranded The New 107.5 WGPR.
- June 19: WZZN in Chicago changes its call sign to WLS-FM.
- June 20: Triton Media Group purchases Jones Radio Networks and plans to consolidate its networks into its Dial Global brand. Jones Radio Networks officially signs off September 30.
- June 26: In Vancouver, Oldies CKBD moves from 600 to FM 100.5, debuting an alternative rock format.
- July 25: The FCC approves the merger of XM Satellite Radio and Sirius Satellite Radio, with certain conditions. Four days later on July 29, the company is renamed Sirius XM Radio.
- July 25: CTVglobemedia announces a deal to sell 1331 Yonge Street, the longtime home of its Toronto radio stations CHUM and CHUM-FM, to a residential developer. The stations, along with the building's neon sign—which is considered a landmark piece of Toronto's cultural heritage—will move to new studios at 250 Richmond Street West in downtown Toronto, near the 299 Queen Street West home of most of CTVglobemedia's cable television channels, in early 2009.
- August 1: Rush Limbaugh celebrates 20 years in national syndication. President George W. Bush, along with former President George H. W. Bush and former Florida governor Jeb Bush, call in at the top of the broadcast.
- August 1: CBS Radio announces that it will put 50 radio stations in mid-size markets up for sale.
- August 20: KJOC in Davenport, Iowa, switches from talk to an oldies format, getting most of its programming from ABC Radio Networks' "True Oldies Channel." The sports lineup continues to feature Chicago-area and Iowa State University sports.
- August 29: CHAM in Hamilton, Ontario, drops its classic country format and begins stunting with Christmas music, nominally becoming the first station in North America to switch to the format in 2008, before changing to talk radio on September 2.
- September 30: Jones Radio Networks signs off as it was sold to Triton Media Group, ceasing broadcasting three services: Contemporary jazz, Standards, Adult hits. See Jones Radio Networks#Satellite formats
- October 10: WMVN, the former MOViN station in St. Louis, Missouri, drops its format and becomes the first commercial station to change to Christmas music for the entire holiday season, before planning to change to sports radio on January 1, 2009. When considering only non-stunting stations, WRIT-FM in Milwaukee became the first non-stunting commercial station in the United States to change formats, on October 31.
- October 31: KNRJ of Phoenix, Arizona, says goodbye to their dance format after six years, debuting hip hop music.
- November 12: Sirius XM makes massive changes in its lineup on its Sirius and XM channels by eliminating or merging several duplicating formats.
- November 18: A.C. Nielsen announced that they will enter the radio ratings business, putting them in direct competition with Arbitron.
- December 15: CBS Radio trades five stations—KXJM and KLTH/Portland, Oregon, KBKS/Seattle, KQJK/Sacramento and WQSR/Baltimore—to Clear Channel Communications in exchange for Clear Channel's Houston outlets KHMX and KLOL.
- December 17: Border Media Partners changes names to Border Media.
- December 28: The Sean Hannity Show is scheduled to change syndicators; Premiere Radio Networks will take over syndication from ABC Radio; the show will continue to air on stations owned by ABC Radio parent company Citadel Broadcasting as part of the deal.
- December 31: Michael Reagan's syndication deal with Radio America ends; Reagan will be replaced by Roger Hedgecock in January 2009.

== Debuts ==
- Lou Dobbs Radio. March 3. Talk radio program hosted by Lou Dobbs, independent political activist and host of CNN's Lou Dobbs Tonight. Syndicated by United Stations.
- Tom Kent Radio Network. March 12. Kent, nine months after leaving the TKO Radio Network, launches a new network.
- March 13: Smooth Jazz station KHJZ/Houston flips to Top 40/CHR as "Hot 95-7".
- April 8: KRBV/Los Angeles drops urban adult contemporary for adult album alternative as "100.3 The Sound."
- Brantley and The Babe. April 11. The Fabulous Sports Babe marks her return to full-time radio after a seven-year hiatus, joining Scot Brantley on a daily afternoon talk show on WHBO.
- May 2: KVBE/Moapa, Nevada, debuts with a dance top 40 format, targeting Las Vegas.
- Rambling with Gambling. May 5. The long-running morning show hosted by John R. Gambling returns to WOR in New York City.
- May 12: KXJM/Portland, Oregon, drops rhythmic contemporary for a sports talk format as "95.5 The Game." The KXJM calls, rhythmic format and its popular morning show The Playhouse are picked up by CBS Radio outlet KVMX, which becomes "JAMMiN' 107.5" the same day. KVMX in turn becomes the first station to drop the rhythmic AC "MOViN'" format.
- August 12: Bonneville International flips Oldies KBSG/Tacoma/Seattle to all news.
- August 18: GSN Radio launches as an Internet only program, later to launch in syndication.
- August 18: CICS-FM, a country station, launches in Sudbury, Ontario.
- August 25: CKFM-FM in Toronto drops its Mix FM branding, becoming the first radio station in North America to license the British Virgin Radio brand.
- September: A controversial revamping of the program schedule on Canada's CBC Radio 2 network is unveiled. New programs include Radio 2 Morning, Tempo and Radio 2 Drive.
- September: The Point debuts on CBC Radio One.
- October 31: KWYD debuts a Rhythmic contemporary format in Boise, Idaho.
- November 26: McGavren Guild Media forms a new radio representation company after the closing of Interep the day before.
- December 8: A radio version of the MSNBC program Morning Joe debuts on WABC in New York City, with a launch on other ABC Radio stations soon to come.

== Closings ==
- Todd Pettengill's Saturday Night at the 80s. March 1. The ABC Radio program is quietly canceled due to network financial problems.
- Sally Jessy Raphael on Talknet. July 7. The program, hosted by former television talk show host Sally Jessy Raphael, was cancelled without notice.
- Mike and the Mad Dog. August 15. Host Chris "Mad Dog" Russo abruptly left the show and its flagship station WFAN on that day; Russo and Mike Francesa had hosted the show together since 1989. Russo leaves to found Mad Dog Radio, a satellite radio channel, shortly thereafter.
- 3WT Talk Radio. The Washington, D.C.-based talk radio station, notable for being the successor to Washington Post Radio and the home base of The Tony Kornheiser Show, announces that it isn't earning enough ratings and will be giving up its frequencies to WTOP and WFED, two all-news radio stations in the Washington market. Kornheiser will be without a flagship station upon his return in January 2009.
- Smooth Jazz (radio network). September 30. The smooth jazz network originated by Jones Radio Networks, and the last satellite smooth jazz radio network in the United States, will be eliminated in consolidation with Dial Global. Jones Standards and Jones Variety Hits will also be discontinued and consolidated with similar Dial Global networks on that day. Additional networks will be consolidated on December 29.
- KBDS/Bakersfield, California. November 14. The Rhythmic Contemporary outlet goes dark due to a decline in advertising sales and a struggling economy in the Bakersfield market.
- The Bob Grant Show. November. Grant's evening show is bumped to make room for Curtis Sliwa's national syndication effort; Grant will continue fill-in work on the station until his contract expires, with the station's midmorning slot (where Sliwa was previously located) still a possibility.
- Interep National Radio Sales. March 31, Declares Chapter 11 bankruptcy. November 25, declares chapter 7 bankruptcy. The agency, which represents radio stations in the United States, goes bankrupt and some of its assets are sold to Katz Media in court the same day.
- The Larry Elder Show. December 12. Elder's contract was not renewed; he had been on KABC in Los Angeles since 1994.
- KDXE. December 18. The Little Rock, Arkansas AM station, a former flagship of Nova M Radio and a pioneer in children's radio, goes silent.
- All Night with Danny Wright. December 29. Wright and five other people are laid off as a result of Dial Global's takeover of Jones Radio, bringing an end to Wright's overnight country music show.

== Deaths ==
- January 6 - Bob Lemond, 95, American radio and television announcer.
- February 7 - Eugene "Rock" Brown, Philanthropist, DJ and Account Executive at WCKX/Columbus, Ohio (gunshot during a misunderstanding at a local bar innocent bystander) Beloved by many
- February 12 - Bill Currie, Radio and TV sportscaster (Sports anchor at KDKA-TV; voice of North Carolina Tar Heels basketball; nicknamed "Mouth of the South")
- February 13 - Jess Cain, morning host at WHDH-AM (at 850; now WEEI) /Boston from 1958 to 1991
- February 27 - Myron Cope, radio play by play commentator for the Pittsburgh Steelers
- March 4 - Fred Horton, program director at multiple stations in New York State
- March 22 - Big Jack Armstrong, disc jockey at over 20 stations in California, Pittsburgh and at WWKB in Buffalo, among others
- March 26 - Wally Phillips, (born 1925), American radio personality best known for hosting WGN's morning radio show from Chicago for 21 years
- April 8 - Gib Shanley, radio play by play commentator for the Cleveland Browns
- May 3 - Lynne Cooper Aurandt, better known as "Angel Harvey," radio producer and writer, wife of radio personality Paul Harvey.
- June 13 - Tim Russert, host of the radio/TV show Meet the Press.
- July 12 - Tony Snow, former talk show host on Fox News Talk and White House Press Secretary
- July 28 - Khia Edgerton, better known as K-swift, DJ/mix-show personality at WERQ/Baltimore, Maryland
- August 8 - Ragan Henry, African-American radio station group owner
- August 9 - Isaac Hayes, recording artist, TV/Film actor, voice actor, Radio DJ
- August 24 - Eloise Kummer, actress in old-time radio, primarily on soap operas.
- September 12 - George Putnam, 94, at the time of his death the oldest nationally syndicated talk radio host in the United States. Putnam was hosting Talk Back on CRN Digital Talk Radio Networks and KCAA.
- September 23 - Ron Allen, 71, long running disc jockey and sports commentator for WARM in Scranton, Pennsylvania.
- September 24 - Dick Lynch, radio color commentator for the New York Giants
- September 28 - John Harden Norris, 88, owner of WGCB-TV. Norris was the center of a dispute over the Fairness Doctrine, one that he eventually lost, in 1964. (see: Red Lion Broadcasting Co. v. Federal Communications Commission)
- October 27 - Dean Barnett, 41, conservative commentator, blogger, occasional fill-in host for Hugh Hewitt.
- November 29 - Bill Drake, 71, Radio programmer, executive, DJ, and co-creator of the "Boss Radio" Top 40 format with partner Gene Chanault.
- December 2 - Edward Samuel Rogers, 75, owner of the Canadian Rogers Communications radio, television and cable empire.
