= KVTT =

Radio station in Mineral Wells–Dallas, Texas

Simulcasts KTCG Sanger
- Mineral Wells, Texas; United States
- Broadcast area: Dallas/Fort Worth Metroplex
- Frequency: 1110 kHz
- Branding: Radio Sangam

Programming
- Language: South Asian
- Format: Full Service

Ownership
- Owner: Saumil and Poorvesh Thakkar; (Decatur Media Land, LLC)
- Sister stations: KZMP-FM

History
- First air date: 1946
- Former call signs: KORC (?–1981); KYXS (1981–1983); KJSA (1983–2009)
- Former frequencies: 1140 kHz (1946–1983); 1120 kHz (1983–2008)
- Call sign meaning: Keep Voicing The Truth (former format)

Technical information
- Licensing authority: FCC
- Facility ID: 31063
- Class: D
- Power: 50,000 watts day 39,000 watts critical hours
- Translator: 95.5 K238CC (Dallas)

Links
- Public license information: Public file; LMS
- Website: telugusangam.net

KVTT (1110 AM) is a commercial radio station licensed to Mineral Wells, Texas and serving the Dallas-Fort Worth Metroplex. It is owned by Saumil and Poorvesh Thakkar, through licensee Decatur Media Land, LLC. It broadcasts a South Asian full service radio format, featuring Bollywood music, talk and news. Studios are located in Richardson along east Belt Line Road.

By day, KVTT is powered at 50,000 watts, the maximum for AM radio stations licensed by the Federal Communications Commission. Because 1110 AM is a clear channel frequency reserved for Class A stations KFAB Omaha and WBT Charlotte, KVTT is a daytimer, required to sign off at night. It runs 39,000 watts during critical hours. The transmitter is southwest of Alvord in Wise County. KVTT is heard around the clock on FM translator K238CC at 95.5 MHz in Dallas.

== History ==
=== Early beginnings & transition ===
This station was first established in 1946 as KFOP, originally on 1140 AM. In 1983, the station was revamped by its former owners Jerry Snyder and Associates to KJSA (for Jerry Snyder and Associates) with an Adult Standards format known as the "Music Of Your Life."

20 years later, it was sold to M&M Broadcasters and it switched to a classic country format known as "The Radio Ranch".

=== Biz Radio affiliation ===
Biz Radio 1110 logo used from 2008 to 2009

The station traded places with KCLE (1120 AM) and on May 24, 2008, KJSA moved from 1120 to 1110 AM and increased daytime power to 20,000 watts. The Houston-based Biz Radio Network moved its broadcasts from KMNY (1360 AM) to KJSA.

Signal testing began in April 2008, with 1360 and 1110 simulcasting BizRadio programming until May 24. That same day, Biz Radio bought the station from M&M Broadcasters, although its previous owners still maintained minor ownership of KJSA. BizRadio also leased KTEK (1110 AM) near Houston, which put their programming on the same 1110 frequency in both markets.

=== Classic country and Spanish ===
On March 2, 2009, Biz Radio moved to KVCE (1160 AM), licensed to Highland Park, citing complaints from listeners that the signal was not audible in much of the immediate DFW metroplex. KJSA switched back to a classic country format, simulcasting from its sister station KHFX in the weeks preceding the Biz Radio move. On April 14, 2009, KJSA dropped its simulcast with KHFX in favor of a Spanish music format.

=== KVTT's move to AM ===
1110 AM KVTT logo used from October 2009 to July 2010.

On September 28, 2009, KJSA began broadcasting a Christian classic/inspirational format by Covenant Educational Media, the former owners of KVTT (91.7 FM, now KKXT), after the sale of the FM frequency to North Texas Public Broadcasting, the owners of KERA radio and KERA-TV. This station formally swapped to the KVTT call sign on October 14, 2009, while the KJSA callsign was warehoused to its former sister station in Palisade, Colorado.

From Covenant's studios in North Dallas, the "Voice of Truth" format included a variety of teaching programs, classic Christian music, and talk programming featuring The Journey with Tom Dooley, The Scott Wilder Show, and Point of View with Kerby Anderson. This format, broadcast since 1976, ceased broadcasting on July 12, 2010, for financial reasons after failing to connect with an audience on their new AM home.

=== 1110 AM today ===
After the demise of the brokered religious format, 1110 AM returned to country music programming, this time airing 1980s and 1990s country with no commercials. On July 27, 2010, the station flipped to a Tejano music format. Later, the station switched over to a classic country format with no talking and no commercials.

In early 2011, KVTT has increased its daytime power to 50,000 watts. On June 14, 2011, M&M Broadcasters sold KVTT to Texoma Broadcasting Inc. for $2.625 Million. On June 14, 2011, KVTT switched to classic country; as of 2014, KVTT has been airing programming catering to the Metroplex's South Asian community.

Effective May 30, 2018, Texoma Broadcasting sold KVTT and translator K238CC to Decatur Media Land, LLC for $1.375 million.

== FM translator ==
Call sign	Frequency	City of license	FID	ERP (W)	HAAT	Class	Transmitter coordinates	FCC info
K238CC	95.5 FM	Dallas, Texas	156287	250	114 m (374 ft)	D	32°53′15.5″N 96°55′25″W	LMS
