= KJSA =

KJSA may refer to:

- KJSA (FM), a radio station (89.7 FM) licensed to serve Jonesboro, Arkansas, United States
- KAAI, a radio station (98.5 FM) licensed to serve Palisade, Colorado, United States, which held the call sign KJSA from 2009 to 2010
