= 1110 AM =

AM radio frequency

The following radio stations broadcast on AM frequency 1110 kHz: 1110 AM is a U.S. clear-channel frequency as defined by the Federal Communications Commission. KFAB Omaha and WBT Charlotte share Class A status on this frequency.

== Argentina ==
- LS1 De La Ciudad in Buenos Aires

== Mexico ==
- XEPVJ-AM in Puerto Vallarta, Jalisco
- XERED-AM in San Jeronimo Tepetla, Mexico City
- XEWR-AM in Ciudad Juárez, Chihuahua

== United States ==
Stations in bold are clear-channel stations.

Call sign	City of license	Facility ID	Class	Daytime power (kW)	Nighttime power (kW)	Critical hours power (kW)	Transmitter coordinates
KAGV	Big Lake, Alaska	129316	B	10	10		61.634167°N 149.793333°W
KAOI	Kihei, Hawaii	70381	B	5	5		20.8225°N 156.454167°W
KBND	Bend, Oregon	9943	B	10	5		44.106944°N 121.244167°W
KEJL	Humble City, New Mexico	48953	D	5		2.5	32.816389°N 103.232222°W
**KFAB**	Omaha, Nebraska	26931	A	50	50		41.119722°N 96.001667°W
KGFL	Clinton, Arkansas	71396	D	5		1	35.558333°N 92.458889°W
KLIB	Roseville, California	57702	B	5	0.5		38.739444°N 121.213889°W
KRPA	Oak Harbor, Washington	74088	D	9	2.5		48.282222°N 122.707222°W
KTEK	Alvin, Texas	10827	D	2.5		2.5	29.380833°N 95.2375°W
KTTP	Pineville, Louisiana	27225	D	2			31.364444°N 92.454167°W
KVTT	Mineral Wells, Texas	31063	D	50		39	33.330278°N 97.735556°W
KWVE	Pasadena, California	25076	B	50	20		34.113889°N 117.9975°W
WBIB	Centreville, Alabama	56372	D	1			32.966944°N 87.150278°W
**WBT**	Charlotte, North Carolina	30830	A	50	50		35.132222°N 80.889722°W
WCBR	Richmond, Kentucky	70617	D	0.34			37.735833°N 84.268056°W
WGNZ	Fairborn, Ohio	36075	D	5	0.002	1.7	39.664722°N 83.943889°W
WJSM	Martinsburg, Pennsylvania	40504	D	1			40.303889°N 78.266389°W
WKDZ	Cadiz, Kentucky	25887	D	0.79			36.8825°N 87.845556°W
WKRA	Holly Springs, Mississippi	5333	D	1			34.786389°N 89.416667°W
WMVX	Salem, New Hampshire	13998	D	5			42.761667°N 71.270278°W
WOMN	Franklinton, Louisiana	22991	D	1			30.859444°N 90.165833°W
WPMZ	East Providence, Rhode Island	4377	D	5			41.827778°N 71.369167°W
WSFW	Seneca Falls, New York	5391	D	1			42.915278°N 76.774444°W
WSLV	Ardmore, Tennessee	3425	D	2.5		1	34.993056°N 86.856111°W
WTBQ	Warwick, New York	22292	D	0.5			41.280833°N 74.362778°W
WTIS	Tampa, Florida	74088	D	10		5.5	27.918333°N 82.395°W
WTOF	Bay Minette, Alabama	24653	D	10		2.5	30.869444°N 87.769167°W
WUAT	Pikeville, Tennessee	10397	D	0.25			35.605°N 85.187222°W
WUNN	Mason, Michigan	20650	D	1			42.551667°N 84.405278°W
WVJP	Caguas, Puerto Rico	6442	B	2.5	0.5		18.223333°N 66.02°W
WWMN	Petoskey, Michigan	63483	D	10	0.01		45.334722°N 84.926111°W
WXES	Chicago, Illinois	65972	D	4.2			41.928056°N 88.006944°W
WYMW	Hurricane, West Virginia	42653	D	1			38.444722°N 82.015°W
