= KKXT =

Radio station in Dallas

Coordinates: 32.590°N 96.973°W

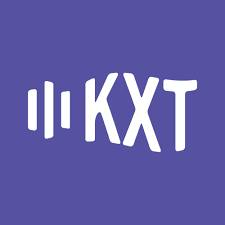

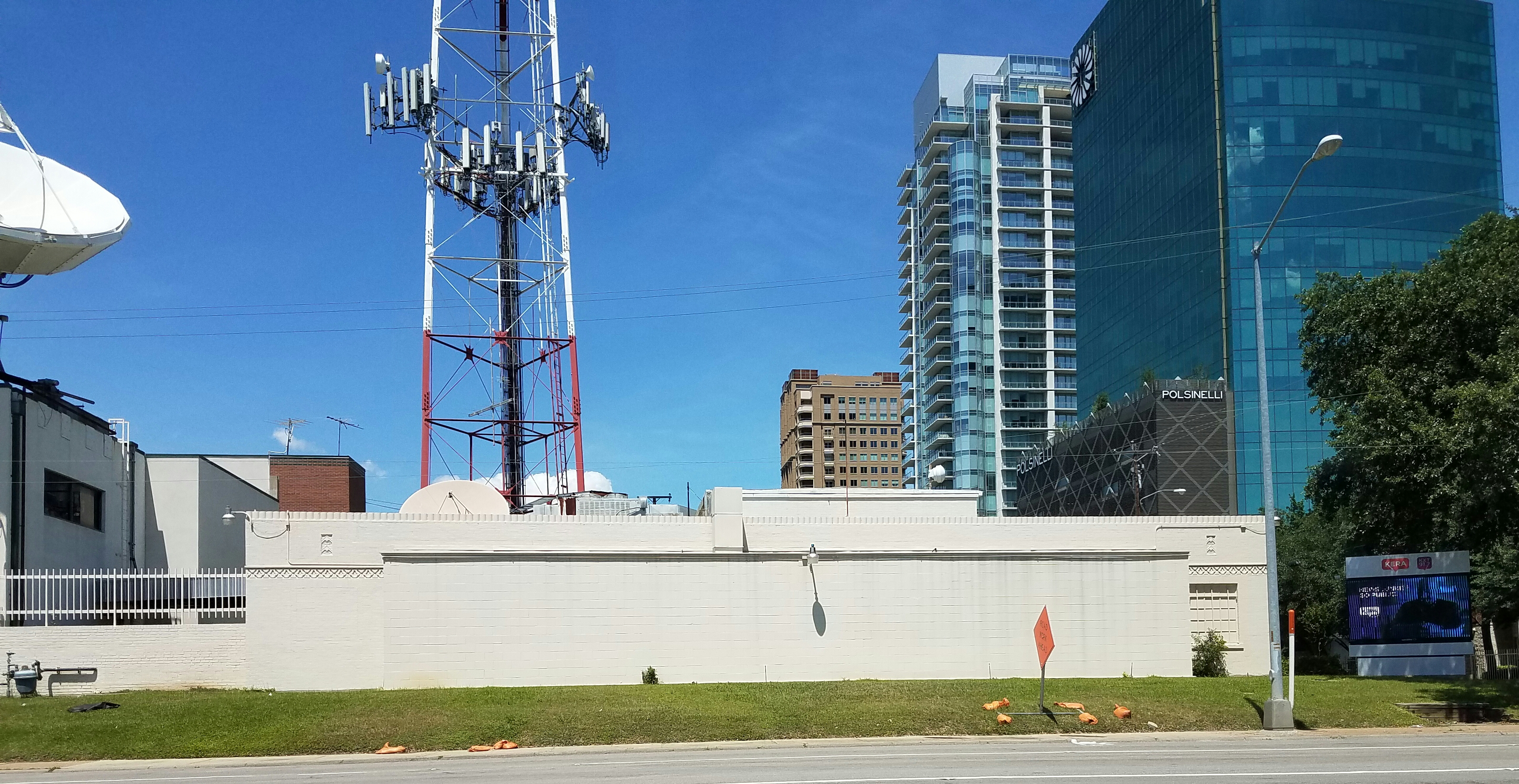
- Site of KKXT's studios and offices, located just north of downtown Dallas. (Its co-owned stations KERA-TV and KERA-FM are also located here.)
- Dallas, Texas; United States
- Broadcast area: Dallas–Fort Worth metroplex
- Frequency: 91.7 MHz (HD Radio)
- RDS: 91.7 KXT
- Branding: 91.7 KXT

Programming
- Language: English
- Format: Adult album alternative (AAA) (Public)
- Affiliations: NPR; American Public Media; Native Voice One; Public Radio Exchange

Ownership
- Owner: North Texas Public Broadcasting
- Sister stations: KERA, KERA-TV, WRR

History
- First air date: January 26, 1950
- Former call signs: KVTT (1950–2009)
- Former frequencies: 88.5 MHz (1950-late 1960s)

Technical information
- Facility ID: 55768
- Class: C
- ERP: 19,290 watts
- HAAT: 571.7 meters (1,876 ft)

Links
- Webcast: Listen Live
- Website: kxt.org

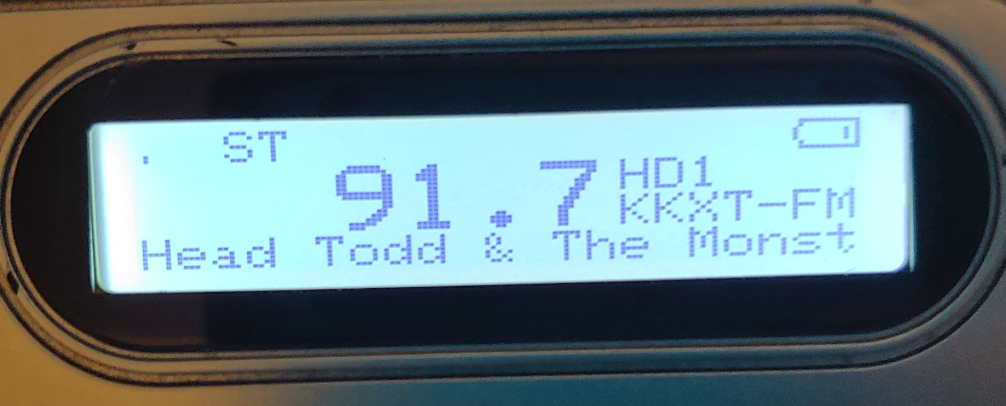
KKXT 91.7 broadcasting in HD.

KKXT (91.7 FM) is a listener-supported public radio station licensed to Dallas, Texas and broadcasting to the Dallas–Fort Worth metroplex. It has a Triple A (adult album alternative) music format with a mix of acoustic, alt-country, indie rock, alternative and world music. It is owned by North Texas Public Broadcasting, which also owns KERA, an NPR news and information network affiliate, and KERA-TV, a PBS affiliate. For branding purposes, KKXT often omits the first "K" in its call sign.

KKXT has an effective radiated power (ERP) of 19,290 watts. Its signal is limited in that most DFW area FM stations run at 100,000 watts. KKXT broadcasts from a tall tower at 571.7 meters (1,876 feet) in height above average terrain (HAAT), the same used by its sister station KERA, which helps improve coverage in the surrounding suburbs of Dallas and Fort Worth. The transmitter is off Tindle Street in Cedar Hill.

== Hosts and Management ==
KXT's program director is Benji McPhail along with air personalities Jackson Wisdorf, Eric Bright, Nilufer Arsala, Jeff Penfield, La Bell, Lesley James and Paul Slavens.

Former hosts include: Brad Dolbeer, Gini Moscorro, Dave Emmert, Allen Roberts, and Mo Barrow.

== Programs ==
The station hosts and promotes local musical events including KXT Sun Sets and KXT 91.7 Present concerts. It brings local and national artists to its studios for KXT's Live Sessions and contributes video content from the sessions to VuHaus, a non-profit digital music video service that introduces emerging and established artists to new audiences.

In-studio performances have featured Chrissie Hynde, Violent Femmes, Lucinda Williams, Steve Earle, Pete Yorn, Sondre Lerche, Guy Clark and Rogue Wave. These sessions have been archived at kxt.org.

KXT airs eTown, American Routes, Tiny Desk Radio, and The Latin Alternative on Sundays. Prior to July 2026, the station also aired World Cafe, a radio show from WXPN Philadelphia, hosted and produced by Talia Schlanger and syndicated by NPR.

Local Dallas-Fort Worth area musician Paul Slavens hosts The Paul Slavens Show, which airs Sunday nights on KXT. The show features a playlist created from audience suggestions.

KXT's weekly New Music Monday series (now known as What's New) introduces listeners to music on the air and online at KXT's blog.

== Concerts ==
KXT hosts several signature concert series including Summer Cut, KXT Sun Sets, the annual KXT anniversary concert (KXT Turns __) and the annual KXT Holiday Concert. Summer Cut is a summer music festival hosted by KXT since 2012 featuring regional and national acts.

KXT Sun Sets is a summer concert series featuring local and national bands in an intimate setting. KXT Sun Sets had its inaugural season in 2016. Performing artists at KXT Sun Sets have included Charley Crockett, Gaston Light, Fantastic Negrito and The Wind + The Wave. The 2017 KXT Sun Sets lineup includes Matisyahu, Beth Ditto, Alejandro Escovedo, Muddy Magnolias, Lolo, Nikki Lane and The Wild Reeds.

KXT Turns __ is an annual anniversary concert celebrating the station's anniversary of broadcasting on the air. KXT also hosts the annual KXT Holiday Concert series. The station also presents many other concerts in the Dallas-Fort Worth area throughout the year. These concerts are branded as "KXT 91.7 Presents."

KXT's concert calendar offers a list of upcoming shows and events in North Texas of interest to KXT listeners.

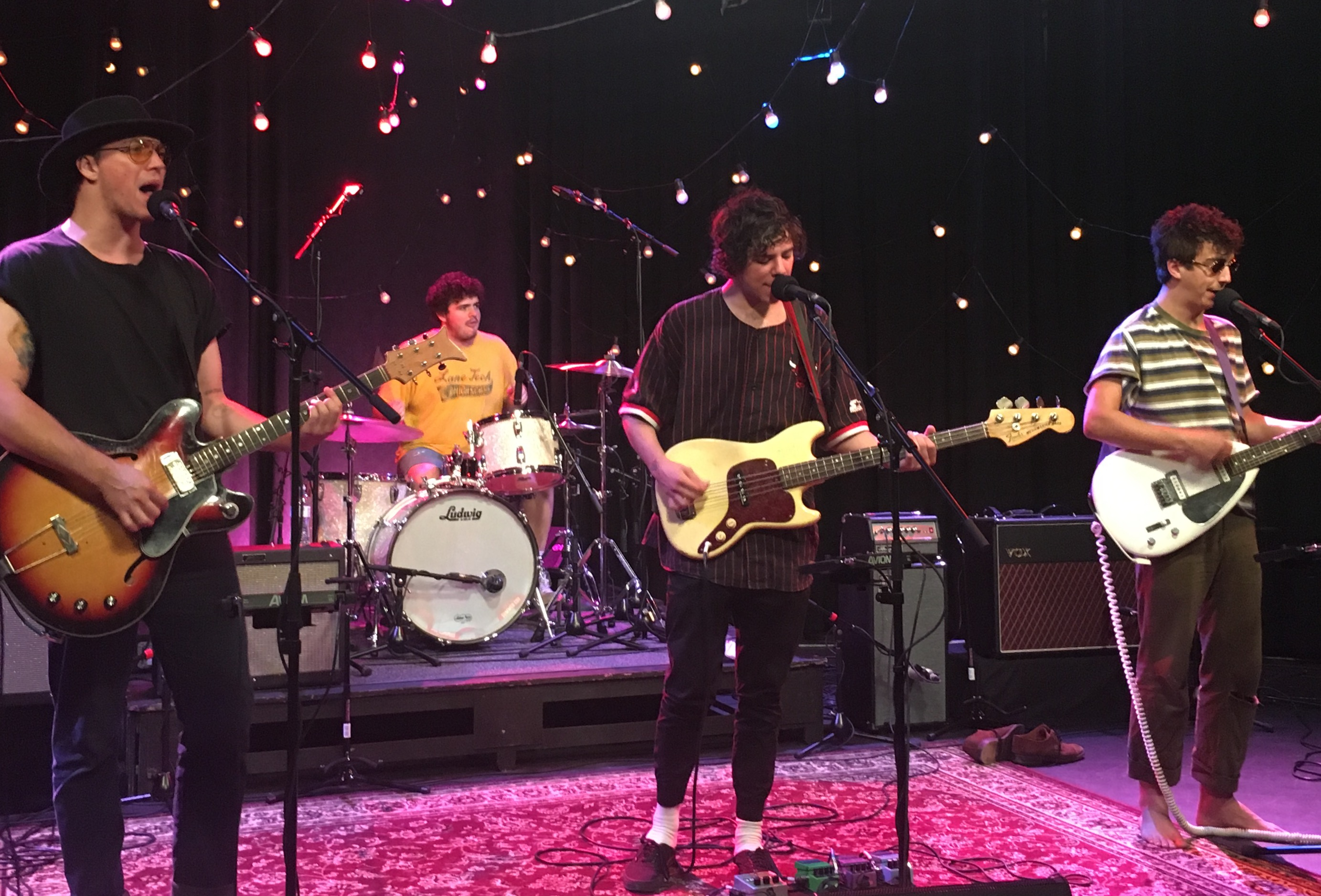
Twin Peaks performed a live session at the KXT studios in September 2016.

== History ==
=== Elkins Institute ===
The station first signed on the air on January 26, 1950. It was owned by the Elkins Institute, at the time known as Texas Trade School. The original frequency was 88.5 MHz and the call letters were KVTT ("The Voice of Texas Trade School"). The school used it as a training ground for students, including Rush Limbaugh, and moved to 91.7 MHz two decades later.

=== Christian format ===
In 1976, Eldred Thomas, the founder of Covenant Educational Media, bought KVTT and turned it into a Christian music and teaching station. Thomas took KVTT's original call letters and created the "Keep Voicing The Truth" tagline. From its studios in North Dallas, it carried a variety of teaching programs, talk shows, and Praise and Worship music, along with a long-running program, The Journey hosted by Tom Dooley.

In July 2001, KVTT license holder Research Educational Foundation, Inc., applied to transfer the broadcast license to The Learning Foundation, Inc. The reported $5 million sale price would have also included the station's donor list for the preceding two years. The transfer was approved by the Federal Communications Commission (FCC) on August 24, 2001, but the deal ultimately fell through. The license remained with the Research Educational Foundation.

In July 2004, Research Educational Foundation, Inc., again applied to transfer the license for KVTT, this time to Covenant Educational Media, Inc. The sale price for this single non-commercial station was reported as $16.5 million. The transfer was approved by the FCC on September 21, 2004, and the transaction was consummated on November 16, 2004.

=== KVTT's failed swap bid ===
In June 2006, KVTT's owners tried to broker a frequency swap with WRR, a commercial radio station owned by the City of Dallas that airs a classical music format. The swap would allow the relocated KVTT to sell commercial advertising to increase its revenue stream.

Even though one official estimated the deal could be worth many millions of dollars to the city of Dallas, the swap was ultimately rejected by city leaders.

=== Sale to KERA ===
Covenant Educational Media announced on June 9, 2009, the station would be sold to North Texas Public Broadcasting, owners of KERA and KERA-TV. The price tag was $18 million. The deal was approved by the FCC on July 30, 2009, and the transaction was consummated on September 28, 2009. It was said to be the biggest single radio station sale to that point in 2009.

The 2008 financial crisis, coupled by a shortfall of donations from its "share-a-thon" and an "urgent" fundraiser, led to the sale of KVTT. The final broadcasting day for the Christian format on 91.7 FM was September 28. On that date, the station moved its Christian programming to a daytime-only station, KJSA 1110 AM. In addition, the station also provided its programming via the internet from its website, kvtt.org. The KVTT call sign was then transferred to Covenant's sister station in Palisade, Colorado, KAAI, on October 1, 2009. On October 14, 2009, the KVTT call sign returned to the DFW area on the AM station formerly licensed as KJSA.

=== KKXT Debuts ===
On October 1, 2009, the 91.7 frequency became "KKXT", and the station temporarily went silent for a month-long transition. Programming under the moniker "KXT 91.7" began on November 9. The format flip to adult album alternative also occurred on that date.

Music programs formerly heard on KERA FM moved to 91.7, including 90.1 at Night, which was renamed as The Paul Slavens Show .

KXT was named the Metroplex's "Best Music Radio Station" by the Dallas Observer in 2016.

As of early February 2017, KXT began broadcasting a digital signal using the iBiquity "HD Radio" system. On October 2, 2017, KXT relaunched its positioning statement as "The Republic of Music", with a greater emphasis on local artists, and revamped the station's daily schedule.
