= KWFT (disambiguation) =

KWFT may refer to:

- Kenya Women Microfinance Bank, microfinance bank in Kenya.

== US broadcasting ==
- KWFT-LD, a low-power television station (channel 6) licensed to Fort Smith, Arkansas, United States
- KXNW, a television station (channel 25/PSIP 34) licensed to Eureka Springs, Arkansas, United States, which held the call sign KWFT from 2004 to 2006
- KFCD, a radio station (990 AM) licensed to Farmersville, Texas, United States, which held the call sign KWFT from 1995 to 1998
- KTNO (Plano, Texas), a radio station (620 AM) licensed to Plano, Texas, United States, which held the call sign KWFT from 1939 to 1995
- KAUZ-TV, a television station (channel 22/PSIP 6) licensed to Wichita Falls, Texas, United States, which held the call sign KWFT-TV from 1953 to 1956
