= KFCD =

Radio station in Farmersville–Dallas, Texas

Coordinates: 33°7′1″N 96°16′47″W

- Farmersville, Texas; United States
- Broadcast area: Dallas-Fort Worth Metroplex; Sherman– Denison
- Frequency: 990 kHz

Programming
- Language: Spanish
- Format: Brokered; Christian radio

Ownership
- Owner: Linda Hammond; (Farmersville Investments, LLC)

History
- First air date: April 6, 1948 (Note: In Wichita Falls; moved to Farmersville in 2002.)
- Former call signs: KFDF (April–October 1947); KFDX (1947–1955); KSYD (1955–1961); KNIN (1961–1983, 1991–1995); KGTM (1983–1990); KKCR (1990–1991); KWFT (1995–1998); KTUB (1998–2000); KXXL (2000–2002); KCAF (2002–2004); KMSR (2004)
- Call sign meaning: FC Dallas (former team flagship)

Technical information
- Licensing authority: FCC
- Facility ID: 43757
- Class: B
- Power: 7,000 watts day; 920 watts night
- Translator: 99.9 K260CX (McKinney)

Links
- Public license information: Public file; LMS

KFCD (990 AM) is a commercial radio station in Farmersville, Texas. It is owned by Linda Hammond, through licensee Farmersville Investments, LLC, and airs a Spanish-language Christian radio format. Blocks of time are sold to hosts who may use their shows to appeal for donations to their ministries. The system is known as brokered programming.

KFCD is powered at 7,000 watts by day. But at night, to avoid interfering with other stations on 990 AM, power is reduced to 920 watts. Programming is also heard on FM translator K260CX at 99.9 MHz in McKinney, Texas.

== History ==
The station started out in 1948 in Wichita Falls, Texas, as KFDX. During the 1960s and 1970s, it was K-Nine (KNIN), a popular Top 40 station during the 1960s and 1970s. After several format and call letter changes during the 1980s and 1990s, the station moved to Farmersville as KCAF Cafe 990, with a short-lived women's talk format. Two months later, it changed to conservative talk via Radio America. The name, however stayed the same. "Cafe 990" has the unenviable distinction of having the shortest run of any regular format in Dallas–Fort Worth radio history, signing off the format after just three days, due to monetary problems involved with the owners of the station. After Cafe 990 signed off, Radio America programming resumed.

In 2004, the station changed its call letters to KMSR while maintaining its talk format, but that December, the station was re-imaged as KFCD. A year later, KFCD was transferred to the bankruptcy court appointed "debtor-in-possession" along with sister station KHSE.

Starting on January 15, 2007, the frequency began broadcasting sports talk radio. In the opinion of Dallas Observer blogger Richie Whitt, the new format was "destined to fail". While the call sign references FC Dallas, the region's Major League Soccer team, FC Dallas games no longer air on KFCD. KFCD was a network affiliate radio station for the Frisco RoughRiders, and a Class AA affiliate of the Texas Rangers major league baseball club. The station lasted with a sports talk format until October 29, 2007, when it abruptly switched to a gospel music format.

As of November 29, 2009, KFCD became a 24-hour affiliate of the Biz Radio Network. Biz Radio was previously affiliated with KVCE which only carried a partial schedule intermixed with conservative and Pakistan/Indian talk programs. KFCD provided a stronger signal in the city of Dallas than KVCE, but signal quality is generally poorer than KVCE in Fort Worth due in part to the lower transmitter power of KFCD and location of transmission tower east of Dallas.

On January 1, 2010, KFCD returned to its prior religious and talk programming and the Biz Radio network moved to its former location at KMNY. Among specialty programs during this format's era was "ilume-A-Nation Radio", a weekly show hosted by Jack E. Jett, consisting of guilty pleasure songs.

As of June 8, 2013, KFCD has aired a brokered format, featuring mainly Spanish language programming.

== Ownership ==
On December 28, 2006, the Federal Communications Commission (FCC) accepted a voluntary license transfer from DFW Radio License, LLC to Bernard Dallas LLC. On February 27, 2007, an application was filed with the FCC to transfer the license from Bernard Dallas LLC to Principle Broadcasting Network - Dallas, LLC, which has entered into a transaction to acquire the two stations from the bankruptcy court. The FCC approved the sale February 19, 2008, denying a formal Petition to Deny, filed by parties seeking to stop the sale. A series of further filings resulted in the objectors being admonished by the commission for "frivolous and obstructive pleadings" on May 28, 2009. However, the transaction was never consummated.

Effective October 30, 2015, Bernard Dallas LLC sold KFCD and sister station KHSE to Mark Jorgenson's ACM Dallas V LLC for $475,000. Jorgenson then sold KFCD to Vikram Shah Broadcasting, Inc. effective December 3, 2015 for $800,000.

Effective October 29, 2019, Vikram Shah Broadcasting sold KFCD and translator K260CX to Linda Hammond's Farmersville Investments, LLC for $2 million.
