= J. Paul Slavens =

- Born: May 20, 1962 (age 64); Dakota City, Nebraska, U.S.
- Origin: Denton, Texas, U.S.
- Genre: New
- Occupations: Songwriter, musician, producer
- Instruments: Piano, keyboards, vocals
- Years active: 1962–present
- Member of: Ten Hands

J. Paul Slavens is an American composer and musician based in Denton, Texas. He plays piano and keyboards along with many other instruments, primarily in the Dallas/Fort Worth/Denton area but has toured nationally with several bands, including Ten Hands, Baptist Generals, The Travoltas and others. In addition to regularly composing and playing live music, Paul produces a weekly radio show on KXT in Dallas.

== Biography ==
J.Paul Slavens was born May 20, 1962, to J. Phil and Marion F. Slavens in Dakota City, Nebraska, and graduated from South Sioux City High School. He then attended Morningside College in Sioux City, Iowa, receiving a BM in Piano Performance. He then moved to Denton, Texas, to pursue a Graduate Degree in Computer Aided Music Theory from NTSU (UNT).

== Musical career ==
=== Early years ===
He began taking piano lessons at age 9 and began composing music almost immediately. His siblings also took lessons and he wrote his first songs with his older sister Karen while still in Jr. High School. Always active in band, choir and theater he won awards for acting in high school and was offered a Theater Scholarship to Morningside College in Sioux City, Iowa. He decided to pursue music instead and received a BM in Piano Performance in 1984. While at college he performed in a "progressive" rock band called Onyx for which he composed most of the music. The band played mostly in the Sioux City area opening for bands such as Steppenwolf, Vixen and John Cougar Mellencamp. The group disbanded when Slavens moved to Denton, Texas, to study Music Theory and NTSU (UNT).

Upon moving to Texas he continued to compose and play in bands. It was in one of these groups named The Gonemen that he met future Ten Hands guitarist Steve Brand. When that group dissolved Brand and Slavens teamed up with Gary Muller, Matt Chamberlain and Mike Dillon to form Ten Hands.

=== Ten Hands ===
In 1987, Paul was one of the founding members of Ten Hands, a Denton, Texas-based rock band. Although he completed his course work, activities with Ten Hands kept him from completing his thesis. He played with Ten Hands for nearly a decade, playing frequently throughout the Southwest and releasing several albums for which he was keyboardist, lead vocalist and primary songwriter. Ten Hands and Slavens have released 5 albums and won numerous Dallas Observer Music Awards in various categories.

=== Solo artist ===
In 1997 Slavens released an album of piano solo compositions called Absolutes. The Absolutes are piano solo works, often born of improvisations captured initially on computer sequencer and edited later. He created a large body of recorded work throughout the years, although these home recordings were mostly unreleased, until 2016 when he began releasing them on Bandcamp under the title Juvenilia. At present there are 10 albums in this archival series with several more to be released. The music composed and recorded during these years c.1984-94 run the gamut from classical fugues to electronic soundscapes and humorous pieces as well as a large number of songs in various styles.

Slavens was also inspired by the jazz music he was exposed to in Denton, NTSU (UNT) being the home of the first university-level jazz music program in America. He composed a collection of "heads" called the Texclectic Songbook, and many of the pieces in the collection Alphabet Girls also fall in the jazz category.

In the mid-1990s, Slavens began creating improvisational songs based on audience suggestions, and has created an estimated 2000 songs over the last 2 decades; many recordings exist, although few have been released. Often these songs are humorous in nature and can be quite ribald.

In 2014 Slavens teamed up with Danielle Georgiou Dance Group (DGDG) to create the work NICE. It had a sold out run at the Wylie Theater in Dallas Texas. The piece was part of the AT&T Performing Arts Center's Elevator Project, a series highlighting smaller theater and dance companies. It was also performed at the Out of the Loop Festival at the Watertower Theater in Addison TX. An Album of the music is planned for release in 2017.

Slavens has also performed his score for the silent movie The Hunchback of Notre Dame at several venues, notably The Dallas Museum of Art, The Greenzone Theater in Dallas, Club Dada in Dallas, The Grapevine Palace Theater in Grapevine Tx and The Cinnabar Theater in Petaluma, CA. The score for the Lon Chaney classic film utilized leit motif, parody and is largely improvisational, it has been performed by groups from 4 to 12 members.

Slavens also participated in presentation of a special screening of D. W. Griffith’s classic silent film WAY DOWN EAST, sponsored by The Lone Star Film Society (LSFS), in partnership with the Kimbell Art Museum, in March 2014. The piece was largely improvisational and was co-created by Buffi Jacobs and Bach Norwood, both members of the music group The Polyphonic Spree.

=== Green Romance Orchestra ===
After several of the original members of Ten Hands left the band Slavens and Ten Hands stick player Gary Muller suspended Ten Hands and joined The Green Romance Orchestra, a group put together by former Pearl Jam drummer Dave Abbruzzese. The group put out one full-length release on Emperor Norton Records.

=== Camera, voice talent, theater and radio ===
During this time Slavens was taken on by Kim Dawson Talent Agency in Dallas Texas as an on camera actor and voice talent. Slavens also studied improvisational comedy with former Groundlings member Randy Bennet and became the musical director for the Fort Worth improv group Four Day Weekend, with whom he performed for several years before leaving to pursue his own musical improv show. While with Four Day Weekend he produced a live music and improv theater production called The Texclectic Radio Hour and a Half. The show was occasionally sponsored by Dallas NPR affiliate KERA and in 2004 Slavens was taken on as a host for the long-running 90.1 @ Night show on Sunday evenings. Slavens retooled the format to great success. When KERA purchased another station KKXT in 2008 and designated it as a music station, Slavens moved over to that station and the show became The Paul Slavens Show.

He still does the show Sunday evenings and has won multiple awards for it. Slavens has performed with many bands and musicians in North Texas including The Baptist Generals (SubPop) and Robert Gomez (Bella Union). He is currently playing with Ten Hands, Baptist Generals and The Travoltas with Dallas musician/producer Salim Nourallah. He is also well known for his unique style of live improvisational song creation which he performs regularly.

== Discography ==
- Ten Hands: Kung Fu.. That's What I Like
- Ten Hands: The Big One Is Coming
- Ten Hands: The Big One That Got Away
- Ten Hands: Be My Guru
- Ten Hands: Jazz For Jerks
- Baptist Generals: Jack Leg Devotional To The Heart (SubPop)
- Robert Gomez : New Towns (Bella Union)
- Green Romance Orchestra: Plays Parts I & V (Emperor Norton)
- The Travoltas: The Travoltas
- Paul Slavens: Absolutes
- PSlavens: Alphabet Girls vol. I
- PSlavens: Juvenilia: Guitar
- PSlavens: Juvenilia: Song Songs vol 1
- PSlavens: Juvenilia:Song Songs vol 2
- PSlavens: Juvenilia:Journeys
- PSlavens: Juvenilia:Jamstojamto
- PSlavens: Juvenilia:Der Freak Zone
- PSlavens: Juvenilia:The Castell Session
- PSlavens: Juvenilia:Fugues and Such
- PSlavens: Juvenilia:Relaxation Music
- PSlavens: Juvenilia:Extreme Relaxation Music
