= KZMP =

KZMP may refer to:

- KZMP-FM, a radio station (104.9 FM) licensed to serve Pilot Point, Texas, United States
- KAMM (AM), a radio station (1540 AM) licensed to serve University Park, Texas, which held the call sign KZMP from 1997 to 2023
