= 1925 in radio =

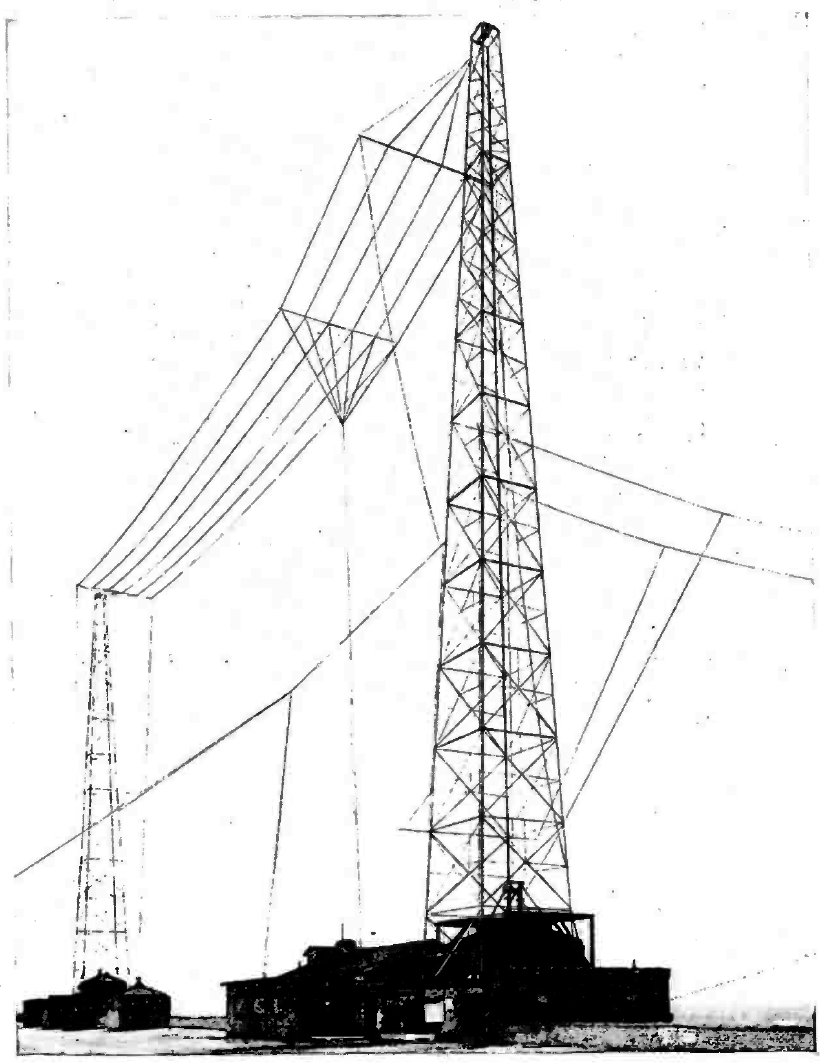

The year 1925 saw a number of significant events in radio broadcasting history.

== Events ==
- 1 January – In Sweden, AB Radiotjänst (forerunner of Sveriges Radio) broadcasts its first programme.
- 27 January – Australia's second oldest surviving radio station, 2HD, goes on air for the first time in Newcastle, New South Wales.
- 1 February – The Polish Radiotechnical Society (Polskie Towarzystwo Radiotechniczne, PTR) makes its first official broadcast from Warsaw.
- 22 February – First radio transmission of a religious service in Denmark, from the Garrison Church, Copenhagen.
- 4 March – Second inauguration of Calvin Coolidge as President of the United States, the first inauguration to be broadcast.
- 8 March – Westinghouse Electric, owner of KDKA among other stations, announces from its Pittsburgh headquarters a proposal to form "radio networks" via shortwave technology.
- 22 March – JOAK, NHK Radio One of Tokyo, an official inauguration service start, and a first license radio station in Japan.
- 1 April – In Denmark, Radioordningen (Statsradiofonien from 1926, Danmarks Radio from 1959) is established.
- 23 April – KRO (the Katholieke Radio Omroep) is established in the Netherlands.
- 15 May – Reichs-Rundfunk-Gesellschaft established in Berlin as an umbrella organisation by nine German regional broadcasters.
- 1 June – JOBK, NHK Radio One of Osaka, an official inauguration service start in Japan.
- 17 June – In Spain, Unión Radio opens station EAJ-7 Radio Madrid.
- 7 July – Inauguration in France of state radio station Marseille PTT.
- 15 July – JOCK, NHK Radio One of Nagoya, an official inauguration service start in Japan.
- 27 July – The British Broadcasting Company's Daventry transmitting station on Borough Hill, Daventry in central England opens as the world's first longwave broadcast radio transmitter, taking over from its Chelmsford facility.
- 25 September – The Berliner Funkturm (Berlin Radio Tower) begins transmissions.
- 1 November – VARA (the Vereeniging van Arbeiders Radio Amateurs) is established in the Netherlands.
- 16 December – Colombo Radio is launched in Ceylon; the station subsequently becomes known as Radio Ceylon.
- In Norway, broadcasting company Kringkastingsselskapet begins operating from Oslo.

== Debuts ==
- 14 January – First broadcast on Swedish national radio (AB Radiotjänst) of one of the world's longest-running radio programmes, Barnens brevlåda ("Children's letterbox"), which will run for 1,785 editions – all presented by "Uncle Sven" (the radio sports commentator Sven Jerring) – until 1972.
- 21 March – Lowell Thomas is first heard on the radio on Pittsburgh station KDKA.
- 31 March – Radio station WOWO in Fort Wayne, Indiana begins broadcasting.
- 8 April – Station WADC commences regular programming in Akron, Ohio. It had debuted earlier (in February 1925) as a temporary station during a car show held at the Central Garage, the call letters standing for the station's sponsor, the Automotive Dealers Company. Known from 2 June 2005 as WARF, it becomes Akron's oldest surviving radio station.
- 23 September – In Decatur IL, WJBL signs on, now referred to as WSOY.
- 4 October – The Atwater Kent Hour debuts on WEAF and 10 other connected stations.
- 5 October – WSM signs on in Nashville, Tennessee.
- 15 November – First transmission from Radio RV-10 in the Byelorussian Soviet Socialist Republic (modern-day Belarus).
- 28 November – The weekly country music-variety program Grand Ole Opry is first broadcast on WSM radio in Nashville, Tennessee, as the "WSM Barn Dance".
- 24 December – KMOX begins broadcasting in St. Louis, Missouri.

== Closings ==
- April – WGI-Medford Hillside, Massachusetts declares bankruptcy and shuts down for good; this leaves WBZ-Springfield as the oldest surviving station in New England.
- Undated – WAAB 1150 AM ceases broadcasting. 1150 AM will return the next year as WJBO.

== Births ==
- 17 February – Joy Nichols, Australian-born musical comedy performer (d. 1992)
- 2 April – Hans Rosenthal, German radio editor, director and media host (d. 1987)
- 25 April – Janete Clair, Brazilian broadcast play and novel writer (d. 1983)
- 15 May – Regis Cordic, American radio personality and actor (d. 1999)
- 25 May – Derek Cooper, English food writer and broadcaster (d. 2014)
- 15 June – Richard Baker, English broadcaster (d. 2018)
- 7 July – Wally Phillips, American radio personality (d. 2008)
- 14 July – Pip Freedman, South African radio comedian and film actor (d. 2003)
- 8 September – Peter Sellers, English comic actor (d. 1980)
- 19 September – Pete Murray, English DJ
- 22 September – William Franklyn, English actor (d. 2006)
- 28 September – Jerry Clower, American country music comedian (d. 1998)
- 27 October – Monica Sims, British radio executive (d. 2018)
- 31 October – Shirley Dinsdale, American ventriloquist (d. 1999)
- 11 November – June Whitfield, English comic actress (d. 2018)
