= Ten Hands =

American rock band

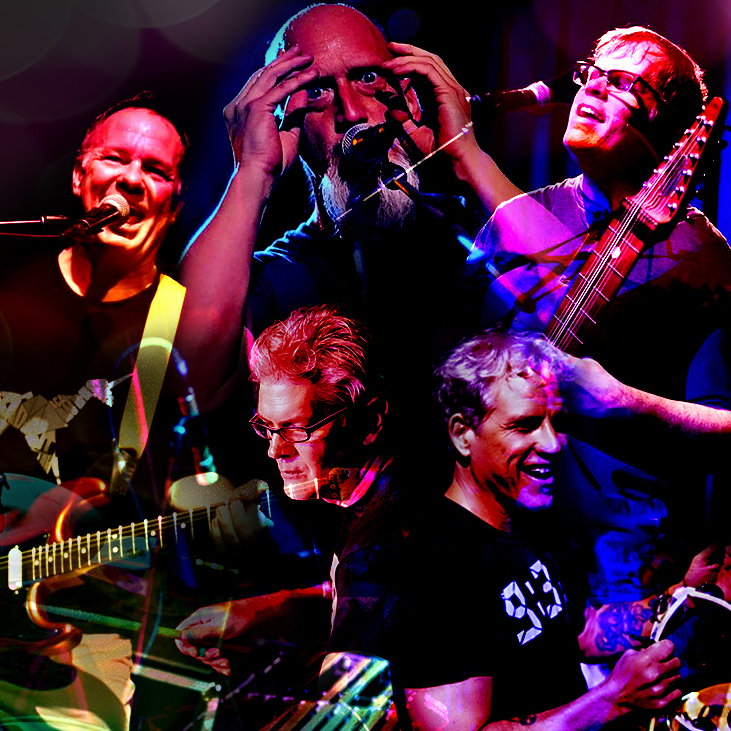
- Ten Hands 2018

Background information
- Origin: Dallas, Texas, United States
- Genres: Rock, funk, alternative
- Years active: 1986–present
- Labels: ESG Records, Slipped Disc, Clubland Records
- Members: J. Paul Slavens; Steve Brand; Gary Muller "BIG" Al Emert; Mike Dillon
- Past members: Earl Harvin; Matt Chamberlain; Ed McMahon; Greg Beck; Chris Claridy; Chad Rueffer; Joe Cripps; Pete Wilson; Matt Thompson
- Website: http://tenhandsmusic.com

Ten Hands is a rock band based in Denton, Texas, United States. The band consists of:

- J. Paul Slavens (keyboards, lead vocals),
- Steve Brand (guitar, backing vocals),
- Gary Muller (Chapman stick, backing vocals),
- Mike Dillon (percussion, backing vocals),
- Alan Emert (drums, backing vocals).

Described as a cross between the jazz-rock-art style of Frank Zappa and the psychedelic punk of the Meat Puppets, Ten Hands had a style that was better appreciated live, more so than in the studio. The late 1980s local scene adored them and the Dallas Observer awarded Ten Hands numerous accolades in 1988-1989.

The band performed regularly from the mid 1980s through 1995. Since 2014, they have been playing regular shows several times a year in the Dallas area, with various lineups.

== Discography ==
Year	Title	Label
1988	Kung Fu ... That's What I Like	ESG
1989	The Big One Is Coming (live)	ESG
1992	Be My Guru	Slipped Disc
1993	Jazz For Jerks	Clubland
1996	The Big One That Got Away (live)	Clubland
