= KDTN =

Television station in Denton, Texas

KDTN and KPTD-LP
KDTN: Denton–Dallas–Fort Worth, Texas; KPTD-LP: Paris, Texas; United States
- Channels for KDTN: Digital: 29 (UHF), shared with KPTD-LP; Virtual: 2
- Channels for KPTD-LP: Digital: 29 (UHF), shared with KDTN; Virtual: 51

Programming
- Affiliations: 2.1: Daystar; 2.2: Daystar Español; 51.1: Daystar Reflections

Ownership
- Owner: Daystar Television Network; (Community Television Educators of DFW, Inc./Word of God Fellowship, Inc.)

History
- Founded: KPTD-LP: 2004
- First air date: KDTN: September 1, 1988; KPTD-LP: August 7, 2007
- Former call signs: KPTD-LP: K49II (CP, 2004–2007)
- Former channel number: KDTN: Analog: 2 (VHF, 1988–2009); Digital: 43 (UHF, 2004–2019); KPTD-LP: Analog: 49 (UHF, 2007–2019)
- Former affiliations: KDTN: PBS (1988–2004)
- Call sign meaning: KDTN: Denton; -or-; Daystar Television Network

Technical information
- Licensing authority: FCC
- Facility ID: KDTN: 49326; KPTD-LP: 131126
- Class: KPTD-LP: LD
- ERP: 415 kW
- HAAT: 494 m (1,621 ft)
- Transmitter coordinates: 32°35′22″N 96°58′12.9″W

Links
- Public license information: KDTN: Public file; LMS; KPTD-LP: Public file; LMS
- Website: www.daystar.com

KDTN (channel 2) is a religious television station licensed to Denton, Texas, United States, serving the Dallas–Fort Worth metroplex as the flagship outlet of the Daystar Television Network. The station's studios are co-located with Daystar headquarters off SH 121 in Bedford, and its transmitter is located on Tar Road in Cedar Hill, just south of the Dallas–Ellis county line. It is operated separately from sister station KPTD-LP (channel 51) in Paris, Texas, which shares spectrum with full-power KDTN despite being licensed as a low-power station.

== History ==
=== KIXL and KDNT ===
In 1948, Variety Broadcasting, owned by Lee Segall), which already had KIXL 1040 AM (now KGGR) and 104.5 KIXL-FM (now KKDA-FM) wanted to add a television station. Variety applied to the Federal Communications Commission (FCC) for a construction permit to build a television station on VHF channel 2, which would have been KIXL-TV. However, the station was never granted, and ultimately never launched.

By the time the FCC lifted its freeze on new television station license applications in 1952, the channel 2 allocation had been reassigned to Denton as a non-commercial educational channel. This did not stop Harwell V. Shepard, the owner of KDNT 1440 AM (now KEXB) and KDNT-FM 106.1 (now KHKS), from applying for a commercial license for the station. The application was declined, as other applicants insisted to the FCC that the VHF channel 2 allocation remain designated as an educational station.

KDTN logo, used from 1988 to 2000.

=== KERA-TV ===
North Texas Public Broadcasting, owner of PBS member station KERA-TV, operating on channel 13, first expressed interest in establishing a secondary educational television station on channel 2 in May 1977. Several other groups applied for the allocation and a long fight for a construction permit ensued with the FCC. After several other applicants dropped out, KERA-TV worked out an agreement with the lone remaining applicant in 1984 to gain the right to put the station on the air.

As part of the agreement, KERA constructed a studio facility on the campus of the University of North Texas in Denton for the new station, which was given the call letters KDTN (in reference to its city of license), and agreed to run some programs produced by the university. The station first signed on the air on September 1, 1988. KERA used the station primarily to run educational and instructional programs that had previously filled much of KERA's daytime schedule. Channel 13 then shifted to offering primarily entertainment programming from PBS and other public television distributors. Originally branded as "KDTN 2", the station was rebranded as "KERA 2" in the early 2000s, although it still had the KDTN call letters. Programs that have aired on KDTN during its tenure as a PBS station included The Joy of Painting, Sewing with Nancy, Sit and Be Fit, Plaza Sésamo (the Spanish counterpart of Sesame Street), This Old House, and occasional drama series such as Upstairs, Downstairs from ITV.

=== Daystar ===
In 2003, North Texas Public Broadcasting decided that running a second television station in the Metroplex was no longer financially wise, especially with digital television allowing stations to use subchannels for alternate programming. The organization placed KDTN up for sale. This gave religious broadcast network Daystar an opportunity to get a better signal in the market. As a result, Daystar sold its original flagship station KMPX (channel 29, now independent station KFAA-TV). The acquisition by Daystar was finalized on January 13, 2004. During KDTN's last two days as a PBS member station before Daystar officially took ownership, the station ran marathons of The Joy of Painting and the entire run of Upstairs, Downstairs.

By special arrangement, KERA announced plans at the time to continue carrying programming sourced from the station on KDTN's digital signal, to free up bandwidth on KERA's main digital signal to allow the station to upgrade its main channel to transmit programming in high definition. As of 2018, improvements in multiplexer technology have allowed KERA-TV to use the channel 13 spectrum exclusively, and both stations now control their own allocations in full.

In August 2019, as part of the broadcast frequency repacking process following the 2016–2017 FCC incentive auction, the Daystar affiliate in Paris, Texas, KPTD-LP, shut down its low-power analog channel 49 transmitter, and began channel sharing on KDTN's transmitter. While KDTN's signal does not reach Paris, Texas, the city is part of the Dallas–Fort Worth media market.

== Technical information ==
=== Subchannels ===
Subchannels of KDTN and KPTD-LP
License	Subchannel	Res.	Short name	Programming
KDTN	2.1	1080i	KDTN-DT	Daystar
KDTN	2.2	720p	KDTN-ES	Daystar Español
KPTD-LP	51.1	480i	KPTD-LD	Daystar Reflections

=== Analog-to-digital conversion ===
KDTN shut down its analog signal, over VHF channel 2, on April 30, 2009. The station's digital signal remained on its pre-transition UHF channel 43, using virtual channel 2.
