= KMNY =

Radio station in Hurst, Texas

Coordinates: 32°47′06″N 96°57′15″W

- Hurst, Texas; United States
- Broadcast area: Dallas–Fort Worth metroplex
- Frequency: 1360 kHz
- Branding: La Voz 1360 AM

Programming
- Format: Spanish; Christian radio

Ownership
- Owner: Multicultural Broadcasting; (Multicultural Radio Broadcasting Licensee, LLC)
- Sister stations: KDFT

History
- First air date: 1947
- Former call signs: KXOL (1947–1985); KWJS (1985–1988); KNRB (1988–1993); KAHZ (1993–2005)
- Call sign meaning: Money (previous business format)

Technical information
- Licensing authority: FCC
- Facility ID: 10825
- Class: B
- Power: 50,000 watts (day)]; 890 watts (night)

Links
- Public license information: Public file; LMS
- Website: Official website

KMNY (1360 kHz) is a commercial AM radio station licensed to Hurst, Texas, and serving the Dallas–Fort Worth metroplex. It is owned by Multicultural Broadcasting and broadcasts a Spanish-language Christian radio format known as "La Voz 1360." KMNY uses a brokered programming approach, where preachers buy blocks of time on the station and can ask for donations during their shows to support their ministries.

By day, it is powered at 50,000 watts, the maximum for AM radio stations licensed by the Federal Communications Commission. But at night, to protect other stations on 1360 AM, it reduces power to 890 watts. While the daytime signal covers the Metroplex, the nighttime signal is limited to a smaller area west of Dallas. KMNY uses a directional antenna at all times, employing a six-tower array after sunset. The transmitter is off MacArthur Boulevard in Grand Prairie, Texas.

== History ==
=== The early years ===
In April 1947, the station signed on as KXOL, originally licensed in Fort Worth. The first voice ever heard live over the air was that of disc jockey, and later actor, Norman Alden. It featured a variety of entertainment programs and country music during its early years. From 1956 to 1976, KXOL played Top 40 music, competing with 1270 KFJZ for youthful listeners. Station personalities during the late 1950s included comedians George Carlin and Jack Burns.

With the rise of FM radio and a decrease in ratings and revenue after the combination of Dallas and Fort Worth into one radio market, KXOL switched back to country music in 1976. In the early 1980s, KXOL also carried the weekend editions of the Texas Night Train and Wonderful Radio London programs, which were heard full-time on Mexican border blaster station XERF AM 1570.

Other than the special weekend programming, KXOL continued as a country station until it was sold in 1985 and became KWJS, featuring Christian radio programming. KWJS became KNRB on June 1, 1988, featuring country and then religious formats.

=== Children's Radio ===
It became KAHZ on September 24, 1993, airing children's programming from the Radio AAHS network. After Radio AAHS discontinued operations in January 1998, Children's Broadcasting Corporation, KAHZ's owner, needed programming for the network of stations until the company could find buyers. The station, along with the other nine CBC-owned and operated Radio AAHS affiliates, flipped to "Beat Radio", which played electronic dance music 12 hours each night until late October 1998.

KAHZ switched to Catholic religious programming in 1998 and later to Spanish-language talk programming.

=== Biz Radio Network ===
The KMNY call sign began to be used on March 4, 2005. A business talk format debuted the following month as KMNY Biz Radio 1360. Nighttime slots were filled with brokered programming in Spanish, Chinese and other languages, or automated adult standards music during non-sponsored times.

Beginning in 2006, KMNY began airing "The Hi-Fi Club". It was a live, weekly oldies/talk show that resurrected its name from KXOL's "Coca Cola Hi-Fi Club", heard 1959–62 and originally hosted by comedian George Carlin. Hosts Mike Shannon, John Lewis Puff, and Ray Whitworth covered historic local and national events, along with local radio and television history, regularly breaking an unwritten rule by discussing competing area stations by name. Offbeat and candid in nature, it also features live and recorded interviews with historical local radio notables such as Norman Alden, Bob Schieffer, Bud Buschardt, George Gimarc, Jack Burns, Russ Bloxom and Bob Allen.

In November 2006, "The Hi-Fi Club" presented the radio special, "As it Happened: The Lost JFK Assassination Tapes of KXOL-1360" over KMNY. This was a two-hour compilation of audio recordings from KXOL, mostly in the post-assassination hours and continuing into the early morning of 11/23/1963. The recordings were edited from reels provided by KXOL newsman Russ Bloxom, who was on duty at the station's newsdesk when President John F. Kennedy was killed, and had never been replayed. "The Hi-Fi Club" reunited the recordings with their original frequency, and Russ Bloxom provided a new five-minute interview as part of the presentation. An edited version of the presentation aired over KMNY on November 23, 2008.

In January 2007, the station aired a sports talk show titled "Sports Kings".

=== Progressive Talk and Retro Radio ===
In January 2008, the station began airing progressive talk programming sponsored by Rational Radio (via Nova M Radio) from 7PM-midnight, featuring Mike Malloy.

The BizRadio Network left KMNY (1360) for KJSA 1110 AM on May 23, 2008. Testing of the new 1110 frequency's signal began in April 2008. (In 2007, KJSA received a construction permit to move from 1120, to 1110 AM—with a considerable power increase to 20,000 watts.) From May 24 to June 30, 2008, KMNY aired "Retro Radio", a block format put together by "The Hi-Fi Club"'s Mike Shannon. Weekdays, oldies shows were hosted by Jim Thomas, Bud Buschardt, Randy Carlisle, Josh Holstead, John Lewis and Jay Weaver; "The Larry Stanley Show," an irreverent 'guy talk' show, aired Saturdays; and "The Hi-Fi Club" expanded to Sunday afternoons. Music during non-show times consisted of automated classic rock. Retro Radio aired a tribute to George Carlin upon his death in June 2008. KXOL-1360 veterans Bob Bruton and Jack Burns participated.

=== Rational Radio ===
Rational Radio group leased the entire 24-hour-a-day KMNY schedule from MRBI beginning July 1, 2008. It concluded on December 31, 2009. In addition to Mike Malloy, the new schedule featured Dial Global's Ed Schultz, Bill Press, and Thom Hartmann, and Air America's Lionel. KMNY's "The Hi-Fi Club" was on the station prior to the switch of the station from Biz Radio to Rational Radio and was carried over into the Rational Radio Format.

On April 1, 2009, Rational Radio added local hosts The Pugs and Kelly Show on weekday afternoons with Richard Hunter following. Weekend hosts included Cindy Sheehan of "Cindy Sheehan's Soapbox" and Jack E. Jett. The rest of the lineup was filled syndicated programming including Thom Hartmann and Air America Radio.

In December 2009, station president Dave Clifton announced that the station had been outbid for its lease renewal and would move much its locally originated programming to internet radio. While Rational Radio seeks a new broadcast home, they ended their run on KMNY on December 31, 2009.

=== Return to Business ===
On January 1, 2010, KMNY returned to a business talk radio format, airing the Biz Radio Network once again with a 24-hour lineup. In February 2010, the programming on KMNY 1360 switched to various ethnic and foreign language shows, including Spanish, Portuguese, and Greek.

On April 28, 2014, owner Multicultural announced the station was for sale, though as of 2022, there is still no buyer for KMNY. Multicultural began airing a Spanish-language Christian radio format sometime later.
