= WRR (FM) =

Radio station in Dallas

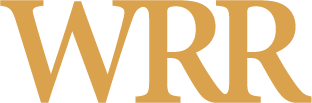

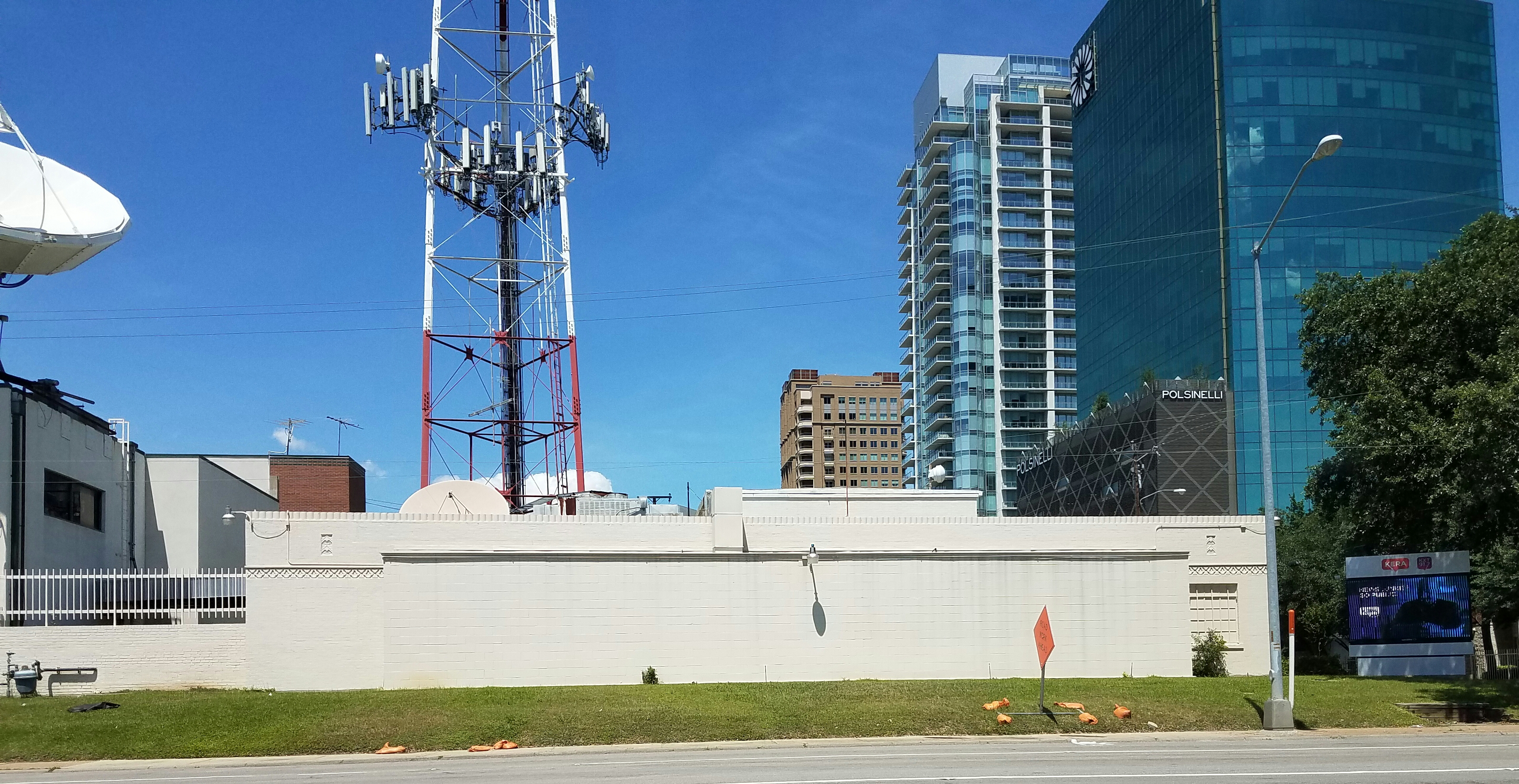
- Dallas, Texas; United States
- Broadcast area: Dallas–Fort Worth metroplex
- Frequency: 101.1 MHz (HD Radio)
- Branding: WRR

Programming
- Format: Classical music
- Affiliations: Classical 24

Ownership
- Owner: City of Dallas
- Operator: North Texas Public Broadcasting, Inc.
- Sister stations: KERA, KERA-TV, KKXT

History
- First air date: April 15, 1949; 77 years ago
- Former call signs: WRR-FM (1949–1978)
- Call sign meaning: Inherited from former 1310 AM sister station WRR

Technical information
- Licensing authority: FCC
- Facility ID: 11451
- Class: C
- ERP: 100,000 watts
- HAAT: 508 metres (1,667 ft)
- Transmitter coordinates: 32°35′19″N 96°58′05″W

Links
- Public license information: Public file; LMS
- Webcast: Listen live
- Website: www.wrr101.org

WRR (101.1 MHz) is a listener-supported, non-commercial FM radio station in Dallas, Texas, United States, which provides a full-time classical music radio format. While the station is municipally-owned by the City of Dallas, it is operated by North Texas Public Broadcasting, the owner of NPR member KERA (90.1 FM), adult album alternative station KKXT (91.7 FM), and PBS member KERA-TV (channel 13). WRR's studios are in the Fair Park complex in South Dallas.

WRR is a Class C station. It has an effective radiated power (ERP) of 100,000 watts, and transmits an HD Radio signal. The station's transmitter is located on West Belt Line Road in Cedar Hill.

Over the years, private broadcasters in the Dallas–Fort Worth radio market have made numerous but unsuccessful calls for privatizing the station. In January 2023, it transitioned from a commercial radio station to non-profit and listener-supported.

== History ==
=== Early years ===
WRR-FM began experimental broadcasts in 1948. Newspaper accounts pin WRR-FM's sign on date as April 15, 1949; it officially received its license to cover on October 14, 1949. It began as a sister station to WRR (now KTCK 1310 AM), which is the oldest station in Dallas, first licensed for municipal and police transmissions on August 5, 1921. It received an AM band broadcasting station license on March 13, 1922.

In its first few decades, WRR-FM would mostly simulcast its AM counterpart. The stations were network affiliates of the Mutual Broadcasting System and carried its schedule of comedies, dramas, news and sports during the "Golden Age of Radio". WRR-AM-FM later switched to the NBC Red Network.

=== Classical music ===
As network programming shifted to television, WRR-FM began airing classical music full time, while the AM station concentrated on news, talk and information. The City of Dallas sold WRR 1310 to Bonneville International in 1978, which switched the call sign to KAAM. Meanwhile, the Dallas government kept WRR-FM, which continued its classical format.

Also in the 1970s, the station increased its power to 100,000 watts, from its previous output of 68,000 watts.

=== Dallas City Council ===
As part of its municipal ownership, WRR began broadcasting Dallas City Council meetings in 1978. They usually took place every other Wednesday at 9 a.m. In later years, however, Portable People Meter (PPM) evidence showed that the meetings, which interrupted the classical format, caused a significant drop in the station's ratings. The station averages more than 11,000 listeners on weekdays, according to Nielsen Audio; that number dropped to 1,900 during council meetings. In 2018, station management was able to convince the city council to end the broadcasts. The meetings are still available on cable television in Dallas, as well as online.

In July 2021, the Dallas city government began seeking applications for a new management structure for WRR. Due to the COVID-19 pandemic, advertising revenue dropped; prior to the pandemic, however, the station had been losing money for eight years, per a press release issued by the City of Dallas Office of Arts and Culture. The statement said the city government believes steps are needed "to ensure it remains a City-owned classical music format radio station". In recent years, most classical music stations in large U.S. cities have switched from commercial operations to listener-supported models, including WQXR-FM in New York City, KDFC in San Francisco, WCRB in Boston and KING-FM in Seattle. WRR was one of the few classical stations to earn its revenue from advertisers. In June 2022, Dallas City Council voted to award management of the station to North Texas Public Broadcasting, which runs KERA (FM), changing the funding model from commercial to sponsorships while continuing to broadcast classical music. WRR dropped its remaining brokered programming on November 25, and transitioned to KERA management on January 3, 2023.

With these recent changes, the lineup is overhauled with the addition of the overnight program Music Through the Night via Classical 24, heard on many public stations.

=== Unusual callsign ===
While most radio stations in Texas have four-letter call signs beginning with a K, this station has three-letter callsign beginning with a W. Many stations going on the air in the early 1920s received three-letter call signs. The AM station with which WRR-FM had once been partnered dates back to 1921. WRR (AM) was the first licensed radio station west of the Mississippi and among the earliest in the country.

With the introduction of land-based U.S. radio station licensing in late 1912, it had been the practice to assign call signs starting with "K" in the west and "W" in the east. (Ship-based stations were just the opposite.) The original boundary line was located along the Texas-New Mexico border, and it wasn't until the shift in early 1923 to the Mississippi River that new stations going on the air in Texas received K instead of W call signs. However, existing stations were allowed to keep their non-conforming callsigns, which included such stations as WRR, WBAP in Fort Worth and WOAI in San Antonio. When WRR put the FM station on the air in 1949, the FCC allowed it to use the same call sign, plus the "-FM" suffix.

After the AM station was sold and its callsign changed to KAAM, WRR-FM dropped the no longer required "-FM" suffix from its call sign, effective May 15, 1978.

=== Notable personalities ===
The station was the starting point of John Peel's radio career. Peel, who later became a British disc jockey, notably covered the arraignment hearing of Lee Harvey Oswald shortly before Oswald was shot and killed.

=== Transmitting tower ===
The WRR (FM) lattice radio tower was located in the Fair Park complex. The tower was visible across Dallas and in the Fair Park vicinity. The FM antenna on top of the tower was removed in 2003. The tower was used as a cell tower for the last few years and was eventually dismantled in December 2015. The current transmitter is located at the Cedar Hill Antenna Farm in Cedar Hill.

== See also ==
- List of three-letter broadcast call signs in the United States
