= WKRA-FM =

WKRA-FM and WKRA

Holly Springs, Mississippi; United States
- Broadcast area: Memphis metropolitan area
- Frequencies: WKRA-FM: 92.7 MHz; WKRA: 1110 kHz
- Branding: The Change 92.7

Programming
- Format: Urban gospel

Ownership
- Owner: Billy R. Autry

History
- First air date: WKRA-FM: June 30, 1976; WKRA: September 1, 1966

Technical information
- Licensing authority: FCC
- Facility ID: WKRA-FM: 5334; WKRA: 5333
- Class: WKRA-FM: A; WKRA: D
- Power: WKRA: 1,000 watts (day)
- ERP: WKRA-FM: 3,000 watts
- HAAT: WKRA-FM: 91 meters (299 ft)
- Transmitter coordinates: WKRA-FM: 34°47′11″N 89°25′0″W

Links
- Public license information: WKRA-FM: Public file; LMS; WKRA: Public file; LMS
- Webcast: Listen live
- Website: thechange927.com

WKRA-FM (92.7 MHz) and WKRA (1110 kHz) are commercial radio stations licensed to Holly Springs, Mississippi and serving the Memphis metropolitan area. They are owned by Billy R. Autry, and they simulcast an urban gospel radio format with some Christian talk and teaching programs. The radio studios and offices are on Memphis Street in Holly Springs.

WKRA transmits with 1,000 watts non-directional, but because 1110 AM is a clear channel frequency reserved for Class A KFAB in Omaha, Nebraska and WBT in Charlotte, North Carolina, WKRA is a daytimer. It must sign off at night to avoid interference. WKRA-FM has an effective radiated power (ERP) of 3,000 watts and broadcasts around the clock.

== History ==
WKRA went on the air on September 1, 1966. WKRA-FM first signed on the air on June 30, 1976.
