= KHSE =

KHSE and KTCG

KHSE: Wylie, Texas; KTCG: Sanger, Texas; United States
- Broadcast area: Dallas–Fort Worth metroplex
- Frequencies: KHSE: 700 kHz; KTCG: 104.1 MHz (HD Radio)
- Branding: KHSE: Radio Caravan; KTCG: Radio Sangam

Programming
- Language(s): South Asian
- Format: Full Service
- Subchannels: KTCG-HD2: KZMP-FM simulcast KTCG-HD3: KHSE-AM simulcast

Ownership
- Owner: Texas FM Radio, LLC

History
- First air date: KHSE: 2003; KTCG: 2022
- Former call signs: KHSE: KXXT (2003–2004); KCAF (2004)

Technical information
- Licensing authority: FCC
- Facility ID: KHSE: 133464; KTCG: 762217
- Class: KHSE: B; KTCG: C3
- Power: KHSE: 1,500 watts (day); 920 watts (night)
- ERP: KTCG: 6,200 watts
- HAAT: KTCG: 181 meters (594 ft)
- Transmitter coordinates: KHSE: 33°02′1.4″N 96°17′55.9″W
- Translator(s): KHSE: see below
- Repeater(s): KHSE: 104.1 KTCG-HD3 (Sanger); KTCG: 1110 KVTT (Mineral Wells); KTCG: 104.9 KZMP-HD4 (Pilot Point)

Links
- Public license information: KHSE: Public file; LMS; KTCG: Public file; LMS
- Website: KHSE: jointhecaravan.com KTCG: telugusangam.net

KHSE (700 AM) is a commercial radio station licensed to Wylie, Texas. KTCG (104.1 FM) is a terrestrial radio station licensed to Sanger, Texas. Both facilities are under ownership of Texas FM Radio, LLC. and broadcast a full simulcast South Asian full-service radio format, including music and talk aimed at the Indian, Pakistani and Bangladeshi communities in the Dallas–Fort Worth metroplex.

== History ==
This station began as KXXT under an unknown format in 2003, then a year later it was changed to KCAF when a sister station on 990 AM became KMSR (now KFCD). On July 22, 2004, the call sign changed to KHSE and was to become a full-time business talk and sports format, but KHSE was long rumored to be in a "testing" phase to align the signal on their new tower. However, a new tower had never been constructed. KHSE went bankrupt in August 2005 and was auctioned off two months later (along with sister station KFCD) to a "debtor-in-possession". After two years of signal testing, KHSE has resumed its broadcasting activities as "Radio Caravan".

On February 27, 2007, an application was filed with the FCC to transfer the license from Bernard Dallas LLC to Principle Broadcasting Network - Dallas, LLC, which had entered into a transaction to acquire the two stations from the bankruptcy court. This transaction was never consummated.

Effective October 30, 2015, Bernard Dallas LLC sold KHSE and sister station KFCD to Mark Jorgenson's ACM Dallas V LLC for $475,000. Jorgenson then sold KHSE to John Hammond's Hammond Broadcasting, LLC effective November 20, 2015, for $1.5 million. Hammond Broadcasting in turn sold KHSE and translator K281CS to Texas FM Radio, LLC for $2 million effective October 22, 2018.

== Translator ==
Broadcast translator for KHSE
Call sign	Frequency	City of license	FID	ERP (W)	HAAT	Class	FCC info
K281CS	104.1 FM	McKinney, Texas	156828	250	110 m (361 ft)	D	LMS
