= KZMP-FM =

Radio station in Pilot Point, Texas

Coordinates: 33.5357°N 96.8319°W

- Pilot Point, Texas; United States
- Broadcast area: Dallas–Fort Worth metroplex–Sherman– Denison–Gainesville–Ardmore
- Frequency: 104.9 MHz (HD Radio)
- Branding: 104.9 FunAsia

Programming
- Language: South Asian
- Format: South Asian music
- Subchannels: HD2: “Radio Caravan” (KHSE simulcast); HD3: “Sadda Punjab Radio” (KVTT simulcast); HD4: “Radio Sangam” (KTCG simulcast)

Ownership
- Owner: Veena and Samuel Thakkar; (Perfect Media Group, LLC)
- Sister stations: KVTT

History
- First air date: 1983 (as KALK)
- Former call signs: KALK (1983–1984); KLAK (1984–1987); KMKT (1987–1990); KTCY (1996–2003)

Technical information
- Licensing authority: FCC
- Facility ID: 15854
- Class: C1
- ERP: 34,000 watts
- HAAT: 535 meters (1755 ft)
- Repeater: 104.1 KTCG-HD2 (Sanger)

Links
- Public license information: Public file; LMS
- Webcast: KZMP-FM Live Feed
- Website: funasia.net

KZMP-FM (104.9 MHz) is a commercial radio station licensed to Pilot Point, Texas, and serving the Dallas–Fort Worth metroplex. KZMP-FM is owned by Veena and Samuel Thakkar, through licensee Perfect Media Group, LLC. It airs a South Asian radio format, focusing on Bollywood music. The station broadcasts mainly in English, but also has programs in five South Asian languages – Hindi, Punjabi, Bengali, Gujarati and Persian.

KZMP-FM's studios and offices are located in Dallas, while the transmitter is located west of Collinsville in Cooke County.

== History ==
The station opened its studios in Denison, Texas, and began as KALK in 1983, but quickly changed the call sign to KLAK in 1984 as "K-Lake FM 105." It aired an adult contemporary format, and was nicknamed for its proximity to Lake Texoma in far North Texas. On May 12, 1987, KLAK moved to frequency 97.5 FM in Durant, Oklahoma, wiping out popular rimshot KWTX Waco's DFW signal at 97.5; but on that same day, KMKT was established on 104.9 FM as an oldies station and was branded "Katy Klassics" and later "Katy Oldies". Three years later, the station moved to 93.1 FM (now as "Katy Country") in Bells, leaving 104.9 FM dark for six years. KLAK, KMKT, and KWTX are still operational to this day, and although KWTX is still not available to Denison over the air, it is available over the Internet.

On August 10, 1996, KTCY-FM, operated by Tony Rodriguez, son of Spanish Radio pioneer Marcos Rodriguez Sr., began its broadcasting activities under the name "Fab 105", broadcasting all-Beatles music. It was the first Metroplex station to be fully programmed from computer hard drives, and in that case, the station ran jockless through 1997. Tony sold the station to his brother Marcos A. Rodriguez. After March 1997, KTCY switched to an all Gospel station as "Praise 104.9". A year after the swift change, their broadcasting license moved to Pilot Point to increase their signal. In 2000, it was rebranded "Joy 104.9" while maintaining its Gospel format but it soon changed to Regional Mexican as La Mejor 104.9

In 2002, Entravision Communications bought out KTCY and reimaged it to a Regional Mexican station as "Super Estrella 104.9". Less than two years later, KTCY (now on 101.7 FM) and KZMP have swapped call letters and branding, making this station KZMP "104.9 FM El Gato" while maintaining the same format. On January 6, 2005, KZMP was once again rebranded as "Radio Tricolor". Less than 2 years later, Entravision sold five of their Dallas/Fort Worth-area radio stations, including KZMP, to Liberman Broadcasting (now Estrella Media). Prior to the sale, the station switched to a short-lived Spanish Christian format as La Luz 104.9.

Effective July 27, 2021, Estrella Media sold KZMP-FM to Perfect Media Group, LLC.

== Signal ==
Unlike most of the area's FM stations, which transmit their signals from Cedar Hill, KZMP-FM transmits its signal from an unincorporated area west of Collinsville. Therefore, KZMP-FM's signal is much stronger in the extreme Northern parts of the Dallas/Fort Worth Metroplex as well as the cities of Decatur, Bowie, Gainesville, Sherman and Bonham, to as far north as Ardmore, Oklahoma, but is considerably weaker in Dallas, Fort Worth, and areas South of the cities themselves.
