= KERA-TV =

Television station in Dallas

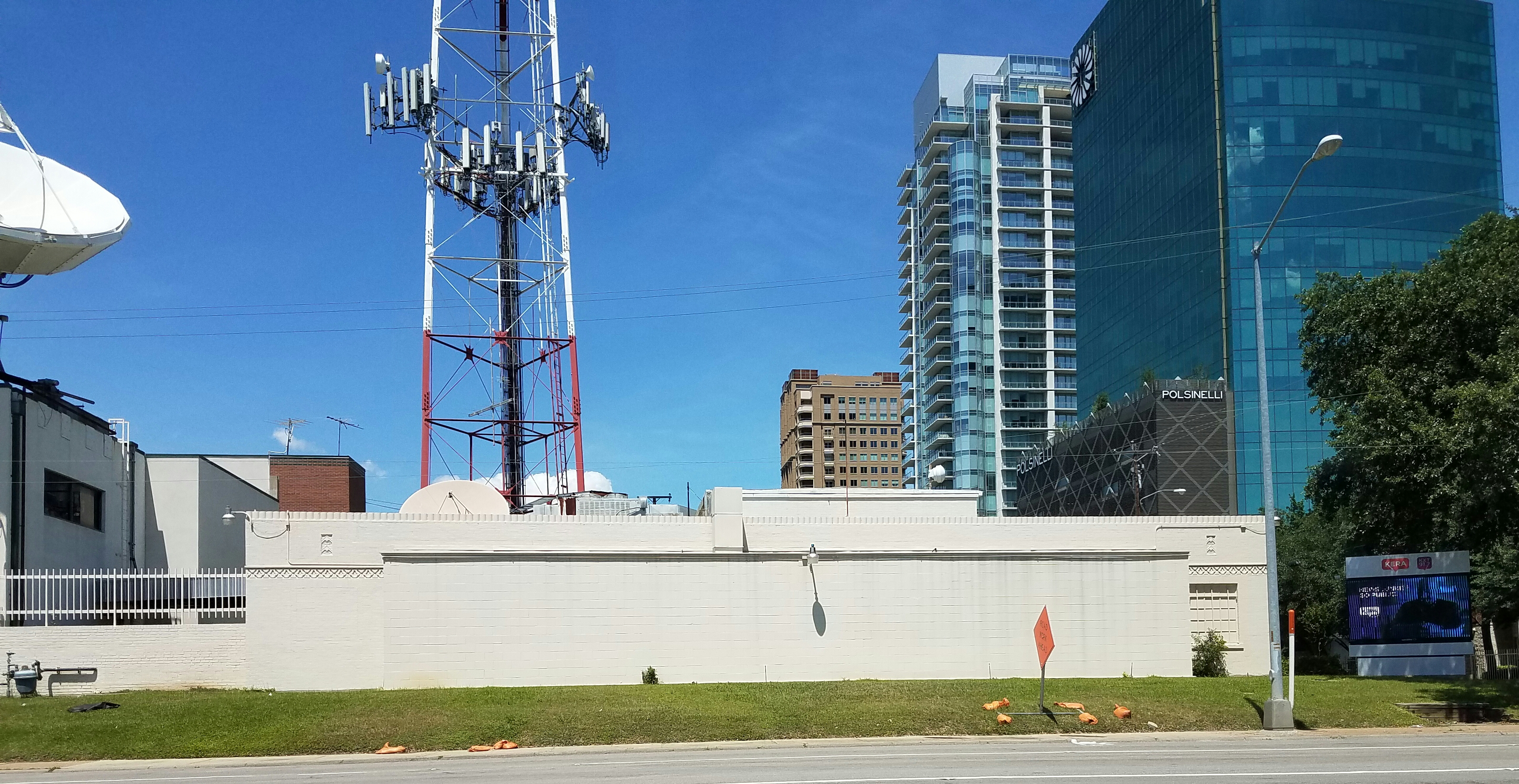
- Studios and offices of KERA-TV and co-owned radio stations KERA-FM and KKXT-FM
- Dallas–Fort Worth–Denton, Texas; United States
- City: Dallas, Texas
- Channels: Digital: 14 (UHF); Virtual: 13
- Branding: KERA

Programming
- Affiliations: 13.1: PBS; for others, see § Subchannels

Ownership
- Owner: North Texas Public Broadcasting, Inc.
- Sister stations: Radio: KERA, KKXT, WRR

History
- First air date: September 11, 1960
- Former channel number: Analog: 13 (VHF, 1960–2009)
- Former affiliations: NET (1960–1970)
- Call sign meaning: A new "ERA" in broadcasting

Technical information
- Licensing authority: FCC
- Facility ID: 49324
- ERP: 975 kW
- HAAT: 514.4 m (1,688 ft)
- Transmitter coordinates: 32°32′36″N 96°57′33″W
- Translator(s): K26NK-D Wichita Falls

Links
- Public license information: Public file; LMS
- Website: www.kera.org/tv/

KERA-TV (channel 13) is a PBS member television station licensed to Dallas, Texas, United States, serving the Dallas–Fort Worth metroplex. Owned by North Texas Public Broadcasting, Inc., it is sister to NPR member station KERA (90.1 FM), adult album alternative station KKXT (91.7 FM), and classical music station WRR (101.1 FM, which is operated under a management services agreement with the City of Dallas). The stations share studios on Harry Hines Boulevard; KERA-TV's transmitter is located in Cedar Hill, Texas.

== History ==
The VHF channel 13 allocation in the Dallas–Fort Worth market—which the Federal Communications Commission (FCC) reserved for non-commercial educational use in its list of frequencies assigned for broadcast television transmissions—was originally applied for use by Southern Methodist University in the late 1950s; however, the university had trouble raising enough funds for its planned educational station's start-up, programming and operational costs.

In 1958, the Dallas Independent School District (DISD) partnered with local nonprofit corporation Area Education Television Foundation, Inc. (which later evolved into North Texas Public Broadcasting) to apply for the allocation. In October of that year, W. T. White, then-superintendent of the DISD, announced that the station was slated to sign on the air by the beginning of the 1959–60 school year; programming on channel 13 was scheduled to include Spanish-language instructional programming for area elementary school students. The foundation had difficulty in meeting its fundraising goals to obtain start-up costs for the commencement of operations and broadcasts of its educational station; by May 1959, the foundation was said to be $265,000 short of its $890,000 target to cover the proposed station's first two years of broadcasting.

The original license application filed by the organization-school district partnership had obtained permission from the FCC to operate the station from broadcast facilities located in Fair Park (on land donated to the Area Educational Television Foundation and the DISD by the Dallas city government). However, in January 1960, the partnership applied for permission to broadcast from studios on Harry Hines Boulevard that were set to be vacated by WFAA-TV (channel 8), which had been used by that station since its sign-on (as KBTV) in September 1949. A. H. Belo Corporation was in the process of building new studio facilities at Young and Houston Streets to accommodate the operations of local newspaper The Dallas Morning News, WFAA-TV, WFAA (570 AM), and WFAA-FM 97.9. The Dallas Independent School District purchased the building on Harry Hines for $400,000.

Former KERA logo, used from 1985 to 2002.

KERA-TV (the call letters are said to represent a "new era in broadcasting") signed on the air on September 11, 1960, originally serving as a member station of National Educational Television (NET). It originally operated from temporary studio facilities at the Davis Building—located behind the original WFAA studios—in downtown Dallas, in two portable buildings that were made to resemble a schoolhouse. It also used the original transmission tower used by WFAA-TV from 1960 to 1971, before moving its transmitter to a tower in Cedar Hill owned by KTVT (channel 11) until 2009, when KTVT moved its transmitter to a different tower site a short distance away. However, KERA's transmitter only produced a medium-power signal that covered Dallas and surrounding suburbs in Dallas, Collin, Hunt, Rockwall, Ellis and Kaufman counties. The station would migrate its operations to the Harry Hines Boulevard facility in April 1961.

During its first years of operation, KERA benefitted frequently through help from commercial broadcast stations in the Metroplex. The Dallas Independent School District also paid the station to carry instructional telecourses that it would produce for broadcast on channel 13. The issues concerning channel 13's limited signal range would be resolved on August 31, 1970, when a new transmitter was installed that expanded KERA's signal coverage into Fort Worth and surrounding communities in Tarrant, Denton, Wise, Parker, Hood and Johnson counties. That same year, KERA became a member station of the Public Broadcasting Service (PBS), which was launched as an independent entity to supersede NET and took over many of the functions of its predecessor network.

In 1968, Robert A. "Bob" Wilson became managing director of KERA-TV. During his tenure, he hired Jim Lehrer, formerly of the Dallas Times Herald, to oversee the station's news and public affairs programming. In 1970, Wilson launched Newsroom, a nightly local news program anchored by Lehrer, who later became a nationally prominent PBS journalist. Wilson was the husband of photographer Laura Wilson and the father of actors Andrew, Owen and Luke Wilson.

In 1974, KERA gained a sister station on radio, when National Public Radio station KERA signed on the air on 90.1 FM; over time, KERA radio would expand its reach throughout North Texas through the launch of translators in Wichita Falls, Tyler and Sherman. That year, channel 13 became the first television station in the United States to broadcast episodes of Monty Python's Flying Circus; the station is often credited with introducing the British comedy series to American audiences, which eventually gave Flying Circus a cult following.

Former KERA logo, used from October 1, 2001, to January 24, 2016.

On September 1, 1988, North Texas Public Broadcasting signed on KDTN (channel 2) in Denton to serve as the market's secondary PBS member station, a project which the organization had been working on since May 1977, when it filed an FCC application for a construction permit to build an educational station on VHF channel 2 (North Texas Public Broadcasting would reach an agreement with its lone remaining competitor for the permit in 1984 to obtain the permit). The organization primarily used KDTN to run educational and instructional programs that had previously filled much of KERA's daytime schedule, along with carrying some programs produced by the University of North Texas (the KDTN studio facility was based on the university's campus). At that time, KERA shifted its schedule to offering primarily entertainment programming from PBS and other public television program distributors such as American Public Television; channel 13 also identified Denton as part of the station's service area in station identifications during the period it operated KDTN.

After making the decision to divest the secondary outlet on the basis that its funding was no longer sufficient to continue operating two television stations in the Metroplex, North Texas Public Broadcasting sold KDTN to religious broadcaster Daystar—which bought the station in a $20 million deal in order to get a better signal in the market to replace its original flagship, KMPX (channel 29), which it sold in turn—on August 12, 2003; the acquisition was finalized on January 13, 2004.

Through a special arrangement, KERA announced plans to continue carrying programming sourced from the station over KDTN's digital signal, in order to free up bandwidth on KERA's main digital signal to allow the station to begin transmitting high-definition content on digital channel 13.1. This has never been utilized as improvements in multiplexing technology have allowed a high-definition channel to exist with standard-definition channels, and KERA has had no need to use KDTN's bandwidth.

== Programming ==
As a PBS member station, much of KERA's programming consists of educational and entertainment programming distributed by PBS to its member stations, which include NOVA, the PBS NewsHour, Antiques Roadshow, Arthur, Frontline, Masterpiece, Daniel Tiger's Neighborhood, Nature and Sesame Street. While there is cross-promotion between KERA-TV and the KERA, KKXT and WRR radio stations, the radio properties conduct pledge drives independent of those conducted by channel 13.

KERA broadcasts children's programming from PBS Kids on its primary television channel, KERA-TV (13.1), and operates KERA Kids, a 24-hour children's programming service on digital subchannel 13.2. According to KERA's 2025 reporting, its educational programming on KERA-TV and KERA Kids reached more than 530,000 children weekly.

=== Original and PBS-distributed programs produced by KERA ===
KERA has long contributed original programming for distribution to the nationwide PBS system and individual member stations, including documentaries such as JFK: Breaking the News and Matisse and Picasso, the latter of which earned the station an Emmy Award nomination. The station also produced the PBS documentary series The U.S.–Mexican War, which aired between 1995 and 2006.

Other programs from KERA's production department that have been distributed to public television stations throughout Texas and nationwide have included The Texas Debates, CEO (a monthly interview series hosted by Lee Cullum, airing on KERA television and radio, which features interviews with chief executives from the corporate and non-profit sectors in North Texas that inquires about how companies try to attain or maintain success in the current global marketplace, as well as leadership style and ethics) and The Van Cliburn: 50 Years of Gold. It also produces Frame of Mind, a series co-produced by KERA's Art&Seek unit and the Video Association of Dallas, which showcases independent films, documentaries and video shorts from Texas-based filmmakers.

== News operation ==
KERA-TV became one of the earliest educational television stations in the U.S. to establish a news department on February 16, 1970, when it premiered Newsroom, a half-hour 6 p.m. newscast that aired Monday through Friday evenings, and was based on a similar program that aired on San Francisco PBS member station KQED. In October 1976, the program was relaunched as a half-hour prime time newscast under the title The 9 O'Clock Report, predating the move of then-independent station KTVT's late evening newscast to the 9 p.m. timeslot in August 1990. Within months of the change, channel 13 moved its evening newscast two hours earlier to 7 p.m. on January 31, 1977 (with the move, the program was briefly retitled as The 7 O'Clock Report, before becoming 13 Report the following month). KERA shut down its news department on September 21, 1977.

=== Notable former on-air staff ===
- Jerry Haynes – host of Peppermint Place (1975–1996); program was revamped version of former WFAA program Mr. Peppermint
- Jim Lehrer – anchor of Newsroom

== Technical information ==
=== Subchannels ===
The station's signal is multiplexed:

Subchannels of KERA-TV
Subchannel	Res.	Short name	Programming service	Programming description
13.1	1080i	KERA-HD	KERA HD	Main programming schedule in high definition; downconverted at the provider level for an equivalent standard definition channel.
13.2	480i	KIDS	KERA Kids	PBS Kids programming; formerly carried World from 2009 until the PBS Kids Channel launched on January 16, 2017.
13.3	480i	Create	KERA Create	Programming from the how-to and lifestyle network. Launched January 14, 2016.
13.4	480i	World	KERA World	Programming from World. Launched July 1, 2021.

=== Analog-to-digital conversion ===
KERA began broadcasting and transmitting a digital television signal on UHF channel 14 on December 14, 2000. The station shut down its analog signal, over VHF channel 13, on June 12, 2009, the official date on which full-power television stations in the United States transitioned from analog to digital broadcasts under federal mandate. The station's digital signal remained on its pre-transition UHF channel 14, using virtual channel 13.

=== Translators ===
==== Wichita Falls ====
- K26NK-D Wichita Falls

Prior to the sign-on of the station's Wichita Falls translator, KERA had maintained a unique arrangement to distribute its programming to northwest Texas and southwestern Oklahoma, which was one of the few areas of the United States that did not have a PBS member station of its own. Wichita Falls Educational Translator, Inc., a group headed by longtime State Representative Ray Farabee, launched KIDZ-TV on UHF channel 24 on November 13, 1973; the station maintained a full-power license, but operated at an effective radiated power of only 2.82 kilowatts, producing a signal that had limited coverage propagation from the transmitter equivalent to that of many low-power stations. Before the expansion of cable television into the area, the goals were simple; among them, to make the popular children's program Sesame Street available to viewers in Wichita Falls (at the time, it was standard for PBS to offer programs to commercial stations in areas that did not have public television service; but none of the three commercial stations in the Wichita Falls-Lawton market—NBC affiliate KFDX-TV (channel 3), CBS affiliate KAUZ-TV (channel 6) or ABC affiliate KSWO-TV (channel 7)—were interested). The local group had planned to apply for and build a translator to extend the KIDZ signal into the area. At the time, translators were only allowed to use signals picked up off the air, and KERA's signal was marginal at best in that part of North Texas.

KIDZ-TV shared tower space with KAUZ-TV, with the transmitter rebroadcasting KERA-TV's programming during the hours that KAUZ when was broadcasting, roughly between 6 a.m. and midnight. This meant that some specials that KERA aired on weekend evenings were interrupted before their conclusion when the KAUZ engineers (who tended channel 24 as a public service) switched off the transmitters for the night and went home.

By the late 1970s, the FCC updated its broadcast translator regulations to allow a microwave relay to be used to feed programming transmissions to the translator station. KERA was therefore able to build its own translator in Wichita Falls, also on channel 24, as K24AD. The translator provided a better signal quality and could operate throughout KERA's designated broadcast hours. The repeater moved to UHF channel 44 in 2005, at which point it changed its call sign to K44GS. In September 2009, the FCC granted a construction permit to North Texas Public Broadcasting to convert K44GS to digital transmissions; the permit remained valid until September 2012 (the current occupant of channel 24, K24HH-D, is unrelated to K24AD or the earlier KIDZ-TV). In summer of 2018, the callsign changed to K26NK-D.

On December 18, 2020, two transmission towers that housed the transmitter facilities of K26NK-D and Fox affiliate KJTL (channel 18) were vandalized when an unidentified suspect cut guy wires attached to both facilities; the tower belonging to K26NK-D as well as local NOAA Weather Radio station WXK31 later collapsed due to a lack of wire support to buffer it from winds gusting to 35 miles per hour (56 km/h) in the area. (The KJTL tower was able to remain standing in the strong winds, as the vandal had cut only two wires on that facility.) The translator remained off the air until May 6, 2021, when KERA restored service to K26NK-D on a separate tower north of Seymour Highway (near the Burlington Northern Santa Fe rail line) in southwestern Wichita Falls.

==== Tyler ====
In October 2009, North Texas Public Broadcasting filed an application with the FCC for a license to operate a KERA translator in Tyler. The license application requested for the translator to operate on UHF channel 25. The application was dismissed in March 2011. Two additional applications are still pending for repeaters on UHF channels 35 and 44, but no apparent actions have been taken on these applications to date.

== Out-of-market coverage ==
KERA-TV serves as the default PBS member station for several markets in North and West Texas that do not have a locally based PBS member station, including Abilene, San Angelo and the Tyler–Longview–Lufkin–Nacogdoches DMA, as well as the Texas side of the Sherman–Ada market. KERA is also available on cable in Hillsboro, Waco and Texarkana.

== Digital platforms ==
=== KERA Passport ===
KERA offers PBS Passport as a membership benefit, providing eligible donors with extended on-demand access to PBS programming.

=== Tellyspotting ===
Tellyspotting is a blog operated by KERA that provides news about British television series (many of which – specifically those aired as part of the PBS wheel series Masterpiece, such as Victoria and Sherlock – are carried by KERA-TV, or its traditional block of Britcoms), detailing new and upcoming programs, and news and articles about British-originated programs aggregated from around the Internet.

== Other services ==
=== Education and community engagement ===
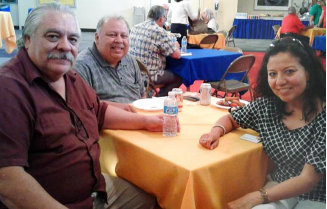
Guests attend a KERA screening of Willie Velásquez: Your Vote is Your Voice.

KERA maintains several digital resources available for use by local schools and organizations serving children and families across North Texas. "Ready for Life" is a multimedia initiative that provides resources for parents, teachers and caregivers to prepare school-age children to live healthy and socially enriched lives, offering training modules on temperament, attachment and socialization, early literacy and nutrition and fitness; a 60-minute documentary; books; and Spanish-language materials.

The "Summer Learning Challenge" is an annual initiative targeted at families and organized with participating North Texas nonprofits. Participants are required to complete a series of online PBS-related activities and challenges, while families are encouraged to read books, prepare recipes and take part in KERA-recommended summer activities together.

In March–April 2016, KERA held the Dallas-Fort Worth iteration of the Cyberchase Step It Up! program, in partnership with the Boys & Girls Club of Greater Fort Worth and the Blue Zones Project, which was designed to inspire kids and educators to find opportunities to work more steps in their regular day while learning about math. In June 2016, KERA hosted and sponsored an event at the Trinity River Audubon Center (TRAC) for 120 children from lower-income and immigrant families, in which participants engaged in educational activities centered around the Trinity River.

KERA also hosts various screenings related to television programs and focused on community engagement. In the fall of 2016, KERA hosted two screenings of the documentary Willie Velásquez: Your Vote is Your Voice. In March 2016, KERA partnered with the Texas Rangers Baseball Foundation to present two screenings of the Ken Burns documentary Jackie Robinson, which chronicled the life and contributions of the first African American to play in Major League Baseball. In April 2017, KERA hosted a screening for Burns' multi-part documentary film, The Vietnam War.

== See also ==
- KERA (FM) – co-owned news/talk radio station
- KKXT – co-owned AAA radio station
- WRR (FM) – co-managed classical music radio station
- KDTN – former sister television station based in Denton, now a Daystar owned-and-operated station
