= KTTP =

- Pineville, Louisiana; United States
- Broadcast area: Alexandria area
- Frequency: 1110 kHz

Programming
- Format: Gospel

Ownership
- Owner: Martin Johnson and Anthony Brown; (Radio Two, LLC)

History
- First air date: 1974
- Former call signs: KPAL (1974–1985); KKLC (1985–1991); KTLD (1991–2000)

Technical information
- Licensing authority: FCC
- Facility ID: 27225
- Class: D
- Power: 2,000 watts day
- Transmitter coordinates: 31°21′52.00″N 92°27′15.00″W

Links
- Public license information: Public file; LMS
- Website: thenewkttp.com

KTTP (1110 AM) is a radio station broadcasting a gospel format. Licensed to Pineville, Louisiana, United States, the station serves the Alexandria area. The station is currently owned by Martin Johnson and Anthony Brown, through licensee Radio Two, LLC. Much of the programming featured is from the Rejoice! Musical Soul Food satellite feed.

Because it shares the same frequency as "clear channel" stations KFAB in Omaha, Nebraska and WBT in Charlotte, North Carolina, KTTP only operates during the daytime hours.

== History ==
The station was assigned the call letters KKLC on October 22, 1985. On August 27, 1991, the station changed its call sign to KTLD; then on September 13, 2000, to the current callsign.
