= WUAT =

- Pikeville, Tennessee; United States
- Broadcast area: Pikeville, Tennessee; Bledsoe County, Tennessee
- Frequency: 1110 kHz
- Branding: 1110 WUAT

Programming
- Format: Variety

Ownership
- Owner: Vicki R. Smith and Johnny William Paul Bridges; (WUAT, LLC)

History
- First air date: December 19, 1972

Technical information
- Licensing authority: FCC
- Facility ID: 10397
- Class: D
- Power: 250 watts (days only)
- Transmitter coordinates: 35°36′18.0″N 85°11′14.0″W

Links
- Public license information: Public file; LMS

WUAT is a Variety formatted broadcast radio station licensed to Pikeville, Tennessee, serving Pikeville and Bledsoe County, Tennessee. WUAT is owned and operated by Vicki R. Smith and Johnny William Paul Bridges, through licensee WUAT, LLC.

== History ==
In 1995, Dr. Charles Bownds and his wife Joyce, originally from Houston, Texas, purchased WUAT.

The station's studios are within the Mini-Outlet store, also owned by the Bownds, along Main Street in Pikeville. Joyce Bownds, who was also the station's morning disc jockey, died on January 31, 2016. On March 18, 2016, ownership of the station was transferred to the Estate of Joyce Virginia Bownds, with her husband Dr. Charles P. Bownds as the executor.

The Estate of Joyce Virginia Bownds entered into an agreement with Vicki R. Smith and Johhny William Paul Bridges, both of Pikeville, on August 24, 2016. The sale to Smith and Bridges' WUAT, LLC, at a price of $20,000, was consummated on October 17, 2016.
