= Airplay40 =

Syndicated radio chart show

Airplay 40
- Genre: Contemporary hit radio
- Produced by: Fourway Media
- Original release: 2008-06-01
- Website: airplay40.com

Airplay40 is a syndicated radio-based Top 40 chart show broadcast around the globe on English speaking radio stations. It is based on the UK Singles Chart format, and is derived from airplay from subscriber English-language radio stations across Europe and the Middle East. The programme is aimed at English expatriates and tourists visiting popular holiday destinations across Europe and the Middle East.

The programme is broadcast to over ten regions including Spain, Greece, Cyprus, Italy, Gibraltar, Oman, Dubai, Malta, Aruba and New Zealand, and appears on selected internet radio stations.

The programme is hosted by Spencer James, and is produced by Fourway Media.

Airplay 40 is broadcast every Sunday, with the website updated as the programme airs. The website also has the showbiz news headlines, forums for discussion of the songs in the chart, and about life in the expat community.

Also there is a weekly showbiz news bulletin, with the main news in the world of entertainment, and a look back at previous hits over the years on the chart in the "Rewind" section of the programme.

== History ==
The programme was originally called The eXpat Chart, and was specifically targeted towards an English speaking audience on radio stations broadcasting outside of the UK. The programme was launched in June 2008 and grew rapidly, however an increase in UK based stations and a shift in marketing plans meant a re-brand was needed.

In 2010, eXpat Party was launched, hosted at first by presenter Danny Looker, and then in 2011 by comedy duo Mabbs and Justice. This was broadcast until the spring of 2012, when eXpat Chart Rewind was launched.

In January 2013, The eXpat Chart was rebranded as Airplay40, with a new website.

== Broadcast stations ==
The eXpat Chart is broadcast to over 40 radio stations across the globe. All times are local to the location of broadcast.

The stations include:

- Radio Napa in Cyprus – 106.3fm and online – Sundays from 4pm.
- Ace FM in Alhaurin & Coin in mainland Spain – 106.8fm and online – Sundays from 5pm.
- Bay Radio in the Costa Blanca – 88.4, 88.8, 89.2, 89.4 & 98.5fm and online – Sundays from 6pm.
- Coast FM in Tenerife – 89.2 & 100.8fm and online – Sundays from 4pm.
- UK Away FM in Lanzarote – 99.4 & 99.9fm and online – Saturdays from 5pm.
- Central FM in Spain – 105.5 & 92.6fm and online – Sundays from 4pm.
- Radio Effedue in Italy – On fm and online – Sundays from 4pm.
- HiFM in Oman – 95.9fm and online – Thursday's & Fridays from 4pm.
- Sea FM Radio in Finland, 88,8 MHz and online – Sundays from 6pm.
- 88.6 Island FM in Zante – 88.6fm and online – Sundays from 8pm.
- Energy FM in Malta – 96.4fm and online – Thursdays from 6pm.
- www.myexpatradio.com in Dubai – Online – Sundays from 7pm.
- Paul FM Radio – Global – Online – Every Sunday from 8:00am.
- Miskin Radio – North West Kent and global – Online – Every Friday from 4pm.

A full listing of stations that broadcast the programme is available on the programme website.

== Spin-off programmes ==
In December 2008 and December 2009, Fourway Radio, the producers of The eXpat Chart, presented a Christmas Special called The eXmas Chart. This was hosted by Spencer James, and co-hosted by Martin Jefferies who is the Showbiz news editor for the programme, and Adam Williams, who is one of the journalists in the showbiz newsroom. it has been announced that the programme will return for another broadcast in 2010, with a slight change to the format of the programme.

Following the death of Michael Jackson in June 2009, There was a special commemorating Jackson's musical history, playing the top 40 songs of his career.
