= KAAI =

Air 1 radio station in Palisade–Grand Junction, Colorado

- Palisade, Colorado; United States
- Broadcast area: Grand Junction, Colorado
- Frequency: 98.5 MHz

Programming
- Format: Christian Worship
- Network: Air 1
- Affiliations: Air1

Ownership
- Owner: Educational Media Foundation

History
- First air date: 2007
- Former call signs: KAAI (7/2006-10/2009); KVTT (10/2009); KJSA (10/2009-4/2010)
- Call sign meaning: Air 1

Technical information
- Licensing authority: FCC
- Facility ID: 164273
- Class: C3
- ERP: 260 watts
- HAAT: 911 meters
- Transmitter coordinates: 39°3′14″N 108°15′13″W

Links
- Public license information: Public file; LMS
- Webcast: Listen Live
- Website: air1.com

KAAI (98.5 FM, "Air 1") is an American radio station licensed to serve the community of Palisade, Colorado. The station broadcasts a Christian Worship format to the Grand Junction, Colorado, area. KAAI is owned and operated by the Educational Media Foundation.

== History ==
This station launched in 2007 as KAAI, a stand-alone translator of Air 1--originally a Christian rock radio network. In March 2008, the station was bought by Covenant Educational Media, Inc. and its Contemporary Christian/Religious format was launched.

KVTT/KJSA logo (2009)

In October 2009, the station changed its call sign to KVTT on the 1st then to KJSA on the 14th. The changes were made after its sister station in Dallas, Texas, which formerly held the KVTT calls, vacated its FM frequency following a sale to a public broadcaster, which now operates that station as adult album alternative-formatted KKXT. The KVTT call sign now resides on a daytime-only AM station in Mineral Wells, Texas, formerly licensed as KJSA, which was operated by Covenant Educational Media from October 2009 until July 2010, when Covenant ceased operations; that station is now broadcasting a full service Asian format programmed by that station's current owners, Texoma Broadcasting.

The station fell silent on October 13, 2009, making it one of the shortest-running Christian music/talk formatted stations in the nation. On October 29, the station applied to the FCC for special temporary authority to remain silent for financial reasons while a suitable buyer for the station and its assets was found. Its sister station KVTT suffered the same fate on July 12, 2010, with control of that station returned to its owners, who brokered its broadcast day to Covenant. The Commission granted the station this authority on February 16, 2010, with a scheduled expiration date of August 15, 2010.

Covenant reached an agreement to sell KJSA back to the Educational Media Foundation for a cash price of $200,000 on February 4, 2010. The FCC approved the sale on March 26, 2010, and the transaction was consummated on April 8, 2010. On April 14, 2010, KJSA changed their call letters back to KAAI and returned to the air as a member of the Air 1 radio network.
