= WYMW =

- Hurricane, West Virginia; United States
- Broadcast area: Hurricane, West Virginia; Putnam County, West Virginia
- Frequency: 1110 kHz
- Branding: Walk FM

Programming
- Format: Christian Adult Contemporary

Ownership
- Owner: Positive Alternative Radio, Inc.

History
- First air date: 1966
- Former call signs: WPNS (1966–1975); WZTQ (1975–1984); WVKV (1984–1996); WOKU (1996–2009); WIHY (2009–2012); WMUX (2012–2018)
- Former frequencies: 1080 kHz (1966–1971)

Technical information
- Licensing authority: FCC
- Facility ID: 42653
- Class: D
- Power: 1,000 watts (daytime only)
- Transmitter coordinates: 38°26′41.0″N 82°0′54.0″W
- Translators: W257EK (99.3 MHz, Charleston)

Links
- Public license information: Public file; LMS

WYMW is a radio station licensed to Hurricane, West Virginia, serving Hurricane and Putnam County, West Virginia. WYMW is owned and operated by Positive Alternative Radio, Inc.

== History ==
Until April 5, 2012, WYMW was owned by Baker Family Stations and carried an Oldies/Classic rock format.
