= KERA (FM) =

Radio station in Dallas

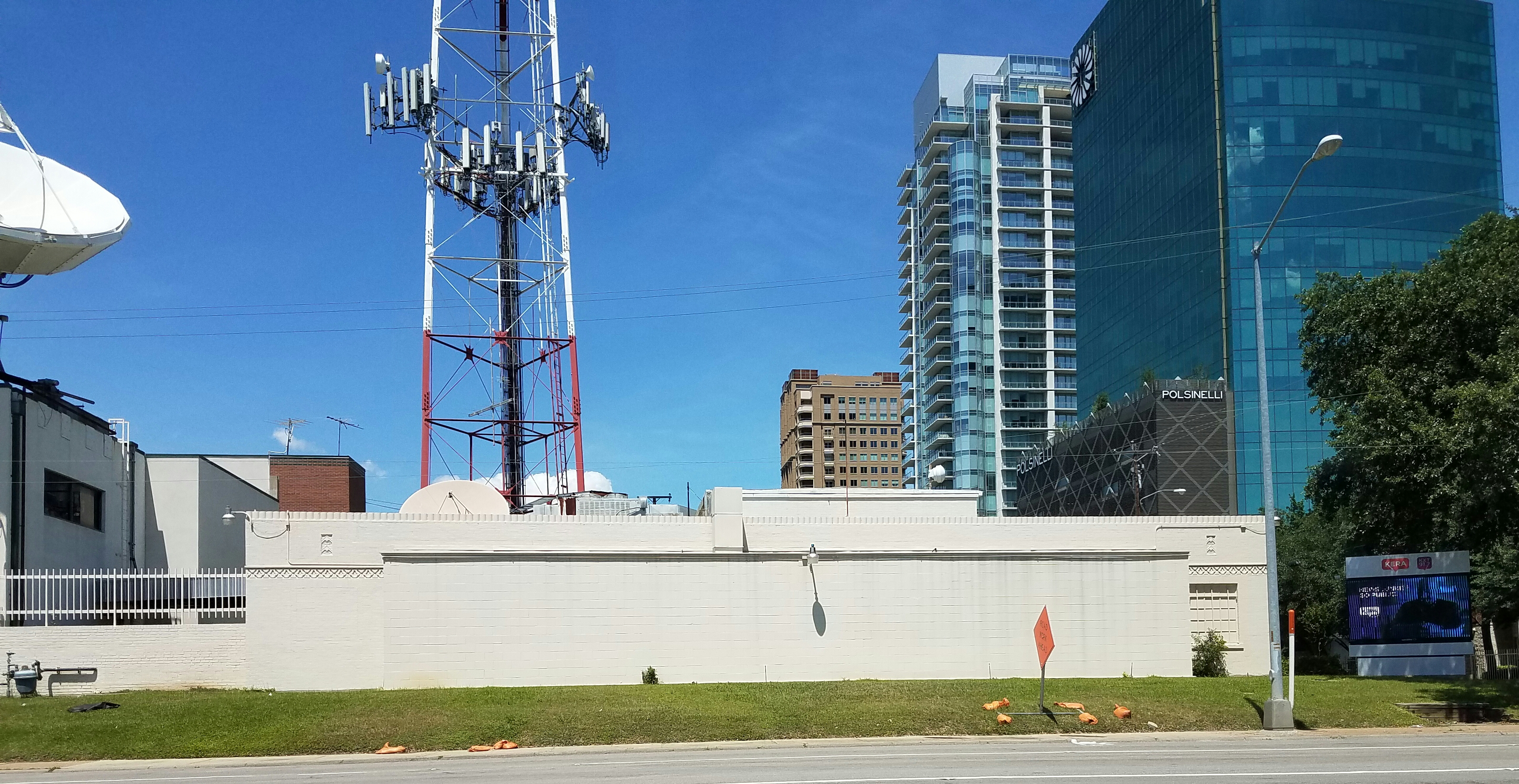
- KERA-FM's studios, north of downtown Dallas
- Dallas, Texas; United States
- Broadcast area: Dallas–Fort Worth metroplex
- Frequency: 90.1 MHz
- RDS: KERA News, NPR in North Texas
- Branding: 90.1 KERA News

Programming
- Format: News/talk; public radio
- Affiliations: American Public Media; BBC World Service; National Public Radio; Public Radio Exchange

Ownership
- Owner: North Texas Public Broadcasting
- Sister stations: KERA-TV; KKXT; WRR

History
- First air date: July 11, 1974
- Former call signs: KZAG (1973–1974, CP)
- Call sign meaning: A new "era" in broadcasting

Technical information
- Licensing authority: FCC
- Facility ID: 49323
- Class: C0
- ERP: 30,000 watts
- HAAT: 572 meters (1,877 ft)
- Transmitter coordinates: 32°35′2.5″N 96°57′49″W
- Translator: See § Translators

Links
- Public license information: Public file; LMS
- Webcast: Listen live
- Website: kera.org/radio

KERA (90.1 MHz) is a non-commercial radio station licensed to Dallas, Texas, serving the Dallas–Fort Worth metroplex. It is owned by North Texas Public Broadcasting, and a member station of National Public Radio (NPR). KERA's studios are located on Harry Hines Boulevard in Dallas.

KERA is a Class C0 station, with an effective radiated power (ERP) of 30,000 watts. The station's transmitter is on Plateau Drive in Cedar Hill. KERA is also heard on three FM translators serving Tyler (100.1 FM), Wichita Falls (88.3 FM) and the Sherman–Denison area (99.3 FM).

== History ==
In 1960, public television station KERA-TV was launched. Channel 13 had already been set aside by the Federal Communications Commission (FCC) for non-commercial broadcasting in Dallas. The call sign is said to represent a "new era in broadcasting". The Dallas Independent School District joined with the Area Educational Television Foundation to start the TV station. This group evolved into North Texas Public Broadcasting.

In the early 1970s, the organization applied for a construction permit to start a non-commercial FM station. It was given a call sign of KZAG but it took the television station's call letters by the time it debuted. KERA signed on the air on July 11, 1974. In its early years, it played classical music with news and discussion shows. It became a member station of NPR and began adding the network's programs to its schedule. The station later expanded its reach into other North Texas communities using rebroadcasters: Wichita Falls (88.3), Tyler (100.1), and Sherman (99.3).

In the late 1990s and 2000s, KERA gradually scaled back its music programs. It then switched to an all-news and information format full-time in 2009 with any remaining music programming moved to sister adult album alternative station KKXT (91.7 FM). In 2014, KERA expanded its news department, leading to increased local reporting. Since this expansion, hundreds of KERA stories have been broadcast nationally and internationally by NPR, PRI and the BBC.

KERA Radio's previous logo used from 2000 until January 2016.

Prior to the launch of KKXT, KERA aired a locally produced Sunday evening music program, 90.1 at Night, hosted by Paul Slavens. The program was moved to KKXT and was renamed The Paul Slavens Show. KERA was rebroadcast on the public, educational, and government access (PEG) cable TV channel, Irving Community Television Network during its off-air times prior to 2009.

From 2012 until April 2018, KERA enjoyed a news partnership with NBC-owned television station KXAS Channel 5 in Fort Worth. This was a part of a larger partnership effort between all NBC owned-and-operated stations and nonprofit news organizations in their communities, a byproduct of the Comcast-NBCUniversal merger which took place in 2011. The content has since then moved to Audacy-owned news station KRLD.

North Texas Public Broadcasting is a non-profit corporation registered in the state of Texas. While there is cross-promotion between the group's stations, KERA, KKXT, WRR and KERA-TV operate their own pledge drives.

== Programming ==
KERA has a news and information format that includes reports from the KERA newsroom and the weekday hour-long program Think. KERA also carries Texas Standard, a weekday program from the state capital in Austin. The rest of the weekday schedule comes from NPR and other public radio networks; BBC World Service programming airs in the overnight.

KERA's on-air staff includes Morning Edition host Sam Baker, All Things Considered host Justin Martin, and reporters Stella Chavez, Christopher Connelly, Lauren Silverman, Jerome Weeks and Bill Zeeble. KERA News Digital Storytelling projects provide an in-depth look at the people of Texas – the crises they endure, the issues they overcome and the triumphs they achieve.

=== Think ===
The KERA production Think, hosted by Krys Boyd, features guests, authors and political leaders who discuss topics in the news. Call-in comments and texted questions are also encouraged. The show's host and crew have traveled to Washington, D.C., yearly since 2015 to broadcast live from NPR headquarters. Notable guests during Think in D.C. have included professor Michael Eric Dyson and U.S. Senators Ted Cruz and John Cornyn.

Think is syndicated to other public radio stations in Texas, Alabama, Alaska, California, Colorado, Florida, Georgia, Illinois, Indiana, Kentucky, Louisiana, Michigan, Mississippi, Missouri, North Carolina, Oregon, Pennsylvania, Rhode Island, South Carolina, Virginia, and Washington State.

== Translators ==
Broadcast translators for KERA
Call sign	Frequency	City of license	FID	ERP (W)	HAAT	Class	FCC info	Notes
K261CW	100.1 FM	Tyler, Texas	26620	250	96.1 m (315 ft)	D	LMS	First air date: April 19, 1993
K202DR	88.3 FM	Wichita Falls, Texas	49329	250	84.4 m (277 ft)	D	LMS	First air date: January 16, 1998
K257EV	99.3 FM	Sherman, Texas	144426	170	94.2 m (309 ft)	D	LMS	First air date: June 26, 2007

== See also ==
- KKXT (AAA radio station)
- KERA-TV
- WRR (FM)
