= Biz Radio Network =

Radio network in Texas, United States

- Type: Radio network
- Country: United States
- Availability: In Texas through its Radio affiliates
- Owner: Biz Radio Networks
- Launch date: 2005
- Dissolved: 2012
- Official website: [bizradio.com (defunct)]

The Biz Radio Network was a Texas-based radio network that owns three AM radio stations.

== SEC settlement ==
In November 2009, the Securities and Exchange Commission (SEC) alleged that Albert Kaleta and his firm Kaleta Capital Management sold $10 Million promissory notes to investors, the proceeds of which were to be lent to small businesses at 12 to 14 percent interest. Instead, the SEC alleged, the money was used to prop up the ailing Biz Radio Network and a related investment advisory firm, Daniel Frishberg Financial Services (DFFS).

As a result of these regulatory issues, Kaleta's interest was bought back by the company. Kaleta is also alleged to have used investors' money to pay $1.6 million in personal expenses, including $10,000/monthly credit card bills and a Mercedes. Kaleta denied the allegations of improper use of the money. These allegations were never proven and were not part of Kaleta's settlement with the SEC. Kaleta signed a consent order neither admitting nor denying wrongdoing, and while the radio network and DFFS were not accused of wrongdoing by the SEC, both the radio network and Frishberg's investment firm will need to repay the investors, as do all other borrowers.

== Affiliates before closure ==
- KTEK, 1110 AM, Houston (2.5 kW)
- KTMR, 1130 AM, Edna (Victoria) (10 kW)
