= 2008 NFL season =

American football season

Regular season
- Duration: September 4 – December 28, 2008

Playoffs
- Start date: January 3, 2009
- AFC Champions: Pittsburgh Steelers
- NFC Champions: Arizona Cardinals

Super Bowl XLIII
- Date: February 1, 2009
- Site: Raymond James Stadium, Tampa, Florida
- Champions: Pittsburgh Steelers

Pro Bowl
- Date: February 8, 2009
- Site: Aloha Stadium

AFC teams: West, North, South, East
NFC teams: West, North, South, East

The 2008 NFL season was the 89th regular season of the National Football League (NFL), themed with the slogan "Believe in Now."

Super Bowl XLIII, the league's championship game, was at Raymond James Stadium in Tampa, Florida, on February 1, 2009, with the Pittsburgh Steelers coming out victorious over the Arizona Cardinals 27–23 and winning their NFL-record sixth Vince Lombardi Trophy.

Conversely, the Detroit Lions became the first NFL team with a winless season since the strike-shortened 1982 NFL season, finishing their season 0–16. Their 0-16 record would eventually be matched by the 2017 Cleveland Browns. For the first time since the NFL expanded to the sixteen-game season in 1978, three teams won two or fewer games: the Lions, the Kansas City Chiefs, and the St. Louis Rams. Previously two teams won two or fewer games in 1979, 1981, 1983, 1985, 1992, and 2001. Also, for the first time since the 1985 Denver Broncos, a team finishing with an 11–5 record missed the playoffs — the defending AFC champion New England Patriots.

The regular season began on September 4 with the defending Super Bowl XLII champion New York Giants defeating the Washington Redskins.

This was the last NFL season to air on analog television, as the Digital television transition in the United States, which required all full-power stations to convert to digital, began on June 12, 2009.

== Draft ==
The 2008 NFL draft was held from April 26 to 27, 2008 at New York City's Radio City Music Hall. With the first pick, the Miami Dolphins selected offensive tackle Jake Long from the University of Michigan.

== New referees ==
Gerald Austin and Larry Nemmers retired. Carl Cheffers and Alberto Riveron were promoted to referee. Ron Blum also retired from line judge position.

== Notable retirements ==
- Larry Allen
- Michael Strahan
- Steve McNair
- Jonathan Ogden
- John Lynch
- Warren Sapp
- Morten Anderson
- Troy Brown
- Marcus Robinson
- Dan Morgan
- Rod Smith
- Ted Washington

== Rule changes ==
The following rule changes were passed at the league's annual owners' meeting in Palm Beach, Florida, during the week of March 31:

- One defensive player will be allowed to wear a radio similar to the one worn by the quarterback to communicate with the coaching staff on the field.
- The "force-out" rule on catches made near the sidelines has been eliminated. A receiver now must come down with the ball and both feet in bounds for a pass to be ruled complete; previously, passes would be ruled complete if the receiver was pushed by a defender while in the air and the official judged that he would have come down in bounds had he not been pushed. However, if a receiver is wrapped up in mid-air by a defender and carried out of bounds before both feet touch the ground, the official can still rule the play a completion.
- The 5-yard incidental grabbing of the face mask penalty has been eliminated; incidental contact will not result in a penalty, though intentional grabbing of the face mask will remain a 15-yard personal foul.
- Teams that win the opening coin toss now have the option to defer the decision until the start of the second half, the same as in college and Canadian football.
- Field goal attempts that bounce off the goal post are now reviewable under instant replay.
- Legal forward hand offs that touch the ground and attempted snaps when the ball hits the ground before the quarterback touches it are now considered fumbles; previously, forward hand offs were treated as incomplete passes, while a snap that hit the ground before the quarterback touched it was a 5-yard illegal procedure penalty.

== Preseason ==
In preseason games, the annual Pro Football Hall of Fame Game was played August 3 between the Indianapolis Colts and Washington Redskins, which aired on NBC. Washington won the game, 30–16. Other preseason highlights included the first game of the Toronto Series, which was played August 14 between the Buffalo Bills and the Pittsburgh Steelers at Toronto's Rogers Centre. The Bills won that game, 24–21.

== Regular season ==
=== Formula ===
Based on the NFL's scheduling formula, the intraconference and interconference matchups for 2008 were:

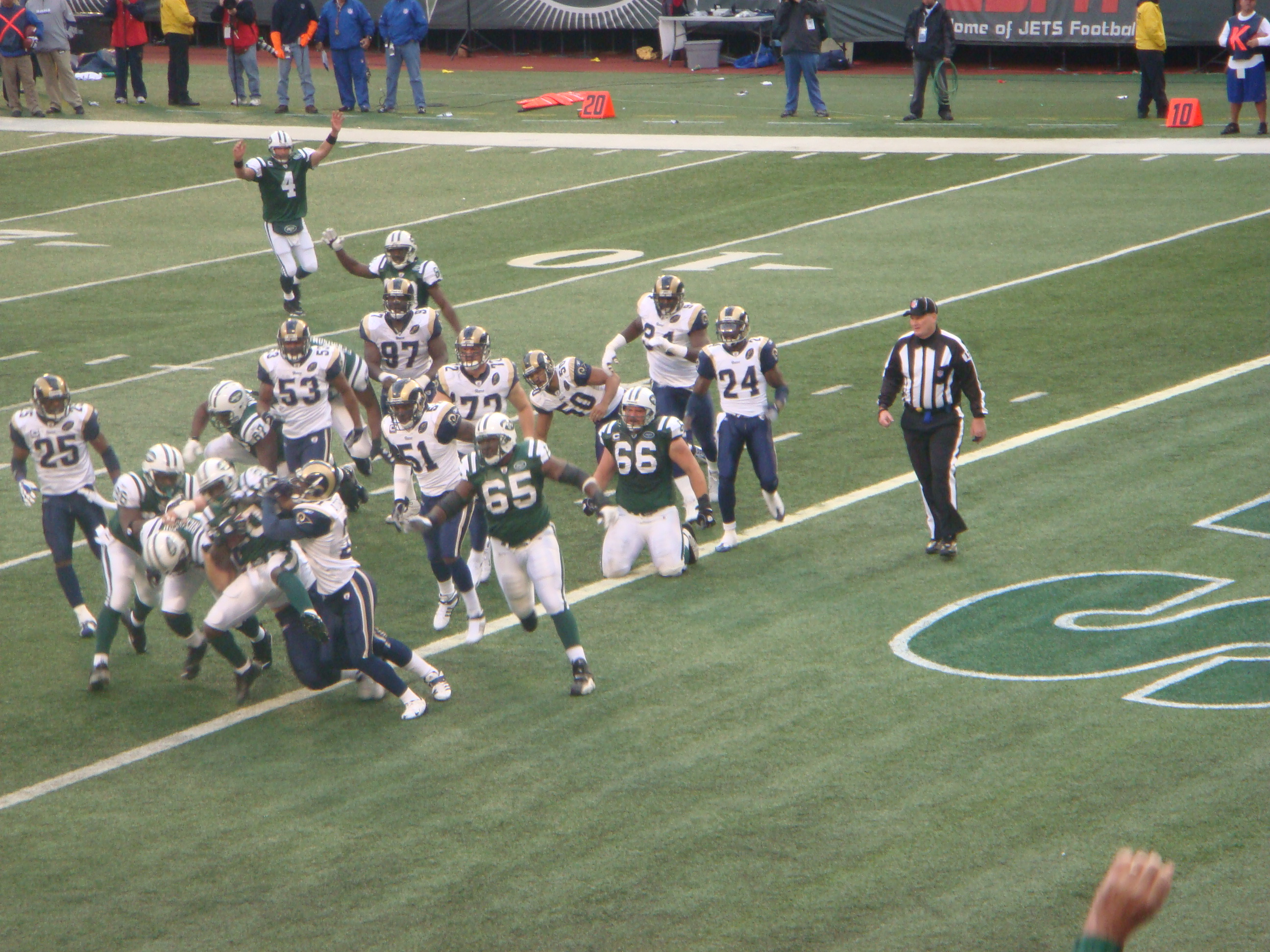
Thomas Jones scores a touchdown for the New York Jets against the St. Louis Rams in week 10 of the season

Division	AFC opponent	NFC opponent
AFC East	West	West
AFC North	South	East
AFC South	North	North
AFC West	East	South
NFC East	West	North
NFC North	South	South
NFC South	North	West
NFC West	East	East

=== Opening weekend ===
The annual NFL Kickoff Game to start the season took place on September 4 and featured the Super Bowl XLII champion New York Giants winning over their division rivals, the Washington Redskins, at Giants Stadium by a score of 16–7. The game's kickoff was ninety minutes earlier than previous years, at 7 p.m. EDT, because of a time conflict with the 2008 Republican National Convention.

Other featured games during the opening week included the NBC Sunday Night Football game between the Chicago Bears and the Indianapolis Colts (the first regular season game at Lucas Oil Stadium and a rematch of Super Bowl XLI), in which the Kyle Orton-led Bears upset the Colts 29–13. In addition, there were two Monday Night Football contests, both division rivalries, as part of the now annual doubleheader: The Minnesota Vikings at the Green Bay Packers (the Packers' first game without Brett Favre since 1992) in which Aaron Rodgers helped the Packers win, 24–19, and the Denver Broncos at the Oakland Raiders, where Jay Cutler and Eddie Royal led the Broncos in beating the Raiders, 41–14. Also, New England Patriots quarterback Tom Brady suffered a season-ending injury against the Kansas City Chiefs.

=== Flexible scheduling ===
The 2008 season also was the third season of the use of the "flexible scheduling" for Sunday games starting with Week 11.

As had happened in 2007, a team played on consecutive Sunday nights due to a game being moved into the Sunday night time slot. The originally scheduled New York Giants-Dallas Cowboys game on December 14 was followed by a flexed December 21 home game for the Giants against the Carolina Panthers; the Giants-Panthers game was flexed because it carried serious playoff implications, as the winner would clinch the NFC's top seed and home-field advantage throughout the playoffs. This was the second of three flexed games, with a December 7 interconference matchup between the Baltimore Ravens and Washington Redskins. The league filled the open spot on December 28 with a game between the Denver Broncos and San Diego Chargers with major playoff implications, as the winner of that game would win the AFC West and earn a home game in the playoffs while the loser would be eliminated.

=== International play ===
This was the second consecutive season that the league played at least one regular season game outside the United States as part of the NFL International Series. The contest between the San Diego Chargers and the New Orleans Saints was played at Wembley Stadium in London on October 26, with New Orleans winning 37–32. The Chargers played against the Buffalo Bills on the road the week beforehand on October 19 so they could immediately travel to London afterward in order to get used to the time difference.

The league has also approved the Bills' request to play at least one regular season home game at Toronto's Rogers Centre over each of the next five seasons. Team owner Ralph Wilson petitioned the league to play at least one game in Canada to strengthen his club's fan base in Ontario. The game in Toronto was on December 7, after the end of the 2008 CFL season, against the Miami Dolphins; Miami won 16–3. CBS televised both games regionally; the Toronto game was carried across Canada on Rogers Sportsnet and City TV.

=== Thanksgiving ===
The traditional Thanksgiving Day games were held on November 27, with the Detroit Lions hosting the Tennessee Titans at 12:30 p.m. EST on CBS (with the then 10–1 Titans handily defeating the then 0–11 Lions by a 47–10 score), and the Dallas Cowboys' home game following suit on Fox at 4:15 p.m. EST against the Seattle Seahawks (the Cowboys defeated the Seahawks by a score of 34–9). A third game on NFL Network, featuring the Arizona Cardinals and the Philadelphia Eagles followed at 8:15 p.m. EST. It was the first home game for the Eagles on Thanksgiving Day since 1940, and their first Thanksgiving game at any location since the infamous Bounty Bowl Game in 1989; the Eagles defeated the Cardinals by a score of 48–20. (The Cardinals and Eagles would, two months later, rematch in the NFC Championship Game, with Arizona winning this time by a score of 32–25.)

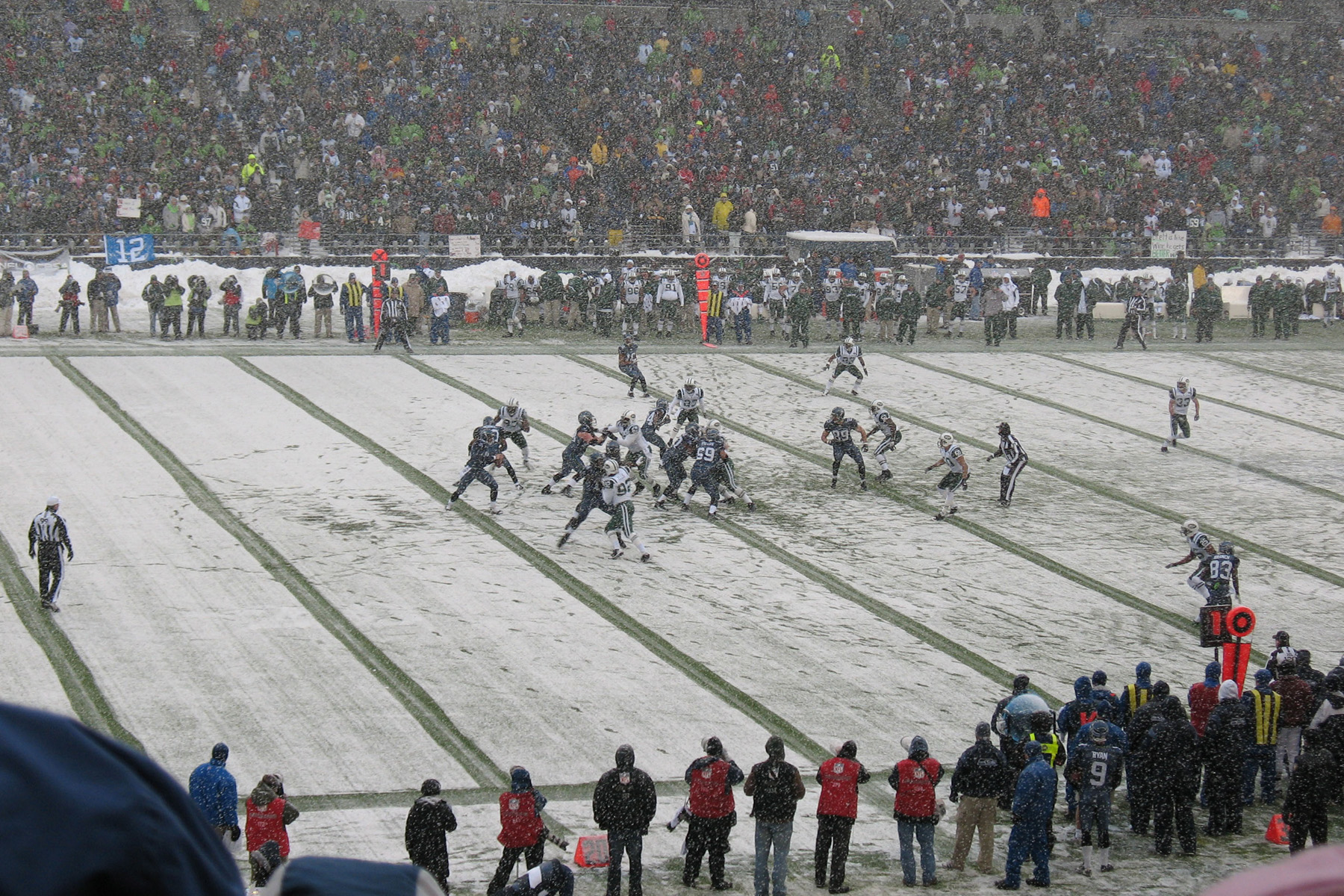
Seattle and the New York Jets play on December 21, 2008

=== Christmas ===
Despite NFL tradition to play games on Christmas if the holiday lands on a day of the week when the NFL normally plays, and the fact that Christmas landed on a Thursday in 2008, the NFL opted not to hold a Christmas game this season, instead scheduling all of its week 17 matchups for Sunday, December 28.

=== Pro Bowl ===
The NFL's Pro Bowl all-star game at the end of the season was played at Aloha Stadium in the Honolulu, Hawaii, for the 30th consecutive season. The league had the option under their current contract to hold the game elsewhere, including the possibility of moving it to the host site of the Super Bowl.

=== Schedule changes ===
Week 2: The Baltimore–Houston game, originally scheduled for Sunday at 4:15 p.m. ET, was postponed to Monday at 8:30 p.m. ET due to Hurricane Ike. The game was later postponed to November 9 at 1:00 p.m. ET on CBS.

Week 10: The Cincinnati–Houston game, originally scheduled for Sunday at 1:00 p.m. ET, was rescheduled to October 26 at 4:05 p.m. ET on CBS, to accommodate the Baltimore–Houston game from Week 2.

Week 11: The Tennessee–Jacksonville game, originally scheduled for 1:00 p.m. ET, was flexed to 4:15 p.m. ET on CBS.

Week 12: The Carolina–Atlanta game, originally scheduled for 1:00 p.m. ET, was flexed to 4:15 p.m. ET on Fox.

Week 14: The Washington–Baltimore game, originally scheduled for 1:00 p.m. ET on Fox, was flexed into NBC Sunday Night Football at 8:15 p.m. ET, replacing the New England–Seattle game, which was moved to 4:05 p.m. ET on CBS.

Week 15: The Denver–Carolina and Pittsburgh–Baltimore games, originally scheduled for 1:00 p.m. ET, were flexed to 4:15 p.m. ET on CBS.

Week 16:

- The Carolina–New York Giants game, originally scheduled for 1:00 p.m. ET on Fox, was flexed into NBC Sunday Night Football at 8:15 p.m. ET, replacing the San Diego–Tampa Bay game, which was moved to 1:00 p.m. ET on CBS.
- The Atlanta–Minnesota and Philadelphia–Washington games, originally scheduled for 1:00 p.m. ET, were flexed to 4:15 p.m. ET on Fox.

Week 17:

- The Denver–San Diego game, originally scheduled for 4:15 p.m. ET on CBS, was flexed into NBC Sunday Night Football at 8:15 p.m. ET. This game decided the AFC West champion.
- The Jacksonville–Baltimore and Miami–New York Jets games, originally scheduled for 1:00 p.m. ET, were flexed to 4:15 p.m. ET on CBS.
- The Dallas–Philadelphia game, originally scheduled for 1:00 p.m. ET, was flexed to 4:15 p.m. ET on Fox.

== Regular season standings ==
=== Division ===
AFC East
	W	L	T	PCT	DIV	CONF	PF	PA	STK
^{(3)} Miami Dolphins	11	5	0	.688	4–2	8–4	345	317	W5
New England Patriots	11	5	0	.688	4–2	7–5	410	309	W4
New York Jets	9	7	0	.563	4–2	7–5	405	356	L2
Buffalo Bills	7	9	0	.438	0–6	5–7	336	342	L1

AFC North
	W	L	T	PCT	DIV	CONF	PF	PA	STK
^{(2)} Pittsburgh Steelers	12	4	0	.750	6–0	10–2	347	223	W1
^{(6)} Baltimore Ravens	11	5	0	.688	4–2	8–4	385	244	W2
Cincinnati Bengals	4	11	1	.281	1–5	3–9	204	364	W3
Cleveland Browns	4	12	0	.250	1–5	3–9	232	350	L6

AFC South
	W	L	T	PCT	DIV	CONF	PF	PA	STK
^{(1)} Tennessee Titans	13	3	0	.813	4–2	9–3	375	234	L1
^{(5)} Indianapolis Colts	12	4	0	.750	4–2	10–2	377	298	W9
Houston Texans	8	8	0	.500	2–4	5–7	366	394	W1
Jacksonville Jaguars	5	11	0	.313	2–4	3–9	302	367	L2

AFC West
	W	L	T	PCT	DIV	CONF	PF	PA	STK
^{(4)} San Diego Chargers	8	8	0	.500	5–1	7–5	439	347	W4
Denver Broncos	8	8	0	.500	3–3	5–7	370	448	L3
Oakland Raiders	5	11	0	.313	2–4	4–8	263	388	W2
Kansas City Chiefs	2	14	0	.125	2–4	2–10	291	440	L4

NFC East
	W	L	T	PCT	DIV	CONF	PF	PA	STK
^{(1)} New York Giants	12	4	0	.750	4–2	9–3	427	294	L1
^{(6)} Philadelphia Eagles	9	6	1	.594	2–4	7–5	416	289	W1
Dallas Cowboys	9	7	0	.563	3–3	7–5	362	365	L2
Washington Redskins	8	8	0	.500	3–3	7–5	265	296	L1

NFC North
	W	L	T	PCT	DIV	CONF	PF	PA	STK
^{(3)} Minnesota Vikings	10	6	0	.625	4–2	8–4	379	333	W1
Chicago Bears	9	7	0	.563	4–2	7–5	375	350	L1
Green Bay Packers	6	10	0	.375	4–2	5–7	419	380	W1
Detroit Lions	0	16	0	.000	0–6	0–12	268	517	L16

NFC South
	W	L	T	PCT	DIV	CONF	PF	PA	STK
^{(2)} Carolina Panthers	12	4	0	.750	4–2	8–4	414	329	W1
^{(5)} Atlanta Falcons	11	5	0	.688	3–3	8–4	391	325	W3
Tampa Bay Buccaneers	9	7	0	.563	3–3	8–4	361	323	L4
New Orleans Saints	8	8	0	.500	2–4	5–7	463	393	L1

NFC West
	W	L	T	PCT	DIV	CONF	PF	PA	STK
^{(4)} Arizona Cardinals	9	7	0	.563	6–0	7–5	427	426	W1
San Francisco 49ers	7	9	0	.438	3–3	5–7	339	381	W2
Seattle Seahawks	4	12	0	.250	3–3	3–9	294	392	L1
St. Louis Rams	2	14	0	.125	0–6	2–10	232	465	L10

=== Conference ===
AFC
#	Team	Division	W	L	T	PCT	DIV	CONF	SOS	SOV	STK
Division leaders
1	Tennessee Titans	South	13	3	0	.813	4–2	9–3	.459	.425	L1
2	Pittsburgh Steelers	North	12	4	0	.750	6–0	10–2	.525	.458	W1
3 (Note: Miami finished ahead of New England in the AFC East based on better conference record.)	Miami Dolphins	East	11	5	0	.688	4–2	8–4	.461	.398	W5
4 (Note: San Diego finished ahead of Denver in the AFC West based on better division record.)	San Diego Chargers	West	8	8	0	.500	5–1	7–5	.516	.398	W4
Wild Cards
5	Indianapolis Colts	South	12	4	0	.750	4–2	10–2	.498	.492	W9
6 (Note: Baltimore clinched the AFC #6 seed over New England based on better conference record.)	Baltimore Ravens	North	11	5	0	.688	4–2	8–4	.521	.412	W2
Did not qualify for the postseason
7	New England Patriots	East	11	5	0	.688	4–2	7–5	.480	.403	W4
8	New York Jets	East	9	7	0	.563	4–2	7–5	.471	.462	L2
9 (Note: Houston finished ahead of Denver based on better winning percentage vs. common opponents (3–2 against 2–3 vs. Miami, Oakland, Jacksonville and Cleveland).)	Houston Texans	South	8	8	0	.500	2–4	5–7	.518	.410	W1
10	Denver Broncos	West	8	8	0	.500	3–3	5–7	.457	.438	L3
11	Buffalo Bills	East	7	9	0	.438	0–6	5–7	.453	.304	L1
12 (Note: Oakland finished ahead of Jacksonville based on better conference record.)	Oakland Raiders	West	5	11	0	.313	2–4	4–8	.520	.450	W2
13	Jacksonville Jaguars	South	5	11	0	.313	2–4	3–9	.537	.425	L2
14	Cincinnati Bengals	North	4	11	1	.281	1–5	3–9	.553	.297	W3
15	Cleveland Browns	North	4	12	0	.250	1–5	3–9	.572	.445	L6
16	Kansas City Chiefs	West	2	14	0	.125	2–4	2–10	.537	.406	L4
Tiebreakers (Note: When breaking ties for three or more teams under the NFL's rules, they are first broken within divisions, then comparing only the highest ranked remaining team from each division.)

NFC
#	Team	Division	W	L	T	PCT	DIV	CONF	SOS	SOV	STK
Division leaders
1 (Note: NY Giants clinched the NFC #1 seed over Carolina based on head-to-head victory.)	New York Giants	East	12	4	0	.750	4–2	9–3	.502	.500	L1
2	Carolina Panthers	South	12	4	0	.750	4–2	8–4	.488	.432	W1
3	Minnesota Vikings	North	10	6	0	.625	4–2	8–4	.504	.431	W1
4	Arizona Cardinals	West	9	7	0	.563	6–0	7–5	.486	.368	W1
Wild Cards
5	Atlanta Falcons	South	11	5	0	.688	3–3	8–4	.459	.403	W3
6	Philadelphia Eagles	East	9	6	1	.594	2–4	7–5	.514	.486	W1
Did not qualify for the postseason
7 (Note: Tampa Bay finished ahead of Dallas and Chicago based on better conference record.)	Tampa Bay Buccaneers	South	9	7	0	.563	3–3	8–4	.480	.431	L4
8 (Note: Dallas finished ahead of Chicago based on better strength of victory.)	Dallas Cowboys	East	9	7	0	.563	3–3	7–5	.498	.444	L2
9	Chicago Bears	North	9	7	0	.563	4–2	7–5	.475	.365	L1
10 (Note: Washington finished ahead of New Orleans based on a head-to-head victory.)	Washington Redskins	East	8	8	0	.500	3–3	7–5	.479	.414	L1
11	New Orleans Saints	South	8	8	0	.500	2–4	5–7	.496	.375	L1
12	San Francisco 49ers	West	7	9	0	.438	3–3	5–7	.447	.286	W2
13	Green Bay Packers	North	6	10	0	.375	4–2	5–7	.504	.365	W1
14	Seattle Seahawks	West	4	12	0	.250	3–3	3–9	.498	.313	L1
15	St. Louis Rams	West	2	14	0	.125	0–6	2–10	.533	.531	L10
16	Detroit Lions	North	0	16	0	.000	0–6	0–12	.559	–	L16
Tiebreakers (Note: When breaking ties for three or more teams under the NFL's rules, they are first broken within divisions, then comparing only the highest-ranked remaining team from each division.)

== Postseason ==
The playoffs began with Wild Card Weekend on January 3–4, 2009. The Divisional Playoffs were played on January 10–11 and the Conference Championship Games on January 18. Super Bowl XLIII was played on February 1 at Raymond James Stadium in Tampa, Florida, with the Pittsburgh Steelers winning their record sixth Super Bowl.

Within each conference, the four division winners and the top two non-division winners with the best overall regular season records) qualified for the playoffs. The four division winners are seeded 1–4 based on their overall won-lost-tied record, and the wild card teams are seeded 5–6. The NFL does not use a fixed bracket playoff system, and there are no restrictions regarding teams from the same division matching up in any round. In the first round, dubbed the wild-card playoffs or wild-card weekend, the third-seeded division winner hosts the sixth-seed wild card, and the fourth seed hosts the fifth. The 1 and 2 seeds from each conference received a first-round bye. In the second round, the divisional playoffs, the number 1 seed hosts the worst-surviving seed from the first round (seed 4, 5, or 6), while the number 2 seed will play the other team (seed 3, 4, or 5). The two surviving teams from each conference's divisional playoff games met in the respective AFC and NFC Conference Championship games, hosted by the higher seed. Although the Super Bowl, the championship round of the playoffs, is played at a neutral site, the designated home team is based on an annual rotation by conference.

Playoff seeds
Seed	AFC	NFC
1	Tennessee Titans (South winner)	New York Giants (East winner)
2	Pittsburgh Steelers (North winner)	Carolina Panthers (South winner)
3	Miami Dolphins (East winner)	Minnesota Vikings (North winner)
4	San Diego Chargers (West winner)	Arizona Cardinals (West winner)
5	Indianapolis Colts (wild card)	Atlanta Falcons (wild card)
6	Baltimore Ravens (wild card)	Philadelphia Eagles (wild card)

=== Playoffs bracket ===
Jan 4 – Dolphin Stadium	Jan 10 – LP Field
6	Baltimore	27
6	Baltimore	13
3	Miami	9	Jan 18 – Heinz Field
1	Tennessee	10
AFC
Jan 3 – Qualcomm Stadium	6	Baltimore	14
Jan 11 – Heinz Field
2	Pittsburgh	23
5	Indianapolis	17	AFC Championship
4	San Diego	24
4	San Diego	23*	Feb 1 – Raymond James Stadium
2	Pittsburgh	35
Wild-card round
Divisional round
Jan 4 – Hubert H. Humphrey Metrodome	A2	Pittsburgh	27
Jan 11 – Giants Stadium
N4	Arizona	23
6	Philadelphia	26	Super Bowl XLIII
6	Philadelphia	23
3	Minnesota	14	Jan 18 – University of Phoenix Stadium
1	NY Giants	11
NFC
Jan 3 – University of Phoenix Stadium	6	Philadelphia	25
Jan 10 – Bank of America Stadium
4	Arizona	32
5	Atlanta	24	NFC Championship
4	Arizona	33
4	Arizona	30
2	Carolina	13

* Indicates overtime victory

== Notable events ==
=== Detroit Lions going 0–16 ===
The 2008 Detroit Lions would mark the capstone of the ill decisions of President/General Manager Matt Millen since arriving on the job in 2001. After an 0–3 start, the Lions fired Millen on September 23 after seven seasons, during the team's bye week. During that time, the Lions compiled the worst record in the league (31–84, .270 percentage) and had many questionable draft choices.

However, by that point, the damage had been done. The Lions went on to lose every game and finished 0–16, the first winless season in the NFL since the strike-shortened 1982 NFL season saw the Baltimore Colts finish 0–8–1, and the first full-season imperfect season since the expansion 1976 Tampa Bay Buccaneers finished 0–14. It marked the first time that a non-expansion team, non-strike shortened team, non-merged team finished winless since the 1944 Brooklyn Tigers finished 0–10. It was the second winless season for the Lions, who finished 0–11 in 1942. The 0–16 record would be later matched by the 2017 Cleveland Browns.

=== Retirement/Unretirement of Brett Favre ===
The 2008 season marked the first time since September 20, 1992, that someone other than Brett Favre started at quarterback for the Green Bay Packers, as Aaron Rodgers became the new offensive "Leader of The Pack". At first, this was given Favre's announcement on March 4, 2008, that he would retire from the league after seventeen seasons. He owns many NFL records, including most wins as a quarterback, most touchdowns thrown, (broken by Peyton Manning in 2014) and most consecutive starts at quarterback, as well as most interceptions. He started every Packers game, regular season and postseason, for nearly sixteen full seasons (September 27, 1992 – January 20, 2008).

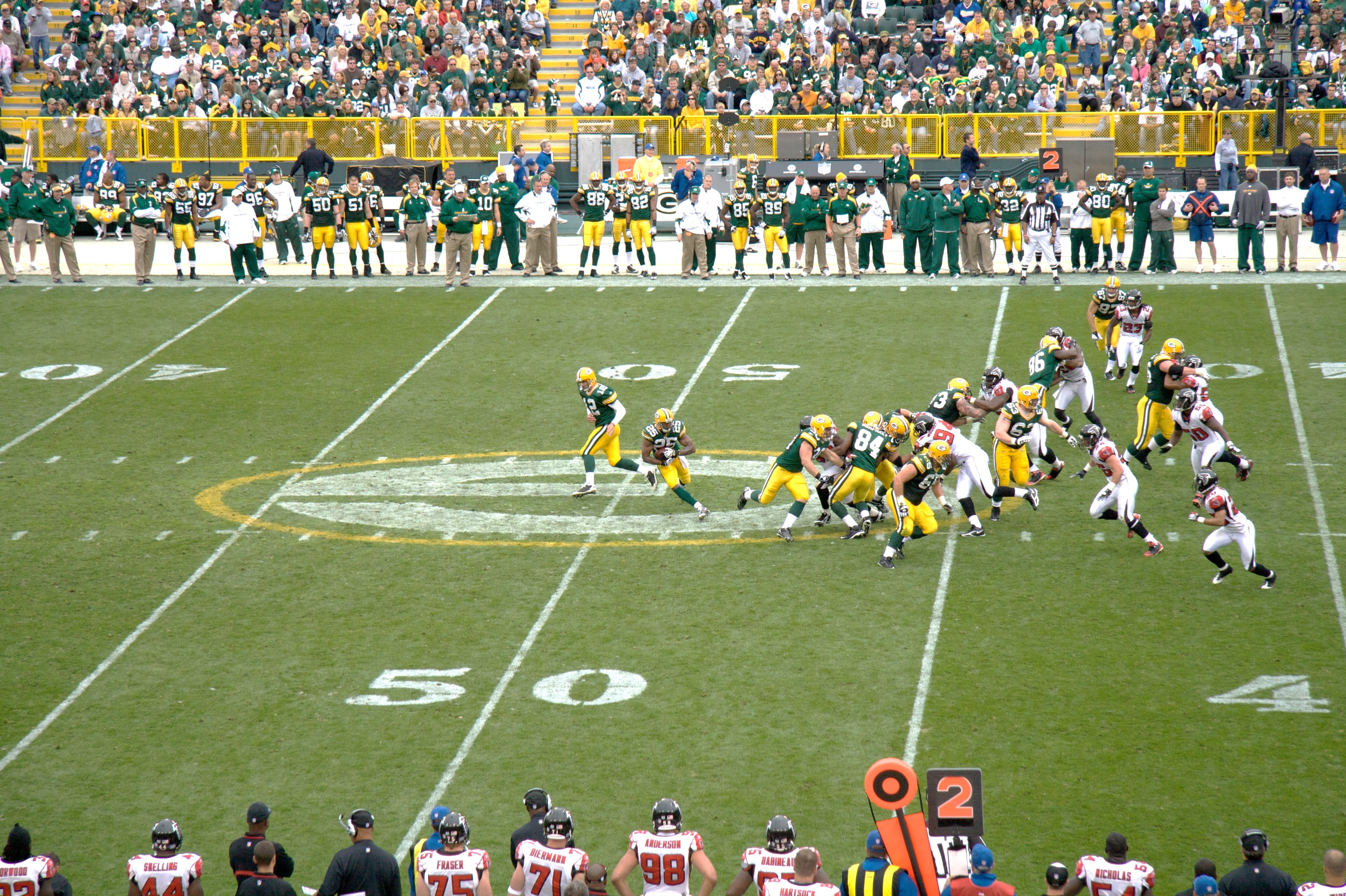
Aaron Rodgers hands off to Ryan Grant in Green Bay's week 5 encounter against the Atlanta Falcons

The Packers were scheduled to retire Favre's #4 jersey in a ceremony during the first week of the season. However, on July 2, 2008, he publicly indicated that he wanted to play again as the starting quarterback. On July 11, 2008, Favre sent a letter to the Packers management asking for an unconditional release which will allow him to play for another team. The Packers did not give it to him, but they were unwilling to release him for fear that he would sign with division rival Minnesota Vikings (Favre's choice for an alternate team). Also, the Packers would not start him as quarterback if he came back to the team, and named the other Packers quarterback Aaron Rodgers as the starting quarterback and Favre as the backup.

From July 14 to 15, Favre did TV interviews discussing his comeback, Rodgers taking his place, and frustrations on the Packers for not being honest with him, personally and publicly.

On July 16, 2008, the Packers filed tampering charges against the Vikings for alleged improper communication between Favre, Vikings head coach Brad Childress and Vikings offensive coordinator Darrell Bevell. Favre filed for reinstatement on July 29, 2008, and by August 4, NFL Commissioner Roger Goodell reinstated Favre.

Three days later on August 7, the Packers traded Favre to the New York Jets for a conditional draft pick. He played well for most of the year, but entering December he suffered a shoulder injury which dropped the Jets out of playoff contention. Favre again retired following the 2008 season. The Jets then released Favre in favor of moving in the direction of getting a star college quarterback in the draft, eventually landing Mark Sanchez. Another protracted "will he/won't he retire" saga emerged in 2009 which concluded in August of that year when Favre signed with, as expected, the Minnesota Vikings.

=== Hurricane Ike ===
Hurricane Ike forced several changes to the 2008 schedule. The Houston Texans' Week 2 home game against the Baltimore Ravens was first postponed to Monday, September 15, before Ike made landfall; damage to Reliant Stadium forced a further postponement, to Week 10, on Sunday, November 9, giving the Texans and the Ravens their bye weeks in Week 2. Furthermore, to accommodate this move, the Texans' home game against the Cincinnati Bengals was moved forward from November 9 to Sunday, October 26, pushing the Bengals' bye week from Week 8 to Week 10. Although no other games were postponed, Ike and its remnants also impacted several other Week 2 games on September 14.

The Texans ended up having to wait until Week 5 against the Indianapolis Colts to have their home opener, the latest an NFL team went into the season before playing at home since the New Orleans Saints played their entire schedule on the road in 2005 due to the damages of the city of New Orleans as a result of Hurricane Katrina. (Every other NFL team had at least one home game by the end of Week 2.) With the Ravens eventually advancing to the AFC Championship Game against the rival Pittsburgh Steelers (and having to enter the playoffs as a wild card team), the impromptu decision to give the Ravens and Texans their bye week so early in the season ended up having the unintended effect of the Ravens playing in an NFL-record 18 consecutive weeks without a break in the schedule.

=== New formations result in high scores ===
The 2008 season saw a marked increase in the use of two new offensive philosophies (at least for the NFL, these offenses previously saw extensive use in college or Canadian football for a few years): the "wildcat formation", a formation based on the halfback option play, the "spread offense", which uses multiple wide-receiver sets and the quarterback frequently in shotgun, and the "Suggs package", which features two quarterbacks on the field at once. In week 3 of the season, the wildcat formation, used up until this point primarily as a trick play, was used eight times, including four times in a Miami Dolphins game and three times in a game between the Oakland Raiders and Buffalo Bills. Season-ending injuries to the starting and backup quarterbacks for the Chiefs prompted the team's offensive coordinator Chan Gailey to switch to a spread offense after six games. In Baltimore, the Ravens, led by rookie head coach John Harbaugh, implemented the "Suggs package", which places two quarterbacks on the field at once, Joe Flacco and Troy Smith. Due mainly to the new formations, 837 points were scored league wide in Week 12, the most ever for one NFL weekend. The wildcat formation in particular was credited with turning the Miami Dolphins from a last-place team into the winner of the AFC East, and four of the top ten plays ranked by NFL.com were directly based on the wildcat (two others featured wide receivers throwing passes).

=== Tie game ===
On November 16, during Week 11, a game between the Philadelphia Eagles and the Cincinnati Bengals at Paul Brown Stadium ended in a 13–13 tie, the first NFL tie game since November 10, 2002, when the Atlanta Falcons and the Pittsburgh Steelers ended in a 34–34 draw. After the game, Donovan McNabb mentioned that he did not know there were ties in the NFL, apparently confusing the NFL's postseason rules (where teams can and have played double overtime games because those contests continue until a team finally wins) with the regular season rules. This drew the ire of many fans, who thought that a quarterback of his caliber should know some fundamental rules; however, none of McNabb's critics accused him of not playing to win during the overtime period in Cincinnati, and his play was tied into a game that was widely derided as one of the ugliest, most disjointed, and controversial results in NFL history.

Ironically, the tie game ultimately helped the Eagles make the playoffs, as it was the deciding tiebreaker for the #6 seed in the NFC; the Eagles went on to lose to the Cardinals in the NFC Championship Game.

No more games would end in a tie until 2012.

=== Tributes ===
==== St. Louis Rams and Georgia Frontiere ====
On January 18, 2008, Georgia Frontiere, owner of the St. Louis Rams died due to complications with breast cancer. The Rams wore a commemorative patch in her honor, with her signature on their left shoulder.

==== Kansas City Chiefs and Lamar Hunt ====
On January 31, 2008, Clark Hunt, chairman of the board for the Kansas City Chiefs announced that henceforth the team's Lamar Hunt/American Football League tribute patch that was introduced in the 2007 season will be a permanent part of the Chiefs' uniform. joining the Chicago Bears (with George Halas) and the Cleveland Browns (with Al Lerner) with such a patch.

==== Tim Russert ====
The stretch of highway outside Ralph Wilson Stadium along U.S. Route 20A in Orchard Park, New York, has been named the Timothy J. Russert Highway. Russert, who was NBC News's chief Washington bureau correspondent and the host of Meet the Press, was a Buffalo native and noted Buffalo Bills fan. He died of a heart attack in June 2008.

==== Gene Upshaw ====
The league honored National Football League Players Association leader Gene Upshaw, who died suddenly at age 63 on August 20 just three days after being diagnosed with pancreatic cancer. For the entire season, the Oakland Raiders wore a patch on the left chest of the jerseys with the initials "GU" and his number 63, his jersey number with the Raiders. All NFL teams also honored Upshaw with a video tribute and a replica of the uniform patch painted onto the field during the opening weekend. Originally, the patch on the field and the video tribute were only going to be done in Oakland at the Raiders' home opener against the Denver Broncos as Upshaw played his entire 15-year Hall of Fame career with the Raiders, and at Giants Stadium, when the Giants and Redskins opened the NFL season on September 4. All players wore the same patch during Week One, and later changed to a smaller helmet decal. The Raiders wore the patch through the remainder of the season.

==== Sean Taylor ====
The Washington Redskins honored the anniversary of death of Sean Taylor this season in a home game against the visiting New York Giants.

=== Steelers ownership restructure ===
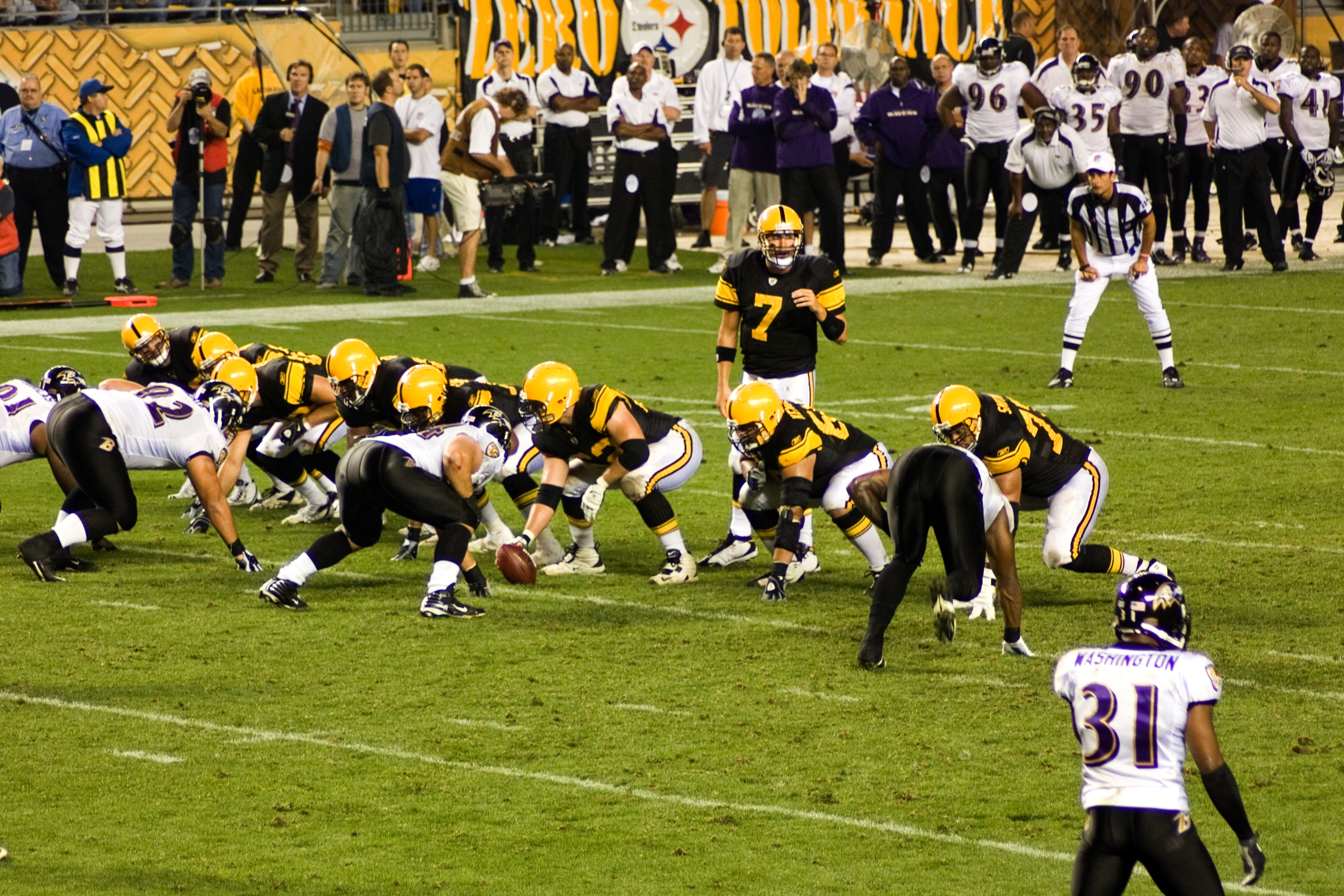
The eventual NFL champion Steelers (in throwbacks) in week 4 against Baltimore, the eventual AFC runner-up

On July 7, 2008, owners of the Pittsburgh Steelers, including Art Rooney's five sons who own 80% of the franchise, looked to restructure the ownership plan of the franchise in order to comply with NFL ownership regulations. Current Steelers Chairman, Dan Rooney, and his son, Art Rooney II, President of the franchise, wished to stay involved with the franchise, while the remainder of the brothers – Art Jr., Timothy, Patrick and John – wished to further pursue racetracks that they own in Florida and New York. Since 2006, many of the racetracks have added video slot machines, causing them to violate "NFL policy that prohibits involvement with racetrack and gambling interests". On July 11, it was confirmed that investor Stanley Druckenmiller had been in discussion with the five Rooney brothers. A Steelers fan for many years, Druckenmiller "has been known to paint his face black and gold" during games. Coach Mike Tomlin stated that the situation could become a distraction, but "I'm here to coach, they're [the players] here to play. Those questions will be answered by the Rooneys." On September 18, Druckenmiller withdrew his bid to purchase the team.

NFL owners unanimously approved the restructuring of ownership on December 17, 2008, with Dan and Art II getting the mandated 30% stake. Meanwhile, brothers Timothy and Patrick (the ones who own race tracks with slot machines, which violate NFL ownership rules) sold their shares outright, while Art Jr., John, and the McGinley family sold some shares but retained smaller ownership roles, with the brothers reducing their shares from 16% to 6% and the McGinley family reducing their shares from 20% to 10%. Joining the ownership group were Pilot Travel Centers president Jim Haslam III, Legendary Pictures president and CEO Thomas Tull, and the Paul family each getting a 16% stake in the team. Dan Rooney mentioned he has no ill will towards Druckenmiller, mentioning he's a great Steelers fan and wishes he remains one.

== Milestones ==
The following teams and players set all-time NFL records during the regular season:

Record	Player/team	Date broken/opponent	Previous record holder
Longest field goal attempt (76 yards)	Sebastian Janikowski, Oakland	September 28, vs San Diego	Mark Moseley, Nov 25, 1979 (74 yards)
Most receiving yards by a Tight End, career (10,887 yards)	Tony Gonzalez, Kansas City	October 5, at Carolina	Shannon Sharpe, 1990–2003 (10,060)
Longest overtime blocked punt return for a touchdown (3 yards)	Monty Beisel, Arizona	October 12, vs Dallas	None, first time in NFL history
Longest overtime field goal (57 yards)	Sebastian Janikowski, Oakland	October 19, vs NY Jets	Chris Jacke, Oct 4, 1996 (53)
Consecutive games with 6+ receptions, start of season (11 games)	Wes Welker, New England	November 9, vs Buffalo	Jimmy Smith, 2001 (8)
Consecutive games with 400+ yards passing (2)	Matt Cassel, New England	November 17, vs NY Jets, Miami	Billy Volek, Dan Marino, Dan Fouts, Phil Simms (2)
Longest interception return (108 yards)	Ed Reed, Baltimore	November 23, vs Philadelphia	Ed Reed, Nov 7, 2004 (106)
Most passing yards, first 10 weeks of season (3,254 yards)	Drew Brees, New Orleans	November 23, vs Green Bay	Dan Fouts 1982 (3,164 yards)
Highest total points scored in a single week (837 points)	All 32 teams	2008 Week 12 (Nov 20–24)	Tied 3 times: 2002 Week 1 (Sept 5–9); 2004 Week 13 (Dec 5–6); and 2007 Week 17 (Dec 29–30) (788 points)
Longest regular season interception return without TD (98 yards)	Brandon McDonald, Cleveland	December 15, at Philadelphia	Julius Peppers October 10, 2004 (97 yards)
Most consecutive games lost, start of season (16)	Detroit Lions	December 21, vs New Orleans	1976 Tampa Bay Buccaneers and 1980 New Orleans Saints (both started season 0–14)
Most consecutive games lost, end of season (16)	Detroit Lions	December 28, vs Green Bay	2001 Carolina Panthers (15)
Most games lost, season (16)	Detroit Lions	December 28, vs Green Bay	Tied by 8 teams (15) (Note: 1980 New Orleans Saints, 1989 Dallas Cowboys, 1990 New England Patriots, 1991 Indianapolis Colts, 1996 New York Jets, 2000 San Diego Chargers, 2001 Carolina Panthers and 2007 Miami Dolphins.)
Fewest sacks by a team, season (10)	Kansas City Chiefs	Cincinnati Bengals	1982 Baltimore Colts (11)
Fewest accepted penalties, 16-game season (58)	New England Patriots	December 28, vs Buffalo Bills	Seattle Seahawks, 2007 (59)
Most wins without making playoffs, since 1990 (11)	New England Patriots	December 28	Kansas City Chiefs, 2005, and Cleveland Browns, 2007 (10). (1990 was the year the playoff field expanded to its current 12 teams. The last team to miss with 11 games won was the 1985 Denver Broncos, at a time when only 10 teams made it into the playoffs.)
Lowest winning percentage while still making playoffs, non-strike season (.500)	San Diego Chargers	December 28	Tied with multiple teams (Note: 1985 Cleveland Browns, 1990 New Orleans Saints, 1991 New York Jets, 1999 Dallas Cowboys, 1999 Detroit Lions, 2004 St. Louis Rams, 2004 Minnesota Vikings and 2006 New York Giants.) (Note: Only two teams had ever made the playoffs with losing records, both of them being in the strike-shortened 1982 season, when two teams with 4–5 records made it into an expanded 16-team playoff field.)
Most Super Bowl wins, team (6)	Pittsburgh Steelers	February 1 vs. Arizona Cardinals	San Francisco 49ers, Dallas Cowboys (5 each)

== Regular season statistical leaders ==
Team
Points scored	New Orleans Saints (463)
Total yards gained	New Orleans Saints (6,571)
Yards rushing	New York Giants (2,518)
Yards passing	New Orleans Saints (5,069)
Fewest points allowed	Pittsburgh Steelers (223)
Fewest total yards allowed	Pittsburgh Steelers (3,795)
Fewest rushing yards allowed	Minnesota Vikings (1,230)
Fewest passing yards allowed	Pittsburgh Steelers (2,511)
Individual
Scoring	Stephen Gostkowski, New England (148 points)
Touchdowns	DeAngelo Williams, Carolina (20 TDs)
Most field goals made	Stephen Gostkowski, New England (36 FGs)
Rushing	Adrian Peterson, Minnesota (1,760 yards)
Passer rating	Philip Rivers, San Diego (105.5 rating)
Passing touchdowns	Drew Brees, New Orleans and Philip Rivers, San Diego (34 TDs)
Passing yards	Drew Brees, New Orleans (5,069 yards)
Pass receptions	Andre Johnson, Houston (115 catches)
Pass receiving yards	Andre Johnson, Houston (1,575 yards)
Punt returns	Santana Moss, Washington (6 for 124 yards, 20.7 average yards)
Kickoff returns	Domenik Hixon, New York Giants (3 for 180 yards, 60.0 average yards)not enough to qualify
Interceptions	Ed Reed, Baltimore (9)
Punting	Shane Lechler, Oakland (90 for 4,391 yards, 48.8 average yards)
Sacks	DeMarcus Ware, Dallas (20)

== Awards ==
=== Regular season awards ===
Award	Player	Position	Team
Most Valuable Player	Peyton Manning	Quarterback	Indianapolis Colts
Coach of the Year	Mike Smith	Head coach	Atlanta Falcons
Offensive Player of the Year	Drew Brees	Quarterback	New Orleans Saints
Defensive Player of the Year	James Harrison	Linebacker	Pittsburgh Steelers
Offensive Rookie of the Year	Matt Ryan	Quarterback	Atlanta Falcons
Defensive Rookie of the Year	Jerod Mayo	Linebacker	New England Patriots
NFL Comeback Player of the Year	Chad Pennington	Quarterback	Miami Dolphins
Walter Payton NFL Man of the Year	Kurt Warner	Quarterback	Arizona Cardinals
Super Bowl Most Valuable Player Award	Santonio Holmes	Wide receiver	Pittsburgh Steelers

=== All-Pro team ===
Offense
Quarterback	Peyton Manning, Indianapolis
Running back	Adrian Peterson, Minnesota
Fullback	Le'Ron McClain, Baltimore
Wide receiver	Andre Johnson, Houston; Larry Fitzgerald, Arizona
Tight end	Tony Gonzalez, Kansas City
Offensive tackle	Jordan Gross, Carolina; Michael Roos, Tennessee
Offensive guard	Steve Hutchinson, Minnesota; Chris Snee, New York Giants
Center	Kevin Mawae, Tennessee

Defense
Defensive end	Justin Tuck, New York Giants; Jared Allen, Minnesota
Defensive tackle	Albert Haynesworth, Tennessee; Kevin Williams, Minnesota
Outside linebacker	DeMarcus Ware, Dallas; James Harrison, Pittsburgh
Inside linebacker	Ray Lewis, Baltimore; Jon Beason, Carolina
Cornerback	Nnamdi Asomugha, Oakland; Cortland Finnegan, Tennessee
Safety	Ed Reed, Baltimore; Troy Polamalu, Pittsburgh

Special teams
Kicker	Stephen Gostkowski, New England
Punter	Shane Lechler, Oakland Raiders
Kick returner	Leon Washington, New York Jets

=== Team superlatives ===
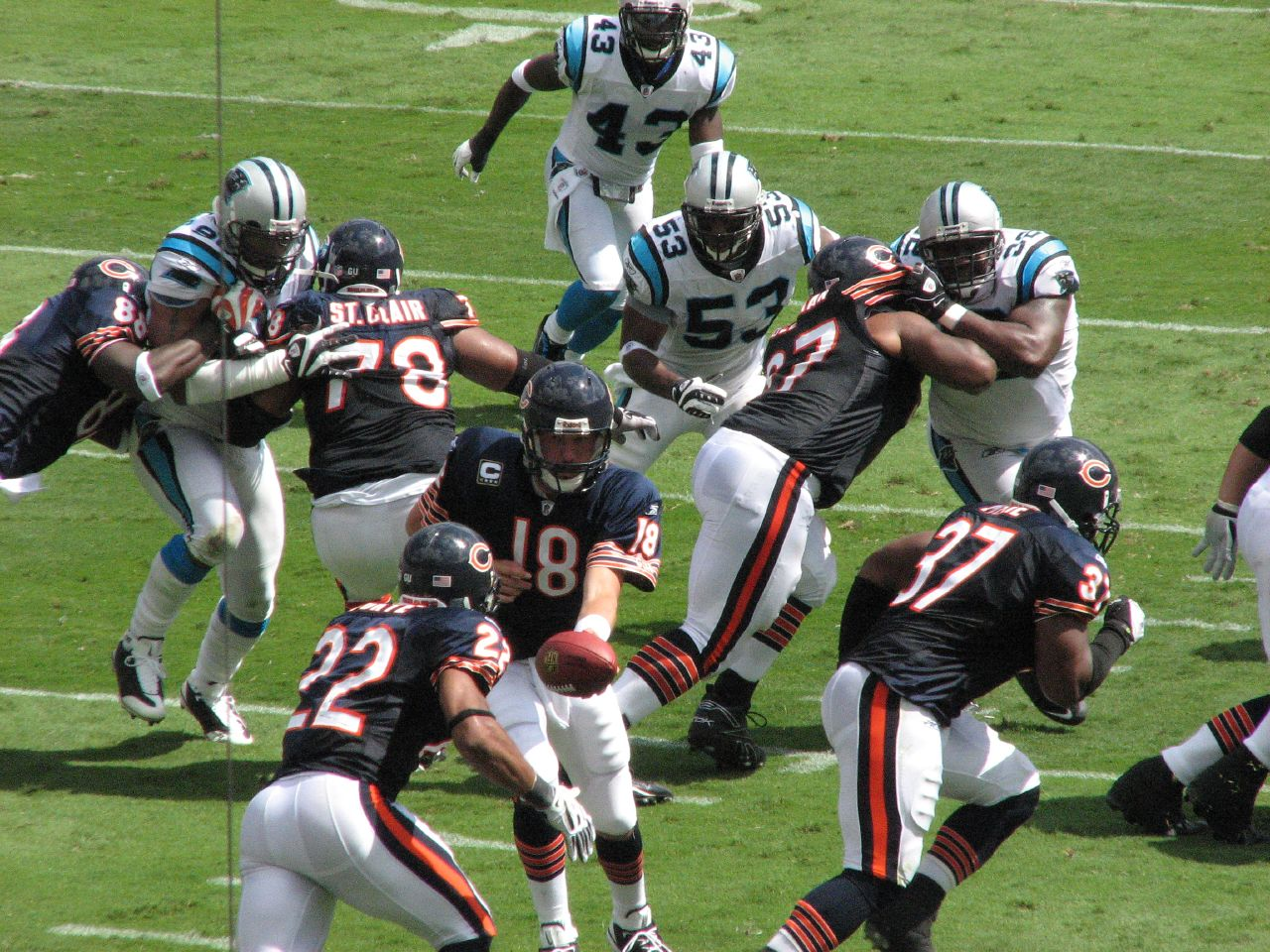
2008 NFC South champions Carolina against Chicago in week 2 of the season

==== Offense ====
- Most points scored: New Orleans, 463
- Fewest points scored: Cleveland, 204
- Most total offensive yards: New Orleans, 6,571
- Fewest total offensive yards: Cincinnati, 3,926
- Most total passing yards: New Orleans, 4,977
- Fewest total passing yards: Oakland, 2,369
- Most rushing yards: New York Giants, 2,518
- Fewest rushing yards: Arizona, 1,178

==== Defense ====
- Fewest points allowed: Pittsburgh, 223
- Most points allowed: Detroit, 517
- Fewest total yards allowed: Pittsburgh, 3,795
- Most total yards allowed: Detroit, 6,470
- Fewest passing yards allowed: Pittsburgh, 2,511
- Most passing yards allowed: Seattle, 4,149
- Fewest rushing yards allowed: Minnesota, 1,230
- Most rushing yards allowed: Detroit, 2,754

=== Players of the Week ===
Week/Month	Offensive		Defensive		Special teams	
Week/Month	AFC	NFC	AFC	NFC	AFC	NFC
1	RB Willie Parker (Pittsburgh)	RB Michael Turner (Atlanta)	CB Cortland Finnegan (Tennessee)	DE Adewale Ogunleye (Chicago)	WR-KR Roscoe Parrish (Buffalo)	KR/PR Will Blackmon (Green Bay)
2	WR Brandon Marshall (Denver)	QB Kurt Warner (Arizona)	S Troy Polamalu (Pittsburgh)	S Chris Horton (Washington)	LB Keith Bulluck (Tennessee)	KR/RB Felix Jones (Dallas)
3	RB Ronnie Brown (Miami)	RB Michael Turner (Atlanta)	CB Antonio Cromartie (San Diego)	S Brian Dawkins (Philadelphia)	K Josh Scobee (Jacksonville)	K John Carney (NY Giants)
4	QB Brett Favre (NY Jets)	QB Jake Delhomme (Carolina)	LB Derrick Johnson (Kansas City)	LB Derrick Brooks (Tampa Bay)	K Jeff Reed (Pittsburgh)	K Matt Bryant (Tampa Bay)
Sept.	QB Jay Cutler (Denver)	QB Drew Brees (New Orleans)	DT Albert Haynesworth (Tennessee)	S Charles Woodson (Green Bay)	RB Darren Sproles (San Diego)	Saverio Rocca (Philadelphia)
5	QB Ben Roethlisberger (Pittsburgh)	RB Clinton Portis (Washington)	LB Gary Brackett (Indianapolis)	CB Antoine Winfield (Minnesota)	K Matt Prater (Denver)	PR/RB Reggie Bush (New Orleans)
6	QB Peyton Manning (Indianapolis)	QB Drew Brees (New Orleans)	CB Eric Wright (Cleveland)	S Oshiomogho Atogwe (St. Louis)	WR-PR Jacoby Jones (Houston)	WR Sean Morey (Arizona)
7	QB Matt Cassel (New England)	RB Steven Jackson (St. Louis)	LB Terrell Suggs (Baltimore)	S Aaron Rouse (Green Bay)	K Sebastian Janikowski (Oakland)	S Zackary Bowman (Chicago)
8	QB Chad Pennington (Miami)	QB Drew Brees (New Orleans)	S Chris Hope (Tennessee)	DE Mathias Kiwanuka (NY Giants)	WR-PR Jacoby Jones (Houston)	PR/WR Santana Moss (Washington)
Oct.	WR Andre Johnson (Houston)	RB Clinton Portis (Washington)	LB Joey Porter (Miami)	LB Jon Beason (Carolina)	K Stephen Gostkowski (New England)	K Josh Brown (St. Louis)
9	QB Joe Flacco (Baltimore)	QB Matt Ryan (Atlanta)	DT Kris Jenkins (NY Jets)	S Antrel Rolle (Arizona)	K Adam Vinatieri (Indianapolis)	KR/PR Clifton Smith (Tampa Bay)
10	QB Jay Cutler (Denver)	RB Adrian Peterson (Minnesota)	LB Ray Lewis (Baltimore)	DE Julius Peppers (Carolina)	P Craig Hentrich ((Tennessee)	LB Chase Blackburn (NY Giants)
11	QB Peyton Manning (Indianapolis)	QB Shaun Hill (San Francisco)	LB James Harrison (Pittsburgh)	CB Aaron Ross (NY Giants)	KR-RB Leon Washington (NY Jets)	K Neil Rackers (Arizona)
12	QB Matt Cassel (New England)	QB Drew Brees (New Orleans)	S Ed Reed (Baltimore)	CB Ronde Barber (Tampa Bay)	PR-WR Johnnie Lee Higgins (Oakland)	PR/WR Harry Douglas (Atlanta)
13	RB Steve Slaton (Houston)	RB Brian Westbrook (Philadelphia)	DE Robert Mathis (Indianapolis)	DE Jared Allen (Minnesota)	CB Maurice Leggett (Kansas City)	KR/PR Mark Jones (Carolina)
Nov.	RB Thomas Jones (NY Jets)	QB Eli Manning (NY Giants)	DE Dwight Freeney (Indianapolis)	DE Julius Peppers (Carolina)	K Dan Carpenter (Miami)	KR/PR Clifton Smith (Tampa Bay)
14	QB Matt Schaub (Houston)	RB DeAngelo Williams (Carolina)	S Ed Reed (Baltimore)	LB Gerald Hayes (Arizona)	K Dan Carpenter (Miami)	RB/KR Pierre Thomas (New Orleans)
15	QB Philip Rivers (San Diego)	QB Tarvaris Jackson (Minnesota)	DE Aaron Smith (Pittsburgh)	LB DeMarcus Ware (Dallas)	KR-CB Ellis Hobbs (New England)	KR/S Danieal Manning (Chicago)
16	QB Peyton Manning (Indianapolis)	RB Derrick Ward (NY Giants)	CB Leon Hall (Cincinnati)	CB Josh Wilson (Seattle)	P Sam Koch (Baltimore)	P Ryan Plackemeier (Washington)
17	QB Chad Pennington (Miami)	RB Michael Turner (Atlanta)	S Tyrone Carter (Pittsburgh)	DE Chris Clemons (Philadelphia)	P Chris Hanson (New England)	K Ryan Longwell (Minnesota)
Dec.	QB Philip Rivers (San Diego)	RB DeAngelo Williams (Carolina)	S Ed Reed (Baltimore)	S Brian Dawkins (Philadelphia)	KR/PR Justin Miller (NY Jets)	K Robbie Gould (Chicago)

== Head coach/front office changes ==
=== Head coach ===
Offseason

The following teams hired new head coaches prior to the start of the 2008 season:

Team	2008 Coach	Former Coach(es)	Reason for leaving	Notes
Atlanta Falcons	Mike Smith, Jacksonville Jaguars defensive coordinator	Bobby Petrino; Emmitt Thomas, interim for 3 games	Petrino resigned after 13 games to take the head coaching job at the University of Arkansas.	In his first and only season, Petrino went 3–10 before resigning. Under interim head coach Thomas, the Falcons went 1–2 over the remainder of the season. Thomas would be inducted into the Pro Football Hall of Fame in 2008 and remain as a special assistant coach for the Falcons.
Baltimore Ravens	John Harbaugh, Philadelphia Eagles special teams coach	Brian Billick	Fired	Billick coached the Ravens to a victory in Super Bowl XXXV, and was 80–64 with the Ravens in the regular season and 5–3 in the postseason, but went 5–11 in 2007, the worst record the Ravens had in his nine-year tenure. Became a color commentator for Fox Sports in 2008.
Miami Dolphins	Tony Sparano, Dallas Cowboys assistant head coach/offensive line coach	Cam Cameron	Fired	In his first and only season, the Cameron-led Dolphins finished with a league worst 1–15 record. After his sacking, Cameron became John Harbaugh's offensive coordinator at Baltimore.
Washington Redskins	Jim Zorn, Seattle Seahawks quarterbacks coach	Joe Gibbs	Retired	Finished 16 overall seasons as Redskins head coach. During his first tenure, 1981–92, the club won three Super Bowls (XVII, XXII, and XXVI) and four NFC Championships (1982, 1983, 1987 and 1991). After being inducted into the Pro Football Hall of Fame in 1996, he rejoined the team in 2004, and returned to running the day-to-day operations of his self-owned racing team after his second retirement.

In-season

The following head coaches were fired during the 2008 season:

Team	Interim Coach	Former Coach	Reason for leaving	Notes
St. Louis Rams	Jim Haslett, defensive coordinator; former head coach of the New Orleans Saints	Scott Linehan	Dismissed September 29 four games into the season	Linehan went 11–25 (.306 percentage) in his 2¼ seasons as Rams coach. After Haslett was named interim head coach, the Rams won two straight games against Washington and Dallas, but dropped the final 10 games of the season. On January 15, 2009, Haslett learned he would not be considered for the permanent head coach position. Haslett became the coach of the new United Football League's Orlando franchise.
Oakland Raiders	Tom Cable, offensive line coach	Lane Kiffin	Relieved of duties September 30 after four games	Kiffin was fired in spite of being hired as the youngest coach in the NFL one year earlier, as shown by a 5–15 record (.250 percentage) in his 1¼ seasons as the fourth coach since Jon Gruden left. A dispute with owner Al Davis was said to be behind his dismissal, but Kiffin got a new job as coach of the University of Tennessee in December. Cable was named permanent head coach following back-to-back wins over Houston and at Tampa Bay, where the Buccaneers were eliminated from playoff contention.
San Francisco 49ers	Mike Singletary, assistant head coach and linebackers coach	Mike Nolan	Fired October 20 after seven games	The son of former coach Dick Nolan went 18–37 (.327 percentage) after nearly 3½ seasons as 49ers coach. Singletary had the interim tag removed following their 27–21 win over the Redskins on December 28, signing a four-year extension.

The firing of Kiffin and Linehan marked the first time since the AFL–NFL merger in 1970 that multiple head coaches were fired before Week 5 of the season, and the first since 1989 that any coach was fired this early in a season. Both were released heading into their teams' respective bye weeks, while Nolan was released prior to the game just before the 49ers' bye.

=== Front office ===
Offseason

Team	Position	2007 office holder	Reason for leaving	2008 replacement	Notes
Atlanta Falcons	GM	Rich McKay	Replaced	Thomas Dimitroff	The hiring of Dimitroff as general manager relegates McKay to the position of team president.
Buffalo Bills	GM	Marv Levy	Retired	Russ Brandon	Although his title did not change, Brandon became de facto general manager after Levy retired.
Denver Broncos	GM	Ted Sundquist	Fired	Jim Goodman (interim)	Although Sundquist was fired in early March, Goodman is considered the interim general manager.
Miami Dolphins	GM	Randy Mueller	Fired	Jeff Ireland	Ireland and new-executive vice president of football operations Bill Parcells had worked together previously, when Parcells was the head coach and football operations boss at the Dallas Cowboys from 2003-2006.
San Francisco 49ers	GM	Mike Nolan	GM duties revoked	Scot McCloughan	Before the promotion of McCloughan, head coach Mike Nolan acted as his own general manager.

In-season

Team	Position	Departing office holder	Reason for leaving	Interim replacement	Notes
Detroit Lions	President & GM	Matt Millen	Fired	Martin Mayhew	After a 0-3 start to the 2008 season, Lions vice chairman and Ford Motor Company Executive Chairman William Clay Ford Jr., told reporters on September 22, 2008, if it were up to him, he would fire Millen. Despite this, the elder Ford claimed he had no plans to dismiss Millen. Two days later, however, on September 24, 2008, Millen's tenure as team president and general manager ended. Lions owner William Clay Ford later announced that Millen had been relieved of his duties as Lions general manager and team president. Senior vice president and assistant general manager Martin Mayhew was named the interim general manager. On December 28th, 2008, Mayhew was promoted to permanent general manager.
St. Louis Rams	GM	Jay Zygmunt	Resigned	Billy Devaney	Zygmunt resigned on December 22nd, 2008, the day after a week 16 loss to the San Francisco 49ers that dropped the Ram's record to 2–13. The Rams hired Devaney as vice president of pro personnel in February 2008 to help conduct their 2008 draft. He was promoted to general manager of the Rams after Zygmunt's resignation.

== Stadium changes ==
In addition to the Bills playing one home game in Toronto's Rogers Centre, this was the first season that the Indianapolis Colts played their home games at Lucas Oil Stadium.

2008 was the final year that the Dallas Cowboys played at Texas Stadium; they moved to Cowboys Stadium in Arlington, Texas, in 2009.

McAfee Coliseum reverted to the Oakland Coliseum after McAfee declined to renew the naming rights. In addition, Monster Park reverted to Candlestick Park permanently after the naming right deal with Monster Cable expired, per the terms of Proposition H, passed by San Francisco voters in 2004, that prohibited the city from accepting another naming rights deals for that stadium.

== Uniforms ==
The Tennessee Titans switched their home jerseys. They changed their alternate Columbia blue jersey to make it their primary color while the navy blue jersey became the alternate jersey.

The Denver Broncos brought back the alternate orange jerseys after a three-year hiatus and wore them for games against the New Orleans Saints and Kansas City Chiefs.

In their first two home games, the New England Patriots wore their white jerseys against the Kansas City Chiefs and Miami Dolphins. It was the first time the Patriots had worn white at home since 1994.

For the first time in the team's history, the Oakland Raiders wore their white jerseys at home against the San Diego Chargers.

=== New league logo ===
2008 was the first season that the NFL used a new, updated logo. Unveiled on August 31, 2007, in USA Today, the new design features eight white stars, representing each of the league's eight divisions, instead of 25 on the old logo. The football has been redesigned and rotated to the same angle as the one on the top of the Vince Lombardi Trophy given to the Super Bowl champion. Darker shades of red and blue, specifically navy blue, are also used, along with font lettering to that of the league's current typeface for other logos. The new logo officially made its debut during the 2008 NFL draft on April 26.

=== Apparel ===
The 2008 season marked just the third time in the salary cap era (and first since 2001) that no NFL team made major changes to their uniforms or logo. Since 1993, half of the league's teams (Arizona, Atlanta, Buffalo, Cincinnati, Denver, Minnesota, New England, New York Giants, New York Jets, Philadelphia, San Diego, San Francisco, Seattle, St. Louis, Tampa Bay, and Tennessee) have completely redesigned their uniforms (The Patriots doing it four times, though none since 2000) while another five (Detroit, Green Bay, Miami, New Orleans, and Pittsburgh) making minor, though noticeable, changes. The Titans are swapping home and alternate designations on their light blue and navy blue jerseys though.

The Detroit Lions, in celebration of their 75th season in Motown as well as by popular demand by the fans, abandoned their black third jerseys in favor of their 1950s style throwback uniforms. They wore these uniforms against Jacksonville (November 9) and Tennessee (Thanksgiving Day – November 27). In addition, the Pittsburgh Steelers will make their throwbacks from the previous season their alternate uniform, wearing them against the Baltimore Ravens on September 29 and the New York Giants on October 26. The Jets wore their New York Titans throwbacks at home against Arizona on September 28 and Cincinnati on October 12 this season, and the Bills donned their retro uniforms at home against Oakland Raiders September 21.

== Media ==
=== Television ===
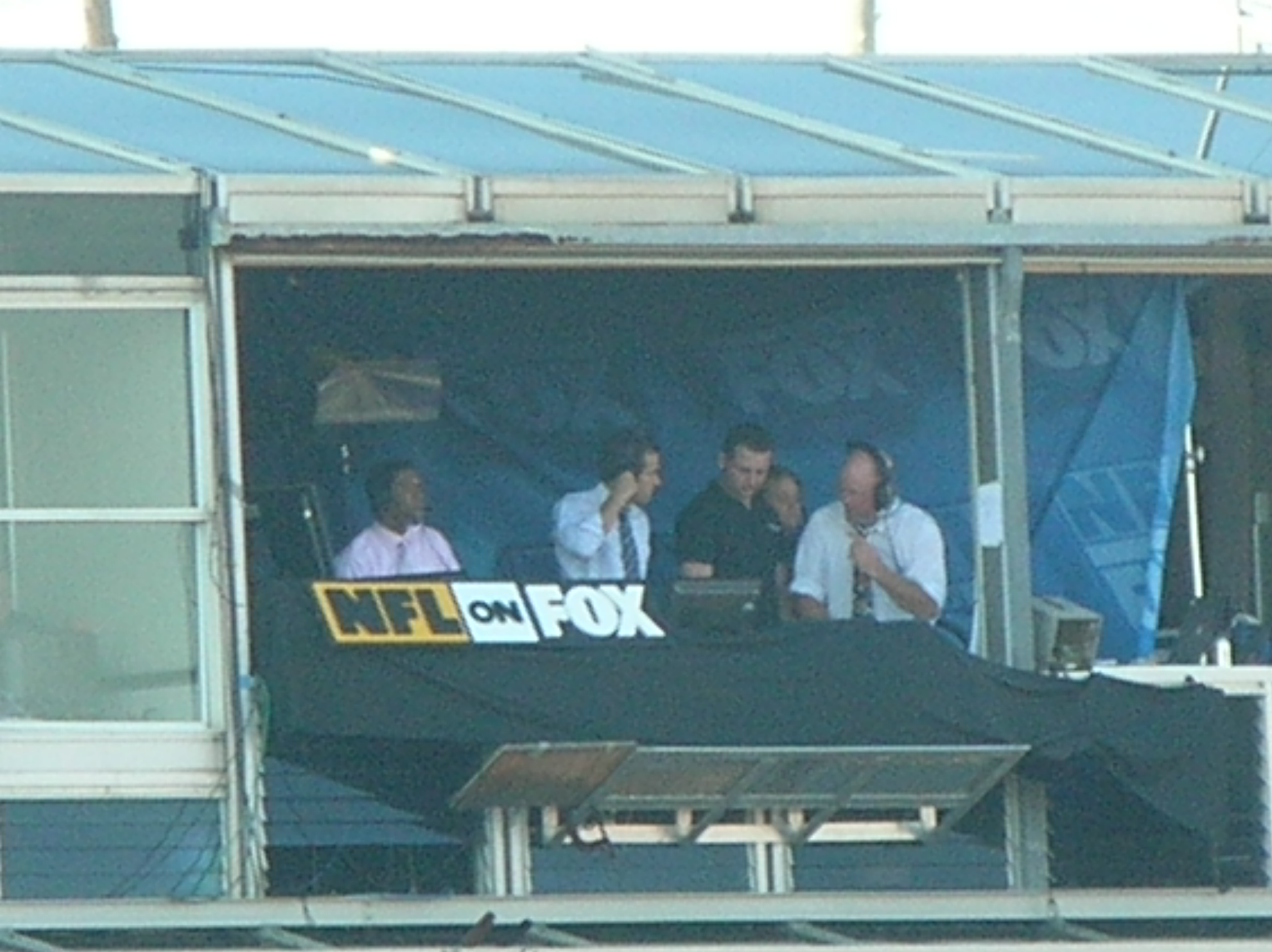
NFL on Fox announcers Matt Vasgersian and JC Pearson at Candlestick Park, November 16, 2008

This was the third season under the league's television contracts with its American broadcast partners. CBS Sports and Fox Sports televised Sunday afternoon AFC and NFC away games, respectively. For primetime games, NBC broadcast Sunday Night Football and ESPN airs Monday Night Football. The NFL Network's Run to the Playoffs also broadcast seven Thursday and one Saturday late season night games, although there were reportedly negotiations to move those games to ESPN Classic. This was also the last NFL season to be broadcast over the air in analog television in the United States; the digital television transition occurred in June 2009. Border stations in Canada and Mexico will continue to broadcast in analog; cable stations are unaffected and will be distributed in the format of the cable provider's choice.

Beginning with this season, all regular season games would now be televised in high-definition.

NBC broadcast Super Bowl XLIII, their first Super Bowl since Super Bowl XXXII at the end of the 1997 season.

==== Changes ====
ESPN reduced the on-air roles of sideline reporters Michele Tafoya and Suzy Kolber during the Monday Night Football telecast. Also, Emmitt Smith has been replaced on Sunday NFL Countdown by Cris Carter, who came over from HBO.

Meanwhile, NBC's Football Night in America reunited Dan Patrick with Keith Olbermann on television for the first time since 1997 when they co-hosted SportsCenter. At Fox NFL Sunday, former New York Giants defensive end Michael Strahan joined the show as an analyst.

The in-house NFL Network saw Bryant Gumbel resign as their play-by-play announcer after two seasons on the network's Run to the Playoffs package after critics described his play-by-play calling as "lackluster". New York Giants radio announcer Bob Papa took his place.

Additionally, NFL Films-produced Inside the NFL changed premium cable homes from Time Warner's HBO after three decades to CBS' Showtime. Also changed: James Brown (from the parent network's The NFL Today) as host and Phil Simms as one of the analysts. Cris Collinsworth is staying, but Dan Marino has been dropped as a studio analyst, and the aforementioned Cris Carter moved to ESPN. Taking their place is Warren Sapp.

==== 3-D Telecast ====
On December 4, the NFL Network broadcast its game between the Oakland Raiders and the San Diego Chargers to theaters in New York City, Boston and Los Angeles using state of the art 3-D technology. The viewings, which were limited to NFL and consumer electronics executives, served as a test for future use of 3D in NFL television games. Because of a technical glitch, the first half was not shown.

=== Radio ===
On radio, Westwood One separated from its longtime corporate sister, CBS Radio and the Sports USA Radio Network, another syndicator, has been sold along with parent company Jones Radio Networks to the Triton Media Group.. This led to the former "NFL on Westwood One" giving way in 2011 to "NFL on Dial Global".

=== Internet television ===
On Internet television, both NFL.com and NBCSports.com carried complete live games of NBC Sunday Night Football for the first time ever. NFL.com continued its live coverage of Thursday and Saturday Night Football, which began in 2007, however for the first time the complete game rather than live look-ins was shown.

=== Home video ===
The Pittsburgh Steelers 2008 season/Super Bowl XLIII championship home video went on sale on DVD on February 24, 2009. One week later on March 3, it was released on Blu-ray Disc, making it the first NFL Films home video release to be on Blu-ray Disc. The Blu-ray copy is "officially" sold exclusively through Amazon.com, though it is also available through the Sports Illustrated Super Bowl offer as well as eBay. Among its exclusive content included having most of the features in high-definition video as well as the NFL on Fox fourth-quarter coverage of the Steelers matchup against the Dallas Cowboys at Heinz Field in its entirety. The matchup, which took place during Week 14 and renewed the rivalry the two teams had in the 1970s & 1990s, saw the Steelers come back from a 4th quarter ten-point deficit to win 20–13.

The New York Giants 2007 season/Super Bowl video was only released on DVD the previous year despite the fact that Toshiba dropped support of HD DVD (the primary rival of Blu-ray) just two weeks after Super Bowl XLII.

== See also ==
- Super Bowl XLIII
- 2008 NFL draft
