= KSNA =

Radio station in Idaho Falls, Idaho

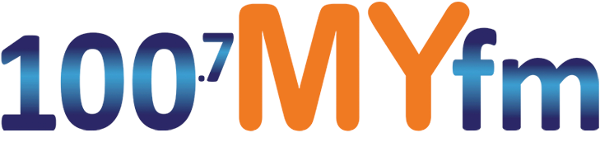
- Idaho Falls, Idaho; United States
- Broadcast area: Idaho Falls-Pocatello-Rexburg
- Frequency: 100.7 MHz (HD Radio)
- Branding: 100.7 My FM

Programming
- Format: Bright AC
- Affiliations: Jones Radio Networks Nu Skin BYU Sports Network

Ownership
- Owner: Sand Hill Media

History
- First air date: 1966 (as KGVM-FM at 99.1)
- Former call signs: KGVM-FM (1966–1975); KUPI-FM (1975–1979); KQPI-FM (1979–1988); KUPI-FM (1988–2011)
- Former frequencies: 99.1 MHz (1966–2011)

Technical information
- Licensing authority: FCC
- Facility ID: 55237
- Class: C1
- ERP: 100,000 watts
- HAAT: 193 meters
- Transmitter coordinates: 43°21′6″N 112°0′29″W
- Repeater: 100.7 KSNA-FM1 (Pocatello)

Links
- Public license information: Public file; LMS
- Webcast: Listen Live
- Website: 100myfm.com

KSNA (100.7 FM, "100.7 My FM") is a radio station broadcasting an Bright AC format. Licensed to Idaho Falls, Idaho, United States, the station is currently owned by Sand Hill Media and features programming from Jones Radio Networks.

== History ==
The current KSNA license began as KGVM-FM 99.1 in 1966. KGVM-FM was owned by Golden Valley FM, Inc., until 1975, when the Federal Communications Commission approved after two years of delays a sale to Idaho Broadcasters, Inc. The call letters were changed to KUPI-FM, which would hold for most of the next 36 years, except for between 1979 and 1988, when the station was KQPI-FM instead.

In 2011, a large frequency shuffle involving dozens of stations swept the Mountain West. The 94.3 license was moved to 99.1 FM, and the existing 99.1 license was moved to 100.7. To keep the KUPI-FM country programming on 99.1, KSNA was relocated from one license at 94.3 to the other at 100.7, and the two stations also switched call signs; at the same time, KSNA shifted from CHR to adult CHR.

As of 2025, KSNA also serves as the radio affiliate for BYU Football and Men's Basketball broadcasts from the Nu Skin BYU Sports Network for the East Idaho area.

== New and Current Logo for 100.7 ==
logo = KSNA "100.7 My FM" logo.png logo_size = 200px
