= Bright AC =

American music radio network

- Type: Radio network
- Country: United States
- Availability: National
- Owner: Dial Global Networks (through Triton Media Group)
- Launch date: Unknown at this time
- Official website: Bright AC website

Bright AC was a 24-hour music format produced by Dial Global. Its playlist was mostly hot adult contemporary music spanning from the 1980s to this day from artists such as 3 Doors Down, U2, Nickelback, Red Hot Chili Peppers, Kelly Clarkson, etc. that mainly targets female listeners ages 25–54.

Its competitors were "AC Active" by Waitt and "Hot AC" by Jones; however, those assets were absorbed by Triton Media Group, leaving ABC Radio's "Today's Best Hits" the only competitor. It was relocated into the "Hot AC" format on December 29, 2008.
