= Good Time Oldies =

US radio format

- Type: Radio network
- Country: United States
- Availability: National
- Owner: Westwood One
- Launch date: 1990
- Former names: Goldies
- Official website: Good Time Oldies website

Good Time Oldies is a 24-hour music format offered to local radio stations across the country that was originally produced by Jones Radio Networks. After the sales of Jones Radio Networks to Dial Global in 2008, the format was absorbed into D.G.`s "Kool Oldies" format. However, due to radio stations demand, the Good Time Oldies format was brought to Dial Global. The format was programmed by program director Jon Holiday from 1994 through 2003.

Good Time Oldies targets a key demographic of white men age 50 to 64. The majority of the network's playlist is from the 1960s and 70s with scattered tunes from the 50s and 80s.

Jones Radio Networks was purchased by Triton Media Group, and "Good Time Oldies" was merged to Dial Global's "Kool Gold" network and then quickly brought back as Good Time Oldies due to affiliate demand. It is also available through the Dial Global "local" division as well.

Dial Global's satellite-delivered Kool Gold program eventually evolved into Westwood One's "Classic Hits Total" format, after the two companies merged.

D.J.s on the Jones Radio Networks Good Time Oldies feed included Jay "The Fox That Rocks" Fox, Gary Outlaw and Dave Michaels' "Dave's Diner" which first aired on the G.T.O. feed in 1992. Fox and Michaels remained with the format during its eventual change into Westwood One's "Classic Hits" format.

In spring 2014, Westwood One (which merged with Dial Global in 2012) announced that a network branded as Good Time Oldies would replace The True Oldies Channel beginning in June. (Cumulus lost the rights to the True Oldies Channel after its host, founder and owner, Scott Shannon, left the company in February, taking the format with him a few months later.) Good Time Oldies was restocked primarily with talent from Cumulus's "Classic Hits Format", including Maria Danza and "Smokin" Kevan Browning. Good Time Oldies is the 1st joint format venture between Cumulus and its latest acquisition, Westwood One. Its flagship station as the HD2 subchannel of KRBE in Houston, Texas.

On March 20, 2025, Westwood One announced that the format would be discontinued one month later (on April 20), along with their Variety Hits Pop, Variety Hits Rock, Hits Now, Classic Hits Gold, Classic Rock X and Rock 2.0 formats.

At 11:59:50 on April 20, 2025, the satellite feed of Good Time Oldies went silent. The final song heard on the format was the Bee Gees version of More Than a Woman, and the final personality heard was Steve "Stu" Stuart.

Some of the final stations to air the format included:

KSEO (switched to Westwood One's "Classic Hits - Rock" format)

WTBO (switched to Local Radio Networks' "Super Hits," another syndicated oldies format. Dennis Harrington is one of the hosts on this format, and was ironically part of the original Jones Radio Networks' Good Time Oldies format in the mid-2000s.)

WWIZ (switched to Westwood One's Adult Contemporary format ahead of the change)

WEGG (airs a locally based oldies format, and continues to use branding and liners from Good Time Oldies)
