= AC Active =

Syndicated radio format

- Type: Radio network
- Country: United States

Programming
- Format: Hot adult contemporary

Ownership
- Owner: Dial Global, through Triton Media Group

Coverage
- Availability: National

Links
- Website: AC Active website

AC Active was a United States 24-hour music format produced by Dial Global Local (formerly Waitt Radio Networks). Its playlist was composed of hot adult contemporary music released from the 1980s to when it stopped broadcasting from artists such as Phil Collins, Maroon 5, Matchbox Twenty, Green Day, KT Tunstall, etc. that mainly targeted listeners ages 25–44.

In June 2012, due to reorganizations at Dial Global, the Dial Global Local 24/7 formats were fully integrated into Dial Global's portfolio of formats, and "Dial Global Local" ceased to exist as a brand name. However, most of the former Dial Global Local formats were still offered to affiliate stations in the same manner in which they were previously offered. AC Active continued as a Local version of Dial Global's Hot AC format. By 2020, it was no more, as it was discontinued.

== Competitor Networks ==
- Today's Best Hits by ABC Radio Networks
