= S.A.M.: Simply About Music =

- Type: Radio network
- Country: United States
- Availability: National
- Owner: Dial Global Networks (through Triton Media Group)
- Launch date: 2005
- Dissolved: 2015

S.A.M.: Simply About Music (pronounced "Sam") was a 24-hour satellite-driven format produced by Westwood One, based on the adult hits format. Its playlist consisted of a wide variety of popular adult music from the 1960s through today, from artists ranging from Led Zeppelin to Lady Gaga to Linkin Park.

The format's name, other than the acronym, derives from other "Male First Name FM" formats such as Jack FM, Bob FM and Hank FM. The network was founded by the original Westwood One in 2005 in response to the rapid rise in popularity of such formats. S.A.M. has absorbed Jones Variety Hits upon acquisition of Jones Radio Networks by Triton Media Group's Dial Global division (now the modern Westwood One) effective September 30, 2008.

The modern Westwood One, now a subsidiary of Cumulus Media, shut down S.A.M. on August 31, 2015 to avoid duplication with its ownership of the Jack FM national rights. Four years later, the network lost the rights to Jack FM to Skyview Networks and relaunched two variety hits networks: Variety Hits Pop and Variety Hits Rock (the latter of which has a classic rock lean).
