= Classic Rock (Dial Global radio network) =

- Type: Radio network
- Country: United States
- Availability: National
- Owner: Dial Global (through Triton Media Group)
- Launch date: July 1997
- Former names: Rock Classics

Classic Rock (formerly Rock Classics) was a 24-hour music format produced by Dial Global Networks. Its playlist consists mostly of contemporary classic rock music from artists such as Led Zeppelin, Pink Floyd, Lynyrd Skynyrd and Van Halen, The Rolling Stones. The format was launched in July 1997 by Jones Senior Director of Programming Jon Holiday and has been programmed by Adam Fendrich since 2001.

Although "Rock Classics" wasn't affected by the recent purchased of Jones Radio Networks by Triton Media Group, it was relocated into Dial Global's portfolio and re-branded as "Classic Rock" on December 29, 2008. However, Dial Global's "Adult Rock and Roll" was dissolved to make this happen.

== Competitor Networks ==
- The Classic Rock Experience by Citadel Media
