= Classic Hits/Pop =

Syndicated radio format

Classic Hits
- Type: Radio network
- Country: United States
- Availability: National
- Owner: Dial Global Networks (through Triton Media Group)
- Launch date: February 12, 2010
- Former names: Kool Gold, The Oldies Channel, Kool Gold Timeless Classics
- Official website: Classic Hits website

Classic Hits (known as Kool Gold until June 17, 2012) is a 24-hour music format produced by Westwood One. Its playlist is composed of oldies music from the mid-1960s to mid-1980s, from artists such as Billy Joel, The Beatles, The Temptations, Fleetwood Mac, Hall and Oates and dozens more artists mainly targeted at listeners 45–54. It was known as The Oldies Channel until they changed their name to "Kool Gold" to avoid confusion with the ABC Radio/Citadel Media "The True Oldies Channel". It was branded as Kool Gold Timeless Classics as part of Dial Global's revamped satellite format group, but has then reverted to its original Kool Gold ident to avoid confusion with Citadel's former Timeless format, which once used the "Timeless Classics" positioner.

Its competitors were "Oldies Plus" by Waitt, Classic Hits and Good Time Oldies by Jones; however, those assets were absorbed by Triton Media Group, leaving ABC Radio/Citadel Media's Classic Hits and The True Oldies Channel the only competitors. Prior to early 2009, the network has now consolidated Jones' "Good Time Oldies" into this satellite feed. The former "Oldies Plus" format was subsequently absorbed into Dial Global's portfolio and now is offered by Dial Global as a locally customized version of the Classic Hits/Pop format.

Kool Gold was originally a 1950s and 1960s oldies format produced by Jim Seemiller of Adams Broadcasting and syndicated nationally by Satellite Music Network (later by ABC Radio Networks). The programming was produced in Phoenix, AZ beginning in the late 1980s and ending in about 1996. The format concentrated entirely on the first decade of rock & roll and featured a large playlist of more than 1,500 songs. In its heyday, the syndicated programming was broadcast by 50+ affiliate stations. The Kool in the title was borrowed from the call letters of the format's flagship station, KOOL (AM) -- now KKNT, 960 kHz—in Phoenix, Arizona. KOOL GOLD was first radio station to syndicate itself 24 hours a day, and created a brand that now is used by more than 50 radio stations in US. In conjunction with KOOL-FM, the stations were nominated for 4 Marconi Awards and won in 1991/92 as best Oldies stations, under the tutelage of Jim Seemiller

Stations that once aired the original Kool Gold Format:

- KOOL (AM) 960 (Phoenix, AZ)
- KCBQ (AM) 1170 (San Diego, CA)
- WQAM AM 560 (Miami, FL)
- KLUP 930 (San Antonio, TX)
- WHND 560 AM (Detroit, MI - carried the format in its last several months as an oldies station prior to switching to a Spanish format in 1994)
