= Jones Radio Networks =

American radio syndication network (1969–2009)

- Type: Private
- Industry: Radio
- Founded: 1969 for Jones International
- Defunct: 2009
- Fate: Absorbed by Dial Global as a result of being purchased by Triton Media Group
- Headquarters: Centennial, Colorado
- Key people: Glenn R. Jones
- Products: Radio Services
- Owner: Triton Digital

Jones Radio Networks & Jones Media Group were branches of Jones International before being sold to Triton Media Group. JRN and JMN provide local radio stations with satellite-delivered formats. They also offer other services to local radio such as news and talk programs, syndicated radio shows, music scheduling, show preparation, and music and sales Research. Jones Media Network also owns many national syndication shows such as Lia, All Night with Danny Wright, The Ed Schultz Show, The Stephanie Miller Show, The Bill Press Show, The Neal Boortz Show, The Clark Howard Show, and A&E Network's Live by Request. Jones Media Networks & Jones Radio Networks own production studios in: New York, NY; Los Angeles; Chicago; Washington, DC; Seattle, WA; Centennial, CO; and Florida. Clark Howard and Neal Boortz are broadcast from the studios of WSB-AM in Atlanta, GA; those shows are produced by Cox Radio. Jones Media Networks reaches about 1.3 billion weekly listeners in radio. In 2006, Jones purchased TM Century, a Dallas-based company providing jingles and production services for radio stations across the country.

== History ==
What became known as Jones Radio Networks started as a satellite format provider. The company originally started in the late 1960s as Drake-Chenault radio programming services. The company's services included music delivered on reel-to-reel tape, program consultation services, and station promotion. After acquiring TM Programming in 1986 (the 24/7 Format business owned by TM Communications in Dallas), the company made its first foray into satellite programming in April 1989 by launching five different full-time satellite-delivered formats under the name Drake-Chenault/Jones Satellite Services, a 50/50 partnership between Drake-Chenault and Jones International. In 1991 Jones acquired Drake-Chenault's interest in the partnership, and renamed it Jones Satellite Services. The remainder of the Drake-Chenault business was acquired by Seattle-based Broadcast Programming—which was later (below) acquired by Jones.

Though satellite-delivered formats were not new, its presentation was. Many stations using satellite formats were required to clear up to two minutes of network commercials as part of their affiliation agreement, on top of a monthly subscription fee, depending on the market's size. Drake-Chenault's formats were all commercial free, but the affiliate station paid more for the service rather than giving up commercial time. For example, while another network would charge inventory plus a $500 monthly subscription fee, a Jones affiliate could expect to pay just a flat fee of $2,000 a month. While that was substantially higher, it was still cheaper than paying a contingency of on-site announcers at the local stations, plus freed up big-ticket national advertisers to be sought locally by an affiliate station.

This practice ended in 1993, to mixed reactions from affiliate stations. Though affiliates now had to clear commercials like other networks, the format was available entirely through inventory barter, unlike its competitors, which required an affiliation fee plus inventory.

In 1996, Jones Media Networks started the cable network GAC (Great American Country). Up against stiff competition from CMT, GAC failed to capture market share and was later sold to The E.W. Scripps Company, owners of Home & Garden Television and Food Network. Earlier the company had launched the cable network Mind Extension University, which mainly featured adult education programs, and later shifted to a technology focus as Knowledge TV before it was discontinued around 2000. Jones Computer Network was offered as a 12-hour channel in 1994. The channel featured in-house productions as well as programming from syndicated CNET TV and Turner Broadcasting. JCN was sold to Vulcan Ventures to eventually create channel space on cable for their network, TechTV precursor Ziff-Davis Television, which removed the Jones Media Networks produced shows and added content from Ziff-Davis' magazine staff, including John C. Dvorak.

In 1998, Jones acquired its advertising sales representative, New York-based MediaAmerica from its founders, Gary Schonfeld and Ron Hartenbaum, who continued with Jones as executives. Schonfeld as President of Jones MediaAmerica and Hartenbaum as President of Jones Radio Networks.

In 1999, Jones International acquired and absorbed Broadcast Programming, a company that handled syndicated radio shows, including the popular evening program Delilah. Delilah left Jones to join Premiere Radio Networks, a division of Clear Channel, in 2004.

In 2002, Jones Radio Networks entered into a deal with the Sports USA Radio Network to distribute nationally syndicated sports programming, primarily National Football League games.

In 2008, Jones Radio Networks ceased operations after all of their radio programs and remaining satellite formats were acquired by Triton Media Group's Dial Global.

== Satellite formats ==
Jones Radio Networks, the largest independent radio network, provided many programming options for local radio stations. The company provided many satellite-driven formats to affiliate stations, mostly in small & mid-size markets and on major market HD Radio subchannels, however they can also be used on some major market stations as alternate or permanent programming. They could operate their stations virtually unmanned with nothing more than a computer and a satellite hookup. The "clock" included options for a 2-, 3-, or 5-minute newscasts at the top of the hour, followed by other holes for local spots. While the programming was live, DJs had to avoid references to the weather or anything else that would not be appropriate in many time zones. An 800-line was eventually added, allowing the live DJs to take phoned in requests.

On June 20, 2008, Triton Radio Networks, a wholly owned subsidiary of Triton Media Group, announced the acquisition of Jones Media Group and its operating companies, Jones Media America, Jones Radio Networks and JonesTM from Jones International Ltd. Only two months prior, Triton had acquired two of Jones's three main competitors, Dial Global and Waitt Radio Networks (only Citadel Media remains not under the Triton banner). JonesTM (now renamed TM STUDIOS), a leading provider of music libraries, imaging products and jingles, will remain a separate reporting unit. As the end result, the satellite format division was integrated into the "Dial Global Total" division of Dial Global as of January 6, 2009. The Jones Formats contributed the majority of the affiliate stations under contract. Formats included:

Network	Format	Fate of network
Adult Contemporary	Adult Contemporary	Relocated into Dial Global's portfolio on December 29, 2008.
CD Country	New Country	Discontinued on December 29, 2008. Integrated into "Hot Country".
Classic Hits	Oldies/Classic Hits	Discontinued on December 29, 2008. Integrated into "Kool Gold Timeless Classics".
Classic Hit Country	Classic Country	Relocated into Dial Global's portfolio on December 29, 2008.
Good Time Oldies	Oldies	Discontinued on December 29, 2008. Integrated into "Kool Gold Timeless Classics".
Hot AC	Hot AC	Moved to Dial Global's portfolio on December 29, 2008, replacing "Bright AC".
Jones Standards	Adult Standards	Discontinued on September 30, 2008. Integrated into "America's Best Music".
Jones Variety Hits	Variety/Adult Hits	Discontinued on September 30, 2008. Integrated into "S.A.M.: Simply About Music".
Music Of Your Life	Adult Standards	Spun off to Planet Halo in favor of its own short-lived standards format.
Rock Classics	Classic Rock	Relocated into Dial Global's portfolio on December 29, 2008 and rebranded as "Classic Rock", replacing "Adult Rock and Roll".
Smooth Jazz	Smooth Jazz	Discontinued on September 30, 2008.
Sports USA Radio Network	Sports	Active during live NFL and NCAA games. Relocated into Dial Global's portfolio.
True 24-Hour Country	Country	Relocated into Dial Global's portfolio on December 29, 2008.
U.S. Country	American Country	Discontinued on December 29, 2008. Integrated into "Mainstream Country".

== TM Studios, Inc. (formerly JonesTM, Inc.) ==
TM Studios, Inc. is a radio jingle and promotional music service company based in Dallas, Texas (USA). It is currently the oldest radio jingle company still in business, with roots tracing back to 1955 when Tom Merriman (the original "TM" in TM Studios) founded Commercial Recording Corporation (which closed in 1968). Tom Merriman left CRC in 1967 and founded TM Productions (later known as TM Communications, Inc. - a publicly traded company) with Jim Long. By this time, Century 21 Productions (later known as Century 21 Programming, Inc.), another Dallas jingle company, was founded.

Both jingle companies remained in business until 1990, when TM Communications, Inc. and Century 21 Programming, Inc. merged to become TM Century, Inc.

Along the way, TM Productions acquired the ID jingle, syndication reels and production libraries of Media General Broadcast Services. Media General was the purchaser of the former William B. Tanner Company (also formerly known as "Pepper & Tanner" and before that, "Pepper Sound Studios"). Even though all of the reference reels for the syndicated ID Jingles and customized production libraries and commercials were dumpstered in Memphis before the shutdown of MG's operations there, the master backing tracks and sound libraries were boxed up and shipped to Dallas, where TM Studios has placed these reels in the custody of the Media Preservation Foundation, although the copyrights are retained by their previous owners. Afterward, the production libraries were cherry-picked and newly incorporated into various TM Studios libraries which are still sold to this day.

Other entities and audio assets incorporated into TM and Century 21 over the years included the audio works of Eastman Radio (founded by Robert Eastman), Ed Yelin, Ken Sunderland Productions, Sterling Sound and several other companies. Again, these assets were cherry-picked (or in some cases, just pulled out of the marketplace) and the master reels shelved.

Studio Dragonfly, a division of TM Studios, offers radio station jingles at low prices. Several of the jingles offered by Studio Dragonfly were previously produced by TM Productions, Century 21 and many others. TM Studios also has another division that exclusively handles commercial jingles known as JingleBank. In order to facilitate ID jingle enthusiasts the ability to purchase "personal cuts" TM Studios initiated a program called iJingles in 2006.

Over the years jingle composers such as Bruce Upchurch, Bruce Wermuth, Greg Clancy and Barry Young have composed jingle packages for TM Studios and its predecessors. Tom Merriman who composed several jingle packages for the company, most recently KLUV's Greatest Hits in 2005, died on November 11, 2009.

Of all the radio stations using jingles from TM Studios and its predecessors, WPLJ in New York City has ordered more jingle packages to date: seven so far since 1991. JonesTM, a wholly owned division of Jones Media Group, acquired the company in September 2006 by buying out the then-current shareholders. JonesTM was acquired itself on June 20, 2008 by Triton Radio Networks and thereafter renamed TM Studios, Inc.

TM Studios produces a line of promotional music products targeted for radio stations, internet stations and professional DJs. Two lines are currently produced: HitDisc and PrimeCuts. HitDisc is aimed at radio stations. PrimeCuts mostly services the event entertainment market.

In Indonesia, TM Studios produces many jingles from Radio Stations such as :

- CPP Radionet (JPI, Candisewu, Damashinta, SAS FM, Polaris, RCT FM, etc)
- EBS FM Surabaya
- Gajahmada Group
- KISS FM Medan
- Unisi Radio
- Many radio stations in Bandung

etc.
