= WEGG =

Radio station in Royston, Georgia

- Royston, Georgia; United States
- Frequency: 95.3 MHz
- Branding: Good Time Oldies 95.3 WEGG

Programming
- Format: Oldies

Ownership
- Owner: Georgia-Carolina Radiocasting Companies; (Lake Hartwell Radio, Inc.)
- Sister stations: WLHR-FM

History
- First air date: 2009
- Former call signs: WYPJ (2009–2021)

Technical information
- Licensing authority: FCC
- Facility ID: 166080
- Class: A
- ERP: 3,300 watts
- HAAT: 137 meters (449 ft)
- Transmitter coordinates: 34°15′01″N 83°07′24″W

Links
- Public license information: Public file; LMS
- Webcast: Listen live
- Website: 953wegg.com

WEGG (95.3 FM) is a radio station broadcasting an oldies format that is licensed to Royston, Georgia, United States. The station is owned by Georgia-Carolina Radiocasting Companies under licensee Lake Hartwell Radio, Inc.

From its beginning in 2009 to 2021 WYPJ was licensed to Due West, South Carolina, serving the Anderson, South Carolina area with a format of Today's R&B music and Urban Oldies.

On May 31, 2020, WYPJ was sold by RFPJY, LLC to Lake Hartwell Radio, LLC, and went off the air. The sale of the station was consummated on January 19, 2021, and the call sign was changed from WYPJ to WEGG on January 21, 2021.

Following the sale to Lake Hartwell Radio the station's community of license was moved to Bowman, Georgia on May 25, 2021, and then to Royston, Georgia on February 20, 2026. The move from Bowman to Royston made no changes to the station's licensed facility or tower location but resulted in a priority 4 allotment improvement by providing a 2nd local and first full-time service to the substantially larger community of Royston.

On August 3, 2022, WEGG launched an oldies format branded as "95.3 WEGG Good Time Oldies", carrying programming from Westwood One's Good Time Oldies network.

On April 17, 2025, after receiving word that Westwood One would discontinue the Good Time Oldies format, WEGG took the oldies format in-house.

WEGG also carries four specialty shows

Street Corner Symphony with host Stompin' Zemo (Doo Wop Music) - Saturdays from 7:00 a.m. until 10:00 a.m.

Pat Gwinn At The Beach with host Pat Gwinn (Carolina Beach Music) -Saturdays from 10:00 a.m. until 12:00 p.m.

Yacht Rock Radio with host Captain Adam (light rock hits of the 70's and early 80's) Saturdays from 12:00 p.m. until 2:00 p.m.

Nothing But Old 45's with host Larry Kratka (songs from the 60's & 70's played on actual 45 rpm records including many lost 45's) Sundays from 7:00 p.m. to 8:00 p.m.
