= Tom Merriman (composer) =

- Born: 20 March 1924; Chicago, Illinois, United States
- Died: 11 November 2009 (aged 85) Dallas, Texas, United States
- Genres: Jingles
- Occupation: Composer

Thomas Wayne Merriman (20 March 1924 – 11 November 2009) was an American music composer based in Dallas, Texas, who in 1955 created the first production company specializing in radio station advertising campaigns and jingles. Merriman led the Liberty Network Band, and arranged and/or produced music for Louis Armstrong, Duke Ellington and Cab Calloway.

== Career ==
Merriman wrote and recorded the first ever radio jingle recorded in Dallas for KLIF. He also wrote countless commercials that are still recognizable and remembered today, corporate musical shows, Las Vegas shows, and theme park ride music, he also recorded the voice on his classic, "I’m Otto, the Orkin Man."

He was one of the original owners of KVIL, a major FM radio station serving the Dallas–Fort Worth metroplex.

He was a graduate of Indiana University, renowned for its music school, Merriman was a student of the Juilliard School of Music and established his musical credentials with an impressive list of clients. Over the years, he wrote and produced music for Louis Armstrong, Duke Ellington, and Cab Calloway, as well as corporate and film clients — winning a Cannes Film Festival Award and an award from the Academy of Motion Picture Arts and Sciences. Among his musical works, Merriman’s arranged a hit for Louis Armstrong's, "Do You Know What It Means to Miss New Orleans?."

Over the years, Merriman mentored young musicians and writers, some of whom followed in his jingle/radio ID footsteps, such as local singer/composer, Chris Kershaw (b. May 24, 1949; d. April 28, 2013), whom he took under his wing when he was a teenager at St. Mark's School in Dallas; and jazz composer/producer, Phil Kelly, now living in Bellingham, Washington, who says that "working with Tom over a period of thirty plus years was always [like] continuing post-graduate instruction in how to write all kinds of commercial music. I'm definitely a far better writer, directly due to watching, listening, learning and, often... stealing from him."

=== TM Studios ===
Before partnering with Jim Long in 1967 to create one of the nation’s most influential commercial jingle and radio ID production companies, TM Productions (now TM Studios), Merriman was a staff writer for various production houses, an independent producer, the owner of CRC (Commercial Recording Corporation), where he wrote and recorded a custom jingle for the Dallas Morning News: "Start the day with the world on your doorstep, with the Dallas Morning News."

All the while, he kept his "day job" as the music director at the Hockaday School — until the success of the TM Companies far exceeded his wildest dreams. Even with success and a busy schedule, he still found time to serve as an orchestral arranger for his friend, Jim Clancy, who founded the now internationally recognized vocal performance group, The Vocal Majority.

The TM Companies grew to include not only radio IDs and commercial jingles, but also radio programming, automated radio formats, and music libraries (TM Programming) which surpassed anything else in the marketplace. Tom Parma, who was hired as an engineer at TM Productions – and was soon moved into sales by Long, describes the 1960s, and 1970s at TM as a "shining, golden time" of creativity, success and a "wonderful place to work." Tom Parma's wife, Judy, was a radio ID jingle singer at TM Studios.

Merriman continued to support countless young musicians by hiring recent graduates of the newly formed (at that time) One O'Clock Lab Band — and by creating an internship program at TM which fostered the production talents of then Indiana University student, Linda Adelkoff LeGrand, who became a top-level recording engineer and vocal producer. LeGrand recalls of her experience at TM, "I was 21 years old when I came to work at TM Productions as a recording engineer intern ... I was awestruck by his talent and musical knowledge. What a character! Tom Merriman was a genius in an unlikely package."

Music industry experts acknowledge that TM was the biggest and best of its kind in the world, winning awards and shaping the sound of commercial recording for over 40 years, evolving thru’ changes in ownership and management, including its sale to Disney's Shamrock Broadcasting and current incarnation as TM Studios, under the former leadership of David Graupner.

==== "Dance the Slurp" ====
40 years after Merriman wrote "Dance the Slurp", which was released as a vinyl 45 to promote 7-Eleven's Slurpee drinks in the late 1960s, it increased in popularity among DJs. San Francisco Bay area DJs Cut Chemist and Shadow, featured Merriman's song as the centerpiece of their "BrainFreeze" mix CD. Because of legal problems with 7-Eleven, the "BrainFreeze" funk mix has gone underground, selling for up to $100 and a single copy of the original 45 "Dance the Slurp" is considered a bargain at $35.

== Death ==
Merriman suffered a fall and his health declined over several months. Merriman died November 11, 2009, in Dallas, Texas.

== Historical collections ==
The majority of Mr. Merriman's personal recordings collection is housed with Media Preservation Foundation in Springfield, Massachusetts.
