= Jim Long (businessman) =

American entrepreneur (1943–2022)

- Born: Timothy John Moynihan; February 7, 1943; Worcester, Massachusetts, U.S.
- Died: May 30, 2022 (aged 79)
- Genre: multiple
- Occupations: Music production, master recordings, music publishing, broadcast licensing
- Years active: 1961–2022

Jim Long (born Timothy John Moynihan; February 7, 1943 – May 30, 2022) was an American entrepreneur, who worked in the broadcast music industry.

Experienced in the development of intellectual properties, his business holdings focused on music production, master recordings, music publishing, and broadcast licensing and syndication for the radio, television and film industries. He founded/co-founded numerous broadcast and radio syndication companies, including Dallas-based TM Productions/Starr Broadcasting, FirstCom/Jim Long Music, Long-Pride Broadcasting, and a Nashville-based music and publishing group, OneMusic. At various times, he also held ownership interest in 19 radio and TV stations throughout the U.S. His record label, Honest Entertainment, produced Grammy-nominated albums.

== Biography ==
=== Early years ===
Long (who took his maternal grandfather's name when he began his career as a radio announcer) was the only child of John Francis Moynihan and Marion Long Moynihan, whose families came to New England from County Kerry and Mallow, County Cork, Ireland in the 1800s. Always in some form of law enforcement, Long's father retired as a United States Air Force major (provost marshal in Germany) and corrections officer for the State of Massachusetts. His mother was a registered nurse and homemaker.

Fascinated by radio since childhood, Long built his first vacuum tube radio transmitter at the age of 13 and started his own radio station in his basement in Marlborough, Massachusetts. It was a successful enterprise until the Federal Communications Commission (FCC) showed up to confiscate his transmitter. It was interfering with a local radio station's signal. (Long later went to work for the station, WMRC, Milford, Massachusetts). At 15, he produced his first record, "Liza Lee" by Roger and The Markees, and started his own record company, Dell Mont Recording, to release it (also in his basement, using his savings and a $200 loan from his mother). This gave him his first taste of artist promotion, record production, and distribution, especially “returns”. After high school, Long worked at Walgreens Drug Stores, while taking courses in broadcasting, to fulfill his goal of becoming a D.J./radio announcer.

He joined the United States Navy and was stationed at Anacostia Naval Base in Washington, D.C., where he served in the elite U. S. Navy Ceremonial Guard, with duty at Arlington National Cemetery. Honorably discharged, he returned to civilian life to pursue a career in broadcasting, where he put his talents as a writer and producer to work.

Long died on May 30, 2022, at the age of 79.

=== Notable firsts ===
Jim Long was the first to:

- Introduce the use of CDs in the U.S. as format for music production libraries;
- Introduce and market comprehensive multi-media image campaigns for radio stations, complete with station IDs, print and broadcast advertising, promotional materials, and market research programs. Such as, “Someplace Special”, “Rhythm of the City”, the “You” campaign;
- Create a major special for album oriented rock station programming, “Album Greats”, a 48-hour history of album rock.;
- Successfully automate rock programming;
- Introduce a cappella and shotgun vocal formats for station IDs;
- Introduce commercial services and music production libraries for radio stations to sell their local advertisers.;
- Introduce station ID image songs – station identification jingles of more than:60 seconds that sounded like the hits songs that the stations played, in 1972–1973. Later known in the industry as the “mini-song” station ID – a widely imitated concept; and
- Introduce the “Turn on the Light” radio format in Washington, D.C.

== Radio career ==
Beginning in 1961, Long worked as an announcer, producer and program manager at radio stations in Keene (WKBK), Dover (WTSN) and Manchester (WFEA), NH; Westfield (WDEW) and Southbridge (WESO), Massachusetts; Waterbury, Connecticut (WWCO); Springfield, Vermont (WCFR); Bangor, Maine (WGUY); Messina (WSTS), Malone (WICY), Utica (WRUN) and Syracuse (WOLF) New York; Orlando, Florida (WKIS); and Indianapolis (WIBC), Indiana.

In early 1967, after a year as Program Director of WIBC/Indianapolis, the 24-year-old Long was given the opportunity to move to Texas by composer Tom Merriman who was working at Dallas-based Commercial Recording Corporation (CRC). Within six months, he and Merriman would launch TM Productions, Inc. with $10,000 capital.

== Companies ==
=== The TM Companies (1967–1979) ===
In 1967 TM Productions began as a music production company, producing commercial jingles and broadcast station identifications (IDs). Long conceptualized and co-produced an entirely new approach to station IDs which provided stations a natural flow from commercial breaks to station IDs to music programming, increasing listenership and ratings. Called “Phase 2”, “The Propellants” and “The Winning Score”, these programs were quickly adopted by top stations including KILT Houston, WCFL Chicago and KHJ Los Angeles. He also created IDs that sounded like the hit songs the stations were playing (e.g., “And the Beat Goes On” and “Charisma” for WCFL Chicago and KLIF Dallas). These concepts were extremely successful and soon widely imitated within the industry.

TM Productions was the first production-syndication company to create and market comprehensive multi-media image campaigns for radio stations, complete with station IDs, print and broadcast advertising, promotional materials, and market research programs. (“Someplace Special”, “Rhythm of the City”, “You”, “Where You Belong” and “Where Your Friends Are”) These image campaigns increased ratings at stations like WCOL Columbus, KRFC San Francisco, KHJ Los Angeles, and WIBG in Philadelphia. These award-winning campaigns could be syndicated for use in non-competing markets.

A similar format image campaign was also developed for television stations, with WLKY-TV in Lexington, Kentucky, serving as the pilot. Called ColorTheme, it incorporated animation and music for station IDs and was customized for many major market TV stations, including the MetroMedia Group, Inc.

Long also introduced commercial services libraries – full service, multi-media advertising campaigns designed for local advertisers by award-winning composers and writer-producers. For the first time, radio stations could provide high quality advertising campaigns to their advertising sponsor clients. The Producer (1973) and MasterPlan (1976) were licensed to over 2000 radio stations, worldwide, and generated millions of dollars in additional revenue for local radio broadcasters.

The scope of the business included three additional product divisions:

TM Programming, a full service radio programming firm, created and produced customized services for over 500 radio stations throughout the U.S., including market analysis, and music programming in four different musical formats: Beautiful music, stereo rock, soft rock, and country. It was the first to successfully automate mainstream rock programming (WGY-FM in Albany, New York) and the first syndicator to successfully program country music on FM radio (WSOC-FM, Charlotte, North Carolina).

TM Special Projects produced music “specials” for broadcast, including the first-ever 48-hour history of album rock, Album Greats, which was aired by hundreds of top progressive rock radio stations, upon its release in 1977.

TM International provided worldwide distribution of the products of the TM Companies.

By the early 1970s, the TM Companies had become internationally recognized as the radio industry's leading provider of music libraries and programming. When Long left to found FirstCom in 1980, he had accumulated industry and broadcast awards, including nine Clio awards. He had built the largest and most successful broadcast syndicator of its kind in the world.

=== Starr Broadcasting and William F. Buckley (1973–1979) ===
The success of the TM Companies brought suitors and, on October 15, 1973, Long and Tom Merriman sold TM to Starr Broadcasting Group, a broadcast oriented, publicly held corporation whose primary shareholder and chairman of the board was William F. Buckley. Long and Merriman (who both became multi-millionaires in the deal) continued in their roles with TM, but sought to buy back the company in 1976 when the U.S. Securities and Exchange Commission (SEC) began an investigation into Buckley's business affairs, accusing him and several members of the Starr Broadcasting board of directors of fraud and misuse of shareholder's funds. On July 17, 1979, Starr Broadcasting Group, along with its 13 radio and television stations and the TM Companies, was merged with Shamrock Broadcasting Corporation, a privately held Los Angeles company controlled by the Roy E. Disney family.

=== FirstCom Broadcast Services (1980–1995), a division of Jim Long Companies, Inc. ===
Long founded FirstCom in 1980 to provide broadcasters with a new level of promotion, music production services, and high-end creative ideas, using emerging technologies. He called his new commercial services library “The Creative Department” and was considered a pioneer in his use of market research to develop audience share and increase profitability – resulting in a series of syndicated promotions, sales training programs (Sales Performance System), and high quality music production libraries, unsurpassed in the industry, at that time.

In 1984, Long introduced the first ever compact disc (CD) production music library, Digital Production Library. This production format soon became the industry standard (instead of vinyl). By this time, FirstCom had become one of the largest stock music library companies worldwide. Long had reinvented the company to look beyond radio at the broader arena of domestic and international copyrights/music publishing, exploring audio-visual and digital technologies not yet widely used by business. He also expanded FirstCom's marketing to include sales to television and film music clients, a concept he later expanded upon when he created OneMusic and Crucial Music Corporations.

In 1992, FirstCom was the first company to put their entire music catalog online and to offer an online music delivery system, called MusiQuick so that clients had immediate access to their production tools on the internet.

Long sold FirstCom and the Jim Long Companies, Inc. in 1990 to Clive Calder’s Zomba Enterprises/Jive Records of London. He continued as chairman and on-going consultant until 1995. FirstCom is now owned by Universal Music Group.

=== Long-Pride Broadcasting Group, Inc. (1980–1987) ===
In 1980, Long formed Long-Pride Broadcasting with friend and business associate, country singer Charley Pride. They shared ownership in several real estate ventures, a Texas bank, and oil and gas leases and acquired radio stations KQAM/KEYN in Wichita, Kansas, and KAYC/KAYD in Beaumont, Texas. The company was dissolved in 1987 after the sale of its radio stations.

=== OneMusic Corporation (1990–2005) ===
In 1990, Long founded OneMusic in Del Mar, California, and created yet another innovative music library, increasingly used in radio, television (e.g., Saturday Night Live), and film production (e.g., the Oscar-winning A Beautiful Mind). And, LiquidTracks, a new concept in music production services, allowed clients to actually remix music to their own specifications. Long sold 50% of the OMC Library to Clive Calder's Zomba/FirstCom, which was purchased by BMG in 2002. In 2005 BMG purchased the remainder of the OMC Library from Long.

Divisions of OneMusic, but not part of the sale to BMG, included Honest Entertainment Group, Inc. and The Gold Label.

==== Honest Entertainment Group, Inc. (1992–2001)/The Gold Label (1999–2001) ====
Having already produced artists for the Capitol, MCA, and Atlantic labels, Long started his own record label in California in 1992, Honest Entertainment, as a vehicle for re-launching Charley Pride’s career. He produced three albums for Pride (Pride, My 6 Latest & 6 Greatest, Platinum Pride, Volumes 1 & 2, and Classics with Pride) which provided impetus for the Country Music Association Awards (CMA) to recognize Pride with their Pioneer Award and other accolades. As part of his marketing strategy, Long created the first direct response marketing (DR) campaign for a major artist that used 800# marketing to drive new retail sales, selling over 500,000 units through the combination of DR and retail. Honest developed similar campaigns for other artists, including country superstar, Alan Jackson.

Honest Entertainment opened offices in Nashville in 1994 and became known for its niche marketing of Irish artists, including Foster & Allen, Daniel O’Donnell, and Ronan Hardiman, the composer for Michael Flatley’s Lord of the Dance extravaganza. Honest also had its own roster of singer/songwriters, including Kate Wallace for whom Long produced the first “CD Plus” for a new artist marketing campaign, providing biographical audio as well as music video and behind the scenes footage (a new technology format, now familiar on DVD). It was at this time that he pioneered the use of the (almost unheard of then) Internet chat rooms for music listening tests, focus groups and market research.

Honest also featured a group of legendary older artists, including Jack Jones, for whom Long produced two albums, one of which received a Grammy nomination in 1998, Jack Jones Paints a Tribute to Tony Bennett(Bennett actually won the Grammy that year for his own CD.)(www.digitalhit.com/grammy) This group of older artists became a separate company, The Gold Label, in 1999 and was sold to Pat Boone in 2001.

==== Crucial Music Corporation (2007–2022) ====
Launched in 2006, Crucial Music Corporation (CMC) is one of the first fully online companies to use the Internet to link independent artists and musicians to those in the music industry who want their songs. CMC licenses music to radio, television, and film. A former OneMusic-Honest Entertainment executive, Tanvi Patel, serves as CEO and partner,(www.crucialmusic.com) while Long serves as chairman. CMC is headquartered in Suite 2 of 12031 Ventura Boulevard in Studio City, Los Angeles. Many bands and singers have licensed their music to movies through CMC, including Owen Chaim, Ronjii, Michael Kisur, The John D'Agostino Band, Curtis Marolt, Erin Reign, Attila, Ron Esposito, Thomas David Grant, Ellery, Shock of Pleasure, Christopher Welch, Kate Booye, Jon Estep, Juvon Taylor, Andy Bianco and Christopher Jon Winston. In January 2016, CMC launched Crucial Custom, a division that links composers to advertising agencies and licenses music to advertisement.

== Awards and recognition ==
In 2019 Long was inducted into the Production Music Association’s Hall of Fame, and posthumously received the first Lifetime Achievement Award, presented by the music connection organization, TAXI, in 2022.

In January 2025 the Grammy Museum Foundation has dedicated a gallery to Long to honor his legacy. The GMF Sonic Playground and Career Wall provides an interactive opportunity to learn about music careers, alongside experiential learning by music industry mentors.
