= November 2004 San Francisco general election =

The November 2004 San Francisco general elections were held on November 2, 2004, in San Francisco, California. The elections included seven seats to the San Francisco Board of Supervisors, four seats to the San Francisco Community College Board, four seats to the San Francisco Board of Education, and fourteen San Francisco ballot measures.

== Propositions ==
Note: "City" refers to the San Francisco municipal government.

=== Proposition A ===

Proposition A would allow the city to issue $200 million in bonds to finance the purchase and maintenance of affordable housing and housing assistance for low- and moderate-income households. This measure required a two-thirds majority to pass.

Proposition A
Choice	Votes	%
For	209,259	64.20
Against	116,706	35.80
Required majority		66.67
Total	325,965	100.00
Valid votes	325,965	90.09
Invalid/blank votes	35,857	9.91
Total votes	361,822	100.00
Registered voters/turnout		74.31

=== Proposition B ===

Proposition B would allow the city to issue $60 million in bonds to finance the purchase and maintenance of historical resources owned by the City and the San Francisco Unified School District. This measure required a two-thirds majority to pass.

Proposition B
Choice	Votes	%
For	181,658	57.39
Against	134,896	42.61
Required majority		66.67
Total	316,554	100.00
Valid votes	326,554	87.83
Invalid/blank votes	45,268	12.17
Total votes	371,822	100.00
Registered voters/turnout		74.31

=== Proposition C ===

Proposition C would establish the Health Service System as a separate City department and allow the Health Service Board to appoint and remove the manager for the System.

Proposition C
Choice	Votes	%
For	166,651	56.33
Against	129,210	43.67
Total	295,861	100.00
Valid votes	295,861	81.77
Invalid/blank votes	65,961	18.23
Total votes	361,822	100.00
Registered voters/turnout		74.31

=== Proposition D ===

Proposition D would change the City Charter regarding the Board of Supervisors by changing deadlines and vote requirements, restrictions on the number of aides, and commissioners' length of service after terms have expired.

Proposition D
Choice	Votes	%
For	118,123	42.11
Against	162,385	57.89
Total	280,508	100.00
Valid votes	280,508	77.53
Invalid/blank votes	81,314	22.47
Total votes	361,822	100.00
Registered voters/turnout		74.31

=== Proposition E ===

Proposition E would have the City pay to the survivors of a police officer or firefighter who dies in the line of duty 100% of the retirement benefits entitled to the officer or firefighter.

Proposition E
Choice	Votes	%
For	210,091	66.01
Against	108,193	33.99
Total	318,284	100.00
Valid votes	318,284	87.97
Invalid/blank votes	43,538	12.03
Total votes	361,822	100.00
Registered voters/turnout		74.31

=== Proposition F ===

Proposition F would allow adult noncitizen parents, guardians, and caregivers with children in the San Francisco Unified School District to vote in San Francisco Board of Education elections.

Proposition F
Choice	Votes	%
For	155,643	48.55
Against	164,924	51.45
Total	320,567	100.00
Valid votes	320,567	88.60
Invalid/blank votes	41,255	11.40
Total votes	361,822	100.00
Registered voters/turnout		74.31

=== Proposition G ===

Proposition G would allow the city to authorize the Health Services Board to establish health plans for City residents.

Proposition G
Choice	Votes	%
For	201,674	66.81
Against	100,206	33.19
Total	301,880	100.00
Valid votes	301,880	83.43
Invalid/blank votes	59,942	16.57
Total votes	361,822	100.00
Registered voters/turnout		74.31

=== Proposition H ===

Proposition H would name the stadium at Candlestick Point as Candlestick Park, effectively forbidding future naming rights contracts for the current stadium.

Proposition H
Choice	Votes	%
For	170,217	54.54
Against	141,904	45.46
Total	312,121	100.00
Valid votes	312,121	86.26
Invalid/blank votes	49,701	13.74
Total votes	361,822	100.00
Registered voters/turnout		74.31

=== Proposition I ===

Proposition I would create an Office of Economic Analysis, which will analyze proposed legislation and report its impact on the economy, and have the City create a long-term Economic Development Plan.

Proposition I
Choice	Votes	%
For	154,022	51.92
Against	142,650	48.08
Total	296,672	100.00
Valid votes	296,672	81.99
Invalid/blank votes	65,150	18.01
Total votes	361,822	100.00
Registered voters/turnout		74.31

=== Proposition J ===

Proposition J would increase the sales tax by ¼%.

Proposition J
Choice	Votes	%
For	131,529	41.89
Against	182,477	58.11
Total	314,006	100.00
Valid votes	314,006	86.78
Invalid/blank votes	47,816	13.22
Total votes	361,822	100.00
Registered voters/turnout		74.31

=== Proposition K ===

Proposition K would create a temporary 0.1% gross receipts tax and clarify the city's payroll expense tax for certain business entities.

Proposition K
Choice	Votes	%
For	135,068	45.33
Against	162,910	54.67
Total	297,978	100.00
Valid votes	297,978	82.35
Invalid/blank votes	63,844	17.65
Total votes	361,822	100.00
Registered voters/turnout		74.31

=== Proposition L ===

Proposition L would set aside 15% of hotel tax surcharge revenues for the acquisition, preservation, and maintenance of neighborhood and single-screen movie theaters and to promote the local film industry.

Proposition L
Choice	Votes	%
For	78,157	25.41
Against	229,487	74.59
Total	307,644	100.00
Valid votes	307,644	85.03
Invalid/blank votes	54,178	14.97
Total votes	361,822	100.00
Registered voters/turnout		74.31

=== Proposition M ===
Proposition M would prohibit the razing of buildings containing 20 or more habitable units. This measure was struck from the ballot due to a technicality.

=== Proposition N ===

Proposition N would make it City policy to urge the federal government to withdraw all troops from Iraq.

Proposition N
Choice	Votes	%
For	195,257	59.47
Against	133,053	40.53
Total	328,310	100.00
Valid votes	328,310	90.74
Invalid/blank votes	33,512	9.26
Total votes	361,822	100.00
Registered voters/turnout		74.31

=== Proposition O ===

Proposition O would make it City policy to use the sales tax funds from Proposition J for low-income residents and the homeless.

Proposition O
Choice	Votes	%
For	181,340	59.65
Against	122,644	40.35
Total	303,984	100.00
Valid votes	303,984	84.01
Invalid/blank votes	57,838	15.99
Total votes	361,822	100.00
Registered voters/turnout		74.31
