= Today's Best Hits =

American syndicated radio format

- Type: Radio network
- Country: United States

Programming
- Format: Hot adult contemporary

Ownership
- Owner: Westwood One

History
- Closed: 2014
- Former names: Best Hits, Best Variety

Coverage
- Availability: National; also distributed in Canada, Europe, Armed Forces Radio

Today's Best Hits was an American radio network with a Hot Adult Contemporary format. It played many contemporary songs. It also featured many retro (1980s) hits, and on Saturday night, it played only requested retro songs. The network was previously known as Best Hits, Best Variety. Today's Best Hits was a property of Cumulus Media Networks (now Westwood One).

"Retro Radio", the first nationwide radio broadcast devoted solely to music from the 1980s, was launched on Saturday nights in 1997. The show was created and hosted by Thom "Booray" Daniels until 2000. The format was dissolved as Cumulus Media Networks merged with Westwood One, as there was already a "Hot AC" satellite-fed format provided by that network.

== Sample hour of programming ==
- "1999" - Prince
- "Hey There Delilah" - Plain White T's
- "The Impression That I Get" - The Mighty Mighty Bosstones
- "Wake Up Call" - Maroon 5
- "Run-Around" - Blues Traveler
- "Never Again" - Kelly Clarkson
- "Rockstar" - Nickelback
- "Bad Day" - Daniel Powter
- "Waiting on the World to Change" - John Mayer
- "Her Diamonds" - Rob Thomas
- "Bleeding Love" - Leona Lewis
- "All Summer Long" - Kid Rock
- "If It Makes You Happy" - Sheryl Crow

== On-air personalities before closure ==
- Race Taylor

== Former on-air personalities ==
- Kidd Kraddick
- Barry Michaels

== Sources ==
- Westwood One
