= Triton Digital =

Digital audio technology and advertising company

Triton Digital, LLC, formerly Triton Media Group, is a digital audio technology and advertising company based in the US, with offices in New York, Paris, Montreal, London, and more. The group was formerly owned by E. W. Scripps Company, which sold Triton to iHeartMedia in October 2020. The company works with audio publishers in over 80 countries including brands such as BBC, Bloomberg, Cumulus, iHeartRadio, Bell Media, CBS Radio, and ESPN Radio.

== Company ==
Triton Digital was founded in August 2006 by Neal Schore and Mike Agovino in Sherman Oaks, California, in the Los Angeles area. It was funded as a limited partnership by private investors. In 2022, John Rosso, Triton Digital’s President of Market Development became the President and CEO.

=== Digital ===
Triton announced a partnership to resell Slipstream Radio in 2008. Triton Digital acquired Ando Media in September 2009. Ando Media was founded in 2004 in Denver, Colorado. Ando developed software to audience measurement metrics for Internet radio, competing with the major firm Arbitron by 2006. In 2011 Ernst & Young named Schore (chief executive of Triton Media at the time) entrepreneur of the year for Los Angeles area advertising companies. In April 2011, the Media Rating Council accredited Triton's Webcast Metrics product. In January 2013 Triton Digital pioneered the first programmatic audio ad exchange (named a2x.) In 2015 Triton Digital was acquired by Vector Capital. In October 2016, Triton launched Yield-Op, an in-house built SSP (Supply Side Platform) to power its ad exchange. In 2022, Triton Digital unveiled TAP, its advertising platform that provides clients a seamless experience for the entire lifecycle of audio ad campaigns.

=== Awards ===
AdExchanger's 2024 Top 50 Programmatic Power Players: This annual list highlights the best agencies, strategic partners, technology service providers, and consultants in the digital marketing industry.

Asia-Pacific Broadcasting+ Awards 2023: In June 2023, SPH Media's AWEDIO app, powered by Triton Digital, received the Excellence Award for Radio Podcast - Singapore, acknowledging outstanding achievement in radio podcasting within the region.

Business Insider's Rising Star of Adtech 2023: Simon Lee, Triton Digital’s Audio Marketplace Operations Director, was honored as a "Rising Star of Adtech" in 2023, recognizing forward-thinking, up-and-coming executives in the advertising technology space.

The Drum's Industry Best Sell-Side Technology for Digital Audio Trading 2022: Triton Digital's Supply Side Platform (SSP), Yield-Op, received this award, highlighting its excellence in digital audio trading technology.

=== omny.fm ===
omny.fm is a .fm website that has hosted among others the Bloomberg Odd Lots podcast co-hosted by Joe Weisenthal and Tracy Alloway. Shows on omny.fm are published through the software Omny Studio. Omny Studio offers an "audio management solution for podcasters and radio stations".

== Acquisitions ==
=== Ando Media ===
In September 2009, Triton Media Group acquired Ando Media, a company which developed products for internet radio and the content delivery industry that assisted stations in monetizing their audience. These products include Webcast Metrics (audience measurement), Ad Injector (ad injection prior to or into a stream including impression measurement), and PodLoc (creates podcasts of any audio on the fly and make available for download as well as measurement). Ando Media had been formed in 2004 by a software company, Ando Media, Inc. and Aritaur Communications, Inc. an owner of radio stations and Internet related ventures.

=== E. W. Scripps Company ===
On October 17, 2018, the E. W. Scripps Company announced its intention to acquire Triton Digital for $150 million in cash. If approved, the sale is expected to close by the end of 2018. Scripps will continue to run Triton as a separate entity.

=== Spreaker ===
In March 2021, iHeartMedia acquired Voxnest, the parent company of podcast hosting platform Spreaker. Following the acquisition, Voxnest rebranded as Spreaker from iHeart. In 2024, Spreaker joined the Triton Digital family. By bringing the two teams together, Triton Digital was able to expand globally with enhanced hosting and monetization options.

=== iHeartMedia ===
On February 17, 2021, iHeartMedia announced that it has entered into an agreement with The E. W. Scripps Company to acquire Triton Digital for $230 million.

=== Jelli ===
In June 2022, Triton Digital joined forces with Jelli, the leading tech solution for the global radio market.

=== Manadge ===
In June 2023, Triton Digital acquired Manadge, an advertising intelligence platform specializing in programmatic advertising.

=== Sounder ===
On March 26, 2024, Triton Digital announced that it acquired Sounder, an AI based audio intelligence platform, to provide contextual targeting solutions, brand suitability, and podcast promotional tools.

== Integrations ==
In May 2019, TouchPoint DSP by dataxu integrated Triton Digital inventory.

== Publishers ==
In December 2018, Triton did a partnership with Deezer, distributing audio ads programmatic across 20 countries worldwide.

In April 2019, Stingray taped Triton for audio monetisation.

In November 2019, BFM (Malaysia) partners with Triton Digital for audio monetization.
