= Russ Martin =

American talk radio host (1960–2021)

- Born: Russell Dale Martin; October 4, 1960; Dallas, Texas, U.S.
- Died: February 27, 2021 (aged 60); Frisco, Texas, U.S.
- Presenting career
- Show: The Russ Martin Show
- Stations: KEGL (1987–2000); KLLI-FM (2000–2008); KEGL (2010–2021)
- Time slot: Monday – Friday; 5:00pm – 7:00pm
- Style: Hot talk
- Country: United States
- Website: kegl.iheart.com/featured/the-russ-martin-show/

Russell Dale Martin (October 4, 1960 – February 27, 2021) was an American radio personality in Dallas, Texas. He worked in the Dallas radio market for 31 years. Martin hosted the No. 1-rated The Russ Martin Show on KLLI Live 105.3 in Dallas, until December 8, 2008, when KLLI switched to an all-sports format. On July 12, 2010, Martin returned to radio with his afternoon (3:00 p.m.–7:00 p.m.) show on 97.1 "The Eagle" (KEGL).

== Early life and career ==
Martin grew up in Pleasant Grove, a large, working-class neighborhood in southeast Dallas, where he graduated from W.W. Samuell High School. Martin's radio career began in the 1980s at KGVL 1400 AM in Greenville, Texas, working 6:00 p.m. to midnight running the board for religious programs.

In 1982, Martin was hired by KTLR 107.1 FM in Terrell, Texas, to play country music on weekends. A year later, in 1983, he was hired by KAAM 1310 AM in Dallas as a part-time weekend disc jockey. In 1986, Martin was hired for another part-time position by the Satellite Music Network for an oldies format, and later worked part-time for Z-Rock while still working at KAAM and KAFM.

In 1987 Martin was hired by Top 40 station KEGL, The Eagle, in Dallas. He also hosted a talk show on Sunday nights at KEGL. He hosted the television shows Hot TV and Hot Tickets which ran from 1988 to 1994 on the then local FOX affiliate KDAF.

== The Russ Martin Show ==
The first incarnation of The Russ Martin Show began following the departure of The Howard Stern Show from KEGL. In 1997 he was asked to fill morning drive time slot. Within two years, Martin's ratings had surpassed those of Dallas veteran radio personality Ron Chapman.

In 2000, Martin left KEGL following a contract dispute. The Russ Martin Show reappeared on KYNG, a station that had previously been country-western music. Martin began his first show at KYNG on April 6, 2000, once again filling the morning drive time slot. When Howard Stern was picked up by KYNG, The Russ Martin Show moved from its morning drive slot to 3:00 p.m.–7:00 p.m. In 2003, KYNG changed its call letters to KLLI and took on the Live 105.3 branding.

The Russ Martin Show had consistently high ratings for KLLI since his show debuted on 105.3. In August 2005, D Magazine named Martin best radio talk show host in the DFW area.

In December 2008, Live 105.3 changed its format to include more live sports programming, and Martin was eliminated during the switch. Subsequently, his former staffer spoke out against him. "Stuff he'd say to us on the air he wouldn't say to us in the hall, because he's a coward," says J.D. Ryan, Martin's radio right-hand man for 25 years. "To him everything was a bit, but eventually he crossed the line. It became personal. He made it clear that being successful wasn't enough. For him to be truly happy, those around him also had to fail miserably."

On July 1, 2010, KEGL ran a promo announcing the return of The Russ Martin Show. The show began airing on July 12, 2010, in the 6:00 a.m.–10:00 a.m. time slot.

On September 14, 2011, KEGL started airing best-of-episodes of The Russ Martin Show during the show's daypart for an extended period of time. On September 22, 2011, KEGL's then-program director Chris Ryan, announced the Russ Martin Show would be moving to the 3:00 p.m.–7:00 p.m. time slot beginning September 26, 2011.

On November 17, 2014, KEGL's sister station KFXR-AM began airing previous afternoon episodes of the show weekdays from 7:00 a.m.–11:00 a.m.

Starting in 2016, Russ began having various medical issues and missed several shows throughout the year. Dan, Clo, and Alfie carried the show, with help from Scott West on occasion, and remained at the top of the ratings despite Russ' absences.

In addition to Russ Martin, cast members include Dan O'Malley, Clo Raborn, Alfie Coy, and Jerry Caldwell. The show has a number of recurring guests including Dr. Scott Thornton, Everett Newton, Captain Mark Howard, Mark Verma, Scott West, and Ty Jäger.

On January 15, 2020 Jerry Caldwell and Ty Jäger were released from the show as a result of sweeping iHeartRadio budget cuts.

The theme song for The Russ Martin Show is Fire and Mercy by William Orbit from the 1987 Strange Cargo album.

== Charity work ==
Martin founded The Russ Martin Show Listeners Foundation in 2002, which benefits the families of police officers and firefighters who have died in the line of duty. The Foundation also coordinates an annual parade called the Heroes Day Parade. In 2006 he formed The Russ Martin Show Experience, a band made up of RMS cast members, regular guests and local musicians. The band performs rock cover songs at live venues and at an annual "White Trash Party" to raise money for charity. The shows benefit The Russ Martin Show Listeners Foundation.

== Interests ==
Russ Martin's interests included 1960s television show character Batman as portrayed by Adam West, as well as his fascination with James Garner and the character Jim Rockford. Martin also owned a collection of classic TV show cars such as a Dukes of Hazzard's General Lee replica, the fastest 1966 Batmobile replica, a Munster Koach replica, and the 1976 Ford Grand Torino from Starsky and Hutch.

== Controversy ==
Southlake, Texas police arrested Russ Martin at Larry North Fitness on July 18, 2008, on charges of aggravated assault-bodily injury-deadly weapon following an incident on July 14, 2008, concerning his then-girlfriend Mandy Blake. Martin was accused of pulling her hair, kicking her, and brandishing a pistol. According to the arrest warrant affidavit, on July 14, Martin called the woman and asked if she had followed up about a package he sent to the IRS. When she told him she had not, he told her, among other things, "You better hide, because when I get there I'm going to beat the shit out of you." The charges were reduced to misdemeanor assault, and he accepted a plea bargain and pleaded no contest. He was placed on two years deferred probation, and was required to complete a batterer's intervention program. On February 10, 2009, nearly eight months after the incident, Mandy Blake filed a complaint with the Southlake police department, claiming to have been coerced into making a statement for what she considered a very minor incident. Martin stated that no one from the DA's office or Southlake police had ever contacted him to get his side of the story.

Clois Glenn “Clo” Raborn, a radio personality who occasionally appeared on The Russ Martin Show was charged in January 2022 with producing child pornography—an investigation that stemmed from images discovered on his laptop in March 2021. In March 2022, he pleaded guilty to sexual exploitation of a child, and in October was sentenced to 24 years in federal prison.

== Death ==
Martin had health problems for years, including heart surgery. He was found dead at his home in Frisco, Texas on February 27, 2021. Frisco Police Department said no foul play was suspected.

== See also ==
- List of radio stations in Texas
- KRLD-FM
