= KLIF =

KLIF may refer to:

- KLIF (AM), a radio station (570 AM) licensed to Dallas, Texas, United States
- WBAP-FM, a radio station (93.3 FM) licensed to Haltom City, Texas, United States, which held the call sign KLIF-FM from 2009 to 2024
- KFXR (AM), a radio station (1190 AM) licensed to Dallas, Texas, which held the call sign KLIF from 1947 to 1990
- KSPF, a radio station (98.7 FM) licensed to Dallas, Texas, which held the call sign KLIF-FM from 1963 to 1966
