= KDMX =

Radio station in Dallas

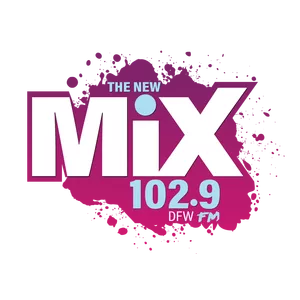
- Dallas, Texas; United States
- Broadcast area: Dallas–Fort Worth metroplex
- Frequency: 102.9 MHz (HD Radio)
- Branding: The NEW Mix 102.9

Programming
- Language: English
- Format: Hot adult contemporary
- Affiliations: Premiere Networks

Ownership
- Owner: iHeartMedia; (iHM Licenses, LLC)
- Sister stations: KDGE; KEGL; KFXR; KHKS; KHVN; KKGM; KZPS

History
- First air date: 1960
- Former call signs: KQRO (1960–1965); KEIR (1965–1971); KDTX (1971–1977); KMGC (1977–1991)
- Call sign meaning: "Dallas' Mix"

Technical information
- Licensing authority: FCC
- Facility ID: 47739
- Class: C
- ERP: 100,000 watts
- HAAT: 1,788 feet (545 m)
- Transmitter coordinates: 32.58167°N 96.97556°W

Links
- Public license information: Public file; LMS
- Webcast: Listen live (via iHeartRadio)
- Website: mix1029.iheart.com

KDMX (102.9 FM) is a radio station serving the Dallas–Fort Worth metroplex in Texas. It is currently owned and operated by iHeartMedia, and airs a hot adult contemporary format. The station's studios are located along Dallas Parkway in Farmers Branch (although it has a Dallas address), and the transmitter site is in Cedar Hill.

== History ==
=== Classical (1959–1965) ===
This station first began broadcasting as KQRO on October 15, 1960 (although license was granted on July 2, 1959). It went silent a year later, then returned to the airwaves in 1962. For that time, KQRO's format consisted mostly of classical and orchestral music.

=== Middle of the Road (1965–1971) ===
In October 1965, the callsign was changed to KEIR after being purchased by trade school Elkins Institute of Radio and Electronics. The station was used for training by Elkins with a two-room studio and transmitter located in the Life Building on Jackson Street in downtown Dallas, although the school was located near Love Field on Inwood Road. The station's Effective Radiated Power (ERP) was 9,700 watts and was difficult to receive outside Loop 635 around Dallas. The station's format was "Middle of the Road" featuring easy listening vocal and instrumental album tracks from 11 a.m. to 11 pm. daily. The station was sold by Elkins when the school obtained a license for a non-commercial FM station in 1971.

=== Religious (1971–1977) ===
In June 1971, the call letters were changed once again to KDTX, this time with a religious format. Six years later, the callsign was changed to KMGC (the KDTX call letters were later used on a local TV station in 1987, with Christian programming) and the Christian contemporary format continued up until September 1977. In 1976, KDTX's owners, Starr Broadcasting, attempted to sell the station to Fairchild, which owned KLIF. Since Fairchild purchased just KLIF from McLendon a few years earlier, and not its sister FM KNUS, KLIF no longer had an FM sister station. Not wanting another FM competitor, McLendon vigorously campaigned against the sale, which never consummated.

=== "Magic 102.9" (1977–1991) ===
On September 19, 1977, KMGC switched to a "beautiful rock" format. The station touted the fact that it was between Album Rock KTXQ and Pop/Adult KVIL, both on the radio dial and in its music format. Initially promoted as "Mellow 102.9", the station soon adopted its longtime Magic 102.9 handle. Prior to that, a mass distribution of door-hanger flyers announced the station is coming. In 1987, KMGC added light jazz music to its format, promoted as "Lite Rock, Lite Jazz." By 1989, the format had again become fulltime Adult Contemporary.

=== "Mix 102.9" (1991–2012) ===
The station enjoyed a loyal following until May 9, 1991, when, after Nationwide Communications bought the station, KMGC began stunting with a series of formats ranging from rock oldies (as "Cool 102.9" on May 9) to country (as "Kickin' Country" on May 10) to an all-Beatles format (also on May 10), and then party cocktail noise on May 11 and 12, before changing to its current callsign and settling on its long-running hot adult contemporary format as "Mix 102.9" on May 13 at 5:30 a.m. Program Director Pat McMahon, Assistant Program Director Steve Knoll and Production Director Dave Kay planned the stunting. In 1997, Nationwide was sold (including KDMX and sister KEGL) to Jacor. In 1999, Jacor merged with Clear Channel Communications.

In 2009, Clear Channel (now iHeartMedia) laid off over 2,000 employees to lower costs and forced its "Mix" branded stations to voice track most of their airtime, leaving very few live personalities across the nation. Among laying off in Dallas, the voices of midday personality Lisa Thomas was replaced with fellow Clear Channel station KUSS's midday personality, Cindy Spicer. Late night personality Joe Kelley was replaced with voicetracking. Morning co-hosts Tony Zazza and Cappy were replaced with weeknight personality Jen Austin and Program Director Rick. Zazza then became the morning host at former competing station CBS Radio-owned 103.7 KVIL, which flipped full-time to Hot AC/Adult Top 40 in early 2014. Cappy went on as a producer for Kidd Kraddick in the Morning, Johnjay and Rich, and On-Air with Ryan Seacrest. Later that year, Jen Austin was laid off as well. With afternoons, shortly hosted by PD Rick, but was later replaced by the satellite-fed On Air with Ryan Seacrest.

In 2011, in response to changing listener habits, KDMX began adding more hip-hop and EDM titles to its playlist, and was briefly marketed as "The New Sound of Mix 102.9".

=== "102-9 NOW" (2012–2023) ===
Logo as "Now", 2012-2023; logo as "Mix" as of 2023 is similar, but reads "Mix" in place of "Now".

On May 18, 2012, KDMX rebranded as 102.9 Now, dropping most modern AC artists, and shifted to an adult top 40 format heavy on currents and recurrents. However, as of October 2012, KDMX returned to Hot AC. Some of the Modern AC artists have returned to the station's playlist, and dropped some hip hop tracks, though the station still has a current-heavy focus with less dependence on gold tracks. The switch back to Hot AC was likely due to low ratings, as well as to avoid playlist overlap with sister Top 40 KHKS. Starting in 2014, the station aired the syndicated "Bert Show" in morning drive, which originated from WWWQ in Atlanta. The show was later dropped and replaced with a music-heavy morning show.

=== Return to "Mix" (2023–present) ===
On June 9, 2023, at 2 p.m., after playing "When I Was Your Man" by Bruno Mars, KDMX returned to the "Mix 102.9" branding; the first song under the revived "Mix" brand was "Please Don't Leave Me" by P!nk. A new morning show hosted by Billy the Kidd and Candice Lopez launched on June 26.

== KDMX-HD2 ==
KDMX originally launched a secondary HD Radio (HD2) subchannel known as "The Music Summit", broadcasting an AAA format. It has since then moved to KZPS 92.5-HD2 to make way for Pride Radio (previously on KHKS-HD2) with a format intended for the LGBT community. On March 28, 2011, 102.9-HD2 flipped to a Soft Oldies/AC Gold format as "Sunny 102.9-HD2", shifting "Pride Radio" back to 106.1-HD2. Beginning January 8, 2014, KDMX-HD2's format has been changed to a syndicated Delilah nighttime love songs program that was previously dropped by KVIL.

In September 2018, "Delilah" was replaced with KDMX's former "Mix" branding, following a similar move at sister KDGE, which relaunched their former alternative format under the long-time "Edge" branding.

As of February 2021, KDMX-HD2 ceased operations, leaving no programming replacement.
