= Paxton Mills =

- Born: Harry Paxton Mills; November 5, 1948; Dallas, Texas, US
- Died: June 25, 2001 (aged 52); Aspen, Colorado, US
- Education: North Texas State University
- Occupation: Radio personality
- Years active: 1967–2001

Harry Paxton Mills (November 5, 1948 – June 25, 2001) was an American radio broadcaster and announcer. He was best known for his work at KLIF in the Dallas-Fort Worth Metroplex in the 1960s and 1970s and at KIMN, KOSI, and KXKL-FM in Denver, Colorado from 1981 until his death in 2001.

== Early life ==
Mills was born in Dallas, Texas, on November 5, 1948. He grew up in the Lakewood neighborhood of Dallas and attended W.T. White High School.

== Career ==
=== KVIL-AM/FM ===
Mills' first job in broadcasting was in 1967 at KVIL-AM/FM in Dallas. Just 18 years old when he started, Mills was heard on both the AM and FM bands. The KVIL studio was then located in the Highland Park Village shopping center.

=== KLIF broadcaster ===
In April 1968 Mills took a position at Dallas Top 40 radio station KLIF which was located at the 1190 AM frequency. Its daytime power was 50,000 watts and it was Dallas's top-rated radio station. Mills' time slot was overnight and he was heard all over Dallas. He announced commercials and promoted station events. In May 1969, Mills moved to the evening time slot where he was heard from 6PM-9PM weeknights. In October 1969, Mills and Rod Roddy (who was also a KLIF broadcaster at the time) examined in depth the "Paul Is Dead" urban legend about Paul McCartney of The Beatles. From October 1972 to August 1973, Mills was a solo anchor of the KLIF morning show. In September 1973 he was joined by fellow KLIF announcer Dave Ambrose and they hosted the morning show together until August 1974.

=== Voice in FM stereo ===
Gordon McLendon owned KLIF along with FM station KNUS-FM, now known as KSPF. KNUS was located in the KLIF Triangle Point Studios in Downtown Dallas as well and Mills was also a voice of KNUS. At the time AM was still dominated by Top 40 formatted stations and KNUS was album-oriented rock and underground music formatted. There were still fewer radios with the FM band at the time but Mills had helped KNUS get attention.

=== Leaving KLIF ===
In August 1974 Mills left KLIF for KGB in San Diego where former KLIF announcer Charlie Van Dyke hired him. After that position he went back to KLIF. Then he went from KLIF to KXOL-AM in Fort Worth. He continued to be a popular announcer in Dallas–Fort Worth and was heard advertising and promoting various local events on the radio.

=== After Dallas–Fort Worth ===
Mills left Dallas–Fort Worth in the late 1970s and worked with former KLIF personality Randy Robins at WIXY-AM in Cleveland, Ohio.

Mills also worked at Cleveland AM powerhouse 1220/WGAR plus did weekend weather at WEWS-TV.

Mills settled as a longtime voice of Denver, Colorado. He was heard and seen in many different promotions of local events and advertising on air. He was at stations KIMN, KOSI, and KXKL-FM. In 2000, Mills and broadcast partner Rick "Coach" Marshall were named the Best Morning Show by the Colorado Broadcasters Association. Mills remained a dominant figure in Denver broadcasting for over 23 years.

== Personal life ==
Mills was married three times. He had three children: Matthew, Joshua, and Samantha. On June 25, 2001, Paxton died due to heart disease in a hotel in Aspen, Colorado.
