= Tony Zazza =

Tony Zazza has been a radio personality, entrepreneur and philanthropist in the Dallas – Fort Worth Metroplex for over 11 years.

He is now the morning host for WAOA-FM in Melbourne, Florida.

Tony was born on June 25, 1975, in San Diego, California. He is the eldest of five children and moved to Hillsboro, Texas after high school on a Baseball scholarship to attend Hill College. After two years, Tony transferred to Tarleton State University in Stephenville, Texas and continued playing baseball.

== Career Start in Media ==
At Tarleton, Tony began writing for MTV, covering the Metroplex's entertainment and music scene. He edited and reported on local events and interviewed Kidd Kraddick before starting his radio career in Tarleton. Before graduating, Tony auditioned for KDMX and was hired on his birthday, June 25, in 1998.

== Career at KDMX ==
Working his way up from weekends, Tony became a fixture of KDMX's afternoon drive before eventually hosting the "Morning Mix". An early stunt received some criticism from the Dallas Gay community.

== Awards ==
Tony was named On-Air Personality of the Year by AWRT (American Women in Radio and Television) in 2007, and was nominated for On-Air Personality of the Year in 2004 by R&R (Radio and Records) and The RMA's (Radio Music Awards).

== Entrepreneurship ==
In January 2009, Tony was let go from KDMX as a part of Clear Channel Communications massive layoffs.

Tony has since begun his own Media Strategies firm to offer branding, exposure, marketing and advertising services to small and medium-sized businesses called Zazza Media Strategies. Since July 2009 Tony has been back on the air at his old competition.

== Tony Zazza's Jingle Jet ==
In 2007, Tony lent his idea for Jingle Jet, a fantasy flight to take five deserving families on a trip to the "North Pole" using the Dallas Stars and Texas Rangers team plane, to KDMX for them to sponsor. KDMX partnered with Tony for the event's first two years. Tony was allowed to solicit nominations for families who had experienced hardship through the year on the air.

In 2009, Tony organized Jingle Jet without a radio sponsor for the first time. Still sponsored by the Dallas Stars, Tony brought five families to the North Pole yet again using the teams' plane. Mike Modano and his wife, Willa Ford, are major supporters of Jingle Jet and for the first time, Mike was able to attend the event.
