= Lex and Terry =

Syndicated morning radio program

Lex and Terry is a syndicated morning radio program hosted by Lex Staley and Terry Jaymes. Lex and Terry is Based in Dallas, Texas, the show is distributed by United Stations Radio Networks. It is heard during weekdays on radio stations throughout the US. The current Lex and Terry team consists of show hosts Lex Staley and Terry Jaymes, plus longtime staff member Dee Reed as executive producer/air talent, and Sarah B. Morgan.

== History ==
Prior to the show, Jaymes gained popularity as an actor on Santa Barbara and also as a stand-up comedian, including on the Fox network on the critically acclaimed The Sunday Comics. Jaymes also hosted mornings at KTYD in Santa Barbara and was a member of the Blaze and Bob morning show on KOME "the kome spot on your dial". Staley was on his second tour as program director at WFYV-FM "Rock 105" in Jacksonville, Florida, where he brought Jaymes to join him to do mornings in 1992. Staley had met Jaymes in California earlier and promised if he was ever in charge of a radio station again, Jaymes would be his first and only choice to host mornings. Staley had enjoyed a successful first stint as a program director in the mid '80s at WFYV before he left for a four-year stint at the Album Network in Los Angeles as VP of Syndication for World Premiere events for major music acts, such as Robert Plant, Guns N' Roses, Bruce Springsteen, Van Halen, and John Mellencamp. He said his coolest moment was as co-producer alongside soon to be world renown producer Brenden O'Brien at The Black Crowes Live at the Greek Theatre in the summer of 1992. Staley was also the executive producer for the weekly syndicated show hosted by Redbeard called In the Studio. Years later, Staley and Jaymes would be working on a daily basis with Redbeard at KTXQ "Q 102" in Dallas.

On December 16, 1992, Staley and Jaymes began collaborating in the morning on WFYV. The first show was a whirlwind of controversy in and out of the building as the phones exploded concerning Ross Jeffries, the author of How To Get The Women You Desire Into Bed. His interaction with WFYV's new morning duo was unlike anything the city had ever experienced. It was so uncomfortable for management that Staley was asked to put Jaymes on a plane back to California if that was what the show was going to be. Unbeknownst that this irreverence would set the tone for years to come, Lex and Terry served notice that things had changed for Jacksonville, WFYV-FM, and its two hosts. The show took a while to succeed; some people did not like the "two punks in a locker room" attitude. Eventually, Lex and Terry had the number one morning show in Jacksonville, with a mix of frank relationship talk, sports (including Sam Kouvaris of WJXT), and sometimes music from such artists as AC/DC and Danzig. WFYV general manager Mark Schwartz said, "Unlike a lot of other morning shows that rely on tired bits and material that's stolen from other radio stations, these guys are 100 percent unique. They don't rely on joke services. They're extraordinarily topical."

In 1997, Lex and Terry first went into syndication as the show moved to Dallas, Texas, at KTXQ "Q-102" and remained on WFYV-FM Rock 105 in Jacksonville. This was the catalyst for the start of the duo's successful syndication career that continues today. In May of that year, Lex and Terry began airing on KTXQ in Dallas. By the end of the year, Lex and Terry were also on WFXH in the Savannah, Georgia, market. Promotion of the show included showing the duo with milk mustaches, a blonde stripper with large breasts between them, and the tagline "Got Milk?" Peter Welpton of KTXQ called Lex and Terry an "affordable major market radio show" which gave smaller markets the talent and advantages of a large-market show, along with promotion help, and breaks for news and local information. Celebrity guests included Howie Long, Alan Thicke, Denis Leary, David Lee Roth, Norah Jones, and Bill O'Reilly, as well as porn actress and call-in host Juli Ashton.

The "Telecom Bill" was a huge factor of what happened next for Lex and Terry as broadcasting companies were able to buy many more properties than they were before, and the duo got caught up in a whirlwind of acquisitions that eventually swallowed up their host station KTXQ. Despite the show's positive impact on its ratings, KTXQ changed formats as the result of the station's sale and dropped Lex and Terry on September 1, 1998. A firing story that is still told until this day. Lex and Terry moved their show back to Jacksonville, where it was the top morning show among rock radio stations. By this time, the show could also be heard in Key West and Bluefield, West Virginia. On September 11, Lex and Terry debuted in Augusta, Georgia. Gainesville, Florida, and two other markets also planned to add the show, according to Schwartz. He also said the show would likely be added to other stations of WFYV owner Capstar Broadcasting.

=== 2005-present ===
By 2005, Lex and Terry were heard on 22 radio stations, with an XM channel added late in November. Also that year, the show's contract with WFYV owner Cox Radio ended, and Staley and Jaymes signed with Clear Channel Communications, hoping to promote the show. A reason for the change was that Cox Radio would not allow the show to run on stations that competed with its stations while Clear Channel would. Despite being the number one morning show for years in the market the hosts called "Freakville", Lex and Terry was off WFYV and not heard in Jacksonville until February 2006, returning on Planet Radio 107.3. The show remained on Planet Radio until a format change in 2010.

University of Florida radio station WRUF-FM stopped airing the show on Fridays in April 2005 because of a feature called "Drunk Bitch Friday". Cox Radio decided the station had violated its contract and dropped WRUF as an affiliate. Staley and Jaymes both disagreed with the university's decision, with Staley claiming this action violated the First Amendment. The Federal Communications Commission had never found the feature to be indecent, but the university did not want to appear to condone drinking excessively. On Drunk Bitch Friday, "a female participant is chauffeured to the station, drinks to 'a state of inebriation that is entertaining,' and provides commentary and advice to callers." Welpton called the feature, a part of the show for two years at the time, a "good educational tool to demonstrate the effects of alcohol, and why drinking responsibly is important." The announcement was made on January 20, 2006, that the feature was being dropped. As a result, WRUF brought back the show. Although Lex and Terry held the number one position among men 18-34 for eight straight Arbitron ratings periods, WRUF changed to country music in October 2010, dropping the show. Active rock WHHZ picked it up on November 29, but dropped the show in mid-2015.

In the Dallas radio market, Staley and Jaymes returned to live in Dallas, Texas, and KDGE "The Edge" became the flagship station for the Lex and Terry radio network. It took less than two years for Lex and Terry to establish ratings dominance in the Metroplex with 18-34 adults in morning drive in the nation's number four market. The move to Dallas was explained by the duo as necessary because the Charlotte's and Nashville's of the world questioned the credibility of Jacksonville, Florida, success as not being a good enough market to roll the dice on the show to be cleared in the larger medium markets. Lex & Terry decided to rip the band aid off and take care of business in a major market to lay that concern to rest. Which as stated earlier, they did. Soon markets like Oklahoma City, Tampa, and more had no reason not to accept the show, in addition to their 2004 Marconi nomination as the best syndicated show. They eventually lost out to The Tom Joyner Show. In 2008, on a trip with the NHL's Dallas Stars, the duo were notified that they were being moved to another signal in Dallas to accommodate the feelings of upper management that they would be better served on the hard-leaning classic rock format of KEGL 97.1, "The Eagle". This decision did not sit will with the duo, but it was done. After Bain Capital acquired Clear Channel and the station became part of IHeartRadio, Lex and Terry and numerous other shows, in budgeting moves by the company, went without renewed contracts, and eventually, Staley and Jaymes went in business by themselves. The show is now without a flagship station in Dallas. Later that year, United Stations Radio Networks replaced Clear Channel as the show's distributor.

=== Personnel ===
Kim McCafferty served as news director from the time the show was in Jacksonville but left in April 2007 to return to Florida. Scott Richards was producer of Lex and Terry until November 2008, when he also decided to return to Florida. Jason Carr of WZZR in West Palm Beach became executive producer in 2008, eventually replacing Welpton as director of network operations in September 2010. At the end of 2010, Carr also went back to Florida. Devell Reed took on the position of Executive Producer/Air Talent where he remains presently.

Ian Gleason, a show regular with the Pub Quiz, was brought in from New York City in January 2012 to serve as the news director following the departure of Welpton and Tyler "Taint" Baker the previous year. In July, 2019, Gleason was let go due to budgetary reasons and a shift away from news programming.

In 2016, longtime phone screener and on-air personality Sarah Morgan left the show to pursue a career in the cruise ship industry and was replaced by Krystina Byford, a Texas native who did promotions for The Ticket in Dallas. Byford left in June 2018 and was replaced by Morgan, who returned as a full-time on-air personality.
