= UTA Radio =

College radio station at the University of Texas at Arlington

Coordinates: 32°43′50″N 97°6′54″W

Programming
- Format: College radio

Ownership
- Owner: University of Texas at Arlington

Links
- Webcast: Listen live (via iHeartRadio)
- Website: radio.uta.edu

UTA Radio is an indie rock college radio station based at The University of Texas, Arlington. The station is an online radio station run primarily by students with the help of the faculty and staff members from the Department of Communication. Their slogan is Online All The Time.

== History ==
UTA Radio's studios and classrooms have been used since the 1970s. Programs were delivered over the department's loudspeaker system, since there was no terrestrial radio signal to broadcast on. By the 90s, cable television provided another outlet for programs and class projects. In the spring of 2000, UTA Radio began internet broadcasts by providing live coverage of UTA baseball and softball.

Since 2007, UTA Radio began providing 24/7 broadcasts. In addition to its regular music format, the station also provides play-by-play coverage for UTA's basketball, baseball, softball, and volleyball teams.

In March 2012, UTA Radio joined the iHeartRadio streaming platform.

== Awards ==
In 2011, the station won a Radio Mercury Award in the student PSA category. The station was also a finalist in 2013, 2018, 2022, 2023, and 2025.

In 2012, and again in 2013, UTA Radio was nominated for a CMJ College Radio Award for 'Best Student Run, Internet-only Station'.

In 2024, the station won Signature Station of the Year from the Broadcast Educators Association (BEA) Signature Station Award.

== Notable activities ==
- Rocktober was first aired in October, 2011. This annual concert series includes local bands whose music is featured on UTA Radio.
- Since 2018, the station has set aside a day to play vinyl records as part of College Radio Day's Vinylthon.
- On April 8, 2024, the station covered the total solar eclipse that passed over north Texas with a live broadcast from the UTA Planetarium.

== Notable alumni ==
- Candice Huckeba, DJ
- Josh Sours, Sports Broadcaster, UTA Athletics
- Eli Jordan, Sports Broadcaster, KTCK-FM
- Jeff K, DJ/PA Announcer, KZPS 92.5, Dallas Stars, Dallas Cowboys
- Linah Mohammad, Producer, All Things Considered
- Parker Hillis, Program Director
- Jason Kellison, Program Coordinator, The Ticket
- Terri Nolan, Writer
- Cory Mose, Sports Reporter
