= KEGL =

Radio station in Fort Worth, Texas

Coordinates: 32.589°N 96.968°W

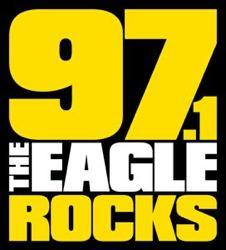
- Fort Worth, Texas; United States
- Broadcast area: Dallas–Fort Worth metroplex
- Frequency: 97.1 MHz (HD Radio)
- Branding: 97.1 The Eagle

Programming
- Language: English
- Format: Active rock
- Subchannels: HD2: Alternative rock “The Edge 97.1 HD2”

Ownership
- Owner: iHeartMedia, Inc.; (iHM Licenses, LLC)
- Sister stations: KDGE; KDMX; KFXR; KHKS; KHVN; KKGM; KZPS

History
- First air date: June 7, 1959 (as KFJZ-FM)
- Former call signs: KFJZ-FM (1959–1969); KWXI (1969–1976); KFJZ-FM (1976–1981)
- Call sign meaning: "Eagle"

Technical information
- Licensing authority: FCC
- Facility ID: 18114
- Class: C
- ERP: 100,000 watts
- HAAT: 508 meters (1,667 ft)

Links
- Public license information: Public file; LMS
- Webcast: Listen live (via iHeartRadio); HD2: Listen live (via iHeartRadio)
- Website: 971theeagle.iheart.com

KEGL (97.1 FM) is a commercial radio station licensed to Fort Worth, Texas, and serving the Dallas–Fort Worth metroplex. The station's studios are located along Dallas Parkway in Farmers Branch, although it has a Dallas address. It is owned by iHeartMedia.

KEGL has an effective radiated power (ERP) of 100,000 watts. The transmitter site is in Cedar Hill. KEGL broadcasts using HD Radio technology. KEGL's HD-2 subchannel carries an alternative rock format known as "97.1 The Edge" broadcasting on HD2 as the legacy of 102.1 The Edge that once was on air in the dallas-Fort Worth metroplex prior to their format change several years ago.

== History ==
=== Early years ===
The station signed on the air on June 7, 1959, as KFJZ-FM, the sister to KFJZ AM and TV. It initially aired a format of standards, jazz and classical music, while simulcasting its AM station from 3 pm to midnight. In April 1969, the call letters were changed to KWXI, and the station promoted itself as "Kwiksie" with an easy listening format. In October 1976, the call letters were changed back to KFJZ-FM and the station began simulcasting its AM full-time the following month.

In February 1977, KFJZ-FM broke off the simulcast of KFJZ, and began its own Top 40 format as "Z97". The station started off commercial free and was initially a ratings success, but by the early 80s, the format's doldrums had caught up with the station.

=== Rock/Top 40 era ===
Randy James, known on air as "Christopher Haze", became the program director of the station in August 1980, and changed the call letters and imaging of the station as "Eagle 97" on January 20, 1981, with a hybrid Album Rock/Top 40 format. The original morning show was "The Rude Awakening Morning Show", consisting of Billy Hayes, Rose Wright and "The Rude Moose" (a character voiced by Hayes).

Stevens and Pruett, future morning DJs at KLOL in Houston, were the next morning show hosts from February 1982 to March 28, 1986. Stevens and Pruett were replaced with Paul Robbins, Paul Kinney, and Phil Cowan. James Smith "Moby" Carney was added to the lineup as the afternoon drive jock on September 1, 1986. DJs from the earlier era of KEGL included Drew Pierce, Charlie "Doc" Morgan, Danny Owen, Jonathan Doll, Dave Cooley, Jimmy Steal, Anthony "Tony Paraquat" Johnson, Jimmy White (1980–84; hosted an afternoon talk show on the station called "Relationships", during 1981–82), Sharon Golihar-Wilson (who hosted the evening show "House Party"), Lisa Traxler (who went on to work at Boston's WBCN), Russ Martin (who hosted a late Sunday night talk program), and Martha Martinez reported news during Stevens and Pruett's program.

David "Kidd Kraddick" Cradick (who would go on to greater success at now-sister station KHKS) started his career as KEGL's night DJ in 1984, then moved to afternoon drive on October 20, 1986, when "Moby in the Morning" replaced RKC, who left to do mornings in Sacramento. (Cradick used his real first name, Dave, for a time between 1989 and 1991. He was also known for a regular segment, "Burn Your Buns," where a fake threatening telephone call was placed to a specific unsuspecting person, by a listener's request.) Moby left KEGL on April 8, 1988, because of Federal Communications Commission's alleged violations of content. Cradick was then moved to mornings with "The Kidd Kraddick and Company Morning Show"; the show debuted on April 11, 1988. Rusty Humphries was briefly a personality for KEGL in the 1990s, known for his attempt to "smuggle" toy weapons into the Dallas/Fort Worth International Airport as an on-air stunt.

Through most of the 1980s, the station was owned by Sandusky, a newspaper company. The studios were located in the Xerox Tower at 222 West Las Colinas Blvd. in Las Colinas, a commercial district in the Dallas suburb of Irving. (The station had been located at 4801 West Freeway in Fort Worth under the original KFJZ-FM and KWXI tenures, then at 5915 West Pioneer Parkway in Arlington during the second incarnation of KFJZ.)

=== CHR/Rock era ===
Responding to KTKS-FM's format change from oldies to Top 40/CHR, KEGL changed to a rock-leaning Top 40/CHR format on September 12, 1984, and altered its moniker from Eagle 97 KEGL to All Hit 97.1 KEGL, The Eagle. KEGL's program director at the time was Joel Folger. In early 1986, KEGL began adding a minimal amount of mainstream pop titles. Later into the third part of the decade, the station also added a minimal amount of upbeat rhythmic titles in addition to the primary rock material the station was known for. However, KEGL would shift back to a rock-lean in 1989, but would return to mainstream Top 40/CHR the following year in 1990; during this time, KEGL competed with KHYI ("Y95").

On June 15, 1992, KEGL program director Donna Fadal decided to make changes to the station. After being jockless for most of the summer (and stunting with a weekend of Eagles songs), KEGL relaunched with a rock-leaning Top 40/CHR format, while retaining the "Eagle" branding. In July 1993, KEGL shifted to active rock, again while retaining the "Eagle" branding. KEGL also hired former Z Rock jock Madd Maxx Hammer for afternoons.

=== The first active rock era ===
KEGL was a Howard Stern affiliate from September 8, 1992, to July 26, 1997. This ended when he criticized the new ownership, Nationwide, an insurance company, on the air. In August 1997, Russ Martin took over the morning show. Within six months, "The Russ Martin Show" had returned the morning program to its No. 1 ranking in the Adults 25–54 and Men 25–54 demographics. In late 1999, Jacor, which had bought the Nationwide Communications chain of stations in mid-1997, was bought by Clear Channel Communications (forerunner to iHeartMedia). Martin quit KEGL on March 15, 2000, after co-host Rich Berra had been hired and Martin did not like him. In addition, Martin had been offered to host mornings on Infinity Broadcasting's KLLI.

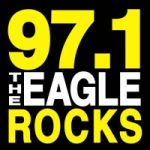
97.1 The Eagle logo used from 2000 to 2004

Another controversial show that aired on KEGL was Kramer and Twitch (hosted by Keith Kramer and Tony "Twitch" Longo) in evenings, who had started on KEGL's sister station KDMX, but were moved to the rock formatted KEGL because they were more suited for that genre. In 2001, a prank was aired on the show stating that Britney Spears was dead in an accident, to the horror of her fans. The phony report, which made it around the world in less than 24 hours (being reported on Australian news reports), also falsely stated that her then-boyfriend, Justin Timberlake, was critically injured in the wreck. Trouble followed, including hundreds of calls to local law enforcement agencies, and Kramer and Twitch were fired from KEGL. Both would go their separate ways as they ventured into other markets.

One week later, some motorists in the Dallas–Fort Worth Metroplex were outraged over a billboard promoting the station that was entitled "Highway to Hell", a reference to the AC/DC song of the same name. The billboard, which was erected on a major Dallas thoroughfare, featured Satan giving a lethal injection to Oklahoma City bombing suspect Timothy McVeigh, who was executed just days before the billboard went up.

At one point during this time period, a DJ allegedly fed a rabbit to a snake on the air.

=== As Sunny and La Preciosa (2004–2007) ===
A decision was made to eliminate the rock format on KEGL as Clear Channel also owned similarly formatted KDGE. At 5 p.m. on May 18, 2004, the first "Eagle" era came to an end after 23 years, as KEGL flipped to a gold-based adult contemporary format, branded as "Sunny 97.1". This move was possibly done in response to similarly formatted KMEO (now KTCK-FM) flipping to Modern/Texas Country music at the time. The final song on "The Eagle" was "Eagles Fly" by Sammy Hagar, while the first song on "Sunny" was "Here Comes the Sun" by The Beatles. Competing head-on with longtime adult contemporary radio station KVIL-FM and sharing an audience with KLUV-FM, "Sunny" had poor ratings during its tenure. (Previously, from 1992 to 1996, the "Sunny" branding was once used on KSNN-FM (now KWRD-FM) as a classic country station.) Mornings were hosted by former rock-formatted jock "Fast" Eddie Coyle; he was later teamed with Anna Deharo. Other jocks included Stacey James, Jeff Thomas, Dave Mason, and Steve Knoll.

On August 25, 2005, KEGL became "La Preciosa", a Spanish-language oldies format. "Sunny" morning show co-host Anna Deharo was held over for the new format. With several other Spanish stations in the market, "La Preciosa" did not live up to expectations.

=== The Eagle returns ===
"La Preciosa" dropped its Spanish format and began stunting with a commercial-free Christmas music format at midnight on December 1, 2007. Clear Channel announced that KEGL would return to an English-language format after the holiday season, but kept the new format secret to keep listeners guessing. At 10 a.m. on December 18, 2007, "The Eagle" was relaunched, with the first song on the revived format being "Flying High Again" by Ozzy Osbourne. On January 7 and 8, 2008, KEGL simulcast The Lex and Terry Show from KDGE. On January 9, The Lex and Terry Show moved its flagship station from KDGE to KEGL. Former mid-day host Chris Ryan was brought on as afternoon drive host and program director. Former KEGL jock Cindy Scull was rehired in 2008 to host a live weekend shift.

On April 27, 2009, KEGL lost a competitor when Cumulus Media's KDBN flipped to adult album alternative. In response to the flip of KDBN, KEGL adjusted its format to mainstream rock, with a heavy emphasis on rock music from its 1980s heyday.

On January 8, 2010, KEGL briefly changed its name to "97.1 The Bird", replacing the Eagle name as a stunt. The change was made just before the Dallas Cowboys hosted the Philadelphia Eagles in the NFC Wild Card playoffs, and the station did not want to be associated with the Eagles name. The station reverted to "97.1 The Eagle" the next day.

On January 20, 2010, station management announced that morning show hosts Lex & Terry would be replaced beginning January 21. Cindy Scull, who had held the evening shift on the station, was moved to mornings "on an interim basis" while the morning show underwent retooling that would "involve playing more music". The station also added Saturday morning programming with John Clay Wolfe at this time.

On July 1, 2010, KEGL announced the return of The Russ Martin Show. The show began airing on July 12, 2010, in the 6 am – 10 a.m. time slot. On September 26, 2011, KEGL rearranged the lineup to move The Russ Martin Show to the afternoon shift, while mid-day host Cindy Scull moved to mornings. Chris Ryan, the previous afternoon shift host, moved to middays.

On May 7, 2012, KEGL moved Sixx Sense with Nikki Sixx from evenings to mornings, while the previous morning show hosted by Cindy Scull moved to evenings. The rest of the KEGL lineup remained unchanged. On May 6, 2013, the station's lineup reverted to its previous lineup from mornings to evenings, with Cindy Scull returning to mornings, Russ Martin on afternoon drive time, and Sixx Sense back to evenings.

On September 3, 2016, The John Clay Wolfe Show moved from KEGL to sister station KZPS after it had a stint.

On November 17, 2016, after sister station KDGE dropped its longtime alternative format in favor of mainstream AC, KEGL began incorporating more alternative artists into its playlist normally not played on active rock stations, including Imagine Dragons and Twenty One Pilots. As a result, this left KEGL as the lone mainstream rock station in the Dallas-Ft. Worth market, until the alternative format returned to the market a year later when KVIL dropped their Top 40/CHR format.

On August 23, 2021, multiple reports indicated that KEGL would become the new flagship station of the Dallas Mavericks basketball team's game broadcasts starting with the 2021–22 season. Previously, Mavericks games were broadcast on KESN for 20 years.

=== Hot talk and sports as The Freak ===
On September 25, 2022, it was reported that KEGL would soon drop the "Eagle" branding and rock format and relaunch as a hybrid hot talk and sports station as "97.1 The Freak". Dallas Mavericks play-by-play and afternoon hosts Ben and Skin would remain with the station. The remainder of the new format's lineup would feature hosts formerly employed by the market's existing sports stations, including Mike Rhyner (he would come out of retirement to join the station after abruptly retiring from KTCK, having been one of the founding hosts of their format, in January 2020; the branding of the format is based on his longtime on-air nickname), as well as fellow former KTCK hosts Julie Dobbs and Jeff Cavanaugh, formerly of KRLD-FM.

Ahead of the move, "Eagle" late afternoon hosts Dan O'Malley and Alfie Coy (and, by extension, their show "The Treehouse"), as well as Dallas Region President Kelly Kibler, were let go, and KEGL/KZPS program director Don Davis had resigned earlier in the month. The change also comes due to the station's poor rating performance, with KEGL being ranked 28th in the Dallas-Fort Worth market with a 1.3 share in the August 2022 PPM rating report.

On September 30, at 2 p.m., midday host Alan Ayo signed off the music portion of the "Eagle" format, with the final songs played being "Hurt" by Johnny Cash, "Everlong" by Foo Fighters, and "Fade to Black" by Metallica. At 5 p.m., following that day's broadcast of "The Ben and Skin Show", the station began stunting with a loop of songs with the word "Freak" in their titles, specifically Missy Elliott's "Get Ur Freak On", Rick James' "Super Freak", "Freaks Come Out at Night" by Whodini, and Chic's "Le Freak". Liners advised listeners to tune in the following Monday (October 3) at 3 p.m., as well as redirected former "Eagle" rock music listeners to the station's HD2 subchannel (where the format would move), as well as co-owned classic rock station KZPS. The stunt was followed by a 15-hour loop of "The Waiting" by Tom Petty & the Heartbreakers on October 3.

The shift to "The Freak" took place on October 3 at 3 p.m.. Weekday local hosts included Jeff Cavanaugh, Kevin 'KT' Turner, Julie Dobbs, Matt Cather, Ben Rogers, Jeff "Skin" Wade, Krystina "K-Ray" Ray, Mike Rhyner, Mike Sirois and Michael 'Grubes' Gruber. Later, the station added another KTCK personality, Danny "Dingu" Balis. Other programs and hosts include "The News Junkie" (from Orlando sister station WTKS), "The Greg Peterson Experience", Cole Thompson, “Inside Sports Medicine”, “The Automotive Edge Radio Show”, “Saturday Sportsworld”, “Bloomberg Business of Sports”, "What The Freak Just Happened?!", VSiN Radio, and SportsMap Network programming. The station would add North Texas Mean Green football broadcasts starting in the 2023 season.

=== The Eagle flies high yet again ===
On April 26, 2024, ahead of the station's broadcast of Game 3 of the Mavericks' playoff series against the Los Angeles Clippers, radio news outlet RadioInsight reported the entire staff of KEGL was notified they would be dismissed earlier in the morning and the station would change formats once again. That day, the Ben and Skin Show would run a "best-of" program before abruptly switching over midway through to a broadcast of The News Junkie.

Mike Rhyner would confirm his dismissal later that day, admitting on X that the format was, in his opinion, an "unwinnable fight", then blaming the failure of the format, in an interview he did with the Dallas Observer, on a lack of local interest on the part of iHeartMedia, claiming the company quickly realized they were unable, or outright unequipped, to handle such a format as a national company. The format, indeed, had failed to impact the market since its launch, hovering in the low-1 range in the Nielsen Audio market ratings, including a 1.3 in both the February and March books.

It was believed, and would be seemingly confirmed by the article in the Observer that Rhyner was interviewed for, that the station would flip back to a rock-based format and revive the "Eagle" branding for a third time, as iHeart reclaimed the 971TheEagle.com web domain the previous week, after the domain had been owned by a domain squatter after the previous move.

On April 28, 2024, following the end of Game 4 of the Mavericks series, the station began stunting with random rock music sound clips and cryptic liners stating the station was "now flying" over certain Metroplex neighborhoods and cities (punctuated with occasional eagle screeches), announcing a change for the following day, the 29th, at 10 a.m.. At that time, the station flipped back to a mainstream rock format, officially reviving "97.1 The Eagle" again. Metallica, just as they had signed off the format in 2022, launched the format again, with the first song under the revived "Eagle" being their "Master of Puppets".

== Play-by-play ==
- University of North Texas Mean Green football, starting in the 2023 college football season.

== Former Play-by-Play Rights ==
- Dallas Mavericks of the National Basketball Association, from the 2021-22 season to 2026. Chuck Cooperstein and former Mavericks great Brad Davis are the game announcers with Mike Peasley hosting the pregame and postgame shows. The play-by-play rights has since then moved to Audacy-owned sports station 105.3 KRLD-FM.

== HD Radio ==
=== KEGL-HD2 ===
The station's HD2 sub-channel previously aired a commercial-free version of "The Eagle". In 2011, it began carrying iHeartRadio's "Slippery When Wet", a station airing classic metal music. As of summer 2019, "Slippery When Wet" was discontinued and replaced by "The Breeze", a soft adult contemporary format formerly on KEGL's HD3 spot. In May 2022, KEGL-HD2's signal was silenced with no programming replacement.

On September 30, 2022, KEGL's HD2 was reactivated to carry a continuation of the station's former active rock format as "97.1 HD2 the Eagle".

On April 29, 2024, after KEGL reverted to its previous active rock format and "The Eagle" branding, KEGL-HD2 flipped to alternative rock, reviving "The Edge" branding that was previously heard on KDGE at 94.5 FM from June 1989 until November 2000, then 102.1 FM from November 2000 until November 2016, and on KDGE's HD2 subchannel from April 2018 until December 2023.

=== KEGL-HD3 ===
Sometime in late 2018, KEGL launched an HD3 subchannel, carrying iHeartRadio's "The Breeze" format of soft adult contemporary music. "The Breeze" later moved to KEGL's HD2 subchannel, leaving KEGL-HD3 with no programming replacement.
