= Black Information Network =

American radio network

- Type: Radio network
- Country: United States

Programming
- Language(s): English
- Format: All news African-American culture

Ownership
- Owner: iHeartMedia

History
- Launch date: June 30, 2020

Coverage
- Availability: National, through online, HD Radio, and broadcast affiliates (see stations)
- Affiliates: 60 affiliates in 49 markets

Links
- Webcast: Listen live (via iHeartRadio)
- Website: www.binnews.com

Black Information Network (BIN) is a radio network and content brand owned by iHeartMedia. Launched on June 30, 2020, it is an all-news radio network of stations targeting African American communities, carrying mostly important national news headline stories as well as current events and special interest features. Some stations also incorporate local news, traffic, weather, and sports updates into the network feed. Tony Coles is the network's president and Tanita Myers was the network's first news director. Since January 2025 the team has been led by Vice President of News and Content Terry Foxx.

== History ==
On June 29, 2020, 15 iHeartMedia radio stations in markets with large African American populations (including AM, FM, and HD Radio subchannel stations) ceased their regular programming, and began stunting with clips of speeches by prominent African Americans, such as Malcolm X's "The Ballot or the Bullet" address, interspersed with messages stating that "our side of the story is about to be told", and promoting a major change in their programming at 12:00 PM EDT the next day.

On June 30, 2020, at 12:00 PM EDT (9:00 AM PDT), iHeartMedia officially launched the Black Information Network (BIN) on the 15 stunting stations, carrying national news coverage catered to African American communities. The service draws from other iHeartMedia services for local traffic and weather updates, and promotes podcasts oriented towards the audience. The network will be carried by additional stations over time, and is also being distributed on the iHeartRadio streaming platform.

BIN also serves as the provider of news content for iHeartMedia stations carrying formats that predominantly target African-Americans, including hip hop, R&B, and gospel. Stations not owned by iHeart may also subscribe to the service, with newscasts available at the :00 and :30 marks each hour.

Alongside traditional advertising, BIN is also being backed by a group of "national founding partners", including Bank of America, CVS Health, GEICO, Lowe's, McDonald's, Sony, 23andMe, and Verizon Communications, which will air outreach towards African-American communities on the network. Currently, the number of minutes each hour devoted to commercials is considerably lower than most radio networks.

On September 10, 2020, iHeartMedia announced that it would acquire WWRL in New York City, a station that had historically carried formats serving the African American community, to carry BIN beginning November 2. BIN programming was previously available in the New York radio market via 105.1 WWPR-FM's third HD Radio subchannel. On December 2, 2020, iHeartMedia announced that it would acquire Fort Worth's KHVN and its simulcast partner KKGM, with an intent for them to be BIN's stations in the Dallas-Fort Worth market, replacing their existing Black Gospel format.

In October 2025, iHeartMedia announced that it would begin syndicating BIN via its subsidiary Premiere Networks beginning November 1, making its programming available to third-party stations on a market exclusive basis for either the network’s hourly newscasts, airing in certain dayparts, or as a 24/7 format alongside iHeart’s stations.

== Stations ==
The network currently has 60 affiliates in 49 markets across the United States.

=== iHeartMedia owned & operated ===
Callsign	Frequency	Band	City	State	Network status
W257DS	99.3	FM	Montgomery	Alabama	n/a (WMRK-HD2 relay)
WDXB-HD2*	102.5-2	FM	Pelham (Birmingham)	Alabama	Affiliate
WHTY	1460	AM	Phenix City (Columbus)	Alabama (Georgia)	Affiliate
WMRK-HD2	107.9	FM	Shorter (Montgomery)	Alabama	Affiliate
W224CK	92.7	FM	Vestavia Hills (Birmingham)	Alabama	n/a (WDXB-HD2 relay)
KFOO	1440	AM	Riverside	California	Affiliate
KKSF	910	AM	Oakland-San Francisco	California	Affiliate
KRRL-HD2*	92.3-2	FM	Los Angeles	California	Affiliate
KSSX-HD2*	95.7-2	FM	Carlsbad (San Diego)	California	Affiliate
WUST	1120	AM	Washington	District of Columbia	Affiliate
WMZQ-HD2*	98.7-2	FM	Washington	District of Columbia	Affiliate
WJBT-HD2*	93.3-2	FM	Callahan (Jacksonville)	Florida	Affiliate
W281AM	104.1	FM	Macclenny (Jacksonville)	Florida	n/a (WJBT-HD2 relay)
WXBN	880	AM	Sweetwater (Miami)	Florida	Affiliate
WBIN	640	AM	Atlanta	Georgia	Affiliate
WYNF	1340	AM	Augusta	Georgia	Affiliate
WMGE	1670	AM	Dry Branch (Macon)	Georgia	Affiliate
W234BX	94.7	FM	Highland Pines (Columbus)	Georgia	n/a (WHTY relay)
W279AQ	103.7	FM	Mascoutah (St. Louis)	Illinois (Missouri)	n/a (KATZ-HD2 relay)
WVAZ-HD2*	102.7-2	FM	Oak Park (Chicago)	Illinois	Affiliate
WODT	1280	AM	New Orleans	Louisiana	Affiliate
K244FX	96.7	FM	New Orleans	Louisiana	n/a (WODT relay)
WWIN	1400	AM	Baltimore	Maryland	Affiliate
WJMN-HD2*	94.5-2	FM	Boston	Massachusetts	Affiliate
WDFN	1130	AM	Detroit	Michigan	Affiliate
KQQL-HD2*	107.9-2	FM	Anoka (Minneapolis)	Minnesota	Affiliate
W227BF	93.3	FM	Shoreview (Minneapolis)	Minnesota	n/a (KQQL-HD2 relay)
WSFZ	930	AM	Jackson	Mississippi	Affiliate
W251DB	98.1	FM	Jackson	Mississippi	n/a (WSFZ relay)
KJMS-HD2	101.1-2	FM	Olive Branch (Memphis)	Mississippi (Tennessee)	
WTUP	1490	AM	Tupelo	Mississippi	Affiliate
W299CS	107.7	FM	Tupelo	Mississippi	n/a (WTUP relay)
KATZ-HD2*	100.3-2	FM	Bridgeton (St. Louis)	Missouri	Affiliate
WWRL	1600	AM	New York City	New York	Affiliate
WWPR-HD3*	105.1-3	FM	New York City	New York	Affiliate
W254AZ	98.7	FM	Belmont (Charlotte)	North Carolina	n/a (WRFX-HD2 relay)
WRFX-HD2*	99.7-2	FM	Kannapolis (Charlotte)	North Carolina	Affiliate
WYTS	1230	AM	Columbus	Ohio	Affiliate
WCHD-HD2*	99.9-2	FM	Kettering (Dayton)	Ohio	Affiliate
WIZE	1340	AM	Springfield (Dayton)	Ohio	Affiliate
WTEL	610	AM	Philadelphia	Pennsylvania	Affiliate
WDAS-HD2*	105.3-2	FM	Philadelphia	Pennsylvania	Affiliate
WPRM-HD2*	99.1-2	FM	San Juan	Puerto Rico	Affiliate
W288CX	105.5	FM	Columbia	South Carolina	n/a (WXBT-HD2 relay)
WGVL	1440	AM	Greenville	South Carolina	Affiliate
WXBT-HD2	100.1	FM	West Columbia	South Carolina	Affiliate
WNRQ-HD2*	105.9-2	FM	Nashville	Tennessee	Affiliate
W248BQ	97.5	FM	Nashville	Tennessee	n/a (WNRQ-HD2 relay)
KHVN	970	AM	Fort Worth (Dallas)	Texas	Affiliate
KKGM	1630	AM	Fort Worth (Dallas)	Texas	Affiliate
K237HD	95.3	FM	Fort Worth	Texas	n/a (KHVN relay)
KXYZ	1320	AM	Houston	Texas	Affiliate
W244AV	96.7	FM	Blacksburg	Virginia	n/a (WROV-HD2 relay)
WROV-HD2*	96.3-2	FM	Martinsville (Roanoke)	Virginia	Affiliate
WHBT-FM	92.1	FM	Moyock (Norfolk)	North Carolina (Virginia)	Affiliate
KHHO	850	AM	Tacoma-Seattle	Washington	Affiliate

- Asterisk (*) indicates HD Radio broadcast.
- Gray background indicates low-power FM translator.

== See also ==
- Black-appeal stations
