= KFXR (AM) =

Radio station in Dallas, Texas

- Dallas, Texas; United States
- Broadcast area: Dallas–Fort Worth metroplex
- Frequency: 1190 kHz
- Branding: Talk Radio 1190

Programming
- Format: Conservative talk radio
- Network: Fox News Radio
- Affiliations: Premiere Networks; Radio America; KDFW (local news and weather); FC Dallas; Texas Tech Red Raiders

Ownership
- Owner: iHeartMedia, Inc.; (iHM Licenses, LLC)
- Sister stations: KDGE; KDMX; KEGL; KHKS; KHVN; KKGM; KZPS

History
- First air date: November 9, 1947; 78 years ago
- Former call signs: KLIF (1947–1990); KLAF (1990); KYII (1990–1991); KUII (1991–1992); KGBS (1992–1995); KDFX (1995–1997); KOOO (1997–1998); KLUV (1998–2000); KJOI (2000–2001); KTRA (2001)
- Call sign meaning: Fox Sports Radio (former station format)

Technical information
- Licensing authority: FCC
- Facility ID: 25375
- Class: B
- Power: 50,000 watts (day); 5,000 watts (night)
- Transmitter coordinates: 32°47′10.5″N 96°57′1″W (day); 32°53′57.4″N 96°24′47.9″W (night)

Links
- Public license information: Public file; LMS
- Webcast: Listen live (via iHeartRadio)
- Website: 1190talkradio.iheart.com

KFXR (1190 kHz) is a commercial AM radio station in Dallas, Texas, and serving the Dallas–Fort Worth metroplex. It is owned by iHeartMedia and airs a Conservative talk radio format. Its studios and offices are located along Dallas Parkway in Farmers Branch (with a Dallas address).

KFXR is a Class B station. By day, it is powered at 50,000 watts, the maximum for commercial AM stations. Its daytime transmitter is in Irving, using a directional antenna with a four-tower array. At night, to avoid interfering with other stations on 1190 AM, it reduces power to 5,000 watts. Its nighttime transmitter is in Rockwall, using a twelve-tower array directional antenna.

== Programming ==
While it is owned by iHeartMedia, KFXR does not have access to two of the most popular talk programs syndicated by iHeart's Premiere Networks. The Sean Hannity Show and Coast to Coast AM with George Noory are found on KLIF (570 AM). KFXR does carry three Premiere Networks weekday talk shows, The Glenn Beck Radio Program, The Clay Travis and Buck Sexton Show and The Jesse Kelly Show. Weekday programs from other syndicators include This Morning, America's First News with Gordon Deal, The Dana Loesch Show, The Joe Pags Show and The Michael Berry Show based at co-owned KTRH Houston.

Paid brokered programming shows are heard on weekends, as well as syndicated programs including The High-Tech Texan Show with Michael Garfield, Armstrong & Getty, The Pet Show with Warren Eckstein and Tom Gresham's Gun Talk. Live sports include Texas Tech Red Raiders football and men's basketball, along with FC Dallas soccer games. World and national news from Fox News Radio starts most hours, while local news is provided by Fox television station KDFW.

== History ==
=== Early years ===
The station signed on the air on November 9, 1947. Its first call sign was KLIF.

The station was owned by Trinity Broadcasting, with studios in a 12th floor penthouse apartment in Cliff Towers. At first it was a daytimer, powered at 1,000 watts and sign off at sunset each night. By the early 1950s, it got a power boost to 5,000 watts by day and 1,000 watts at night. 7777

=== Top 40 KLIF era ===
KLIF achieved recognition in radio broadcasting through the efforts of noted programmer Gordon McLendon. The station became Dallas' and one of the nation's biggest top 40 radio stations. It virtually defined the hit music format for 1950s and 1960s top 40 radio, reaching an over 50 share in the Dallas ratings, an unparalleled ratings success.

In 1954, KLIF switched from a varied music and talk format to one that focused on hit songs with periodic news. McLendon collected the names of local leaders in business and government, and worked them into news on the station. McLendon said there were only two things that radio could compete with television on, "music and news". KLIF was headquartered at KLIF Triangle Point Studios from 1964 to 1980. It is a street front building with large windows where pedestrians and Downtown Dallas shoppers could look in the studio and see the action of live broadcasts. KLIF was known for its promotions which included top 40 surveys with photo shoots of the disc jockeys. Other photos showed the broadcast staff at live promotion events. KLIF hosted live music shows in different parts of Dallas. The announcers often toured the city in KLIF radio vehicles.

When top 40 music listening switched from AM to FM during the late 1970s, the station lost its dominance in the format and later switched to talk radio. Daytime power was boosted to 50,000 watts in 1959, from a new four tower site in Irving. Nights continued from the five tower site on Scheme Road in south-east Dallas. In 1968, a complicated antenna system (12 towers to protect other stations on AM 1190) was built near Rockwall, Texas. In 1990, the KLIF call letters and talk format were moved to 570 AM, with AM 1190 being bought by Greystone Broadcasting.

=== Switch to news ===
A temporary automated format of CNN Headline News was put on AM 1190 along with the call letters KLAF while Greystone built new studios and planned a new approach. Greystone added local news in the morning and afternoon drive time along with syndicated talk shows, including Bruce Williams and Larry King, to the Headline News format, changing the call sign to KYII - "Keeping You Instantly Informed". KHYI, a popular FM top 40 station at the time (now KLTY), protested the AM station's call letters, saying they were too similar to KHYI. Because of this, Greystone agreed to change to KUII in 1991. That same year, KUII added the Rush Limbaugh show to the lineup; it had previously aired on weekend afternoons on KLIF. Limbaugh quickly became the sole ratings hit on KUII. In the summer of 1992, the station hired a local psychologist to do a talk show in the morning and added an afternoon sports talk show with former Dallas Cowboys player Tony Hill.

=== Former KLIF 1190 announcers ===
Gordon McLendon, Jimmy Rabbitt, Paxton Mills, Ralph Baker Jr., Charlie Van Dyke, Michael O'Shea, Dick Heatherton, Chuck Murphy, Dave Ambrose, Jim Tabor, Mike Selden, Ron Chapman, Johnny Dark, Hal Martin, Ken Dowe, Rod Roddy, Cuzzin Lennie, Wes Wise, Bob McCord, Brant Miller, John London, Randy Robbins, Russ Knight, Jim O'Brian, Chuck Dunaway, Ken Knox, Dick Kemp, Dick McCurdy, Jack Woods, Don Keys, Barry Kaye, Bill Stewart, Don Keyes, Buddy McGregor, George Michael, Deano Day, Gary Mack, Don Berns, Ken Reed, Stan Richards, Larry Wilson, Rex Miller, Mike Scott, Don McGregor, Lee Douglas, Jay Lawrence, Bill Ennis, Don Robertson, Bill Robbins, Gary Hamilton, Van Winkle, Coyote, Tony Booth, Gary Owens, Rex Jones and Brice Armstrong, Jack Murray, Nick Alexander, Randy Robbins, Jim Davis, Paxton Mills, Cat Simon, Truckin' Tom Kent.

=== As KGBS ===
In the latter part of 1992, the station lost Limbaugh's program to WBAP. To make up for the loss, the station hired Ron Engelman to do a midday talk show. Larry King's syndicated talk show moved to afternoons. It was about this time that Morton Downey Jr. brought his syndicated radio show to Dallas and hosted it out of the station. (He took a stake in station ownership for a time as well). It changed call letters to KGBS "Great B-S" and called itself "Hot Talk 1190 KGBS".

Ron Engelman's show gained a little traction and he developed a devoted, but small, following. Among the people listening were the Branch Davidians in Waco, about 85 miles south of Dallas. When the 1993 standoff with the Davidians took place, Engelman found out they were listening and got them to put banners out a window. His show was devoted to the standoff almost every day until the fiery end. He had calls from all over the world from family members of people still in the compound. At least two sect members came out of the compound and surrendered after family members were interviewed on Engelman's show. At one point, Engelman tried to get into the compound, but was turned back by the FBI. Engelman continued to devote most of his show to the Davidians and the aftermath of the fire for weeks after it happened. Station management was not happy with this and Engelman ultimately announced his departure - to the surprise of management - at the end of a show.

Downey remained at the station for another year or so before moving on, eventually hosting a national weekday television show.

=== As KDFX ===
In 1995, Greystone sold the station to Salem Broadcasting, which owns religious radio stations around the U.S. Salem changed the call letters to KDFX and programmed a conservative talk radio format, now heard on KSKY. In early 1997, Salem bought an FM station at 94.9 from CBS and gave CBS the 1190 frequency as part of the deal.

=== As KOOO ===
When the switch to CBS ownership took place, the station's call letters were changed to KOOO. First airing October 30, 1996, CBS programmed "Talk 1190" with a syndicated talk radio format including Don Imus, Dr. Joy Browne, Tom Leykis, and Opie & Anthony heard weekdays.

=== As KLUV ===
On August 28, 1998, KOOO dropped the talk radio format for oldies, switching to a simulcast of then-sister station KLUV and adopting the KLUV call letters. On September 11 of that year, KLUV (AM) flipped to "Smokin' Oldies", playing 1950s and 1960s hits, many of them no longer heard on the FM station's format. In 2000, Radio One acquired this station from CBS. The call sign changed to KJOI. It was to become a Christian radio station, but the format change never took place and Radio One quickly sold the station.

=== As KTRA ===
In September 2001, the station was acquired by Clear Channel Communications (now known as iHeartMedia) from Radio One for $13 million. The license was transferred by Clear Channel to Capstar Texas Limited Partnership (a subsidiary of Clear Channel) the same day. After a short "stunt" playing the same song 24/7 for two weeks, the format was changed to a mostly local sports talk format as KTRA ("Xtra Sports 1190"). As the station began airing more syndicated sports shows from Fox Sports Radio, it switched its call sign to KFXR to reflect this affiliation.

=== As KFXR ===
"CNN 1190" logo prior to 2010.

Fox Sports Radio programming continued until late-March 2004, when the station switched to an all-Beatles format. In late May 2004, it returned to an oldies format as "Mighty 1190" just two months later. In 2005, the station switched to a country music format as "Lone Star 1190" and shifted to classic country as "Cowboy 1190" in February 2006. After four years of music, it once again switched formats to news/talk as "CNN 1190" on March 30, 2008. Programming included a simulcast of the audio of HLN (formerly CNN Headline News).

former logo

As HLN relied less on rolling news coverage and more on personality talk, KFXR's format changed from the network's simulcast back to classic country in December 2009. After several months, the station returned to a mix of talk and brokered shows. In January 2010, this lineup was to include a weekday evening show hosted by Jack E. Jett, but it was cancelled before it even aired, reportedly for Jett's choice of language while being interviewed by Robert Wilonsky for the Dallas Observer.

Initially retaining the "CNN 1190" branding, in early 2010, KFXR rebranded as simply "1190 AM" to reflect on the current format and affiliation. In July 2012, KFXR added Glenn Beck to the midday slot. Programming by this point consisted of an array of news, financial, lifestyle, and entertainment talk shows (mostly brokered) with syndicated talk programs from Glenn Beck and Jerry Doyle plus Coast to Coast AM with George Noory.

On November 14, 2014, KFXR said it would jettison its brokered "DFW 1190 AM" programming and return to talk as "Talk Radio 1190" on November 17, using programming already in iHeartMedia's portfolio. At this time, KFXR ceased its HD Radio digital stereo service.

On May 13, 2024, KFXR shifted its format to conservative talk and added Glenn Beck, Clay Travis and Buck Sexton to its program lineup.
