= KHVN =

Radio station in Fort Worth, Texas

Fort Worth, Texas; United States
- Broadcast area: Dallas–Fort Worth metroplex
- Frequency: 970 kHz
- Branding: Dallas-Fort Worth's BIN

Programming
- Language: English
- Format: Black-oriented news
- Affiliations: Black Information Network

Ownership
- Owner: iHeartMedia, Inc.; (iHM Licenses, LLC)
- Sister stations: KDGE; KDMX; KEGL; KFXR; KKGM; KHKS; KZPS

History
- First air date: December 6, 1946; 79 years ago
- Former call signs: KWBC (1946–1953); KNOK (1953–1982); KSAX (1982–1985)
- Call sign meaning: Heaven (former branding)

Technical information
- Licensing authority: FCC
- Facility ID: 63780
- Class: B
- Power: 1,000 watts (day); 270 watts (night)
- Transmitter coordinates: 32°47′56″N 97°17′44″W
- Translator: (95.3 MHz) K237HD (Fort Worth)

Links
- Public license information: Public file; LMS
- Webcast: Listen live (via iHeartRadio)
- Website: dallas.binnews.com

KHVN (970 AM) is a radio station licensed to Fort Worth, Texas, and serving the Dallas–Fort Worth metroplex, owned and operated by iHeartMedia, Inc. It airs an African American targeted all-news radio format, simulcast with co-owned KKGM 1630 AM, affiliates of the national Black Information Network.

By day, KHVN is powered at 1,000 watts. But to avoid interference with other stations on 970 AM, it reduces power to 270 watts at night. The transmitter is on Kimbo Road near Mesquite Road in Fort Worth. Programming is also heard on 150 watt FM translator K237HD in Fort Worth.

== History ==
=== Early years ===
This station started out as daytime-only KWBC on December 6, 1946. It had an Ethnic and Variety format with mostly local, amateur, and public service programming under the ownership of Associated Broadcasters. In 1950, J. Dean McClain joined the station with his hour-long Blues at Sunrise program. The blues music program proved to be quite popular and propelled McClain into station management.

By the late 1950s McClain was program director, and later was station manager and general manager. By 1953, most commercial billings were from Ethnic shows, so the owners reimaged the station as KNOK to serve an African American audience. By 1954, KNOK changed its format to R&B with some Country and Spanish language programming on weekends.

=== Urban programming ===
After 1957, KNOK became a full-time R&B station, the first station in the DFW area adopt that format exclusively. In the late 1960s, the African American Clay Smothers, who later served in the Texas House of Representatives, was the station news editor known for his conservative commentary.

In 1965, it added an FM sister station, 107.5 KNOK-FM (now KMVK). From that point until 1979, KNOK and KNOK-FM simulcast all programming. After sunset, the FM station continued with the R&B music format while the AM station was off the air. In 1979, KNOK transferred its R&B format to sister station KNOK-FM and changed its format to Jazz. Three years later, the station was renamed as KSAX (call sign to have stood for Saxophone) while maintaining its Jazz format before making its final switch to an Urban Gospel formatted station as KHVN in 1985 as Heaven 97.

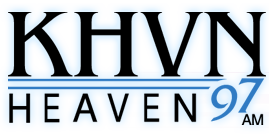
KHVN's logo used until 2020.

=== Expanded Band assignment ===
On March 17, 1997, the Federal Communications Commission (FCC) announced that eighty-eight stations had been given permission to move to newly available "Expanded Band" transmitting frequencies, ranging from 1610 to 1700 kHz, with KHVN authorized to move from 970 to 1630 kHz.

An application for the expanded band station, also licensed to Fort Worth, was filed in 1997. It was approved and issued a Construction Permit the next year that was assigned the call letters KBCM on March 6, 1998, which were changed to KOME on January 15, 1999, and to KNAX on March 20, 2001. The new station began regular service in July 2002, initially with a Spanish religious format as "Radio Christiana", and became KKGM in 2004.

The FCC's initial policy was that both the original station and its expanded band counterpart could operate simultaneously for up to five years, after which owners would have to turn in one of the two licenses, depending on whether they preferred the new assignment or elected to remain on the original frequency. However, this deadline has been extended multiple times, and both stations have remained authorized. One policy the FCC has generally enforced is that the original stations and their expanded band counterparts must remain under common ownership, so in subsequent ownership transfers KHVN and KKGM have been paired together.

=== Acquisition by iHeartMedia, Black Information Network ===
On December 2, 2020, iHeartMedia announced its purchase of KHVN and KKGM (including its translators, K221GV (92.1 MHz) and K237HD (95.3 MHz)) from Mortenson Broadcasting for $950,000. This included a Local marketing agreement (LMA) that took effect on January 2, 2021, continuing until full consummation. The purchase allowed iHeartMedia to max out its DFW cluster threshold of allowable station holdings. Days later, it was further announced that these stations are to become affiliates of the Black Information Network, effectively eliminating KHVN's long-time gospel format.

On January 2, 2021, the stations began stunting with African American speeches, interspersed with messages such as "Our Voices Will Be Heard" and "Our side of the story is about to be told," with the new Black Information Network (BIN) format officially launching on January 4 at 12:00 noon. This new format competes with Audacy's heritage all-news station KRLD. The purchase was consummated on March 31, 2021.
