= KKGM =

Radio station in Fort Worth, Texas

Simulcasts KHVN 970 Fort Worth

Fort Worth, Texas; United States
- Broadcast area: Dallas–Fort Worth metroplex
- Frequency: 1630 kHz
- Branding: Dallas' BIN

Programming
- Format: Black-oriented news
- Affiliations: Black Information Network

Ownership
- Owner: iHeartMedia; (iHM Licenses, LLC)
- Sister stations: KDGE; KDMX; KEGL; KFXR; KHKS; KHVN; KZPS

History
- First air date: 2002; 24 years ago
- Former call signs: KBCM (1998–1999); KOME (1999–2001); KNAX (2001–2004)
- Call sign meaning: Kingdom's Key to Gospel music (former format)

Technical information
- Licensing authority: FCC
- Facility ID: 87147
- Class: B
- Power: 10,000 watts (day); 1,000 watts (night)
- Transmitter coordinates: 32°48′36″N 97°07′26″W
- Translator: (97.5 MHz) K248DS (Fort Worth)

Links
- Public license information: Public file; LMS
- Webcast: Listen live (via iHeartRadio)
- Website: dallas.binnews.com

KKGM (1630 AM) is a commercial radio station licensed to Fort Worth, Texas, and serving the Dallas–Fort Worth metroplex. The station simulcasts an African American-targeted news format along with sister station KHVN 970 AM. KKGM and KHVN are affiliates of the Black Information Network (BIN) and are owned by iHeartMedia, Inc. The studios are along Dallas Parkway in Farmers Branch, using a Dallas address.

By day, KKGM is powered at 10,000 watts, non-directional. To protect other stations on 1630 AM from interference, at night power is reduced to 1,000 watts. The transmitter is on Trinity Boulevard at House Anderson Road in Fort Worth. Programming is also heard on FM translator K248DS at 97.5 MHz.

== History ==
=== Expanded Band ===
KKGM originated as the expanded band "twin" of an existing station on the standard AM band. On March 17, 1997, the Federal Communications Commission (FCC) announced that 88 stations had been given permission to move to newly available "expanded band" transmitting frequencies, ranging from 1610 to 1700 kHz. KHVN in Fort Worth was authorized to move from 970 to 1630 kHz.

An application for the new expanded band station was filed in 1997. It was issued a construction permit by the FCC the next year. This was assigned the call letters KBCM on March 6, 1998, which was changed to KOME on January 15, 1999, and to KNAX on March 20, 2001. The station began regular service in July 2002, initially with a Spanish religious format as "Radio Christiana".

The FCC's initial policy was that both the original station and its expanded band counterpart could operate simultaneously for up to five years, after which owners would have to turn in one of the two licenses, depending on whether they preferred the new assignment or elected to remain on the original frequency. However, this deadline has been extended multiple times, and both stations have remained authorized. One policy the FCC has generally enforced is that the original stations and their expanded band counterparts must remain under common ownership, so in subsequent sales the two stations have been paired together.

=== Gospel and Talk ===
KNAX applied for a move to Euless and for call letters KHEV. But it chose KKGM instead in 2004. It began airing a Southern Gospel format. KKGM later switched to an all-talk format in 2011 as "Better Life Radio" with a mix of Christian talk and teaching shows and conservative programming, including the controversial Alex Jones show. It changed back to a mix of Southern Gospel music along with some talk shows a year later.

Even though owners of expanded band stations were not supposed to continue owning and programming two radio stations, the new frequency and the original frequency, the FCC never ordered them to surrender one of their licenses. So 970 and 1630 continued to simulcast their programming, eventually airing an urban gospel format.

=== iHeart ownership ===
On December 2, 2020, iHeartMedia announced its purchase of KKGM and KHVN from Mortenson Broadcasting for $950,000. The deal included two FM translators, K221GV (92.1 MHz) and K237HD (95.3 MHz). A Local marketing agreement (LMA) was set up to allow iHeart to program the stations while the deal was being finalized. That took effect on January 2, 2021. The purchase allowed iHeartMedia to max out its DFW cluster threshold of the maximum stations it could legally own.

On December 24, iHeart announced that both stations would become affiliates of the Black Information Network on January 2, 2021, ending their urban gospel formats. The two stations would begin airing an iHeartMedia news service aimed at African-American listeners.

On January 2, 2021, KKGM (erroneously identified as "KKMG" during top of hour legal IDs) and KHVN began stunting. They played recorded speeches by prominent African-American leaders, interspersed with messages such as "Our voices will be heard" and "Our side of the story is about to be told." The new Black Information Network (BIN) format officially launched on January 4 at Noon. The purchases of KKGM and KHVN were consummated on March 31, 2021.
