= The Kidd Kraddick Morning Show =

American morning radio program

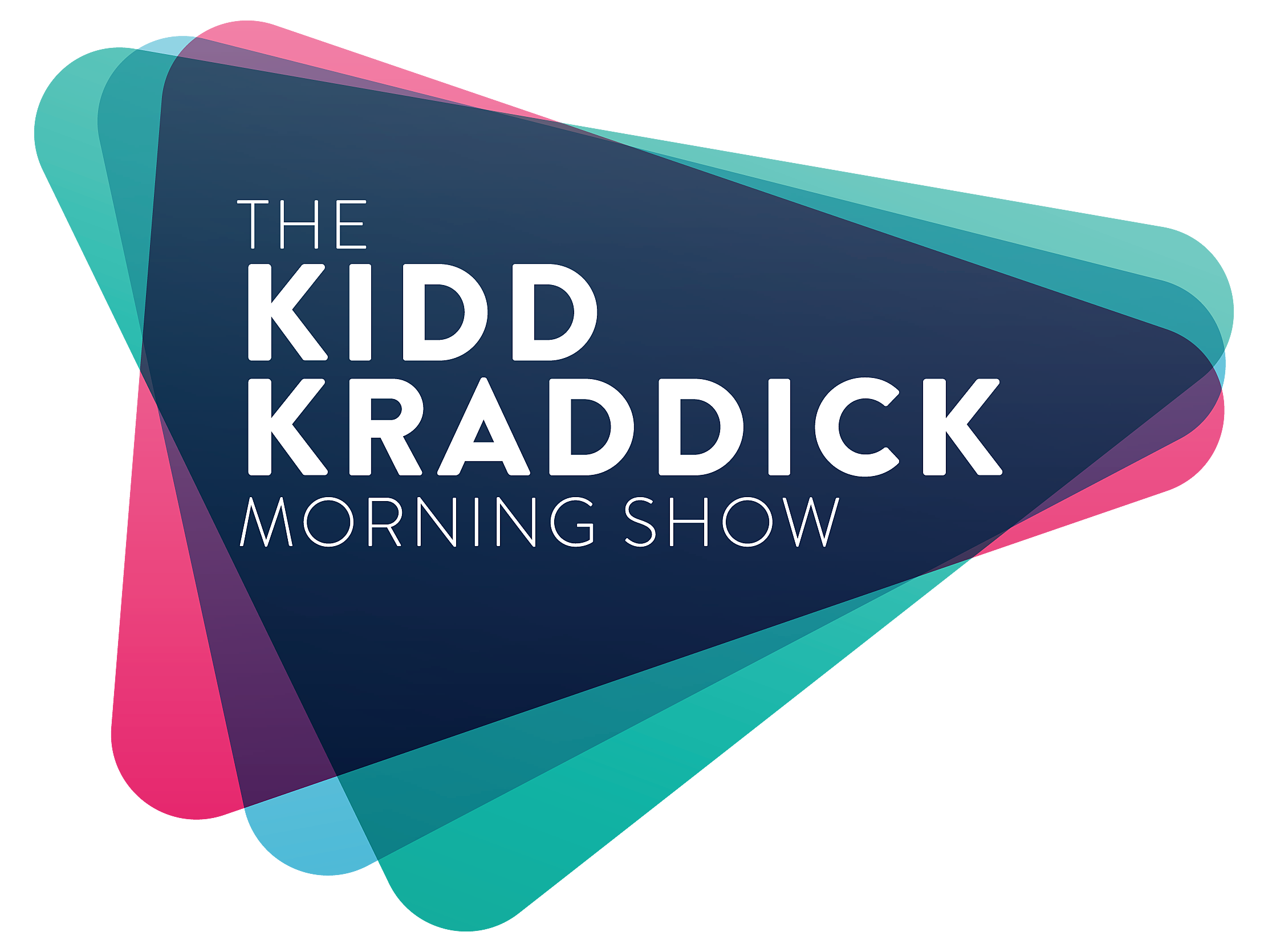
- Genre: Comedy, Talk, Entertainment
- Running time: Weekdays, 6–9 a.m. Central
- Country of origin: United States
- Home station: KHKS, 106.1 KISS-FM (Dallas, Texas)
- Syndicates: United Stations Radio Networks; YEA Media Group
- Starring: J-Si Chavez; Kellie Rasberry; Big Al Mack; Ana Szabo; Part-Time Justin; Audrey Allen
- Created by: Kidd Kraddick
- Original release: October 1, 1992
- Website: KiddNation.com
- Podcast: kPod

The Kidd Kraddick Morning Show (formerly Kidd Kraddick in the Morning) is an American ensemble morning radio show that originates from Dallas, Texas. The show is heard weekday mornings on flagship station, KHKS, and on dozens of other radio stations around the U.S., airing either a Top 40/CHR, Mainstream Adult Contemporary or Hot Adult Contemporary radio format.

The Kidd Kraddick Morning Show's primary focus is pop culture commentary, with discussions often revolving around the previous night's reality television programming, celebrity relationships and current affairs. The show is broadcast from their studios in Irving, Texas. The show is owned and syndicated by YEA Media Group, and distributed by United Stations Radio Networks. The Kidd Kraddick Morning Show is available in an on-demand service via the show's website, the iHeartRadio, and Spotify apps.

Some popular segments on the show include "Love Letters to Kellie", "First World Problems", "Does that Make Me Crazy?", "Worst Date Ever”, "Kellie's Entertainment Report", and "Ana's Group Chat".

On September 10, 2012, the show became a part of nationally syndicated Fox television show, Dish Nation, which mainly covers celebrity news as reported on several radio morning shows around the country. On December 16, 2016, the show announced a departure from Dish Nation, with a new TV project in the works. On July 30, 2018, KiddNation TV, premiered in a limited test run in both Dallas and Houston, Texas. The television show features some of the daily radio show's content and segments, as well as a look into some of the cast's daily life outside of the studio. KiddNation TV's test run ended on August 24, 2018, after airing a twenty-episode season.

From October 1, 1992, until July 26, 2013, the show was hosted by radio DJ and personality, Kidd Kraddick. But with Kraddick's unexpected death outside of New Orleans on July 27, 2013, the show's future without Kraddick was undetermined. On August 5, 2013, the show resumed live broadcasts as an ensemble program hosted by the remaining co-hosts, with the show continuing to posthumously carry Kraddick's name as The Kidd Kraddick Morning Show.

== Cast ==
=== Current ===
- Kellie Rasberry Evans (1994–present)
- Alaric "Big Al" Mack (1995–present)
- José "J-Si" Chavez (2006–present)
- Ana Szabo (2020–present)
- Michael Justin "Part-Time Justin" Chavez (2020–present)
- Audrey Allen (2026–present)

=== Staff ===
- Russ "Russ Face" Francis (2010–present)
- George "Boss Man" Laughlin (2011–present)
- Robert "White Cheddar" Ehrman (January 2008 – March 2014, April 2015 – present)
- Don "The Engineer" Wakefield (2015–present)

=== Former ===
- Kidd Kraddick (1992–2013)
- Jocelyn White (1992–1994)
- Tom Gribble (1995–1999)
- Bert Weiss (1996–1998)
- Shanon "Psycho Shanon" Murphy (1999–2019)
- Troy Hughes (2000–2007)
- Rich Shertenlieb (2000–2006)
- Scott Robb (2001–2004)
- Aaron "Cappy" Cappotelli (2006–2009)
- Taylor Glover (August 2006)
- Maria Todd (October 2006 – November 2006)
- Jenna Owens (2008–2020; was part-time 2020–2022)
- Nick Adams (2009–2023)
- Richard "Trey" Peart (2011–2026)
- Lacey Gee (2011–2023)
- Amy Nichols (2013–2022)
- Mike Morse (2014–2015)
- Elena Davies (2015–2017)
- Cami Henz (2018–2021)

== Affiliates ==
There are currently 52 affiliated stations airing The Kidd Kraddick Morning Show.

- KAAK—Great Falls, Montana
- KAFX—Lufkin, Texas
- KBBQ-FM—Fort Smith, Arkansas
- KBIU—Lake Charles, Louisiana
- KCDD—Abilene, Texas
- KELI—San Angelo, Texas
- KHDK—Burlington, Iowa
- KHKS—Dallas, Texas (flagship station)
- KKMX—Roseburg, Oregon
- KKPN—Corpus Christi, Texas
- KLJZ—Yuma, Arizona
- KMCK—Fayetteville, Arkansas
- KMMX—Lubbock, Texas
- KNIN-FM—Wichita Falls, Texas
- KODM—Odessa, Texas
- KOQL—Columbia, Missouri
- KOTM—Ottumwa, Iowa
- KPWW—Texarkana, Arkansas
- KMXJ—Amarillo, Texas
- KQVT—Victoria, Texas
- KQXT-FM—San Antonio, Texas
- KSNN—Montrose, Colorado
- KSKZ—Garden City, Kansas
- KSYN—Joplin, Missouri
- KTHC—Sidney, Montana
- KTIJ—Hobart, Oklahoma
- KTYL-FM—Tyler, Texas
- KVKI-FM—Shreveport, Louisiana
- KVRW—Lawton, Oklahoma
- KWPW—Waco, Texas
- KXFC—Ada, Oklahoma
- KZRZ— Monroe, Louisiana
- WAOR—Elkhart, Indiana
- WAEV—Savannah, Georgia
- WCBH—Terre Haute, Indiana
- WDOD-FM—Chattanooga, Tennessee
- WEZB—New Orleans, Louisiana
- WFMF—Baton Rouge, Louisiana
- WHAJ—Bluefield, West Virginia
- WIOL (AM)—Columbus, Georgia
- WJDQ—Meridian, Mississippi
- WQQB—Rantoul, Illinois
- WQGA—Brunswick, Georgia
- WQGN-FM—New London, Connecticut
- WREZ—Paducah, Kentucky
- WSIM—Florence, South Carolina
- WWKZ—Tupelo, Mississippi
- WWXM—Myrtle Beach, South Carolina
- WXYK—Pascagoula, Mississippi
- WYDS—Decatur, Illinois
- WYSS—Sault Ste. Marie, Michigan
- WZLK—Pikeville, Kentucky

== Awards ==
Kidd Kraddick received multiple awards due to his on-air personality and iconic talent. He was awarded the Billboard "Air Personality of the Year" Award three different times, received the 1992 and 1997 AWRO "Air Personality of the Year". Additionally, He also received radio's Marconi Award as major market radio personality of the year in 1998 and 2006. Kraddick was also named Best Radio Personality in the Country on national television via the first-ever Radio Music Awards in 1999. He later won the 2001 "Radio and Records CHR/Pop Personality/Show of the Year".

In 2007, the show was nominated for the Syndicated Personality/Show of the Year award by Radio & Records magazine. Other finalists included Delilah, Blair Garner, Steve Harvey, The Lia Show, and John Tesh.

In 2015, the radio show received The Kidd Kraddick Award at the TalentMaster's 27th annual Morning Show Boot Camp.
