= KHKS =

Radio station in Denton, Texas

- Denton, Texas; United States
- Broadcast area: Dallas–Fort Worth metroplex
- Frequency: 106.1 MHz (HD Radio)
- Branding: 106.1 KISS-FM

Programming
- Language: English
- Format: Contemporary hit radio
- Subchannels: HD2: Pride Radio (Top 40–EDM)
- Affiliations: iHeartRadio; Premiere Networks; United Stations Radio Networks

Ownership
- Owner: iHeartMedia; (iHM Licenses, LLC)
- Sister stations: KDGE; KDMX; KEGL; KFXR; KHVN; KKGM; KZPS

History
- First air date: June 1948
- Former call signs: KDNT-FM (1948–1980); KDDC (1980–1981); KIXK (1980–1984); KTKS (1984–1987); KOAI (1987–1992)
- Former frequencies: 106.3 MHz (1948–1962)
- Call sign meaning: Hits Kiss

Technical information
- Licensing authority: FCC
- Facility ID: 23084
- Class: C
- ERP: 100,000 watts
- HAAT: 508 meters (1,667 ft)
- Transmitter coordinates: 32°35′19″N 96°58′5″W

Links
- Public license information: Public file; LMS
- Webcast: Listen live (via iHeartRadio)
- Website: 1061kissfm.iheart.com

KHKS (106.1 FM) is a contemporary hit radio station licensed to Denton, Texas. Branded "KISS-FM" the station serves the Dallas–Fort Worth metroplex, and is owned by iHeartMedia. The station is flagship of the nationally syndicated The Kidd Kraddick Morning Show. Its studios are on Dallas Parkway in Farmers Branch.

KHKS has an effective radiated power (ERP) of 100,000 watts, the maximum for most U.S. FM stations. Its transmitter site is on West Belt Line Road in Cedar Hill.

== History ==
=== Early years ===
KDNT-FM was established in June 1948, on 106.3 MHz, and moved to its current frequency of 106.1 MHz in 1962. The station was a simulcast of KDNT (AM) during its early years. KDNT-FM went through a number of different formats during the late 1970s and early 1980s, including a Top 40/oldies hybrid, disco music, rock music, and country music. The station's calls changed to KDDC in 1980, and then to KIXK at the start of 1981. KIXK's format remained country (as "Kix 106") until changing to oldies/classic hits in December 1982.

=== The first "Kiss" era ===
In September 1984, KIXK flipped to Top 40/CHR as Kiss 106 FM, KTKS. At this time, 106.1 was owned by Capital Cities Communications until Gannett acquired KTKS in 1985 due to Capital Cities' acquisition of ABC, Inc.

=== 106.1 The Oasis ===
In late-June 1987, the station's CHR format began slowly leaning towards hot adult contemporary, retaining its Kiss branding under the slogan "The Fresh One". At midnight on September 30, 1987, KTKS began stunting with birds chirping and nature sounds. At noon the same day, the station flipped to new-age music–smooth jazz as KOAI "106.1 The Oasis". In October 1992, Gannett reached a deal with Granum Communications to move the smooth jazz format to 107.5 (now KMVK), where it remained until the fall of 2006.

=== The revived "Kiss FM" ===
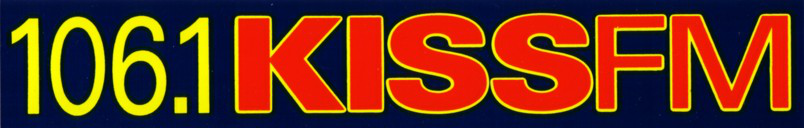
The first 106.1 Kiss FM logo used in the 1990s.

On November 1, 1992, at 1:11 am, the CHR/Top 40 format and "Kiss FM" branding were revived as 106.1 Kiss FM with the KHKS calls. The first song on the revived "Kiss FM" was Wilson Phillips' version of "The Star-Spangled Banner". Gannett would sell the station to Chancellor Broadcasting in April 1997; after a subsequent series of mergers and buyouts, KHKS came under the ownership of San Antonio-based Clear Channel Communications (now iHeartMedia,) in 2000. Since its launch, KHKS has been the flagship station of The Kidd Kraddick Morning Show, which began nationwide syndication in 2001.

From September 7–10, 2010, the station was slightly rebranded to "06.1 Kiss FM" (leaving out the first "1") as part of its $5,000 contest. That same year, KHKS ran a new initiative where they broadcast commercial free every Monday. However, during that time, they've been known to stretch a song out a little by repeating the chorus of a song twice.

From 2005 to 2009, KHKS was the only top 40 station in Dallas/Fort Worth, although it had always been leaning rhythmic since then, sharing audience with Rhythmic KZZA (106.7 FM) during that time. From 2009 to 2014, it was competing head-on with Cumulus Media-owned KLIF-FM (93.3), which leaned more adult CHR. In November 2014, KLIF-FM flipped to a classic hip-hop format for the holiday season before flipping to urban contemporary full-time, which left KHKS as the sole Top 40/CHR station in the Metroplex once again. KHKS, however, regained KLIF-FM as its competitor, as Hot 93.3 has returned to their previous Top 40/CHR format and then swapped to a 90s-2000s-based Hot AC format until January 2024 when it switched to a simulcast of News/Talk station WBAP 820 AM. It also competed with CBS Radio-owned KVIL (103.7 FM) from October 2016 to November 2017.

== KHKS-HD2 ==
106.1-HD2 (HD Radio) first launched in 2004, as "Kiss-FM En Espanol", targeting an Hispanic audience with Hispanic rhythmic format. That format was jettisoned in favor of Pride Radio, in late 2006, with a format intended for the LGBT community. "Pride Radio" was then moved to its sister station KDMX on 102.9-HD2 in favor of "Wild Radio" in early 2008, running "Party Mix" (rhythmic CHR) music similar to the "Kiss FM" playlist. However, since March 28, 2011, it has been replaced by Pride Radio, marking the format's return to that particular frequency.
