= Gordon McLendon =

American broadcaster (1921–1986)

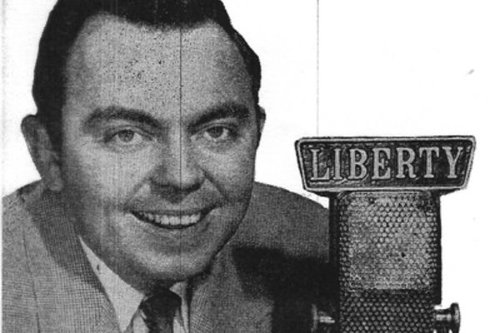
- Liberty founder Gordon McLendon with a Liberty-branded microphone
- Born: Gordon Barton McLendon; June 8, 1921; Paris, Texas, U.S.
- Died: September 14, 1986 (aged 65); Lake Dallas, Texas, U.S.
- Education: Harvard Law School; Yale University
- Occupations: Businessman; investor; intelligence officer
- Political party: Democrat; Libertarian; Republican
- Spouses: Gay Noe (m. 1943; div. 1958); Susan Stafford (m. 1973; div. 1975)

Gordon Barton McLendon (June 8, 1921 – September 14, 1986) was an American radio broadcaster. Nicknamed "the Maverick of Radio", McLendon is widely credited for perfecting, during the 1950s and 1960s, the commercially successful Top 40 radio format created by Todd Storz. He also developed offshore pirate radio broadcasting to both Scandinavia and the British Isles. In addition, he was active in circles of conservative business-political power in the 1960s until the time of his death.

== Background ==
McLendon was born in Paris, Texas, and spent his early childhood in Oklahoma. The family moved to Atlanta, Texas, where he attended high school and began to develop his interest in broadcasting. He covered sports events and broadcast commentary over the school's public address system. He graduated from Kemper Military Academy. He won a nationwide political-essay contest judged by journalists Arthur Brisbane, Henry Luce, and Walter Lippmann. After being accepted to Harvard, Yale, and Princeton, he decided to attend Yale because it was the only school that didn't offer him a scholarship. At Yale, he was editor of the Yale Literary Magazine and a member of Chi Psi, a Yale fraternity.

McLendon fought in World War II and was commissioned as a Japanese-language intelligence officer in the Office of Naval Intelligence.

He was later reassigned, giving him the opportunity to extend his style of commentary to political events over a United States Armed Forces Radio Service station. He then briefly attended Harvard Law School but left prematurely to buy an interest in a station in Palestine, Texas, KNET.

McLendon was a co-founder of the Association of Former Intelligence Officers.

McLendon was married in 1943 to Gay Noe, daughter of James A. Noe, former governor of Louisiana; in 1973 he married Susan Stafford, a syndicated columnist, radio talk-show host, and actress.

McLendon was known for his elaborate practical jokes, orchestrated on such notables as sitting President Richard Nixon and J. Edgar Hoover both of whom he called friends. He was a member of the board of stewards of Highland Park Methodist Church in Dallas and the board of directors of the Dallas Symphony Orchestra, Texas chairman of the March of Dimes, and an honorary chairman of the Veterans of Foreign Wars Poppy Drive. In 1964–65 he served as a communications adviser to the United States Peace Corps. In 1971 he conducted a month-long all-expense-paid broadcasting course for nine minority-group members, including African Americans, Puerto Ricans, and Mexican-Americans.

== Broadcasting ==
=== Liberty Broadcasting System ===
McLendon, who nicknamed himself "The Old Scotchman", is also noted in radio history as the founder of the Liberty Radio Network (noted for its daily national broadcasts of Major League Baseball) in the 1940s. Liberty was the second largest radio network in the U.S. at the time with over 458 affiliated stations. Most of Liberty's MLB broadcasts were re-creations of games, utilizing McLendon himself and future sportscasting stars such as Lindsey Nelson and Jerry Doggett on play-by-play.

It was a live, not recreated game that provided McLendon and Liberty with their greatest career moment. The Old Scotchman himself was behind the Liberty microphone at the Polo Grounds in New York for the October 3, 1951, finale of the three-game National League play-off series between the New York Giants and Brooklyn Dodgers. Bobby Thomson of the Giants swung at Dodger Ralph Branca's 0–1 pitch in the last of the ninth with two runners aboard, and McLendon barked:

Bobby swings, there's a long one out there out to left! Going, going, GONE and the Giants win the pennant!

Gordon then went silent and let the crowd's roar speak for itself. With radio still the more popular nationwide medium then, and with Russ Hodges' radio call limited to WMCA and its Giants' network, McLendon's call is how most Americans heard the NL clincher.

=== Offshore Pirate radio ===
For a time, he owned a converted fishing boat in the North Sea, which beamed into Sweden and other European countries. In 1960, McLendon and his close friend, Clint Murchison, owned Radio Nord, which broadcast from an offshore facility that was called a pirate radio station by the Swedish government because it was located on board a radio ship and outside of their legal jurisdiction. When that venture came to an end, the vessel was brought back to Galveston, Texas, where the ship remained for a year until it was leased to a British operation.

The new 1964 station was called Radio Atlanta (after McLendon's home town). Unfortunately, due to blunders in keeping the project secret, these plans were shared with Jocelyn Stevens, editor of Queen magazine in London, who was a financial supporter of another station, Radio Caroline. Later, in 1964, McLendon shared his experience at offshore broadcasting with Don Pierson of Eastland, Texas, who created a mirror of McLendon's KLIF radio station in Dallas. That new incarnation was to have been called Radio KLIF London but, when it came on air, it was identified as Radio London.

=== U.S. radio stations ===
McLendon and his father founded radio station KLIF (The Mighty 1190) in Oak Cliff, Dallas, Texas in 1947, and introduced the Top 40 format there in the early 1950s to great success. KLIF enjoyed a long run at the top of the Dallas radio ratings in the 1950s and 1960s, but its standing in the market fell in the early 1970s thanks to growing competition from FM radio. One of the FM stations most instrumental in the downfall of KLIF was its former sister station KNUS (now KSPF), of which McLendon retained ownership after selling KLIF and revamped as a rock-oriented Top 40.

The McLendon family built a communications empire that included radio stations across the United States. In addition to KLIF, McLendon owned KNUS–FM in Dallas, KOST in Los Angeles, WYNR (later WNUS) & WNUS-FM in Chicago, WWWW–FM in Detroit, KEEL in Shreveport, WAKY in Louisville, KABL in Oakland, KABL–FM in San Francisco, KILT in Houston, KTSA in San Antonio (that he briefly renamed KAKI due to the military bases in the city), and KELP in El Paso. McLendon introduced the all-news format to Southern California through XETRA in Tijuana. McLendon was one of the originators of the "beautiful music" format on his KABL in Oakland, California, in 1959; and as the founder of the first all-news radio station (WNUS in Chicago) in the 1960s.

He is credited by most broadcast historians with having established the first mobile news units in American radio, the first traffic reports, the first jingles, the first all-news radio station, and the first "easy-listening" programming. He also was among the first broadcasters in the United States to editorialize. McLendon especially attracted attention for his stern denunciations of French president Charles De Gaulle, whom he described as "an ungrateful four-flusher" who could "go straight to hell."

The McLendon family sold KLIF in 1971 to Fairchild Industries of Germantown, Maryland, for $10.5 million, then a record price for a radio station. By 1979 the family had sold all of its broadcasting properties, including fourteen radio and two television stations, worth approximately $100 million. By 1985 Forbes magazine estimated McLendon's net worth at $200 million.

=== Television ===
In 1954, McLendon considered acquiring a share of Oklahoma City UHF station KMPT, but opted against it, finding the struggling station "too far gone" (it closed a year later). McLendon was also the last owner of ABC affiliate KCND-TV in Pembina, North Dakota. In 1975, he sold that station to Winnipeg executive Izzy Asper, who moved the station to Winnipeg and used it to start up CKND-TV, which would become the genesis of the present-day Canwest media empire and the modern-day Global Television Network.

== Movies and theatres ==
In 1959, McLendon co-produced and co-starred in two sci-fi monster movies filmed in Texas, The Killer Shrews and The Giant Gila Monster. He produced over 150 motion-picture campaigns for United Artists from 1963 to 1966. At one point, he became the largest shareholder in Columbia Pictures. He was the executive producer of Escape to Victory, directed by John Huston and starring Michael Caine, Sylvester Stallone, and Max von Sydow. He also owned McLendon Theatres, which operated more than forty movie theatres throughout the south, including many drive-ins.

== Oil ==
McLendon's father-in-law was former Louisiana Governor and oil magnate James A. Noe who, along with his partner, Governor Huey Long, formed the controversial Win or Lose Oil Company. The firm was established to obtain leases on state-owned lands so that the directors might collect bonuses and sublease the mineral rights to the major oil companies. Although ruled legal, these activities were done in secret and the stockholders were unknown to the public. Noe and Long made a profit on the bonuses and the resale of those state leases, using the funds primarily for political purposes.

McLendon had his own investments in the oil business. He was a friend of the Dallas oilman Clint Murchison Jr.

== Author ==
McLendon became an authority on precious metals and wrote a book entitled Get Really Rich in the Coming Super Metals Boom, published in 1981. He also authored a number of other books, including How to Succeed in Broadcasting (1961), Correct Spelling in Three Hours (1962), Understanding American Government (1964), and 100 Years of America in Sound (1965).

== Politics ==
In 1954, he called for a US withdrawal of NATO, citing financial cost, and suggesting instead that European countries be responsible for their security.

McLendon, a conservative Democrat, garnered 43% of the vote in a primary race against liberal incumbent US Senator Ralph Yarborough in 1964. During the campaign, he was accompanied by such Hollywood luminaries as John Wayne, Chill Wills, and Robert Cummings. He ran on a platform of opposing the Civil Rights Act, arguing that it gave "broad and sweeping powers" to the federal government.

He entered the primary for the 1968 Texas gubernatorial election, but withdrew from both the election and the Democratic Party, citing President Lyndon Johnson's Vietnam War policies.

McLendon reportedly provided funds for Gerry Patrick Hemmings "Interpen" organisation, an anti-Castro armed grouping. In 1978, McLendon and producer Fred Weintraub worked on an idea for a TV series about the CIA. He was disillusioned with the negative portrayal of the agency, such as in the film Three Days of the Condor. As a result, McLendon and CIA veteran David Atlee Phillips approached CIA Director Stansfield Turner in March 1978 about the idea, although nothing came of the proposal.

McLendon was acquainted with Lee Harvey Oswald's killer, Jack Ruby. Ruby was both an admirer and friend of McLendon, telling the FBI that McLendon was one of his "six closest friends". McLendon allowed Ruby to advertise on his radio station, KLIF. Following Ruby's arrest, he asked George Senator to get in contact with McLendon to let him know where he was. Ruby testified that the day before his murder of Oswald, he attempted to call McLendon but could not reach him. The last letter Ruby wrote before he died in prison was to McLendon.

== Later life ==
In December 1985, McLendon was reported to have been critically wounded while cleaning his .38-caliber pistol. He died of cancer at his ranch home near Lake Dallas, Texas, on September 14, 1986. He was inducted into the National Radio Hall of Fame in 1994.

== See also ==
- Todd Storz
- PAMS jingles
