= KZPS =

Radio station in Dallas

- Dallas, Texas; United States
- Broadcast area: Dallas–Fort Worth metroplex
- Frequency: 92.5 MHz (HD Radio)
- Branding: Lone Star 92.5

Programming
- Language: English
- Format: Classic rock
- Subchannels: HD2: TikTok Radio

Ownership
- Owner: iHeartMedia, Inc.; (iHM Licenses, LLC)
- Sister stations: KDGE; KDMX; KEGL; KFXR; KHKS; KHVN; KKGM

History
- First air date: April 1, 1948
- Former call signs: KRLD-FM (1948–1972); KAFM (1972–1986)
- Call sign meaning: Power Station (former branding)

Technical information
- Licensing authority: FCC
- Facility ID: 6378
- Class: C
- ERP: 100,000 watts
- HAAT: 508 metres (1,667 ft)
- Transmitter coordinates: 32°35′19″N 96°58′05″W

Links
- Public license information: Public file; LMS
- Webcast: Listen live (via iHeartRadio)
- Website: lonestar925.iheart.com

KZPS (92.5 FM) is an iHeartMedia classic rock formatted commercial radio station licensed to Dallas, Texas, and serving the Dallas–Fort Worth metroplex. Its studios are located along Dallas Parkway in Farmers Branch (although it has a Dallas address).

KZPS has an effective radiated power (ERP) of 100,000 watts. The transmitter site is off West Belt Line Road in Cedar Hill, amid the towers for other Dallas-area FM and TV stations. The station uses HD Radio technology, although it currently offers no separate digital subchannels.

== History ==
=== KRLD-FM (1948–1972) ===
The station first signed on the air on April 1, 1948 with the KRLD-FM call sign. (That callsign is currently used on a sports radio station owned by Audacy, KRLD-FM.) The original KRLD-FM initially simulcast co-owned KRLD. KRLD-AM-FM were owned by the Times Herald Printing Company, along with daily newspaper The Dallas Times Herald. A TV station was added the following year, KRLD-TV (now KDFW).

KRLD-FM was one of only three 24-hour FM stations in the Dallas market in the 1960s. In the late 1960s, the Federal Communications Commission began requiring AM-FM combos in large cities to offer separate programming much of the day; a progressive rock format was instituted on the FM.

=== 92-And-A-Half & Power Station Z92.5 (1975–1987) ===
The call letters changed to KAFM in 1972, and the station underwent a number of format changes through the 1970s and 1980s. From 1972 to 1975 the format was "Cosmic Cowboy" first wave; Jerry Jeff Walker, Rusty Weir, BW Stevenson, etc. The Dallas-Fort Worth market was left without a single CHR station throughout parts of the early 1980s, but it wasn't until the first few quarters of 1983 when the Dallas-Fort Worth metroplex added its second CHR station after KAFM dropped its short-lived adult contemporary formats. It was known as "92½ FM" with its slogan "Maximum Hits". In 1986, it was rebranded as "Z92.5" with its slogan "Your Power Station Z92.5". Its current call sign KZPS originated from that rebrand, with the last two letters representing "Power Station", a MOR format, and an adult contemporary format.

From 1971 to 1978, the station was owned by the family of former Dallas Mayor J. Erik Jonsson. It was sold to Bonneville International in the summer of 1978.

=== Classic Rock (1987–present) ===
The year 1987 was a hard one for Top 40/CHR in the Dallas-Fort Worth area, as two of the four CHR stations flipped to new formats. KZPS flipped to classic hits in February, and its nearby successor KTKS flipped to Smooth Jazz later that September. That left KHYI as the only mainstream Top 40 station in the metroplex, while KEGL continued its success of being a rock-based Top 40 format, but gradually died down by the late 1980s. However, AC station KVIL-FM also gained major success with a small mix of CHR as well, making it more dominant in the market.

KZPS's classic hits format gradually transitioned to classic rock, and added the syndicated John Boy and Billy morning show in 1995. The station imaging switched to "Ninety Two Five KZPS, the Classic Rock station". John Boy and Billy were later replaced by local hosts Sam "Bo" Roberts and "Long" Jim White ("Bo and Jim") in mornings.

Evergreen Media bought the station from Bonneville International in 1997. Evergreen was later acquired by Clear Channel Communications, a forerunner of iHeartMedia. Through the years, notable disk jockeys included Sam "Bo" Roberts and "Long" Jim White (Jim White retired in 2022 and Bo Roberts released in 2025), Jay Philpott (middays, later in Baltimore), Jon Dillon (afternoon drive, until his release in 2012), Stubie Doak (nights), Pamela Steele (middays), Ed Budanauro ("Enerjazz" host from 1987 to 1989), Benn McGregor ("McGregor" - 1982–86 writer/producer, co-host of "Morning Drive" with Andy Barber 1984–1985), Jerry Vigil (middays, production director), Pete Thomson (afternoons), John Shomby (program director), and Paul Donovan (evenings).

On April 23, 2007, KZPS rebranded itself as "Lone Star 92.5", and adopted a Texas-themed classic rock/country rock hybrid format that was previously heard on 92.5-HD2. About a year later, KZPS changed back to its previous classic rock format, keeping the "Lone Star 92.5" branding.

iHeartMedia terminated Sam "Bo" Roberts' contract on October 7, 2025 as part of nationwide layoffs.

== KZPS-HD2 ==
Since KZPS rebranded as "Lone Star 92.5", the classic rock format was briefly heard on 92.5-HD2. In April 2008, when KZPS returned to classic rock, 92.5-HD2 switched to an adult album alternative format branded as "The Music Summit" (previously on KDMX-HD2).

In October 2013, it was simulcasting from iHeartRadio's "World Class Rock" network utilizing the same format as before. Since April 2015, it was renamed to "The iHeart Current" and a month later, renamed again as "iHeart Eclectic". The AAA station in May 2018 rebranded as "Eclectic Rock".

Since mid-2019, the Eclectic Rock feed was discontinued on KZPS-HD2, leaving the digital subchannel with no programming replacement.

KZPS's HD2 signal did resume programming for a brief period, but ceased programming once again by October 2021.

KZPS's HD2 subchannel was re-activated in late January 2026 with iHeartRadio's "TikTok Radio" service.
