= KSPF =

Radio station in Dallas

- Dallas, Texas; United States
- Broadcast area: Dallas–Fort Worth metroplex
- Frequency: 98.7 MHz (HD Radio)
- Branding: 98.7 The Spot

Programming
- Language: English
- Format: Classic hits
- Subchannels: HD2: News/talk (KRLD simulcast)

Ownership
- Owner: Audacy, Inc.; (Audacy License, LLC)
- Sister stations: KJKK; KMVK; KRLD; KRLD-FM; KVIL

History
- First air date: 1961
- Former call signs: KROW (1961–63); KLIF-FM (1963–66); KNUS (1966–81); KLVU (1981–84); KLUV (1984–2023)
- Call sign meaning: "Spot FM" (station branding)

Technical information
- Licensing authority: FCC
- Facility ID: 67195
- Class: C
- ERP: 100,000 watts
- HAAT: 507 meters (1,663 ft)
- Transmitter coordinates: 32°35′19.5″N 96°58′6″W

Links
- Public license information: Public file; LMS
- Webcast: Listen live
- Website: www.audacy.com/987thespot

KSPF (98.7 FM, "98.7 The Spot") is a commercial radio station licensed to Dallas, Texas, and serving the Dallas–Fort Worth metroplex. KSPF is owned by Audacy, Inc., and airs a classic hits radio format.

KSPF's studios and offices are located off North Central Expressway at North Fitzhugh Avenue in Dallas. The transmitter site is in Cedar Hill off West Belt Line Road, amid the towers for other Dallas-area FM and TV stations. KSPF broadcasts in the HD Radio hybrid format; a simulcast of sister station KRLD is heard on the station's HD2 sub-channel.

== History ==
=== KROW and KLIF-FM ===
In 1959, when the station was not yet on the air, it was given the call sign KOST, but that was never used. The station was then rebranded KROW and signed on in 1961 as a Top 40 station under the ownership of noted radio programmer Gordon McLendon. Two years later, the call sign changed to KLIF-FM as a simulcast of McLendon-owned AM 1190 KLIF (now KFXR).

=== KNUS ===
In July 1966, the station changed its call sign to KNUS and began an automated progressive rock/underground rock format, with live disc jockeys added in mid-1967. (McLendon had originally planned to provide an all-news format on the station, hence the NUS (pronounced like "news") call letters, but that never took place.) When McLendon sold his AM Top 40 flagship station KLIF to Fairchild Industries in 1972, he offered the company KNUS as well, but Fairchild declined. As part of the sale, McLendon agreed not to operate any AM station within a 150-mile radius of Dallas. Since the agreement did not forbid him to operate an FM station, McLendon continued to own and program KNUS.

In May 1972, the station shifted to a rock-based Top 40 station, which played hit music without teen-oriented "bubblegum" songs. (The station's initial promotion to plug the new Top 40 format had a disc jockey positioned at the top of a flagpole at McLendon's Gemini Drive-In Movie Theatre. The pole had large "KNUS" lettering mounted vertically on each side of the square truss. The pole was still intact in the 1990s, long after the KNUS calls were dropped, and the Gemini had shut down.)

=== Transition to oldies ===
KNUS eventually transitioned into a more mainstream Top 40, and it paid off when the station passed KLIF in the ratings in the fall of 1975, becoming one of the first FM Top 40 stations to defeat its chief AM competitor. By the end of the 1970s, however, KNUS had fallen out of the top ten. McLendon sold KNUS to the San Juan Racing Corporation in May 1979, which, in turn, sold the station to John Tenaglia's TK Communications on October 27, 1982. Under Tenaglia's ownership, the station switched to an adult contemporary format as KLVU on October 19, 1981. Initially, the station played hits from 1964 through the 1980s and including then-current product. A handful of pre-'64 oldies were also mixed in. In 1984, after an AM oldies station changed formats, KLVU began adding more pre-1964 oldies in the mix. The music began to lean slightly more up-tempo as well. The station morphed into an all-oldies format in 1985, playing pop oldies from the late 1950s, '60s, '70s, and early '80s. The music from the mid to late-1970s and '80s gradually was eliminated in 1986. By then, KLUV was playing only hits from 1955 to 1973.

Owner John Tenaglia purchased the more-coveted KLUV-spelled call sign for $10,000 from a Haynesville, Louisiana, station, trading 98.7's former KLVU calls (which were established at 98.7 on October 19, 1981, under the station's San Juan Racing ownership). By the late 1980s, KLUV evolved into a 1964 to 1969-based oldies format playing a couple pre-1964 songs each hour and one or two early 1970s songs per hour. Tenaglia sold the rebranded KLUV to CBS on April 21, 1995, for a then-staggering $55 million.

KLUV's ident used until 2005.

The years when Chuck Brinkman was the program director (1988–2006) included many personalities such as Hubcap Carter, Glen Martin (who had also previously been there during the KNUS and KLVU days), Jason Walker, Jonathan Hayes, Jim Brady, Johnny Michaels, Steve Eberhart, Al Forgeson, Paula Street (who in 1987 went to WODS Boston, now KLUV's sister station), Dave Van Dyke, Charlie Van Dyke (the station's imaging voice at the time), Debi Diaz, John Summers, Jim Prewitt, Jay Cresswell, Bob Gomez, Sandi Sharp, Ben Laurie, Bob deCarlo, Roger Manning (who inherited the Saturday Night Oldies Party from Hubcap Carter), Johnny Stone, John McCarty, Tony Moreno, Mike Wade, Brian Pierce, Kate Garvin, and Ken Fine, who was Chief Engineer.

=== Death of Ricky Nelson ===
On December 31, 1985, singer Ricky Nelson and his band were flying to KLUV's New Year's Eve sock hop, hosted by Ken "Hubcap" Carter. The plane crashed near DeKalb, Texas, 136 miles northeast of Dallas, killing Nelson and his entourage.

=== Transition to classic hits ===
In 1997, KLUV, like many oldies stations around the United States, began mixing in (in this case, bringing back) hits of the late 1970s and even a few from the early 1980s. In 1998, the station largely removed most of the 1955 to 1963 songs from its playlist. Another CBS station, KLUV (AM) 1190 (now KFXR) and, coincidentally, the same dial position as former sister station KLIF, existed from 1998 to 2000 and primarily played 1950s music. Meanwhile, the main station continued modifying its format to more of a classic hits format with songs from the mid-1960s to early 1980s. By 2003, KLUV no longer played pre-1964 music, with a few rare exceptions. Most years, on Memorial Day weekend, KLUV featured a "Top 500 Countdown" in which the top 500 oldies, as picked by the station's listeners, were played in descending order for the entire weekend. During this time, Breakfast with the Beatles was also one of the specialty programs that aired on KLUV on Sunday mornings.

In 2002, the station was temporarily the radio home of the Dallas Cowboys football team, featuring live broadcasts of their games. In 2006, Dallas Cowboys broadcasts moved to sports radio station KTCK.

From November 23, 1998, to June 27, 2003, KLUV competed with Disney/ABC Radio's KMEO ("Memories 96.7") and again from June 30, 2008, until March 12, 2010, with Citadel Broadcasting's KPMZ ("Platinum 96.7"). Both stations aired a classic adult contemporary format playing soft hits of the 1960s to the 1980s with a couple of pre-1964 songs per hour. (Today, 96.7 is sports station KTCK-FM).

KLUV was the first radio station in the United States to report the death of Michael Jackson in July 2009.

In 2005, with the retirement of long-time radio veteran and morning host Ron Chapman, KLUV hired noted Dallas news personality Jody Dean as his replacement. On October 25, 2010, Jody Dean and the Morning Team started simulcasting the show on then co-owned KTXA. In January 2013, Jody Dean and the Morning Team was downsized to just Jody Dean and Rebekah Black, later adding David Rancken. In 2018, station management declined to renew Dean's contract - ending the longest-running and highest-rated show in station history. Dean was replaced by Jeff Miles, who joined Black as host of Miles in the Morning - consisting of Miles, Black, and Alex Luckey. Despite consistent ratings success all three were let go just four years later.

=== Dallas-Fort Worth's Christmas station ===
KLUV's sister station, then-adult contemporary KVIL (103.7 FM), would usually flip to Christmas music from mid-November to the day after Christmas Day for many years until 2013, when the station shifted to a Hot AC format in May that year. Therefore, the Christmas music format moved to KLUV and began on November 15, 2013. For 2014, the Christmas format began on November 13 and ended at midnight on December 29. From 2013 until Christmas night in 2017, KLUV had simulcast its Christmas music on sister TV station KTXA during that station's annual Yule Log special, which runs from the evening of Christmas Eve to Christmas Day.

When the station first began airing all-Christmas, there had been rumors that KLUV would drop its longtime classic hits format on December 26, 2013, to become a Top 40/CHR station as "Amp Radio 98.7". CBS stated that there were no plans to change KLUV's format, with the station remaining classic hits. This format change was highly unlikely anyway, because the CHR format was already being heard on KHKS, KLIF-FM, and later on KVIL, who would rebrand as "AMP 103.7" in January 2017. In November 2016, KDGE (formerly known as alternative "102.1 The Edge") also switched to Christmas music after the station was relaunched as mainstream adult contemporary "Star 102.1". (KVIL itself shifted to alternative a year later.)

Starting in November 2019, KLUV began playing Christmas music on its HD3 sub-channel with a wider playlist than heard previously on KLUV's main signal. The main channel did not switch to all-Christmas music, continuing its classic hits format through December, but playing some occasional Christmas songs in its regular playlist.

=== Entercom/Audacy era ===
KLUV's logo, used until June 14, 2023

On February 2, 2017, CBS Radio announced it would merge with Entercom (now known as Audacy, Inc.). The merger was approved on November 9, 2017, and was consummated on November 17.

In early 2017, KLUV added in music from the 1990s by artists such as Sheryl Crow and UB40, while gradually phasing out music from the 1960s.

By 2019, KLUV's slogan changed to "Nobody Plays More 80s", which is also being used on other Audacy-owned classic hits stations such as WOGL in Philadelphia.

On June 14, 2023, at 6 a.m., KLUV relaunched as "98.7 The Spot", utilizing a brand used at sister station KKHH in Houston. The final song under the KLUV brand was "Celebration" by Kool & the Gang, while the first song as "The Spot" was "Sweet Child o' Mine" by Guns N' Roses. The change came as a result of the "K-LUV" intellectual property being transferred to Educational Media Foundation (EMF) as part of a deal including ownership of WTSS in Buffalo and WLFP in Memphis; Dallas–Fort Worth had been one of three markets in which EMF's national trademark for K-Love was preempted by an existing usage of the name. "The Spot" launched jockless, with the fate of KLUV's existing airstaff left unannounced. While the new brand is undoubtedly influenced by KKHH's adult hits presentation, KLUV retains a classic hits-style focus on music from the 1970s to 1990s, with some hits from the 2000s, as Audacy already programs an adult hits format in Dallas–Fort Worth on KJKK. On June 20, Audacy filed to change the station's call sign to KSPF effective June 26, with KLUV being moved to the construction permit for a new EMF-owned station in Huron, South Dakota.

== KSPF HD channels ==
=== HD2 ===
98.7 (as KLUV at the time) launched HD Radio operations in 2006, including an HD2 sub-channel. Originally, it was called "The Fab Format", playing The Beatles full time. In January 2008, the HD signal changed to KLUV's previous oldies format, playing music from the 1950s, 1960s and some early 1970s. The station was received on HD-equipped radios on 98.7-HD2. In August 2018, it had rebranded as "Smokin' Oldies", while retaining its oldies focus.

On February 27, 2023, the oldies format on the HD2 subchannel was replaced by a simulcast of KRLD's news format, which is also carried on KJKK's HD2 subchannel.

=== HD3 ===
In early May 2016, 98.7 launched another digital subchannel on 98.7-HD3, and aired Radio Disney's Top 40 format targeted to children and younger teens. (Radio Disney was previously heard on KMKI until September 15, 2015.) Entercom's deal with Radio Disney expired at the end of May 2018. The next month, KLUV-HD3 flipped to a classic AOR-format known as "KLUV Classic Trax," playing deep cuts from the 1970s to the 1990s. Starting with the 2019 holiday season, KLUV-HD3 began airing Christmas music from early November through Christmas Day. The subchannel aired a few public service announcements each hour but had no commercial interruptions. The HD3 signal has since been turned off with no programming replacement.

KSPF is heard online on the Audacy platform.
