= KDGE =

Radio station in Fort Worth–Dallas, Texas

Coordinates: 32.582°N 96.976°W

- Fort Worth–Dallas, Texas; United States
- Broadcast area: Dallas–Fort Worth metroplex
- Frequency: 102.1 MHz (HD Radio)
- Branding: Star 102.1

Programming
- Format: Mainstream Adult Contemporary
- Subchannels: HD2: Bilingual AC "Magic 102.1 HD2"
- Affiliations: Premiere Networks

Ownership
- Owner: iHeartMedia, Inc.; (iHM Licenses, LLC)
- Sister stations: KDMX; KEGL; KFXR; KHKS; KHVN; KKGM; KZPS

History
- First air date: April 10, 1962
- Former call signs: KFMF (1961–1962, CP); KJIM-FM (1962–1967); KFWT-FM (1967–1970); KFWD (1970–1978); KTXQ (1978–2000)
- Call sign meaning: Former "Edge" brand

Technical information
- Licensing authority: FCC
- Facility ID: 9620
- Class: C
- ERP: 100,000 watts
- HAAT: 1,788 feet (545 m)

Links
- Public license information: Public file; LMS
- Webcast: Listen live (via iHeartRadio)
- Website: star1021.iheart.com

KDGE (102.1 FM) is a commercial radio station dually licensed to both Fort Worth and Dallas, Texas. Star 102.1 airs an adult contemporary radio format, switching to Christmas music for much of November and December, and is owned by iHeartMedia, Inc.

The station's studios are located along Dallas Parkway in Farmers Branch, Texas (although it has a Dallas address), and its transmitter site is off West Belt Line Road in Cedar Hill. KDGE broadcasts using HD Radio technology. Its HD2 digital subchannel carries a bilingual AC format, known as "Magic".

== History ==
=== Easy listening format ===
The station was authorized by the Federal Communications Commission in 1960 to broadcast as KFMF, but it was not immediately built. KJIM (870 AM; now KFJZ) purchased the KFMF construction permit and it signed on the air on April 10, 1962, as KJIM-FM. At first, KJIM-FM simulcast the daytime-only AM sister station, to allow programming to be heard after sunset. Later, KJIM-FM switched to an automated easy listening instrumental format. KJIM-AM-FM acquired a UHF-TV permit in the mid-1960s to construct channel 21 (today KTXA). The company sold off AM 870 to raise capital.

=== Move to album rock ===
In 1966, KJIM-FM changed their call letters to KFWT-FM and improved its signal, going from 2,900 watts at 165 feet to 100,000 watts at 1,000 feet HAAT from the antenna tower that would also transmit KFWT-TV (channel 21). (KFWT-TV went on the air in 1967 and signed off in 1970; a new station, KTXA, would reactivate channel 21 in 1980.) KFWT-FM was sold to Marsh Media of Amarillo, Texas, and subsequently changed its call letters to KFWD in 1971. In 1973, the station flipped to a Top 40 format. After two years, an album rock was put in place in January 1975.

=== Switch to Q102 ===
In October 1978, new general manager Bud Stiker led the change of the call sign to KTXQ and the branding to "Q102" (to launder the station of a Fort Worth image, and to lessen confusion with then-CBS network affiliate KDFW-TV Channel 4). In 1983, CBS Radio bought the station. Through the 1980s and 1990s, the station aired variations on the rock format, including classic rock and mainstream rock. Morning hosts Bo and Jim were popular Q102 DJs for most of Q102's existence. Though KTXQ maintained high ratings for years, by the mid-1990s, the station fell into a steep decline, particularly after the debut of KRRW's similar-sounding classic rock format. In its final book in the summer of 1998, KTXQ was ranked 19th with a 2.4 share of the market.

In early 1997, CBS sold the station to New York City-based SFX Broadcasting. By August of that year, however, Austin-based Capstar merged with SFX. Six months later, locally based Chancellor Media acquired KTXQ through a series of trades with Capstar.

=== Magic 102 ===
At Noon on August 27, 1998, on the same day that Chancellor announced that they would merge with Capstar to form AMFM, Inc., KTXQ discontinued its long-running rock format and began stunting with simulcasts of other AMFM stations from across the country (including KYLD, WHTZ, KYSR, and WUBE-FM), as well as redirecting listeners to KZPS. On August 31, at 3 pm, KTXQ flipped to rhythmic oldies as "Magic 102". The first song on "Magic" was "Shotgun" by Jr. Walker & the All Stars.

=== 102.1 The Edge ===
In 2000, as a condition of Clear Channel's purchase of AMFM, sister station 94.5 FM, along with the intellectual property of Magic 102, were sold to Radio One. When Radio One moved the rhythmic oldies format to 94.5 at 6 a.m. on November 9, 2000, Clear Channel moved 94.5's alternative rock format to 102.1 as KDGE, "102.1 the Edge".

==== KDGE history ====
Created by Founder and original owner Steve Allison in 1989 (Allison Broadcast Group, Inc.), the EDGE was basically an evolution of Allison's Phoenix radio station, KEYX "KEY 100.3" an alternative station which he founded in 1986. Allison bought then-KZRK for $3.6 million cash. KZRK programmed the syndicated heavy metal format ZRock. Soon after debuting KDGE, Allison then immediately took on the construction of a 2,000-foot tower in Collinsville, Texas to improve the station's signal. Steve Allison chose the name "The EDGE" and changed the call letters to KDGE. He also designed the station's logo and chose and developed its format. Larry Neilson, the former program director of KEYX in Phoenix was chosen as the original EDGE Program Director. Wendy Naylor, who had worked for Allison at his various stations in Phoenix since 1982, was chosen as the music director and morning show co-host along with KEYX alumni Roger King. Also relocating to Dallas from Phoenix was Tom Duran as the Sales Manager and a major player in helping create The EDGE's promotion and concerts. Months before The EDGE debut in June 1989, the KEYX Phoenix crew was formulating the station's format, promotions, etc. from a temporary suite while the EDGE studios were being built out next door. Two weeks before the EDGE debut, program director Larry Neilson was contacted by Dallas local George Gimarc about possibly doing a speciality show on The EDGE. Neilson was impressed by Gimarc's music knowledge, consulted with owner and general manager Steve Allison, and made the decision to put Gimarc on as the afternoon drive air personality. Gimarc proved to be a good hire and his influence on the station over time was invaluable, but he had nothing whatsoever to do with the "founding" of "The Edge". "The Edge" became an important force in the local music scene in Dallas, is the only station to play local and national "alternative" styles. (KEGL had switched to a more modern format around 1982 but by 1989, that station was largely playing hits from national playlists.)

Coinciding with the KDGE start-up, Steve Allison and Tom Duran formed a separate event promotion company called "Cutting Edge Events", which was the promotion force behind the station. They along with the station's Promotion Director, Tara Allison (Steve Allison's wife) created unusual events and promotions from 1989 through 1992. A collaborative effort by the Allisons, Duran, Neilson, Wendy Naylor and George Gimarc was the driving force in making The Edge a player in the Dallas market. From "Take the Edge on Vacation", to "Dinner on the Mayflower", the group kept the Edge on the cutting force of promotions in Dallas.

Important contributions were made by Gimarc, Naylor, and almost all staff members. Gimarc also assembled a series of 11 compilation CDs of local bands under the name Tales from the Edge. Released between 1990 and 1996, each CD featured between 15 and 20 bands, mostly from Dallas, Austin and Denton. The CDs were value-priced: the first four include the prominent slogan "Still Only $2.94!" (sponsorships and advertising paid for the bulk of production). Several later issues were double-CD compilations, with one CD featuring current local bands, and the other being more specialized, including one focused on the area's earliest punk bands, including tracks by The Nervebreakers, The Telefones, Stickmen With Rayguns, and The Hugh Beaumont Experience, while another, put together by DJ Jeff K, featuring the (then-)newer styles of dance-club music including techno, trance and electropop (a direction the station was increasingly taking in 1994–95, after the departure of Gimarc, and with the increasing prominence of Jeff K). Notable artists featured on the CDs early in their careers included Course of Empire, Horton Heat, Deep Blue Something, Tripping Daisy, Sister 7 (as "Little Sister"), and Poi Dog Pondering. All told, over 100,000 CDs were sold in the series.

The station featured an annual music festival called Edgefest once a year, plus an annual EDGE B-Day party concert and party. Past Edgefest acts included Pearl Jam, The Charlatans, Sugarcubes, Tripping Daisy, Seether, The Origin, Nickelback, Staind, My Chemical Romance, Muse, The Killers, Placebo, Kaiser Chiefs, Weezer, The Toadies, Blue October, INXS, Beck, Social Distortion, Everclear, Sponge, The Mighty Mighty Bosstones, Default, KoRn, Deftones, Hole, Phoenix, The Black Keys, Cage the Elephant, Cake, Flogging Molly and Drowning Pool. The first Edgefest was documented in the Jerry Lentz film "Angry Blue Planet".

There were also seven editions of The Edge Home Movie, a free rental - full hour of music videos hosted by Edge DJs. One was filmed at Edgefest in 1994, and another at Lollapalooza that same year. Other notable jocks during this time include Alex Luke, Brian the Butler, Jerry Lentz, Roger King, Ernie Mills, Jeff K, Josh Venable, DJ Merritt, and Valerie Knight.

In 1994, Steve Allison sold KDGE for $16 million to the broadcast-arm of the Church of Jesus Christ of Latter-day Saints, which also owned classic rock station KZPS. After that ownership change, Gimarc, Naylor, and the entire Phoenix contingent were shown the door and the station changed direction dramatically, now being "corporate" programmed. A year later, Clear Channel Communications bought all of the Mormon broadcasting company's stations nationally. Clear Channel later changed their name to IHeart Radio.

On May 18, 2004, when sister station KEGL dropped its rock format and flipped to a gold-based adult contemporary format as “Sunny 97.1” KDGE began adding rock artists into its playlist.

On December 18, 2007, when sister station KEGL flipped back to its rock format as “97.1 The Eagle” KDGE began removing rock artists from its playlist.

On January 9, 2008, The Lex and Terry Show has been moved from KDGE to sister station KEGL.

On May 21, 2008, KDGE became the flagship station of The Billy Madison Show after The Lex & Terry Show moved to sister station KEGL on January 9, 2008.

The station's 'unofficial' 20th Anniversary party was on July 3, 2009, at the Lakewood Theatre with performances from Zac Malloy of the Nixons, John Easdale of Dramarama, Deep Blue Something, Pop Poppins, and the Bat Mastersons.

On April 29, 2010, The Billy Madison Show left KDGE and moved back to Tulsa, Oklahoma's radio station KHTT.

Specialty programming included the Saturday night electronic/dance music show called "Edgeclub" with DJ Merritt (nation's longest-running and highest-rated mixshow), and Sunday shows "The Old School Edge" with Jeff K, "The Adventure Club" with Josh, and "The Local Show" with Mark, which features music made in the Dallas/Ft. Worth Metroplex. Edgeclub was taken off the air in 2010. Josh Venable became the program director in 2011.

In January 2013, KDGE was briefly re-branded as "102-1 KDGE"; it later returned to the "Edge" moniker.

=== Star 102.1 ===
Logo for "Star" used during November/December 2016; alternate version is red and green, with a Santa hat over the S.

On November 16, 2016, at 3 pm, after playing "Out of My League" by Fitz and the Tantrums, KDGE began stunting with a continuous loop of "Closing Time" by Semisonic (for the first few hours, it was interspersed with "It's the End of the World as We Know It (And I Feel Fine)" by R.E.M.), while redirecting Edge listeners to KEGL and that a new format would debut the following day at 5 p.m. on KDGE. At that time, the station shifted the stunting to Christmas music with the new branding of "Star 102.1". The first song played under the Christmas music stunting was "Last Christmas" by Wham!. At Midnight on December 26, after playing "Same Old Lang Syne" by Dan Fogelberg, KDGE officially debuted their permanent Mainstream Adult Contemporary format (under the "Star" branding and ending), with "Lucky Star" by Madonna as the first song played. The flip brought the format back to the Dallas-Fort Worth media market for the first time since 2014, when former longtime AC station KVIL evolved to Hot AC, and then to Top 40/CHR. KVIL has since flipped to Alternative as "Alt 103.7", picking up the same format one year after KDGE dropped the format.

On January 4, 2022, it was announced that KDGE will be adding Delilah's nightly show to their schedule starting January 10. This makes Delilah's return to the Dallas/Fort Worth market since being dropped by longtime affiliate KVIL in January 2014 during its gradual evolution to CHR/Top 40.

== KDGE-HD2 ==
KDGE's HD2 channel originally broadcast "The Cutting Edge" a version of the station's alternative rock format with reduced commercials and some tracks never before played on the radio. In July 2012, KDGE-HD2 switched formats and began airing a classic alternative format, renamed as "Old School Edge", with the playlist leaning toward adult alternative. In October 2013, it flipped to airing recent episodes of "Sixx Sense with Nikki Sixx" in addition to a mainstream rock format via iHeartRadio until the show's end. On February 1, 2018, it simulcast iHeartRadio's "Rock Workout" station, with an upbeat Mainstream Rock format. As of April 2018, the former alternative rock format was revived on KDGE-HD2 as "102.1-HD2 The Edge".

In late December 2023, the "Edge" branding and format were once again jettisoned, this time in favor of a bilingual English/Spanish adult contemporary format known as "Magic". On April 29, 2024, when KEGL flipped back to active rock, "The Edge" returned on KEGL-HD2.
