= KVIL =

Radio station in Highland Park–Dallas, Texas

- Highland Park–Dallas, Texas; United States
- Broadcast area: Dallas–Fort Worth metroplex
- Frequency: 103.7 MHz (HD Radio)
- Branding: Alt 103.7

Programming
- Language: English
- Format: Alternative rock
- Subchannels: HD2: Channel Q

Ownership
- Owner: Audacy, Inc.; (Audacy License, LLC)
- Sister stations: KJKK; KMVK; KRLD; KRLD-FM; KSPF

History
- First air date: August 14, 1961; 65 years ago
- Former call signs: KVIL-FM (1961–2006)
- Call sign meaning: Highland Park Village Shopping Center

Technical information
- Licensing authority: FCC
- Facility ID: 28624
- Class: C
- ERP: 100,000 watts
- HAAT: 507 meters (1,663 ft)
- Transmitter coordinates: 32°35′19″N 96°58′05″W

Links
- Public license information: Public file; LMS
- Webcast: Listen live (via Audacy)
- Website: www.audacy.com/alt1037dfw

KVIL (103.7 FM, Alt 103.7) is a commercial radio station dual-licensed to Highland Park and Dallas, Texas. It is owned by Audacy, Inc. and it serves the Dallas–Fort Worth metroplex in North Texas. The station's studios are located along North Central Expressway in Uptown Dallas. The station airs an alternative rock radio format.

The station's transmitter site is in Cedar Hill off West Belt Line Road. KVIL-FM has an effective radiated power (ERP) of 99,000 watts (100,000 with beam tilt). It broadcasts from a tower at 507 meters (1663 feet) in height above average terrain (HAAT).

KVIL broadcasts in HD. Its HD-2 subchannel carries "Channel Q," Audacy's national LGBTQ talk and EDM service.

== History ==
=== KVIL's beginnings ===
On August 14, 1961, KVIL-FM first signed on the air, as the FM sister station to KVIL (then on 1150 AM, now KBDT at 1160 AM). Because the AM station was a daytime only station, KVIL-FM was used to simulcast the AM's personality middle of the road music format around the clock.

The original location of the studios was in the Highland Park Village Shopping Center (hence the VIL call letters). The address was 4152 Mockingbird Lane at Preston Road, overlooking the Dallas Country Club golf course. In 1962 the owner/manager was John Coyle with the program director being Dillard Carerra. The station had an unusually high power of 119,000 watts in full stereo. (The power has since been reduced to 99,000 watts, because the antenna height was increased.)

The engineering of the audio was routed through a huge audio mixer with slider controls using German silver rheostats. Audio phasing was a problem at that time. Capitol Records, for instance, used a reverse-phasing that prevented anything recorded by The Beatles to be played, unless it was monaural. The reverse phasing simply blanked out the audio tracks to a distorted muffle.

"The singing time clock" was one of the first digital breakthroughs – actually a marriage of digital and analog technology. The clock audio was recorded on 1/4" tape in stereo played on AMPEX recorders in individual segments, by the jingle singers at PAMS in Dallas. The project was huge, involving musicians, singers, and recording engineers who taped every minute on the 24-hour clock in at least two versions, to be played by the station at the appropriate minute. The sequential clock was synchronized to the individual tape segments. When the DJ pushed the button, the audience heard "It's nine forty-three on the Kayville Clock, K-V-I-L" or any imaginable variation of such limerick – and in stereo. The pronunciation of "KVIL" as "Kayville" is probably the best-known example of a station's call letters actually being sung or spoken as a word.

=== Top 40 ===
KVIL-FM was the first station in the Dallas–Fort Worth area to broadcast Top 40 on FM and in stereo. The initial attempt in April 1967 was bold, offering good personalities, such as Frank Jolley, Ron McCoy, Davie Lee and others right from broadcast school. KVIL's Program Director at the time of the change was David Norwood. KVIL offered some interesting programming including the first Dallas broadcast of the Beatles' Sgt. Pepper's Lonely Hearts Club Band album, played in its entirety on the evening of its release.

The 1967 to 1969 attempt to take on the Top 40 leader KLIF (then at 1190 AM) failed because FM was still a relatively new format and only a small percentage of people owned FM radios. FM was not a "standard" feature in original equipment car radios until the late 1970s, even though it had been an option since the early 1960s. Additionally, KVIL's AM station was only on the air during daylight hours. This was an era where evenings were critical to a Top 40 station's success in the ratings, for teen listening after dinner. The failing station suffered in several ways, including employees running off with the records (possibly in place of the pay they were likely not receiving).

=== Adult Contemporary ===
The owners of KVIL-AM-FM from 1968 through 1973 were Highland Park socialites James B. Francis, Robert D. Hanna and John Ryman. In early 1969, KVIL starting broadcasting under the new management and spent several weeks broadcasting only music. There were no commercials except brief announcements by Dallas radio veteran Ron Chapman, telling listeners what was in store. This time, it happened as planned. Chapman's fame in Dallas radio, along with the increasing popularity of FM stereo, brought the station to prominence. In 1973, KVIL-AM-FM were sold to Fairbanks Broadcasting and Chapman stayed on as morning DJ. KVIL hired Mike Selden from KLIF and installed Bill Gardner and Jack Schell in middays. This dynamic lineup was coupled with programming insights from consultant George Johns, upper management direction from Jim Hilliard and Chapman's panache for marketing and promotion started KVIL's steady climb in the ratings.

KVIL instituted a music format that was unique for its time, a cross between Top 40 and MOR which would later be termed "Adult Contemporary." The station was meant to appeal to adult listeners who had grown up with KLIF by projecting the same type of "showmanship" typical of Top 40 stations, but with music that was not as teen-oriented as contemporary stations played. KVIL-AM-FM first finished in Dallas–Fort Worth's top 10 Arbitron ratings in 1974, the year after Arbitron combined Dallas and Fort Worth into a single market. It topped the ratings for the first time in the fall of 1976, with Chapman (and his cast of supporting players) in the morning, Larry Dixon and Bruce Buchanan (Jim Edwards) in mid-days, and Mike Selden in afternoon drivetime.

For many years during the 1970s and 1980s, KVIL-AM-FM was the top station in the market. KVIL aired 90 minutes of its morning show on KXTX-TV for a week in May every year, to show extravagant stunts such as a camel race in the African desert. During the early-1980s, KVIL was once considered as the "default" mainstream hit music station in the Dallas market (due to KEGL's lean towards AOR) until the launch of CHR outlet KAFM in early 1983. During the 1990s, it spent several years as the flagship station for the Dallas Cowboys, an unusual arrangement for an FM station in that era.

==== Infinity buys KVIL ====
In 1987, Infinity Broadcasting bought KVIL-AM-FM from Sconnix Broadcasting. The sale price was $82 million, the largest amount of money in radio history for an AM-FM combo up to that date. Sconnix had acquired KVIL-AM-FM only the month before in an eight-station deal. Infinity president Mel Karmazin said his company wanted a station in Dallas and "the best there is KVIL." Infinity later was folded into CBS Radio.

AM 1150 adopted the call sign KVIX and programmed a separate AC format from KVIL-FM for a short time after the sale to Infinity. It now operates at AM 1160 as talk radio station KBDT, co-owned with the USA Radio Network.

==== Lite FM ====
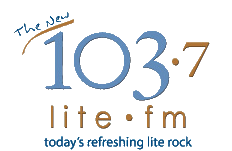
103.7 Lite FM logo used from 2006 to 2008.

In September 1998, KVIL rebranded as "Lite Rock 103.7," which was then changed to "103-7 Lite FM" in December 2005. From that point until 2013, Gene & Julie Gates took over mornings after Ron Chapman moved to co-owned classic hits KLUV.

Specialty programming during the "Lite FM" era included the "Sunday Jazz Brunch", a smooth jazz show hosted by Tempe Lindsey, formerly of KOAI "107.5 The Oasis" which was changed to Rhythmic AC "Movin' 107.5". It was cancelled as of September 27, 2009, and replaced with regular programming.

=== The New Sound of 103-7 KVIL ===
KVIL ident used from 2013 to 2015.

On May 2, 2013, KVIL-FM dropped the "Lite FM" branding in favor of using its call letters and re-positioned the station as "The Best Variety...90s, 2K & Today." It was marketed as "The New Sound of 103-7 KVIL" to attract a new generation of listeners.

Gene and Julie Gates initially had success in the ratings, but they were later replaced by Tony Zazza and Julie Fisk. Zazza & Fisk were released from the station in October 2014.

In mid-November 2001, KVIL flipped to an all-Christmas format that ran through Christmas Day. It followed this practice every holiday season until 2013. For 2011, the AC format returned on December 27 instead of December 26. With the format repositioning in May 2013, the all-Christmas format was moved to classic hits sister station KLUV, which started on November 15, 2013.

For many years, KVIL had been the Dallas affiliate of the syndicated Delilah nighttime love songs program. In early January 2014, the show was dropped with no public announcement of the change. On January 21, Blake Powers took over as the evening DJ for the station. Byron Harrell, programming director of CBS Radio in Dallas said in an email to DFW.com regarding the change, "We respect the level of talent and service Delilah provided the KVIL audience over the years, but it was time for a change at 103.7 as we continue to contemporize the sound of KVIL and focus our attention on the Dallas-Fort Worth metro." Months later, KVIL began leaning towards Adult Top 40. The station dropped the "90s, 2K and Today" slogan, along with the "Throwback Thursday" program that allowed listeners to vote for their favorite past hits, including a few songs from the late 1980s.

Despite this format retooling, KVIL-FM was still listed with an adult contemporary format by Mediabase until May 2, 2014, when KVIL was moved to the "Hot AC" panel full-time, leaving the immediate Dallas/Fort Worth market without an Adult Contemporary station. iHeartMedia officially launched a Mainstream AC format on KDGE as "Star 102.1" on December 26, 2016. The lone competitor in the Hot AC era was iHeartMedia-owned KDMX.

=== More Hits, Less Commercials ===
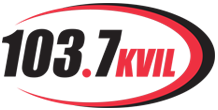
KVIL logo used from 2015 to 2017.

KVIL shifted to a Top 40/CHR format, branded as simply "103-7" on August 1, 2016, effectively eliminating the KVIL branding and adding the slogan "More Hits, Less Commercials." The station pledged to have 50 minutes of music every hour. This followed the URL registration of 'MoreHits1037.com'.

On October 5, 2016, Mediabase moved KVIL to the Top 40/CHR panel effective with the October 14, 2016, edition. That marked the station's return to the Top 40 format for the first time in 47 years.

=== Amp 103-7 ===
Amp 103-7 logo used from January to November 2017.

On January 18, 2017, at 7 a.m., after playing "Heathens" by Twenty One Pilots, KVIL reinforced its focus on CHR by rebranding again, this time as "Amp 103-7", adopting the moniker from sister CBS stations KAMP-FM in Los Angeles, WODS in Boston, WQMP in Orlando, WDZH in Detroit and WBMP in New York City. The first song to play on "Amp" was "Closer" by The Chainsmokers.

Unlike other CBS-owned CHRs, KVIL leaned more toward adults, and was essentially a hybrid of the Mainstream Top 40 and Adult Top 40 formats, much like sister WWMX in Baltimore. It competed head-on with iHeartMedia-owned KHKS, Cumulus-owned KLIF-FM, and to an extent, iHeartMedia-owned KDMX. Like KVIL's Top 40 format in its first incarnation, Amp did not last long.

=== Alt 103.7 ===
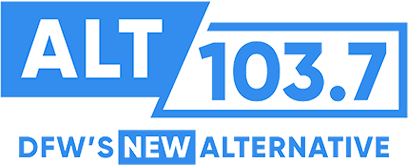
"Alt 103.7" logo under previous color and slogan

On February 2, 2017, CBS Radio announced it would merge with Entercom (now known as Audacy). The merger was approved on November 9, 2017, and was consummated on November 17. At 10 a.m. on November 17, after playing "Sorry" by Justin Bieber, followed by a commercial break, KVIL flipped to alternative rock, branded as "Alt 103.7." The first song on "Alt" was "Lonely Boy" by The Black Keys.

The flip put KVIL in competition with iHeartMedia's active rock-formatted KEGL, along with North Texas Public Broadcasting's Adult album alternative-formatted KKXT, as well as college radio station KNTU and iHeartMedia-owned KEGL-HD2; the flip also returned the format to the market after KEGL's sister station KDGE (which moved the format to KEGL-HD2) dropped alternative exactly one year earlier to the day when it flipped to Christmas music on November 17, 2016, and then Adult Contemporary after Christmas. A similar move also occurred in New York City with sister station WBMP (now WINS-FM) dropping the Top 40/CHR format and flipping to alternative that same day. This followed a trend of Entercom stations switching to the "Alt" branding that would later include KITS in San Francisco (which flipped to adult hits, later returned back to alternative as "Live 105" once again) and WQMP in Orlando (which would rebrand, and has since changed formats), KRBZ in Kansas City (which later flipped to sports), KXTE in Las Vegas (which was sold to Beasley Broadcast Group in 2022, and flipped to a hybrid hot talk/alternative format), KBZT in San Diego, and KKDO in Sacramento, along with many others.

In September 2020, Entercom laid off many DJs at its alternative stations, including KVIL morning host Mark Schechtman and afternoon host Ian Camfield, and replaced them with syndicated shows from other cities. At KVIL, the Stryker & Klein show from KROQ in Los Angeles began airing in mornings, the Church of Lazlo from KRBZ in Kansas City aired in afternoons, and Kevan Kenney and Bryce Segall from WNYL in New York aired in evenings and overnights, respectively. These changes resulted in the station's ratings dropping to record lows. In November 2021, the station dropped the syndicated morning and afternoon shows in favor of music.

== HD Radio ==
=== KVIL HD2 ===
When KVIL-FM began broadcasting a digital subchannel in HD Radio, it launched "Chick Rock" (Rock for Women) on KVIL-HD2 (103.7 MHz HD2). It played rock music from female artists such as Alanis Morissette, Sheryl Crow, and Joan Jett. Two years later in 2008, the format was changed to Christian rock as "Rise". During its tenure and KVIL's run as an adult contemporary station, KVIL-HD2 would periodically flip to Christmas music from the first of November to the middle of the month when KVIL and KVIL-HD2 would swap their formats for the holiday season until the day after Christmas Day when the stations would swap back. Christmas music would run a few more days on KVIL-HD2 before resuming normal operations as "Rise" on New Year's Eve.

After KVIL retooled its AC format to Hot AC-leaning fare in May 2013, the Christmas music was ultimately passed to sister classic hits station KLUV, while "Rise" continued to broadcast throughout the holiday season. KVIL-HD2 did, however, introduce a one-time seasonal format for the 2014 summer as "NTX Honda Fever" with 'Freddie Fever' as the DJ and the regional North Texas Honda Dealer as its sponsor. It aired a Variety hits playlist that combined Adult Top 40 and Classic Hits music. The format lasted through the end of September before KVIL-HD2 resumed its "Rise" broadcasts.

On October 7, 2015, KVIL-HD2 jettisoned its Christian rock format and flipped to smooth jazz as "The Oasis 103.7 HD2", which was relocated from sister station KMVK's HD2 channel. Previously, co-owned KMVK's HD2 sub-channel carried smooth jazz from the days when KOAI and KMVK's main channel called itself "The Oasis". Sometime in July 2017, "The Oasis" was retooled to have an expanded jazz playlist and live personalities. While the focus was still on smooth jazz, The Oasis rebranded itself as a "Modern Jazz" station. KVIL-HD2's programming was also heard on Audacy's platform.

On January 11, 2024, Audacy ceased operations of "The Oasis" and moved its in-house LGBTQ+ talk and EDM-formatted network "Channel Q" programming from KVIL-HD3 to KVIL-HD2. With the addition of Dallas in years past, Channel Q is heard in the nation's five largest radio markets and currently competes with Pride Radio on KHKS 106.1 HD2. "The Oasis" on the Audacy platform has been replaced largely in function with the company's similarly-formatted "Soundscapes".

=== KVIL HD3 ===
On June 3, 2019, KVIL-HD3 was launched and became the Dallas-Ft. Worth Metroplex home for Radio.com's LGBTQ+ talk and EDM-formatted network "Channel Q." The channel stayed on the HD3 spot until January 11, 2024, when Channel Q was moved to KVIL's HD2 slot, and the HD3 signal was shut down, leaving no programming replacement.
