= Eneslow =

NYC-based specialty custom-made shoe company

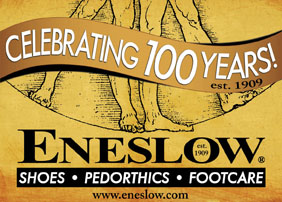
- Industry: Design and manufacture of shoes and foot products
- Founded: 1909
- Headquarters: New York City, New York, United States
- Area served: United States
- Key people: Robert S. Schwartz
- Products: Ready-made shoes, custom shoes, foot products, custom orthotics
- Revenue: US$ 8 million (2009)
- Number of employees: 55 (2010)
- Website: www.eneslow.com/

Eneslow (pronounced N-S-LOW, /ɛn.ɛs.loʊ/) is a chain of shoe stores in New York City founded by the Low family in 1909. They are America’s largest pedorthic retailer. In addition to its retail stores, Eneslow also manages the Eneslow Pedorthic Institute, a pedorthic education and training program.

== History ==
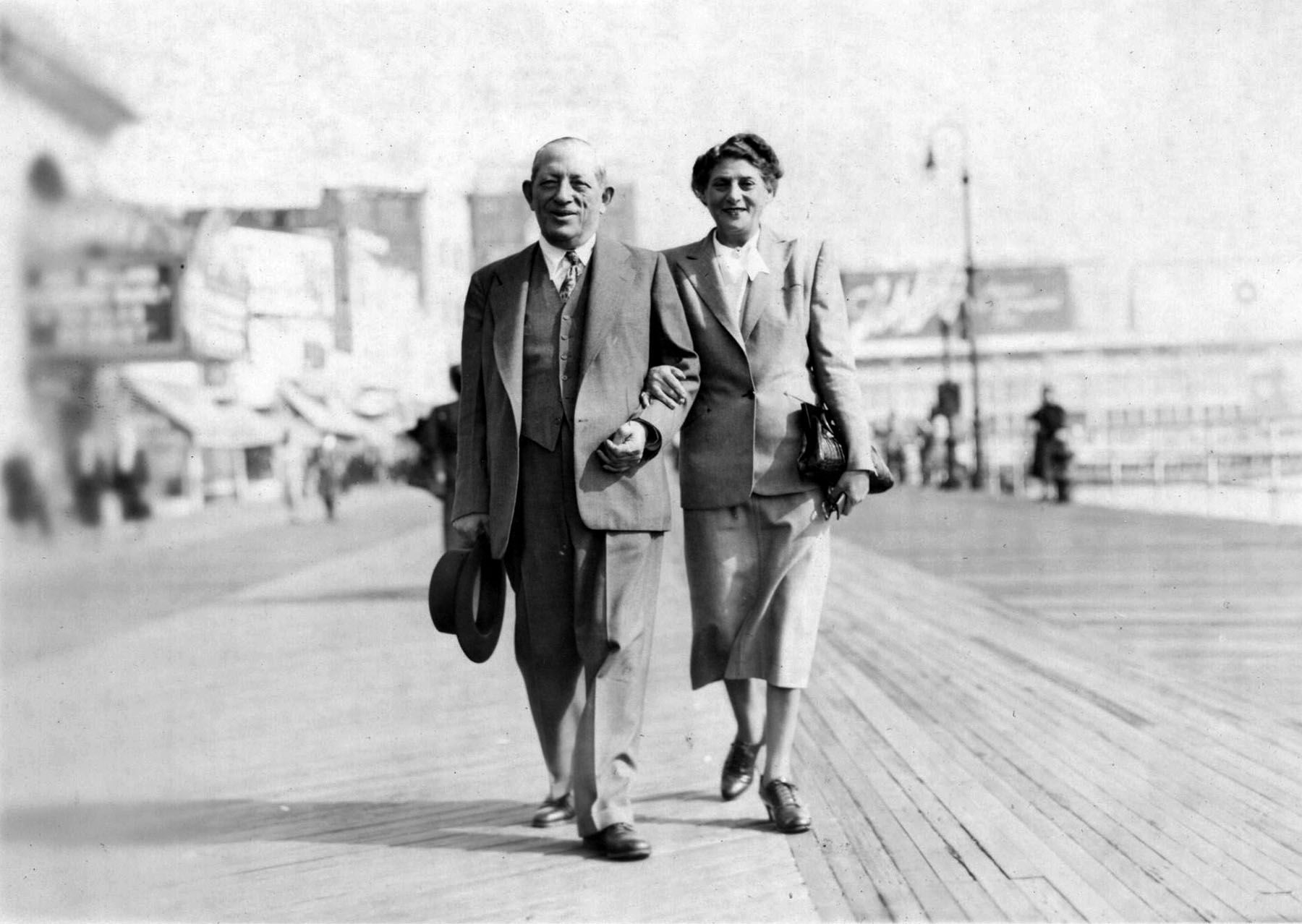
Ed and Nellie Stone Low

=== Early years ===
Eneslow, originally known N.S. Low, was founded by Edward and Nellie Stone Low in 1909, selling trusses surgical products and shoes on Avenue A. In 1914, Nat Low joined Edward Low, and the business was incorporated. The shoe department flourished and by 1926 the shoe department became so big they decided to make it its own company – Eneslow. The shoe department introduction had been possible because Sol joined Eneslow. The same year, Eneslow moved to 220 East 23rd Street.

By the 1940s, the company had attracted the attention of Paul Schwartz, who was a custom orthotics maker, and who owned the wholesale business Apex Foot Health Industries, which sold foot products, particularly orthotics and arch supports. As a wholesaler, he sold his products to Eneslow. His goal was to have a package of feet, orthotics and shoes as a one-stop shop.

=== 1968-1999 ===
In 1968, Paul and Charles Schwartz bought the company Eneslow and moved its headquarters to 695 6th Avenue. At that time, Eneslow had two other locations, one in Brooklyn since 1949 and one in the Bronx since 1937. In 1973, Robert S. Schwartz joined Eneslow after a 10-year career in sales and marketing. In 1975, Robert S. Schwartz and his brother Richard B. Schwartz, each owned 50 percent of Eneslow and Apex. By the mid-1980s, when he and his brother, Richard, split the company he became the sole owner of the retail division and turned Eneslow into a regional chain with eight stores. But when New York State slashed Medicaid reimbursements for medical shoes and orthotics, the company lost 50 percent of its business and Schwartz shut all but his flagship store located at 924 Broadway, NYC.

In 1983, the two businesses – Eneslow and Apex – were split; Robert S. Schwartz bought out Richard B. Schwartz to get full ownership. In 1985, Eneslow bought Classic Mold Shoe Company, makers of custom molded and custom orthopedic dress shoes and sandals and merged it into the company. In 1995, Eneslow Pedorthic Institute (EPI) was founded by Dr. Justin Wernick, DPM and Robert S. Schwartz, C.Ped.

=== 2001-present ===
In 2003, the company bought a retail store from Selby Fifth Avenue at Horace Harding Expressway in Little Neck, Queens; changed its name to Eneslow and opened its second store. In 2006, the company moved its long-time 924 Broadway headquarters location to Park Avenue South at 32nd Street. In 2009 Eneslow opened a third store on the Upper East Side of Manhattan on Second Avenue between 78th and 79th streets.

In 2016, Michael and Rachel Schwartz – son and daughter of Robert Schwartz – are in the business with him, and as the next generation of Schwartz's are celebrating both 50 years of Schwartz Family ownership and 110 years of Eneslow. In 2019 Eneslow opened its current flagship location at 1319 Third Avenue between 75th and 76th Street.

== Education ==
Eneslow's education efforts mainly target two audiences:

- people who mostly stand or walk while working
- those who can diagnose walking disorders, or prescribe or repair specialized shoes.
  - The Eneslow Pedorthic Institute (EPI) was founded in 1995 by Eneslow and Dr. Justin Wernick, DPM and CEO Robert S. Schwartz for the design, manufacture, modification, and proper fit of shoes and foot orthoses. EPI hosts pedorthic courses, conventions and seminars. The institute trains pedorthists, drawing students from around the world. In addition to pre-certification courses, it offers reviews for the pre-certification exam and teaches certified shoe-fitter courses. Podiatry students and orthopedic surgeons have attended the institute. The classes, which are accredited by the American Board for Certification in Orthotics, Prosthetics and Pedorthics (ABC) and the Board of Certification/Accreditation, International (BOC), as pedorthic pre-certification courses, are taught by Robert S. Schwartz, C.Ped. and Eneslow staff and pedorthists, podiatrists, orthopedic surgeons, physical therapists, endocrinologists, shoe designers and diabetes educators.
  - Their custom department and shoe modification does structural and cosmetic modifications to all kinds of shoes; orthotics are fabricated as well.

== Charitable activity ==
Eneslow is a supporter of the charity Soles4Souls. Eneslow also provides free footwear, socks, and insoles for relief workers, disaster victims, and the homeless.
