= Yūko Mita =

Japanese actress (born 1954)

- 三田 ゆう子
- Born: Yūko Iguchi; August 14, 1954 (age 72); Setagaya, Tokyo, Japan
- Education: Seisen University
- Occupations: Actress; voice actress
- Years active: 1976–present
- Agent: Aoni Production
- Website: Official profile

Yūko Mita (三田 ゆう子, Mita Yūko; born Yūko Iguchi (井口 友子, Iguchi Yūko), August 14, 1954) is a Japanese actress and voice actress from Setagaya, Tokyo. She is known for playing gentle, sexy bishōjo (such as Akemi Roppongi in Maison Ikkoku) as well as many young boys roles. Her hobbies include tennis and skiing. She is employed by the talent management firm Aoni Production.

== Filmography ==
=== Television animation ===
- Anmitsu Hime (Amaguri no Suke)
- Aishite Night (Hashizō)
- Akuma-kun (Akuma-kun)
- Anpanman (Eclair-san, Bananaman, Popo, Penguin-kun)
- Battle Athletes Victory ReSTART! (Stella Rosnovsky)
- Captain Tsubasa (Andre)
- Cinderella Monogatari (Palette)
- City Hunter (Sayaka Isegami (Ep. 10))
- Detective Conan (Kazuki Kinukawa)
- Dr. Slump (Turbo, Tsururin Tsun)
- Dragon Ball (Turbo)
- Dragon Ball Z Special 1: Bardock, The Father of Goku (Selypa)
- Dragon Quest (Daisy)
- Edokko Boy Gatten Tasuke (Bonten Marutasuke, Daisuke)
- Fighting Foodons (Pitan)
- GeGeGe no Kitarō (3rd series) (Neko Musume)
- GeGeGe no Kitarō (4th series) (Ubume)
- Gu Gu Ganmo (Linda)
- Guru Guru Town Hanamaru-kun (Mother)
- Hello! Lady Lin (Sophy)
- Highschool! Kimen-gumi (Ippei Kawa)
- Hoka Hoka Kazoku (Midori Yamano)
- The Irresponsible Captain Tylor (Shia Has)
- The Kabocha Wine (Akemi (ep.94), Kōhei)
- Konjiki no Gash Bell!! (Sekkoro)
- Little Lulu and Her Little Friends (Willie)
- Magic Idol Pastel Yumi (Momoko Hanazono)
- Magic Star Magical Emi (Misaki Kazuki)
- Magical Angel Creamy Mami (Posi)
- Magical Fairy Persia (Puri Puri, Tsutomu (young))
- Magical Princess Minky Momo (Pipiru)
- Maison Ikkoku (Akemi Roppongi)
- Maple Town Stories (Cindy, Karl)
- Mirai Robo Daltanious (Ochame)
- Ninja Hattori-kun (Shinzō Hattori)
- Norakuro-kun (Keita Kinoshita)
- Obake no Q-tarō (P-ko)
- One Piece (Charlotte Brulee, Young Vinsmoke Niji)
- Plawres Sanshiro (Aya)
- Pokonyan! (Pokonyan)
- Pocket Monsters: Episode Gold & Silver (Ibuki)
- Pocket Monsters: Diamond and Pearl (Kengo)
- Pocket Monsters: Best Wishes! Season 2: Decolora Adventure (Ibuki)
- Ranma ½ (Madame Sanpōru, Ori)
- Robin Hood no Daibōken (Will)
- Sailor Moon (Higure Akiyama)
- Sasuga no Sarutobi (Mika Ishikawa)
- Shin Bikkuriman (Saracchi)
- Soar High! Isami (Kei Tsukikage)
- Stitch! ~Best Friends Forever~ (Brag/Flute)
- Stop! Hibari-kun (Jun)
- Super Bikkuriman (Rock Princess Dinas)
- Super Doll★Licca-chan (Dai Takabayashi)
- Tokimeki Tonight (Tsuppari)
- Ultra B (Ultra B)
- Urusei Yatsura (Benten, Kaede (Ep. 55 & spring special), Juliet (Ep. 17))
- YAT Anshin! Uchū Ryokō (Bukkī, MAM, Tsuyoko, others)

=== Original video animation (OVA) ===
- Dominion (Annapuma)
- Dream Dimension Hunter Fandora (Sōto)
- Get Going! Godzilland (Godzilla)
- Magical Princess Minky Momo: Yume no Naka no Rondo (Pipiru)
- Ningen Kakumei (Ikue Toda)
- Tenamonya Voyagers (Space Trash Paraila)
- Urusei Yatsura (Benten)
- Vampire Wars (Brigit)

=== Theatrical animation ===
- Let's Go! Anpanman: The Lyrical Magical Witch's School (Popo)
- Crayon Shin-chan: The Storm Called: The Adult Empire Strikes Back (Young Hiroshi Nohara)
- Maison Ikkoku Kanketsuhen (Akemi Roppongi)
- Make-Up! Sailor Senshi (Katarina)
- Ninja Hattori-kun: Nin Nin Ninpō Enikki no Maki (Shinzō Hattori)
- Pokonyan! Kyūryū ga Ugoitanyan (Pokonyan)
- Urusei Yatsura (Benten)
- A Wind Named Amnesia (Sue)

=== Video games ===
- Abalaburn (Rose, Aquila/Yura)
- Gensō Senshi Valis (Reiko)
- Sentimental Graffiti 2 (Emiko Sugihara)
- Dragon Ball Z Budokai Tenkaichi 3 (Selypa)
- Kono Yo no Hate de Koi wo Utau Shōjo YU-NO (Amanda)

=== Tokusatsu ===
- Tetsuwan Tantei Robotack (Mog-Lucky)

=== Drama CDs ===
- Saint Elza Crusaders (Manami Oguri)

== Dubbing ==
- The Adventures of Buckaroo Banzai Across the 8th Dimension, John Emdall (Rosalind Cash)
- Babar (TV series) (Young Babar)
- TUGS (Sunshine)
- Noddy's Toyland Adventures (Noddy)
- Budgie The Little Helicopter (Pippa Patsy and Enivieve)
- Special Books by Special Kids (Sophia Weaver)

== Other ==
- Shin Dotchi no Ryōri Show (Yellow Kitchen "Which-kun" (voice))
