= List of Maison Ikkoku characters =

From left; Kentaro Ichinose (back), Soichiro the dog, Kyoko Otonashi, Yusaku Godai, Akemi Roppongi, Yotsuya (back), Hanae Ichinose

The Maison Ikkoku manga series features characters created by Rumiko Takahashi. Many of the characters live in the series' titular boarding house, including the protagonists Yusaku Godai and Kyoko Otonashi. The boarding house setting and its tenants were inspired from Takahashi's college years; the apartment house behind her own was occupied by many "strange people."

== Creation and conception ==
Takahashi stated that she had wanted to draw a story about an apartment complex for some time, inspired by the one she lived in in Nakano, Tokyo during college and the odd actions of the people living in the one next door. She originally only wanted to start the series focusing on Kyoko and Godai's relationship before moving on to include the other tenants to have a "human drama," but said the love story attracted her more and took over.

She said that she adds new characters when she needs new story ideas, but remarked that the apartment setting of Maison Ikkoku limited her from adding too many. Takahashi said that when creating characters she roughly knows their "nature" while designing them, but not the details.

The characters' names involve puns on numbers, with those of the Maison Ikkoku tenants utilizing their room numbers.

Number	Character	Kanji of family name and meaning
0 (無)	Kyoko Otonashi (née Chigusa)	音無 (soundless)
1 (一)	The Ichinose Family	一の瀬 (first ford)
2 (二)	Nozomi Nikaido	二階堂 (two-story temple)
3 (三)	Shun Mitaka *	三鷹 (three hawks)
4 (四)	Mr. Yotsuya	四谷 (four valleys)
5 (五)	Yusaku Godai	五代 (five generations)
6 (六)	Akemi Roppongi	六本木 (six trees)
7 (七)	Kozue Nanao *	七尾 (seven ridges; the second character is "tail" but "Nanao" itself is a name from Ishikawa Prefecture)
8 (八)	Ibuki Yagami *	八神 (eight gods)
9 (九)	Asuna Kujo *	九条 (ninth avenue; the name is an old Japanese aristocratic name)
1000 (千)	Mr. & Mrs. Chigusa *	千草 (thousand grasses)

(* Not residents of Maison Ikkoku.)

== Maison Ikkoku residents ==
=== Yusaku Godai ===
Yusaku Godai (五代 裕作, Godai Yūsaku) is the main character of the series. He begins as a poor 19-year-old rōnin studying for his college entrance exams after failing in the past year. He eventually gets into a third-tier college (with Kyoko's support). He is kindhearted and handsome, but indecisive and spacey. Godai is often "played" by the other tenants of Ikkoku, who habitually take advantage of him (e.g. they use his room for frequent drinking binges and steal food from his care packages). He falls in love with Kyoko at first sight, but initially lacks the courage (when sober at least) to tell her how he feels. Instead, he daydreams a lot and does several silly things (for example, he runs into road posts). But Godai is an honorable man who is worthy of Kyoko, as his love for her is a lasting and devoted love. He has, several times, tried making a move on Kyoko, but could not bring himself to do so; such actions make Kyoko think of him as a perfect gentleman. At the end, he marries her, and Godai and Kyoko finally found happiness and have a daughter, which they give the name Haruka Godai (五代春香, Godai Haruka). He is voiced by Issei Futamata in the Japanese anime, and by Jason Gray-Stanford (eps. 1–36) and Brad Swaile (eps. 37–96) in the English version. He is portrayed by Ken Ishiguro in the 1986 film and Taiki Nakabayashi in a 2007 TV film.

=== Kyoko Otonashi ===
Kyoko Otonashi (音無 響子, Otonashi Kyōko; née Chigusa) is the heroine of the series. She is a beautiful widow who takes on the task of managing a broken-down boarding house. She is sweet and polite, but also has a violent, frightening side that emerges when she is jealous or angry, or dealing with her meddling and equally stubborn parents. She soon develops affection for Godai, and has a tendency to dote over him (with the other tenants teasing her for acting like a "good wife") and becomes jealous over him (though she lies to herself and denies that it is jealousy). However, it is hard for her to forget about her late husband Soichiro (who died just six months after their wedding), and her memories of her husband sometimes put her in a melancholy mood. Kyoko's love for him is sometimes reflected in dialogues with her dog, who bears the same name as her late husband. She believes Godai to be pure-hearted and not a pervert, unlike the other tenants, who try warning her about him. At the end, she is happily married to Godai and a new mother to their daughter Haruka. She is voiced by Sumi Shimamoto in the Japanese anime, and by Ellen Kennedy in the English version. She is played by Mariko Ishihara in the 1986 film and Misaki Ito in the 2007 TV film. Otonashi literally means "without a sound," but is also a pun on otto-nashi (夫なし), or "without a husband," in reference to her status as a widow.

=== Hanae Ichinose ===
Hanae Ichinose (一の瀬 花枝, Ichinose Hanae) is a short, middle-aged woman who is rarely seen sober and who loves gossip, relishing her room's proximity to the communal telephone. Her wage-slave husband seldom appears and is completely unknown to the other tenants until he gets temporarily laid off. She enjoys joining in with the other tenants to stir up trouble for Yusaku and Kyoko, but she occasionally acts with good intentions for the two, especially Kyoko, whom she sees as a "younger sister" (willfully ignoring the difference in their ages, as the other tenants point out). However, even when she is acting with the best of intentions, her way of doing things often leaves Yūsaku, Kyoko, or both in a worse situations than if she had not gotten involved. She is voiced by Kazuyo Aoki in the Japanese anime, and by Daphne Goldrick (eps. 1–36) and Kathy Morse (eps. 37–96) in the English version. She is portrayed by Yumiko Fujita in the 1986 film and Kayoko Kishimoto in the 2007 TV film.

=== Yotsuya ===
Yotsuya (四谷) is a mysterious man who finds enjoyment in mooching, voyeurism, and generally tormenting his next-door neighbor Yusaku; he is famous for breaking a hole through the adjoining wall (and to use a smaller hole in the wall of Yusaku's room to peep into Akemi's). He is usually seen dressed in a business suit, a yukata or similarly formal attire and tends to speak in a very formal manner (even while drinking and partying with Akemi and Mrs. Ichinose), but what life he may have outside of Maison Ikkoku is a complete mystery to everyone. Yotsuya claims to have a job (but is not above stealing Yusaku's food) and comes and goes at odd and changing hours, keeping a schedule known only to himself. He torments Yusaku directly and Kyoko indirectly, as it is her job to repair the damage done by him. Yotsuya is willing to reveal the secrets of others if it benefits him, such as telling Kyoko what Godai does at night, in order to prevent the hole from being repaired. He is voiced by Shigeru Chiba in the Japanese anime, and by Gerard Plunkett (eps. 1–36) and Ron Halder (eps. 37–96) in the English version. He is portrayed by Masatō Ibu in the 1986 film and Ittoku Kishibe in the 2007 TV film. Yotsuya means "four valleys" and is the name of a district in Tokyo associated with a famous ghost story. It has been speculated among fans that Yotsuya is one and the same as the character Sekoi in another Rumiko Takahashi manga titled Dust-spurt. In it, Sekoi is a secret agent working for the HCIA ("Hinomaru Central Intelligence Agency").

=== Akemi Roppongi ===
Akemi Roppongi (六本木 朱美, Roppongi Akemi) is a boozy bar hostess who is known to lounge around wearing skimpy lingerie while hanging around Ikkoku. Akemi works a short distance away in a bar named Cha-Cha Maru, where the tenants gather to drink when not in Yusaku's room. She is known to let some of the bar's male patrons buy her too many drinks, and often comes home from work drunk. Because she works the late-night shift at the Cha-Cha Maru and spends the rest of the night drinking, Akemi always seems to have a sleepy look on her face. She is generally aloof towards both Yusaku and Kyoko, but she is not above joining Yotsuya in tormenting Yusaku. Akemi will often display a blatant sexual interest in Shun Mitaka when he is around, even though she is fully aware of his interest in Kyoko. At the end of the series, she ends up marrying her boss and lives with him on the second floor of the Cha-Cha Maru. Her family name, which means "six trees," is also the name of a Tokyo district, infamous for expensive hostess bars. She is voiced by Yūko Mita in the Japanese anime, and by Janyse Jaud in the English version. She is portrayed by Yoshiko Miyazaki in the 1986 film and Yumiko Takahashi in the 2007 TV film.

=== Kentaro Ichinose ===
Kentaro Ichinose (一の瀬 賢太郎, Ichinose Kentarō) begins the story as grade-school-aged brat, generally seen trying to get between his mother and her alcohol. Initially, he is antagonistic towards Yusaku, but events soon see him to look upon Yusaku as an "alright guy". He is also very fond of Kyoko, especially because he sees her as the only sane person in the building other than himself. He develops a crush on Kyoko's niece Ikuko, reminding Yusaku of himself, although Kentaro resents the comparison. He is voiced by Chika Sakamoto in the Japanese anime, and by Saffron Henderson (eps. 1–36) and Sharon Alexander (eps. 37–96) in the English version. He is portrayed by Katsuhasa Nakagaki in the 1986 film and Shinosuke Matsukawa, Ren Nibori (younger) in the 2007 TV film.

=== Mr. Ichinose ===
Mr. Ichinose (一の瀬氏, Ichinose-shi) is Hanae Ichinose's husband that only appears occasionally in the series. He is a hard-working salaryman and unlike his wife, he is polite and does not get out of hand when he drinks. He is voiced by Minoru Yada in the Japanese anime, and by Campbell Lane (eps. 1–36) and Robert O. Smith (eps. 37–96) in the English version.

=== Nozomi Nikaido ===
Nozomi Nikaido (二階堂 望, Nikaidō Nozomi) originally intended to move into an upscale establishment called "Rikkoku-kan", but a typographical error on the lease papers brings him to Maison Ikkoku relatively late into the story as an accidental tenant. He had led a rather sheltered life and moves into Maison Ikkoku, as he starts college, against the wishes of his protective mother. Nozomi initially strikes Kyoko as a very well-mannered boy, while most other tenants see him as a "sheltered mama's boy". Aside from his long-running vendetta against Yotsuya (Nozomi retaliates to Yotsuya's invasions, in contrast to Yusaku), he is known for being incredibly dense and is totally oblivious to the situation between Yusaku, Kyoko, and their respective love triangles. At the end of the series, Nozomi graduates from college and moves back home with his overbearing mother, but wishes to return to Maison Ikkoku. He does not appear in the television series but appears in The Final Chapter film where he is voiced by Ryō Horikawa. In the English release of the manga by Viz, the character's given name was originally translated as "Nozomu".

=== Zenzaburo Mitsukoshi ===
Zenzaburo Mitsukoshi (三越 善三郎, Mitsukoshi Zenzaburō) is an anime-only character whose exact intentions are left vague, but he appears to have been investigating Maison Ikkoku for a real estate development company wanting to buy it and build a new apartment complex on the ground. He decides that he likes the people living there, and ends his relationship with the development company. He stays in room 3 while living at Maison Ikkoku, and his name is the same as the large department store chain Mitsukoshi. The "Mitsu" in his name means "three". He is voiced by Katsunosuke Hori in the Japanese anime, and by Michael Donovan in the English version.

== Recurring characters ==
=== Shun Mitaka ===
Shun Mitaka (三鷹 瞬, Mitaka Shun), in sharp contrast to Yusaku, is wealthy, educated, and hails from an elite family. Mitaka works as a ladies' tennis coach more out of love for the sport than any need for financial support. To everyone's surprise, he is revealed to be 31 years old by his parents, which would mean he was 26 at the beginning of the series. Nevertheless, he is remarkably handsome, and his teeth have a trademark sparkle whenever he smiles. Kyoko begins to take tennis lessons from him early in the series, and Shun begins to court her. His biggest obstacle in the beginning is his morbid fear of dogs, which makes it difficult for him to be with Kyoko when her dog, Soichiro, is around. While very interested in and devoted to Kyoko, he is very popular with other women and has a reputation as a womanizer, a reputation not entirely undeserved (most of his more grievous actions have innocent explanations, but Shun has admitted to dating many women). Kyoko's mother strongly approves of him as a potential future husband for Kyoko (to Yusaku's chagrin).

Shun recognizes Yusaku as a rival for Kyoko's affection (and vice versa), and the two are usually antagonistic towards each other. Shun's actions towards Yusaku are somewhere between magnanimous and condescending, depending on if Kyoko is around, and he is not above trying to position Kozue as a wedge between Yusaku and Kyoko. But while Shun and Yusaku are rivals, they both share moments where they bond over their mutual frustration over Kyoko's reluctance to fall in love with anyone. Kyoko generally likes Shun and regards him as a suitor, but is apprehensive about his forwardness and occasionally feels pressured by him (Shun does not want to force a relationship with her, but will often "bend the rules"). It can be unclear whether Shun is interested more in Kyoko herself or in "saving" Kyoko from what he sees as a degrading life as a widow in Maison Ikkoku, putting him in the stereotypical role of the "knight in shining armor."

Shun marries Asuna Kujo, a girl from a wealthy, important family whom his parents want him to marry, after thinking he drunkenly slept with her and got her pregnant. However, it was actually his dog whom got one of her dogs pregnant. While to him it came about as a shotgun wedding, he does not seem to fully regret it and at the end of the series they have twin girls, Moe and Mie Mitaka, and another unborn child on the way. He is voiced by Akira Kamiya in the Japanese anime, and by John Payne in the English version.

=== Kozue Nanao ===
Kozue Nanao (七尾 こずえ, Nanao Kozue) is Yusaku's steady date ("girlfriend" may be too strong a word, at least in Yusaku's view) and generally serves as an obstacle for him in his pursuit of Kyoko. Cute, sweet, and a little scatter-brained, she's oblivious to the fact that she is more interested in Yusaku than he is in her, and she does not recognize Kyoko (or Ibuki) as competition for his affection. Their relationship starts after Kozue finds Yusaku with a spare movie ticket (originally intended for Kyoko, who had just started dating Shun) and she invites herself along, setting the general tone for their relationship. Yusaku would like to come forward and break things off with Kozue, however he cannot find the right opportunity to do so without hurting Kozue's feelings deeply. The situation becomes more complicated after Kozue introduces Yusaku to her family, who approve of him and are all too willing to feed the perpetually starving college student.

Kyoko does not dislike Kozue and always responds to Kozue's genuine friendliness in kind, but Kozue's relationship with Yusaku does trigger her jealousy (which she would not admit as such) and as a result he always takes pains to keep all mention of Kozue away from Kyoko. Yusaku does find Kozue attractive, and admits to himself that he would have fallen for her if Kyoko was not in the picture, but because of his feelings for Kyoko he strives to maintain some sort of distance from Kozue; his naivety (both feigned and genuine) keeps their relationship platonic. Another running gag in the series is Yusaku's many attempts to break off with his relationship with Kozue. He imagines putting himself in many degrading situations to make her hate him and break up with him. Ironically, this does happen when Kozue sees Yusaku escorting a very drunk Akemi out of a hotel although it was not Yusaku's intention at the time. Later on, she finds out what really happened and the two of them part ways peacefully. Kozue ends up marrying a co-worker, Kentaro, at the bank she works at and moves away to Nagoya with her new husband. She is voiced by Miina Tominaga in the Japanese anime, and by Rochelle Greenwood (eps. 1-36) and Anna Cummer (eps. 37–96) in the English version. Kozue is representative of the number seven, the kanji of Kozue's family name, Nana-o, literally meaning "seven tails". However, the kanji「尾」="tail" can also refer to「尾根」="mountain ridge," and the place name Nana-o occurs in Ishikawa-prefecture where the scenery is dominated by seven mountain ridges.

=== Asuna Kujo ===
Asuna Kujo (九条 明日菜, Kujō Asuna) is a classically demure Japanese maiden from a wealthy family (Kujō family implied), Asuna is pretty, kindhearted, shy around people, and innocent to a fault. Her family and Shun's uncle have arranged a traditional Japanese marriage between her and Shun, against Shun's wishes. In contrast to Shun, Asuna is a dog lover and she is initially attracted to Shun because her many dogs seem to approve of him. Shun would like to end their arranged engagement, but often finds himself unable to, either because of his fear of her dogs or his fear of hurting her feelings (mirroring the situation between Yūsaku and Kozue). However, after the engagement, a remark by Asuna that his smile seems forced (as in a photograph when he got second place at a tennis competition) makes Shun realize that she is a very empathic and compassionate woman whom he can be happy with. Asuna is initially unaware of Shun's feelings for Kyoko, but she is not above pursuing Shun, albeit in her own fashion. At the end of the series, Asuna marries Shun Mitaka and has twin girls, Moe and Mie, and a third child on the way. She is voiced by Hiromi Tsuru in the Japanese anime, and by Valerie Sing Turner in the English version. Asuna's family name, Kujō, roughly corresponds to "Ninth Avenue" in Kyoto, and is from the old city subdivision of Heian-kyō. The name implies that she is a member of the ancient aristocratic Fujiwara clan. As the Fujiwara clan became numerous and split up into many sub-families, each sub-family adopted the address of their respective mansions in Kyoto as their family name.

=== Ibuki Yagami ===
Ibuki Yagami (八神 いぶき, Yagami Ibuki) is a high school student where Yusaku was briefly a student-teacher (which is the same school Kyoko attended and met Soichiro). Ibuki was at first unimpressed with him, even ridiculing one of her classmates for her short-lived crush on Yusaku, but Ibuki develops her own crush after misinterpreting him as a sort of tragic romantic hero. Even after she spends more time around Yusaku, her feelings for him persist even after his tenure at her school ends. Ibuki tends to hatch devious plots that put her together with Yusaku, usually putting him into a compromising situation. Yusaku is not interested in her, but is a pushover about it as always, and Ibuki refuses to be denied.

Kyoko at first lets Ibuki play out what Kyoko sees as a simple schoolgirl crush, even acting on occasion to "protect Ibuki from Yusaku," but eventually sides with him when it becomes clear that he is the one that needs protection. After getting to know Ibuki, Kyoko realizes that Ibuki is much more brazen about her feelings than she ever was with Soichiro. But Kyoko is continually frustrated with what she perceives as Yusaku's unwillingness to assert himself, as with Kozue. Also, she cannot help but feel jealous, but then feels mortified for being jealous of a high school girl. Ibuki, on the other hand, initially sees Kyoko as a role model for marrying her own high school teacher, but later comes to recognize "that widow" as a rival for Yusaku's affections and often confronts her, she even pushes Kyoko to admit her love for Yusaku, and calls her a coward when she refuses to do so. However, when she found out the reason why Kyoko refused to admit that she loved Yusaku, she became less competitive with her and even went to the extent of strengthening her senior's relationship with her former teacher. At the end of the series Ibuki is attending an all-girls college still hanging unto the dream that she can be with Yusaku Godai. Ibuki's family name means "eight gods". She is voiced by Yuriko Fuchizaki in the Japanese anime, and by Alexandra Carter in the English version.

=== Soichiro Otonashi ===
Soichiro Otonashi (音無 惣一郎, Otonashi Sōichirō) is Kyoko's deceased husband. Kyoko and Soichiro met during high school when she was a student there and he was a temporary teacher. They eventually married, albeit with great opposition from Kyoko's family. After just six months from wedding, Soichiro died of seemingly a traffic accident where he was the co-driver (surviving the crash, but dying before reaching the hospital), leaving Kyoko as a very young widow. Apparently Kyoko was the one who mourned Soichiro's passing the most, even more than his parents.

His face is never shown in the series, always either in shadow or otherwise obscured in photographs. Soichiro's family, especially his father, is still very close to Kyoko, who still holds on to the Otonashi family name. The name Otonashi translates literally as "without sound", and Sōichirō literally, as "all one", and means "most important". He is voiced by Hideyuki Tanaka in the Japanese anime, and by David Kaye in the English version.

Mr. Soichiro (惣一郎さん, Sōichirō-san) is a large, white Samoyed, found as a stray by Soichiro Otonashi. He was originally named "Shiro" ("Whitey"), but he only responds to the name "Soichiro" and so Kyoko insists on calling him such in memory of her husband. Other than providing comic relief, he serves to remind both Kyoko and Yusaku of the man he was named after, and serves as a foil to Shun Mitaka. Kentaro enjoys playing with him and considers him his pet. In Ranma ½, volume 7, page 158, Soichiro's name appears on a box saying "Please take me home. My name is Soichiro" while Happosai is hiding under it. He is voiced by Shigeru Chiba in the Japanese anime.

=== Otonashi family ===
Ikuko Otonashi (音無 郁子, Otonashi Ikuko) and is Kyoko's young niece from her marriage to Soichiro. On a visit to Maison Ikkoku, Ikuko meets Yusaku and quickly becomes fond of him. Ikuko insists that Yusaku becomes her tutor as she approaches entry into high school, though it seems she is more interested in goofing off with him rather than actually studying. Kyoko initially tries to dissuade Ikuko and later tends to hover when the two are together, hoping to keep Yusaku from corrupting Ikuko with his lazy habits, although it is usually Ikuko who steers conversation away from her studies and more towards gossip. Tutoring Ikuko becomes Yusaku's first steady source of income as well as his first major attempt to demonstrate his maturity and reliability to Kyoko. She is voiced by Mayumi Shō in the Japanese anime, and by Andrea Libman (eps. 1-36) & Nicole Bouma (eps. 37–96) in the English version. Ikuko's mother, voiced by Atsuko Mine, makes several appearances throughout the series.

Mr. Otonashi (音無老人, Otonashi-rōjin; literally "Elder Otonashi") is the owner of Maison Ikkoku, Soichiro's father and Kyoko's former father-in-law. The chairman of the trustees of a girls' high school and a kind-hearted man who loves Kyoko like a daughter and later helps Yusaku get the chance to practice teaching. He is voiced by Ryūji Saikachi in the Japanese anime, and by Terry Klassen in the English version.

=== Yukari Godai ===
Yukari Godai (五代 ゆかり, Godai Yukari) is Yusaku's grandmother. She usually lives with Yusaku's parents out in the country in the Godai family restaurant, but she occasionally comes to visit her grandson in Tokyo. Akemi, Mrs. Ichinose and Yotsuya love when she visits as she always joins them in their drinking, however Grandma Godai does not torment Yusaku in quite the same way. She truly cares for her grandson, recognizes his situation with Kyoko, and her schemes are ultimately constructive for the two of them. She is voiced by Hisako Kyōda in the Japanese anime, and by Pauline Newstone in the English version.

=== Chigusa family ===
Mr. Chigusa (千草氏, Chigusa-ji) and Ritsuko Chigusa (千草律子, Chigusa Ritsuko) are Kyoko's parents. Initially against Kyoko's marriage to Soichiro, they (especially her mother) wish to see their daughter continue her life, preferably remarrying. Ritsuko is quite taken with Shun and sees him as a suitable husband for her daughter, while Kyoko's father sees the handsome Shun as a potential womanizer who will only break his "little girl's" heart. Neither of them seem to notice Yusaku's existence, including their inability to remember his name, let alone the bond both he and Kyoko share. However, later on Ritsuko shows some support for Godai since she wants Kyoko to remarry and Shun is no longer an option to Kyoko (Shun had married Asuna), although Mr. Chigusa disapproves of him for a little longer. Mr. Chigusa is voiced by Kōsei Tomita in the Japanese anime, and by Robert O. Smith in the English version. Ritsuko Chigusa is voiced by Minori Matsushima in the Japanese anime, and by Kathleen Barr in the English version.

=== Master of Chachamaru ===
Master of Chachamaru (茶々丸のマスター, Chachamaru no Masutā) is the owner of the bar Chachamaru and Akemi's boss who is never named; the owner of a bar is referred to as its "master." Initially an incidental character when the tenants of Maison Ikkoku go someplace other than Yusaku's room to drink, he is often seen complaining when the tenants are trashing the furniture, scaring away other patrons, or specifically when Akemi seems to be taking her own drinks rather than serving them to others. Later, the owner occasionally acts as the voice of reason, all too often being the only sober person in the room when something important happens, whether the other characters are either drunk on alcohol (Akemi, Mrs. Ichinose, Yotsuya), their own strong emotions (Kyoko and Yusaku), or a mixture of the two. He tolerates Akemi's obvious incompetence as a waitress because his feelings for her are more than just that of a boss to an employee. At the end of the series, he tells Akemi that he has just gotten divorced and proposes to her. He is voiced by Norio Wakamoto in the Japanese anime, and by David Kaye in the English version.

=== Sakamoto ===
Sakamoto (坂本) is Yusaku's friend and drinking buddy (usually at Sakamoto's insistence) from school. Sakamoto has his own woman troubles, though in contrast to Yusaku his difficulty is finding the right one. Sakamoto occasionally offers Yusaku a roof to live under when situations temporarily force him out of Maison Ikkoku, and even has a word or two of insight on love for Yusaku, but more often than not the nights the two spend drinking together (often to lament that Sakamoto got dumped again) get Yusaku in trouble with Kyoko for one reason or another. Sakamoto has a small white kitten, that he named Kyoko, that was left in Godai's care for a while, creating some confusion. He is voiced by Toshio Furukawa in the Japanese anime, and by Terry Klassen in the English version. In the One-pound Gospel OVA, when Kosaku Hatanaka is walking around the streets deciding whether to eat or not, Sakamoto shouts out to him saying we got nice girls which is a parody of the work he does at the cabaret.

=== Sayoko Kuroki ===
Sayoko Kuroki (黒木 小夜子, Kuroki Sayoko) is one of Yusaku's college classmates, who recruits him to join the schools puppet theater club. Sayoko becomes more important later in the series when she helps Yusaku get a part-time job at the pre-school she works at, setting him towards his final career goal. (In the anime, it is Kozue who gets Yusaku the pre-school job.) Sayoko eventually marries the former president of the puppet theater club, Saotome, whom she was involved with for a long time, although it is never mentioned until she becomes engaged. She is voiced by Saeko Shimazu in the Japanese anime, by Yoshiko Sakakibara in the movie, and by Nicole Oliver in the English anime.

=== Iioka ===
Iioka (飯岡) is the manager at Bunny Cabaret, and one of Sakamoto's friends. He is introduced when Sakamoto and Godai have a party at the cabaret and don't have enough money to pay off their tab. Iioka lets them work it off, and later offers Godai the "Welfare Director" job taking care of the children of the bunny girls at the cabaret. He looks like a tough guy, and gives Godai a lot of advice regarding his relationships with Kyoko, Kozue, and Yagami. He really is concerned over Godai and has a good opinion about him. He even tells Kyoko to be kinder to Godai, because he tries so hard for her. He is voiced by Kei Tomiyama in the Japanese anime, and by Trevor Devall in the English version.

== Reception ==
Toren Smith suggested that the secret to Maison Ikkoku's success lies in "Takahashi's unparalleled ability to create characters that the readers are sympathetic with." Anime News Network's Allen Divers proclaimed "The beauty of Maison Ikkoku is the fact that the entire cast feels dynamic enough that each could be the center of an episode without pulling away from the main idea of the series." A colleague of his praised Takahashi's character designs, saying she "manages to give life to the people on the page, giving them a sense of realism and making the story more believable." However, they remarked that aside from Kyoko and Yusaku, the other characters serve only "to create conflicts, exposition, and comedic relief." Melissa Sternenberg of THEM Anime Reviews praised the supporting cast for reacting to what happens around them, something she said is unlike many other anime.
