= Dwight D. Guilfoil Jr. =

American businessman (1922–1989)

Dwight D. Guilfoil Jr. (November 19, 1922 – March 4, 1989) was an American businessman and advocate for workers with disabilities.

== Early life and education ==
Guilfoil was born in Chicago, Illinois. His father was an engineer and a veteran of World War I. The younger Dwight graduated from Lane Technical High School in Chicago in 1940. He attended the Art Institute of Chicago and worked as a commercial artist before he enlisted in the Army Air Corps in 1942. He was training to be an aerial reconnaissance photographer in Texas when he contracted both poliomyelitis and spinal meningitis. Guilfoil was discharged from the Army in 1945 after several years in a military hospital in Arkansas.

== Career ==
After the war, Guilfoil and other disabled veterans founded Paraplegics Manufacturing Inc., or PAMCO, an electronics assembly plant in Bensenville, Illinois which employed up to a hundred physically disabled workers at its peak. "We decided from the start that we were not going to weave rugs or make baskets, or indulge in any of the usual workshop enterprises," Guilfoil recalled. Guilfoil was the company's president and public face, frequently giving talks or writing articles advocating for disabled workers. PAMCO's customers were often government agencies, and Guilfoil made a point of mentioning the factory's contributions to the space program. "Our workers so far have contributed parts for most of the space probes and we expect to do more." His essay "Let's Stop 'Handicapping' Americans" was widely syndicated in 1960.

Guilfoil served on the President's Committee on Employment of the Handicapped, and on the Illinois State Commission on Employment of the Handicapped. He was also national president of the Paralyzed Veterans of America in 1959, and of the National Paraplegia Foundation in 1963. For his work, Guilfoil was recognized as one of the "Ten Outstanding Young Men of the United States" by the Junior Chamber of Commerce in 1957, and he won the President's Trophy for "Handicapped American of the Year" in 1960. He chaired a Chicago-area chapter of Easter Seals in 1961.

Guilfoil is also credited to being the first man to provide the idea of Handicapped Parking spaces to President Richard Nixon, who also started a close working relationship thereafter with Guilfoil.

== Personal life ==
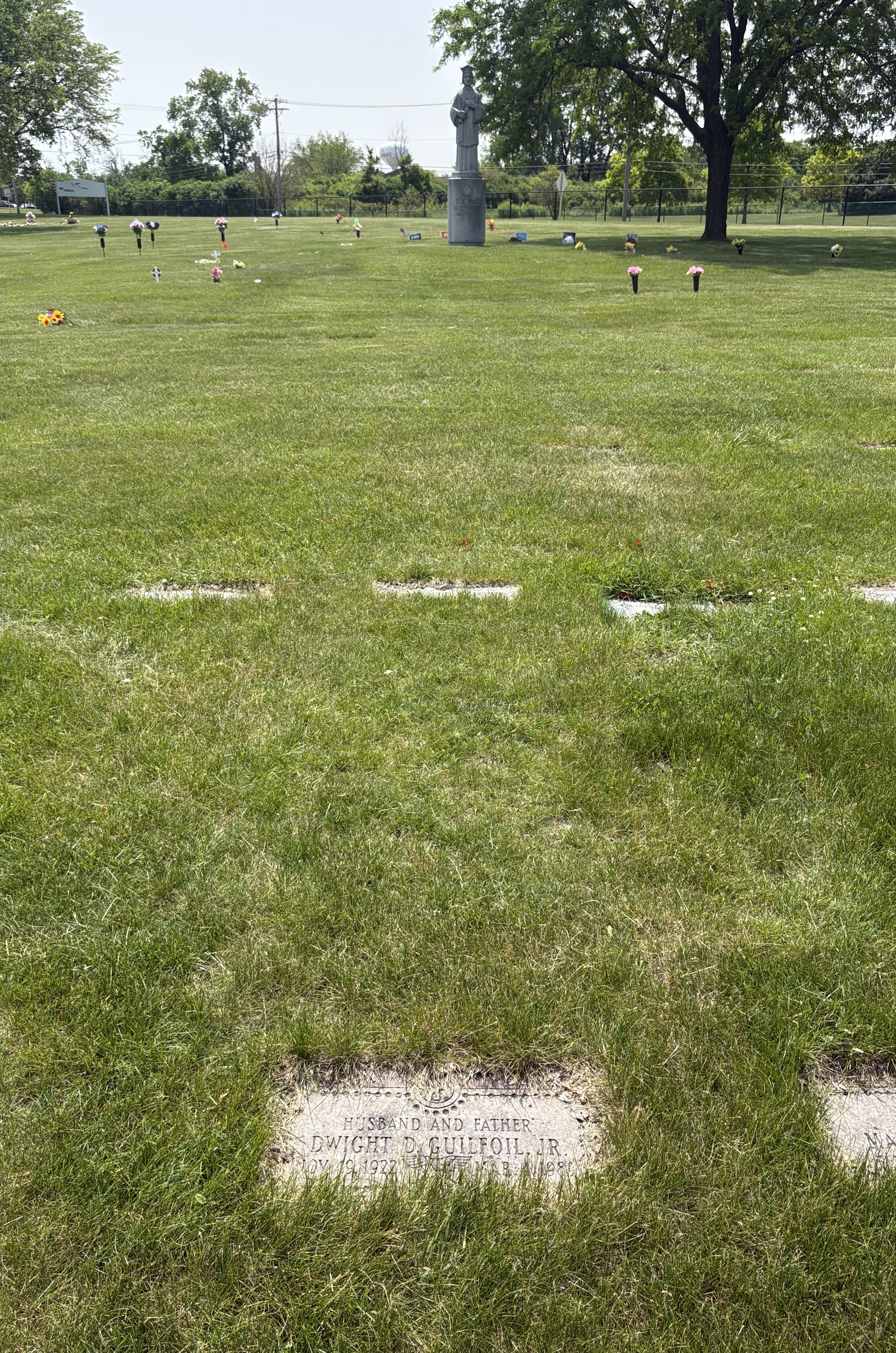
Guilfoil's grave at All Saints Cemetery

Guilfoil was married to Margaret Cullerton in 1940, and was the father of eight children. He was named "Chicago Father of the Year" in 1953, and "Mr. Illinois" that same year. He was active in his local community, as commander of his local American Legion post, and a member of his local Rotary Club.

Guilfoil was widowed in July 1988, and died in March 1989, at a nursing home in Arlington Heights, Illinois. He was 66 years old.

He was buried at All Saints Cemetery in Des Plaines.
