= Kidd Kraddick =

U.S. radio personality and voice actor (1959–2013)

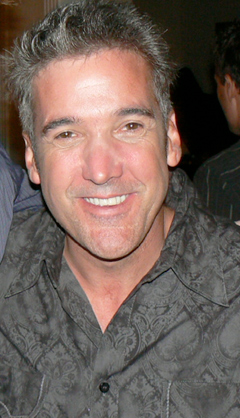
- Cradick in 2011
- Born: David Peter Cradick; August 22, 1959; Napoleon, Ohio, U.S.
- Died: July 27, 2013 (aged 53); Gretna, Louisiana, U.S.
- Presenting career
- Show: Kidd Kraddick in the Morning
- Station: KHKS (home station) or Syndicated: 70+ affiliates
- Time slot: Weekdays, 6-9 a.m. Central
- Country: United States
- Website: kiddnation.com

David Peter Cradick (August 22, 1959 – July 27, 2013) was an American radio host and television personality, known as Kidd Kraddick. His nationally syndicated morning radio show, The Kidd Kraddick Morning Show, is based in Irving, Texas, and aired throughout the United States, syndicated by Kraddick's company, YEA Media Group. He was also seen on the nationally syndicated Dish Nation television show weeknights around the United States.

== Early life ==
Kraddick was born in Napoleon, Ohio and grew up in Dunedin, Florida. His first radio position was in Tampa. He later worked in Fresno, California (KYNO-FM), Miami, Salt Lake City (KAYK & KLRZ), and Los Angeles (KHTZ), where he also worked comedy clubs as an emcee.

== Radio personality ==
Kraddick received the nickname "Kidd" from a radio producer and used the name on-air from 1978 until his death. He won the Billboard Magazine "Air Personality of the Year" Award three times, received the 1992 and 1997 AWRO "Air Personality of the Year," the Marconi Award for "Radio Personality of the Year", won the first annual 1999 WB Radio Music Award as the "Best Radio Personality in the Country", and also the 2001 "Radio and Records CHR/Pop Personality/Show of the Year."

=== Dallas ===
He moved to Dallas in 1984 and took over the night shift on the newly formatted rock-leaned top-40 station KEGL ”The Eagle” and established a following. In 1990, Kraddick was named to the Ten Outstanding Young Americans list by the United States Junior Chamber. KEGL changed formats from Top 40 pop/rock to Modern Rock in 1992 and Kraddick was released from his contract. After eight months off the air, he was hired to a morning position at Top 40 KHKS ”Kiss-FM” in Dallas–Fort Worth where he launched Kidd Kraddick in the Morning. He won a 1998 Marconi Award for Major Market Radio Personality of the Year while he was with KHKS and the next year he won Air Personality of the Year at the Radio Music Awards. He began to syndicate the show in 2001 by signing with Premiere Networks and moved the production to an independent studio in Las Colinas. Kraddick became a member of the Texas Radio Hall of Fame. In 2016, Kraddick was posthumously inducted into the National Radio Hall of Fame. After his death the "Kidd Kraddick Award" was debuted by TalentMaster's Morning Show Boot Camp to recognize the successes, distinctive styles and authentic nature of the recipient, and their impact on their communities.

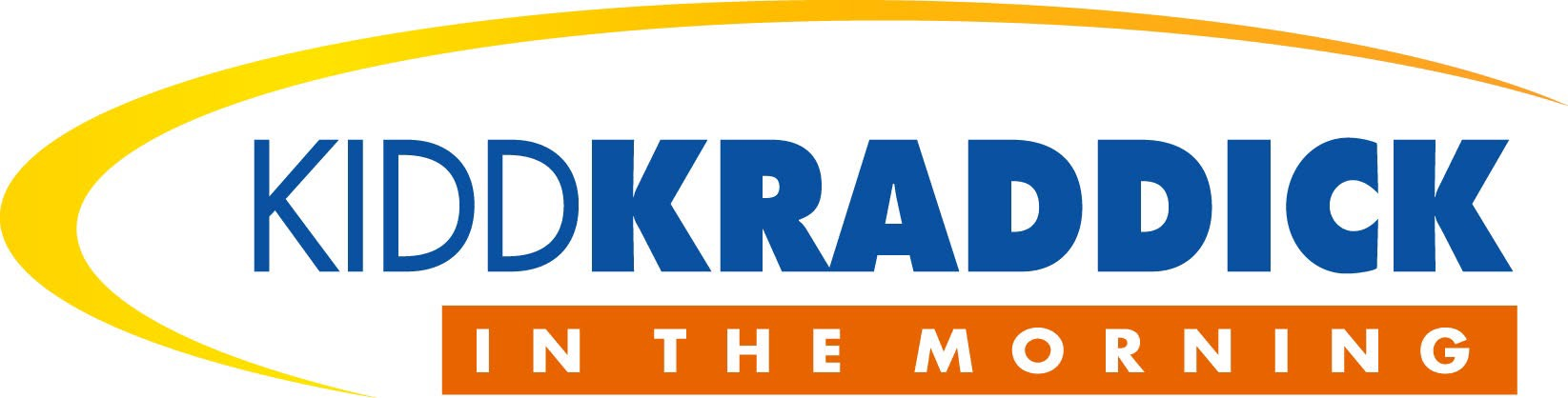
The logo for Kidd Kraddick in the Morning.

=== Kidd Kraddick in the Morning ===
In 1992, Kidd Kraddick in the Morning was born as a local radio program in Dallas. The show broadcasts live from 6–9 a.m. Central on weekday mornings and is nationally syndicated in more than 40 markets, as well as the American Forces Radio Network through YEA Media Group. Kraddick voiced a number of characters, making extensive use of voice altering technology in improvising characters as they came up during show discussions. One of the most popular was Kraddick improvising the voice of co-host, "J-Si" wife/high school sweetheart, Kinsey. He has voiced other characters such as "Must Be Nice Guy", and other characters that added flair to the show. After his death in 2013, the show continued to air as an ensemble, posthumously under the name The Kidd Kraddick Morning Show, featuring the remaining cast members.

== Other ==
In the early 1990s, Kraddick launched two radio oriented businesses. A monthly publication for morning personalities called "The Morning Mouth" and a show prep "sharing service" for air personalities called "BitBoard". Kraddick subsequently sold both entities; BitBoard is now operated by Clear Channel Communications and The Morning Mouth is owned and operated by Talentmasters in Atlanta.

In 1991, he founded a charity organization "Kidd's Kids", with the mission to "provide hope and happiness by creating beautiful memories for families of children with life-altering or life-threatening conditions." What initially began as a bus ride to Sea World in San Antonio expanded into a family trip to Walt Disney World in Orlando for over a thousand children.

== Personal life ==
Kraddick attended the University of Miami for a semester, but dropped out to study broadcasting. Kraddick was Catholic. He and his wife, Carol, were separated in 2007 and divorced in April 2008. They had one daughter, Caroline. He had planned on remarrying in the near future to Lissi Mullen to whom he was engaged with the week before his death.

In 2009, Kraddick was diagnosed with lymphoma, which he kept hidden from his coworkers and family.

== Death ==
Kraddick died on July 27, 2013, while attending an annual fundraiser for his charity, Kidd's Kids, at Timberlane Country Club in Gretna, Louisiana. Jefferson Parish Deputy Coroner Granville Morse said heart disease was "evident" and that drug use and foul play were not suspected, according to his findings after a routine autopsy. Morse said Kraddick had an enlarged heart. He also had three diseased vessels and one of his arteries had an 80 percent blockage. In early August 2013, the Jefferson Parish Coroner's Office concluded Kraddick's cause of death was arteriosclerotic and hypertensive cardiovascular disease.
