= Power Up Gambia =

Non-governmental organization

- Headquarters: Philadelphia, Pennsylvania
- Region served: The Gambia
- Services: Electrification
- Website: powerupgambia.org

Power Up Gambia (PUG) is a Philadelphia-based non-profit health care and environmental group that works in the Gambia, in West Africa. It was founded in 2006 by Kathryn Cunningham Hall, then a University of Pennsylvania undergraduate.

The organization's goal is to provide reliable electricity to health care facilities throughout the Gambia. They do so through the installation of solar panel systems and battery storage systems, providing power throughout the day.

== History ==
Power Up Gambia was founded in 2006 by Kathryn Cunningham Hall, an undergraduate at the University of Pennsylvania. While traveling to Sulayman Junkung General Hospital in the Gambia, she saw the consequences of limited electricity for Gambian patients. She founded Power Up Gambia, which installed a solar system at that hospital. Since then, the group has grown and has completed a solar panel installation at a village clinic, Somita Community Clinic. PUG is looking to expand its organization beyond the Philadelphia area as it prepares for an installation at Bansang Hospital, one of the largest in the Gambia. For her work Kathryn Hall was named as one of the 10 Outstanding Young Americans (2009) by the United States Junior Chamber (Jaycees).

The organization is also working with the Gambian Technical Training Institute in Banjul, the capital, to develop a solar energy training program to support its efforts over the long term.

== Projects ==
- Sulayman Junkung General Hospital: Completed in 2009
- Somita Community Clinic: Completed in 2010
- Bansang Hospital: Currently Underway, Completion Estimated in 2012
