= Dominic M. Calabro =

Dominic M. Calabro is an American public policy executive and the former president and CEO of Florida TaxWatch, a Florida-based research institute and government watchdog. He led the organization from 1982 until his retirement on January 1, 2026, when he was succeeded by Florida’s 17th Lieutenant Governor, Jeff Kottkamp.

Calabro was originally hired by Florida TaxWatch in June 1980 as a research analyst and became a senior research analyst in September 1980. He took over as president and CEO in 1982. Prior to joining Florida TaxWatch, Calabro was a budget analyst with the Florida Senate Ways and Means Subcommittee.

Calabro has a bachelor's degree from Florida International University and has a master's degree from Florida State University, earning high honors for both degrees. He is a recipient of various awards and honors, including being recognized by the United States Junior Chamber as one of the Ten Outstanding Young Americans in 1994 and Executive of the Year in 2006 by the Florida Society of Association Executives. He has been recognized by Florida Trend as a “Must Know Floridian” and a member of the Florida Trend 500 Most Influential Business Leaders each year of its publication (2018-2021).
