= Charles T. Murr =

Priest, author, linguist

Father Charles Theodore Murr-Létourneau

Personal life
- Born: Charles Theodore Murr; August 15, 1950 (age 76) Saint Paul, Minnesota
- Website: https://www.charlesmurr.com/

Religious life
- Religion: Roman Catholic
- Ordination: 13 May 1977 by Cardinal Pericle Felici

Senior posting
- Previous post: Pastor, St. Francis de Sales Roman Catholic Church, Manhattan, New York, New York and Pastor, St. Lucy Roman Catholic Church, Manhattan, New York, New York

Charles T. Murr (born August 15, 1950) (also Charles Theodore Murr-Létourneau) is a Catholic priest, author, linguist, educator, raconteur and founder of Villa Francisco Javier Nuno Orphanage in Tepatitlan, Jalisco, Mexico. Murr is notable as a recipient of the "Ten Outstanding Young Persons of the World" award and the "Ten Outstanding Young Americans". Both honors were awarded in 1985.

== Early life ==
Charles Theodore Murr was born in Saint Paul, Minnesota on August 15, 1950 (the Feast of the Assumption of the Blessed Virgin Mary), the oldest of seven children born to Theodore Charles and Anita Jane (née Spargur-Letourneau) Murr.

== Education ==
Murr completed his primary and secondary education at Saint Augustine Grammar and Providence Grade School, both in South Saint Paul. He attended Brady High School, run by the Christian Brothers (De La Salle Brothers) in West Saint Paul, graduating in 1969.

Murr then went on to St. Norbert College in De Pere, Wisconsin, obtaining his B.A., (Magna cum laude) in Romance Languages in 1971, while also taking graduate courses at the University of Wisconsin-Madison during the summers of 1970 and 1971 in French, Spanish and Latin, and courses in Literature at the University of Wisconsin-Green Bay.

In the fall of 1971, he enrolled in the Pontificia Studiorum Universitas a Santo Thoma Aquinate in Urbe, Rome, Italy; earning a second baccalaureate, this time in philosophy in 1972. He then began theological studies at the same university, earning another baccalaureate, this time in Thomistic theology, finishing in 1975. Moving on to graduate theology, Murr attended the Pontificia Universitas Gregoriana, Rome, Italy, earning a licentiate in sacred theology in 1977, and continuing there, earning a licentiate in philosophical anthropology in 1979.

His continuing education includes: Universität Salzburg; Salzburg, Austria, 1993–1994, Psychology and German; Saint Joseph's Seminary, Dunwoodie, New York, M.Div. 1996, and New York University, New York, New York, M.S. in psychology, 2001.

== Career ==
On May 13, 1977, in the Basilica of SS. Giovanni e Paulo (Monte Celio), Murr was ordained a Roman Catholic priest by Pericle Cardinal Felici. Murr had worked in the Ufficio Informazioni (Piazza San Pietro, Vaticano) from 1974 to 1979. He had additional duties as a special aide to Édouard Cardinal Gagnon who conducted an apostolic visitation (1976 to 1979) to the Roman Curia.

In September 1979, Murr was called to Mexico for one year of pastoral experience before returning to Europe to finish his doctoral dissertation in philosophy. Assigned as curate to the Church of La Sagrada Familia, a parish in Tepatitlan, Jalisco (near Guadalajara), he was also named professor of philosophy and theology at the Seminario Major de San Juan de los Lagos, Jalisco. Shortly after his arrival in Tapatitlan, Murr began "collecting" abandoned street kids and brought them to his home and began to feed, clothe, and educate them.

Within the year, he had taken in 12 boys and 8 girls. Murr greatly enjoyed teaching but the number of his children was growing and traveling back and forth to the seminary – an hour and a half each way over unimproved roads – was beginning to take its toll. He appealed to his Ordinary, Archbishop Francisco Javier Nuno, who was impressed with Murr's zeal and concern for the children and so assigned him full-time to found and build a diocesan orphanage, relieving him of his duties at the seminary. Murr returned to Rome and enlisted the assistance of the Italian Congregation of Our Lady of Sorrows. Hailing from Forli, Abruzzi, the Republic of San Marino, and Rome, four nuns were sent to help him run his mission. Murr faced accusations of sexual abuse of children while working in Mexico.

During one of Murr's trips to Rome, he was sent to Beirut (Fall, 1983) to assist in the release of kidnap victim Youssef el-Khoury, the Archbishop of Tyre, a mission that was successful in obtaining the archbishop's release.

Murr worked two summers (1984 and 1985) on Wall Street (Fundamental Brokers, Inc.) to earn money for his orphanage. Eventually, that company, and its CEO, Vincent William Griffo, became major donors to Murr's orphanage and mission.

About five years from its founding, Villa Francisco Javier Nuno was dedicated on the Feast of Our Lady of Sorrows (Mexican Independence Day), September 15, 1986, and became home to 148 Mexican children. Because of his activities at the orphanage, later that year Murr became a recipient of the JCI's "Ten Outstanding Young Americans" for 1986 and "Ten Outstanding Young Persons of the World" World award for 1986; he was nominated for the honors by Theodore M. Hesburgh of the University of Notre Dame, who was himself a past recipient. Murr oversaw the construction of other facilities supporting the Orphanage (Casa Hogar) Villa Francisco Javier: La Boulangerie Saint Joseph; Restaurant de L’Eau Vive, also located in Tepatitlan de Morelos, Jalisco, and Rancho Arcangel Miguel [RAM], Buena Vista (Municipio de Tepatitlan de Morelos), Jalisco, Mexico. The building of Rancho Arcangel Miguel was designed by Murr, whose father was a builder and passed along architectural skills to him; RAM was crafted to be a replica of the Von Trapp Family home near Salzburg, Austria.

In order to support his work in Tepatitlan, Murr founded Father Charles Murr Orphanages, Inc., an organization of which he remains President.

Murr's first novel "The Society Of Judas" is a Roman à clef based on his experiences in Rome, Beirut, New York and Guadalajara, and has been translated into three languages.

Murr was still in charge of the orphanage when, on May 24, 1993, the Archbishop of Guadalajara, Juan Jesús Cardinal Posadas Ocampo was brutally assassinated by drug lords of the Guadalajara Cartel. That same day he was advised to resign from his Mexican diocese. In 1995, John Cardinal O'Connor John Joseph Cardinal O'Connor incardinated Murr into the Archdiocese of New York.

In New York, Murr assisted in the design and restoration of Saint Joseph Roman Catholic Church (German National Parish), Yorkville (Manhattan), New York, New York; the remodeling of Our Lady of Guadalupe Roman Catholic Church, Chelsea/Greenwich Village (Manhattan), New York, New York; the restoration and renovation of Saint Francis de Sales Roman Catholic Church (Manhattan), New York, New York, having been assigned as pastor of Saint Francis, located at 96th Street between Park and Lexington Avenues, Manhattan. At the same time, he was also assigned as pastor of nearby Saint Lucy Roman Catholic Church.

On April 2, 2004, Murr resigned his post as Pastor of Saint Francis de Sales Roman Catholic Church. because of financial and administrative problems with the parish's elementary school, St. Francis Academy, which closed in 2007.

In 2012, he became Founder and President of The YEPES Y ALVAREZ Legal Defense Fund, Inc., a non-profit organization which assists in select legal defense cases. In 2013, he founded The VERITAS Foundation for Justice, Inc., a non-profit corporation which has as one of its major scopes to investigate, collect data, and assist victims of grave social injustice.

== Nonfiction ==
- AMICITIAE (Rome: L'Universita Gregoriana, 1976), 62 pages.
- DYADIC INTERPERSONALISM (New York: New York University, 2000), 74 pages.
- PERHAPS LOVE (San Francisco, 2019), 103 pages.

== Narrative Nonfiction ==
- MEMOIRS OF AN UNWED FATHER (New York, New York: 1995), 294 pages.
- THREE SOMEWHAT LONG SHORT STORES: RAFAEL CARO QUINTERO and The Sexologist of Cuautla; TRIPLE-CROSS and The Madoninna of Forli; SIX LESSONS from Madame Tarasca (Salzburg: 2005), 204 pages.
- THE SOCIETY OF JUDAS (Salzburg: 2006), 387 pages.
- ED ERA NOTTE (San Francisco: 2019), 305 pages.
- THE GODMOTHER: MADRE PASCALINA: A Feminine Tour de Force (San Francisco: 2017), 282 pages.
- THE SYRIAN: HILARION CAPUCCI and The Priceless Ransom (San Francisco: 2018), 158 pages.
- LA MADRINA (San Francisco: 2019), 310 pages.
- MURDER IN THE 33RD DEGREE: The Gagnon Investigation into Vatican Freemasonry (San Francisco: 2022), 212 Pages (now translated into nine languages).
- AND IT WAS NIGHT (Sevilla: 2025), 684 pages.
- Y ERA DE NOCHE (Sevilla: 2025), 717 pages.

== Fiction ==
- AN OPTICAL CONCLUSION: RAFAEL CARO QUINTERO and THE MACABRE DEATH of DOCTOR JORGE MEJIA (Sevilla: Anticipated release date: March, 2026).

== Architecture ==
- VILLA FRANCISCO JAVIER NUNO (Tepatitlan de Morelos, Jalisco, Mexico), 1986.
- L'EAU VIVE (Tepatitlan de Morelos, Jalisco, Mexico), 1989.
- RANCHO ARCANGEL MIGUEL [RAM] (Buena Vista, Jalisco, Mexico), 1991.

== Design and Restoration ==
- Church of Saint Joseph Yorkville [Assistant] (New York, New York), 1998.
- Original Del Monaco Family Home (New York, New York), 2000.
- Parish House and Church of Saint Francis De Sales (New York, New York), 2003.

== Musical composition ==
MISSA ROMANUS ROMAE [Mass In Honour Of Pius XII], for Four Voices & Organ; Coro della Cappella Sistina under the direction of Msgr. Domenico Bartolucci; May 13, 1977, Basilica dei Santi Giovanni e Paulo, Monte Celio, Roma, Italia.
