= Ralph W. Hingson =

American epidemiologist (born 1948)

Ralph W. Hingson (born July 21, 1948) is an American epidemiologist who since 2004 is the Director of the Division of Epidemiology and Prevention Research at the National Institute on Alcohol and Alcohol Abuse. He was a professor at the Boston University School of Public Health since 1973 and was chais of the Social and Behavioral Sciences Department chair from 1986 to 2001 when he became the school's Associate Dean for Research from 2001 to 2004. He is considered an expert on drunk driving legislation.

Hingson earned his Sc.D. from the Johns Hopkins Bloomberg School of Public Health in 1974, a Bachelor in International Relations, also from Johns Hopkins University (1969) and a Master in Public Health from the University of Pittsburgh in 1970.

== Publications ==
- Hingson, Ralph W; Zha, Wenxing; Weitzman, Elissa R (2015-01-09). "Magnitude of and Trends in Alcohol-Related Mortality and Morbidity Among U.S. College Students Ages 18-24, 1998-2005". Journal of Studies on Alcohol and Drugs, Supplement (s16): 12–20.
- Stein, Michael D.; Freedberg, Kenneth A.; Sullivan, Lisa M.; Savetsky, Jacqueline; Levenson, Suzette M.; Hingson, Ralph; Samet, Jeffrey H. (1998-02-09). "Sexual Ethics". Archives of Internal Medicine. 158 (3): 253–7.
- Brown, S. A., McGue, M., Maggs, J., Schulenberg, J., Hingson, R., Swartzwelder, S., Martin, C., Chung, T., Tapert, S. F., Sher, K., Winters, K. C., Lowman, C., & Murphy, S. (2009). Underage alcohol use: Summary of developmental processes and mechanisms: Ages 16-20. Alcohol Research & Health, 32(1), 41–52.
- White, A., & Hingson, R. (2013). The burden of alcohol use: Excessive alcohol consumption and related consequences among college students. Alcohol Research: Current Reviews, 35(2), 201–218.
