= Kent Waldrep =

American football player (1954–2022)

Kent Waldrep (March 2, 1954 - February 27, 2022) was an American football player and disability rights activist. He was a running back for Texas Christian University and an honorary member of The University of Alabama's "A" Club, an organization for those who letter in varsity sports at the university.

== Football career, disability, and activism ==
On October 26, 1974, during a game against The University of Alabama, Waldrep, a running back, attempted to execute a sweep right play. He was tackled by three defenders, but stayed on his feet until a forth defender tackled him at his legs. Waldrep flipped backwards, landing on his head, crushing a vertebra, and permanently bruising his spinal cord, an injury that left him paralyzed from the neck down.

Waldrep was immediately transported to The University of Alabama Hospital, in Birmingham. After the game, for the first and only time in his coaching career, Paul W. "Bear" Bryant did not return home with his team. Instead, he went straight to the hospital to check on Waldrep, a trip he repeated daily for some time afterward. In fact, when Waldrep awoke from his coma, Bryant was the first person he saw. To lift Waldrep's spirit, Bryant brought along friends too, such as Charlie Finney, owner of the World Champion Oakland A's, and George Steinbrenner, owner of the New York Yankees. Bryant also used the Alabama network of boosters and his wealthy contacts to cover Waldrep's medical expenses. Bryant later ensured that if Waldrep ever had children, they would be able to attend The University of Alabama at no cost. Both of Waldrep's children, Trey and Charley, did so. When Bryant died in 1983, Kent sat with the coach's family at the funeral.

In the following years, Waldrep become an advocate for spinal cord research and pushed for the enactment of the Americans With Disabilities Act. In 1982, President Ronald Reagan appointed Waldrep to the National Council on the Handicapped (now called the National Council on Disability), where he became vice chairman. In a 1985 memo, Waldrep himself named what was eventually the Americans with Disabilities Act of 1990. Waldrep founded the National Paralysis Foundation in 1985, and in 1994, he and the University of Texas Southwestern Medical Center in Dallas created the Kent Waldrep Foundation Center for Basic Research on Nerve Growth and Regeneration." He was also the grant committee chairman of the College Football Assistance Fund, which provides financial aid to football players who suffer serious injuries.

In 1997, Waldrep sued TCU, claiming that he had been an employee of the school at the time of the injury and was therefore entitled to workers' compensation funds. Though the courts initially sided with Waldrep, a Texas appellate court reversed the decision in 2000, finding that he could not have been considered an employee at the time of the injury.

In addition to leading his research foundations, Waldrep was the founder and president of Waldrep Medical and Disability Solutions, Inc., an Addison, Texas-based disability accommodation consulting firm.

Waldrep's health began to deteriorate in 2005. A 2012 stroke left him unable to work or drive a vehicle. Gary Patterson (then head coach of the TCU football team), along with Moritz Dealerships, helped secure funds for a new vehicle.

Kent Waldrep died on Sunday, February 27, 2022, in Nachitoches, Louisiana, after a struggle with pneumonia. He was 67 years old.
