= Pedorthist =

Footcare specialist

A pedorthist is a professional who has specialized training to modify footwear and employ supportive devices to address conditions which affect the feet and lower limbs. They are trained in the assessment of lower limb anatomy and biomechanics, and the appropriate use of corrective footwear – including shoes, shoe modifications and other pedorthic devices.

== Certified Pedorthist ==
“Certified Pedorthist” is a title used by the American Board for Certification in Orthotics, Prosthetics and Pedorthics (ABC) International Certification, Board of Certification/Accreditation, PFA FOOTCARE ASSOCIATION (Canadian Chapter). PFA Footcare Association Canada members are internationally recognized, The College of Pedorthics of Canada which borrowed the term Certified Pedorthist and therefore needed to add the (C) to avoid trademark infringement of the term developed by ABC. Certified Pedorthist is also used by the Pedorthic Association Australia, where the only English speaking university degree of Pedorthics is taught at Southern Cross University.

There are 3 types of Certified Pedorthist credentials in Canada. C.Ped. BOCPD and C.Ped.(C). Only members of PFA FOOTCARE ASSOCIATION (Canadian Chapter) with the designations C.Ped. and BOCPD, also have a Canadian Pedorthist Licence CPL, and are internationally recognized having written a US and Canadian exam. The professional designation of Certified Pedorthist is assigned to individuals who have completed the required training through education and clinic experience, and have passed the Pedorthic Certification exam. An individual who has met the above requirements must comply with mandatory continuing education program in order to maintain this certification. Individuals with a Certified Pedorthist designation are qualified to practice in United States, Canada and internationally. A certified pedorthist is obligated to support and conform to professional responsibilities that promote and assure the overall welfare of the patient and the integrity of the profession. Pedorthists consult with patients based on a referral from a prescribing healthcare professional such as a family physician, and are integrated members of health care teams. Certified Pedorthists work within a specific capacity detailed in their respective scope of practice documents. American Board for Certification in Orthotics, Prosthetics and Pedorthics (ABC) - Scope of Practice, Board of Certification/Accreditation (BOC)- Scope of Practice, and the College of Pedorthics (CPC)- Scope of Practice.

The American Board for Certification, the Board of Certification/Accreditation and the College of Pedorthics of Canada enforce their professional code of ethics for all members regardless of the country they choose to practice in. The Pedorthic Footcare Association or PFA (United States, International and Canadian Chapter) is a self-regulatory body which verifies, upholds, monitors and supports the competent and ethical practice of its Certified Pedorthist members.

- Alleviating painful or debilitating conditions of the lower limb;
- Accommodation of foot deformities;
- Re-alignment of anatomical structures;
- Redistribution of external and internal forces;
- Improvement of balance;
- Control of biomechanical function;
- Accommodation of circulatory special requirements; and,
- Enhancement of the actions or limbs compromised as a result of accident, congenital deformity, neural condition, or disease.

A Certified Pedorthist – C.Ped., BOCPD or C.Ped (C) is a health professional who is trained to assess patients, formulate and implement a treatment plan and follow-up with patients. The services provided include, but are not limited to:

Assessment

- The evaluation and documentation of: Biomechanics;
- In-shoe pressure mapping
- Gait analysis including temporal and spatial assessment;
- Range of motion;
- Footwear analysis;
- Review of potentially complicated health factors;
- Circulation;
- Skin integrity;
- Pedorthic requirements;
- Poprioception and environmental barriers including social, home and work integration.

Formulation of a treatment

- Verification of prescription/documentation;
- Evaluation of the prescription rationale;
- A needs assessment based on patient and/or caregiver input;
- Development of functional goals;
- Analysis of structural and design requirements;
- Consultation with and/or referral to other health care professionals as required.

Implementation of the treatment plan

- Acquisition of / modification and/or rectification of anthropometric data;
- Casting and measuring for custom footwear;
- Material selection and fabrication;
- Fitting and modifying standard and orthopaedic footwear;
- Accommodating/incorporating complementary assistive devices;
- Fabrication of pedorthic devices;
- Device structural evaluation;
- Patient education and instruction.

Follow-up treatment plan

- Documentation of functional changes;
- Formulation of modifications to ensure successful outcomes;
- Reassessment of patient expectations;
- Reassessment of treatment objectives;
- Development of long term treatment plan;
- Confirmation of patient education and instruction.

== See also ==
- Orthotist
- Health care providers
- Podiatrist
- Prosthetist
- Foot health practitioner in the United Kingdom
