= Thomas R. Reid =

American politician

Member of the Wyoming House of Representatives
- In office 1905–1907

Personal details
- Born: Thomas Robert Reid; April 12, 1839 London, United Kingdom
- Died: June 17, 1917 (aged 78) Cheyenne, Wyoming, U.S.
- Party: Democratic
- Spouse: Elizabeth Catherine Rodgers
- Children: 2

Military service
- Allegiance: United States
- Branch/service: United States Army
- Years of service: 1867-1872
- Rank: Sergeant
- Unit: 2nd Cavalry Regiment

Thomas Robert Reid (April 12, 1839 – June 17, 1917) was an American politician who served in Wyoming House of Representatives as a Democrat.

== Life ==
Thomas Robert Reid was born in London on April 12, 1839 and in 1844 was taken to Australia by his relatives. In 1860 he immigrated to the United States and went to Omaha, Nebraska Territory. On July 13, 1867 he joined the army and became a sergeant in Troop M of the Second Regiment of Cavalry and served until July 13, 1872.

In 1873 he moved to Cheyenne, Wyoming Territory where he worked for the Union Pacific Railroad until 1909. In 1886 he was elected to Cheyenne's city council and served in the state house from 1905 to 1907.

On June 17, 1917 Reid died at St. John's hospital in Cheyenne.
