= Thomas Baffes =

American surgeon and lawyer

Thomas G. Baffes
- Born: April 3, 1923; New Orleans, Louisiana, USA
- Died: 15 June 1997 (aged 74); Cook County, Illinois, USA
- Education: Tulane University Medical School(M.D.)
- Known for: Repair of transposition of the great vessels
- Medical career
- Field: Vascular surgery, Medicine
- Institutions: Mt. Sinai Hospital

Thomas G. Baffes (April 3, 1923 – June 15, 1997) was an American surgeon and attorney noted for developing a surgical procedure to repair a heart defect known as transposition of the great vessels, which often caused "blue baby" deaths.

== Early life and education ==
Baffes was born in New Orleans, Louisiana, to Greek immigrant parents, Gustave "Gus" Baffes (1893-) (English attribution for the Greek name Konstantinos) and Tina (née Bores) (1905-). They came from Tripoli, Greece. Thomas had one younger sister, Bessie and one younger brother, Christian. He received his M.D. from Tulane University Medical School.

== Career ==
Baffes was chairman of the surgery department at Mt. Sinai Hospital Medical Center in Chicago. He was also a partner in a Chicago law firm, Pierce Daley Baffes and O'Sullivan, and taught classes at DePaul University Law School.
