= Chris Ulmer =

American disability rights activist

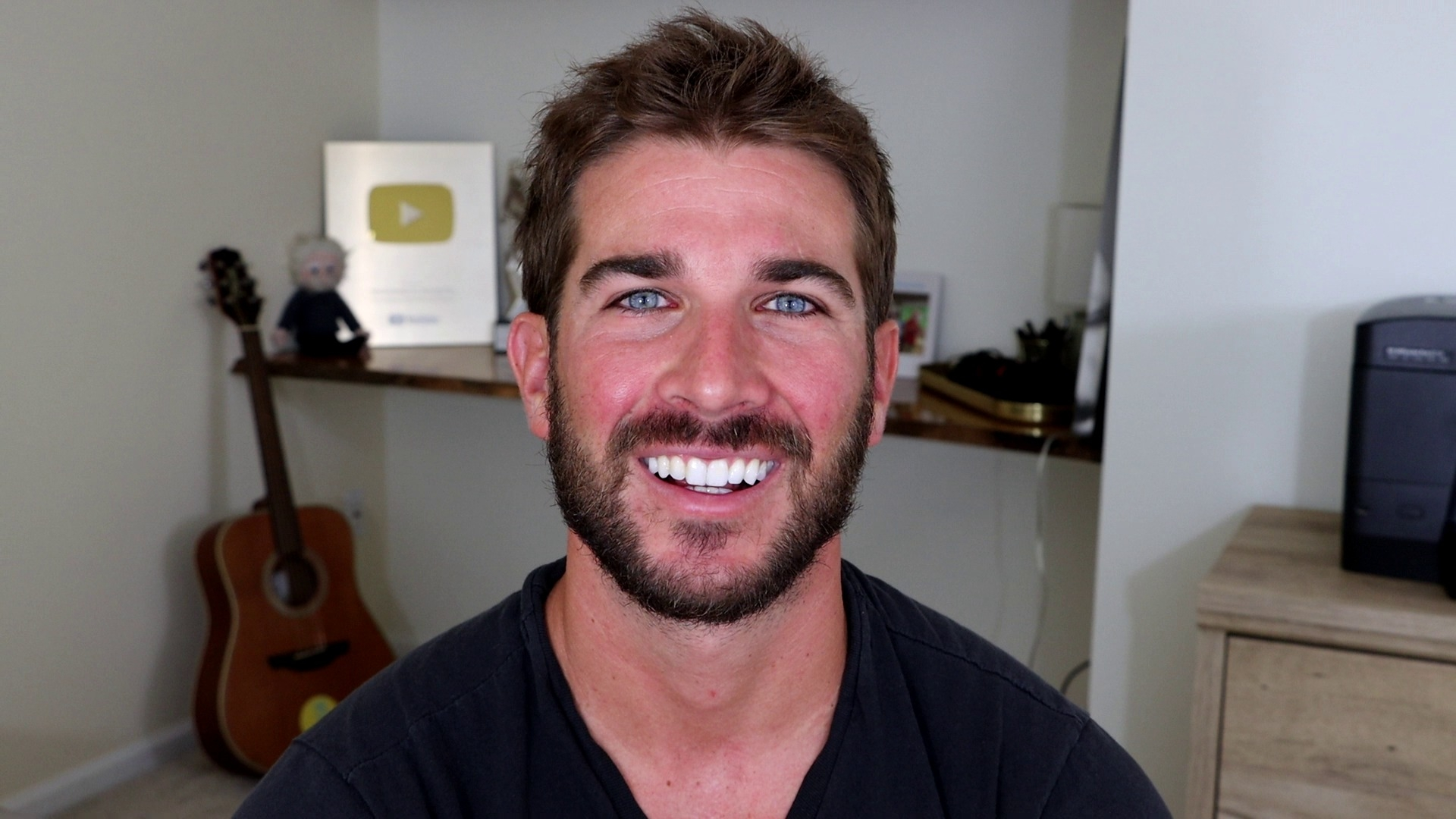
- Ulmer in 2022
- Born: Christopher Ulmer; 4 March 1989 (age 37); Philadelphia, Pennsylvania, U.S.
- Occupations: YouTuber; disability-rights advocate
- Partner: Alyssa Porter

YouTube information
- Channel: Special Books by Special Kids
- Years active: March 19, 2015; 11 years ago
- Genre: Education
- Subscribers: 3.7 million
- Views: 966 million
- Last updated: 27 March 2026
- Website: https://sbsk.org/

Christopher Ulmer is an American disability-rights advocate, former special education teacher, YouTuber, and founder of the non-profit Special Books by Special Kids.

== Early life and education ==
Christopher Ulmer was born on March 4, 1989, a native of Northeast Philadelphia, grew up in the Rhawnhurst neighborhood before moving to Willow Grove, where most of his family still resides. On weekends, he often visited his grandmother, Cecilia "Cissy" Paul, a pediatric nurse who fostered over 130 children, giving Ulmer early exposure to diverse childhood experiences. Ulmer played soccer throughout his youth and later became a walk-on team captain at Penn State Abington, where he earned a degree in media studies in 2010. After graduating from college, Ulmer moved to Kentucky to coach college soccer at the University of the Cumberlands, where he received a master's degree in special education.

== Career ==
After completing his degree, he moved to Jacksonville, Florida, where he became a special education teacher, working with students aged 7 to 10. In 2015, he was teaching a class of eight students with conditions including autism, agenesis of the corpus callosum and traumatic brain injury. He began each school day with a period of compliments directed at his students.

With parental permission, Ulmer began filming interviews with his students and posting them on social media. The project was initially created to introduce his special education students to the community. Ulmer launched the Facebook page Special Books by Special Kids (SBSK) around 2015, and it had over 1.2 million followers as of 2017. He later expanded the project to YouTube under the same name. As of June 2023, SBSK had published approximately 500 videos, with nearly 3 billion total views across social platforms, about 3.9 million Facebook followers and 3.4 million YouTube subscribers. By March 2026, the YouTube channel had around 3.7 million subscribers and over 966 million views.

He travelled back and forth through the country interviewing disabled children to give them, as ABC News put it, "an opportunity to be seen and accepted." As a result, Ulmer has created more than 500 videos of those interviews. A partial transcript, as an example of an interview of a child by Ulmer, is included in the book Flying Starts for Unique Children by author and special-needs teacher Adele Devine.

In March 2019, the YouTube channel of SBSK had its comment sections disabled as part of a wider platform policy affecting videos featuring minors. According to YouTube, the measure was introduced to reduce the risk of predatory behavior in comment sections. According to The Washington Post, channels featuring children with disabilities were bystanders in this near-blanket ban, and the enforcement of the policy was not applied consistently across all channels. Ulmer said removing comments restricted interaction with video subjects, a core part of SBSK’s mission, and eliminated a key source of community support; he also called the decision discriminatory and harmful to the organization’s engagement with the disability community.

== Personal life ==
Ulmer has been in a relationship with Alyssa Porter.

== Awards and nominations ==
Organizations	Year	Category	Result	Ref.
National Organization for Rare Disorders	2018	Rare Impact Award	Won	
Streamy Awards	2018	Nonprofit or NGO Award	Won	
