= Robert S. Schwartz =

American foot wear specialist

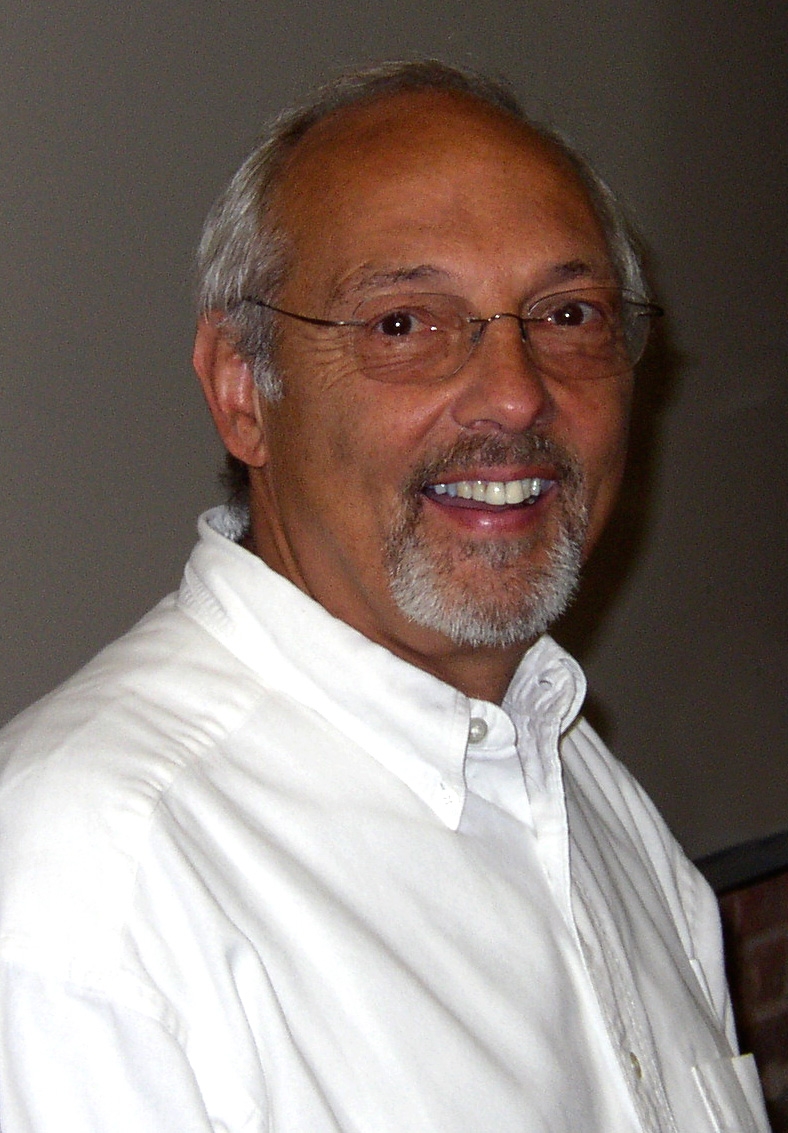
- Robert Schwartz in 2010
- Born: January 18, 1949; 77 years ago Forest Hills, New York, United States
- Education: Syracuse University
- Occupation: Businessman
- Known for: President and CEO of Eneslow Pedorthic Enterprises, and the Eneslow Pedorthic Institute. President of the Pedorthic Footwear Association, PFA
- Spouse: Marla Bornstein
- Children: 2
- Website: www.eneslow.com

Robert (Bob) S. Schwartz, C.Ped., is an American businessman who is the CEO of Eneslow Pedorthic Enterprises, Inc. which operates Eneslow Shoes and Orthotics. He also leads the training organization Eneslow Pedorthic Institute (EPI). Schwartz is recognized as leaders in footwear, footcare, and in his New York community.

== Early life and education ==
Schwart was born in January, 18, 1949 in Forest Hills, New York. He graduated from Forest Hills High School in 1962. Schwartz earned a Bachelor of Science degree in Accounting from Syracuse University in 1962. He served in the US Coast Guard Reserve from 1962 to 1970 and received an honorable discharge.

== Career ==
Schwartz began his career in retail and sales, working at Miles Shoes in Forest Hills, NY, and Waldbaum's Super Market. He also worked as a camp counselor at Camp Roosevelt in Monticello, NY. From 1959 to 1962, he worked at Baker's Shoes in Syracuse, NY, and at Grossinger's Hotel and Resort in Liberty, NY.

In 1963, Schwartz joined International Playtex Corp, where he worked in sales and marketing management until 1973. He then became the owner and marketing director of Apex Foot Health Industries, a company specializing in foot health products.

In 1973, Schwartz joined Eneslow Pedorthic Enterprises, Inc. He became the sole owner of the retail division in 1983 and expanded the company into a regional chain with eight stores. However, due to changes in Medicaid reimbursements, Schwartz consolidated the business to focus on the flagship store located at 924 Broadway in New York City.

In 1995, Schwartz co-founded the Eneslow Pedorthic Institute (EPI) with Dr. Justin Wernick, DPM. EPI offers education and training in pedorthics and foot health.

== Professional activities ==
Schwartz became a Certified Pedorthist (C.Ped.) in 1974 and has been active in the Pedorthic Footcare Association (PFA) since 1985. He served as president from 1986 to 1988 and has been a member of various committees. He became the Executive Director of PFA in 2022.

He has been an adjunct instructor in the Department of Orthopedic Sciences at the New York College of Podiatric Medicine and has taught at several other institutions, including Ball State University, Florida International University, and UCLA.

Schwartz has served on the board of the Manhattan Chamber of Commerce from 2009 to 2021 and has been involved in various civic initiatives, including advocating for changes in commercial rent tax legislation and assisting businesses affected by the Second Avenue Subway construction.

== Charitable Work ==
Eneslow has provided free footwear to individuals in need through organizations such as Chabad, Soles4Souls, and the International Rescue Committee. Schwartz has also been involved in community projects, including the 23rd Street Association and the Flatiron Business Improvement District.

== Recognition ==
- Seymour Lefton Award (1987) – Pedorthic Footcare Association
- Al Singer Award (2008) – National Shoe Retailers Association
- Retailer of the Year (2009) – Manhattan Chamber of Commerce
- Corporate Hero (2010) – New York Chapter of the Arthritis Foundation
- Age Smart Employer Award (2015) – Robert N. Butler Columbia Aging Center and NY Academy of Medicine
- Footwear Insight Magazine Gold Medal Service Award (2019, 2021)
- OTTY Honoree 2020 – Our Town NY

== Personal life ==
Schwartz is married to Marla Bornstein and they have two children together, Rachel and Michael who both work in the business.
