= Ten Outstanding Young Americans =

Annual award by JCI USA

The Ten Outstanding Young Americans (TOYA) program is an annual award given by JCI USA (formally known as the United States Junior Chamber or the Jaycees). It is given to ten Americans between 18 and 40 years old who "exemplify the best attributes of the nation’s young people."

People considered for the award are often submitted by JCI state organizations. For example, JCI Minnesota ( Minnesota Junior Chamber) has a "Ten Outstanding Young Minnesotans" (TOYM) program. Similarly, the Michigan Junior Chamber has a similar "Outstanding Young Michiganders / Distinguished Service Award (OYM/DSA)" program. These recipients, as well as the nominees from the other JCI USA state organizations, are nominated to be considered for the TOYA award. Membership in the organization is not a requirement to win the award.

The ten selected individuals may be submitted to JCI as nominees for the Outstanding Young Persons of the World (TOYP) program.

== History ==
The concept for America's Ten Outstanding Young Men was fathered by Durward Howes, publisher of a yearly volume, "America's Young Men." Howes published in his books for 1934, 1935, and 1936 his own selections for the twelve outstanding young men in America. In the 1937 volume, he cut the list from twelve men to ten. It has remained that number to the present day. In 1938, Howes gave Future Magazine, the former publication of the United States Jaycees, the exclusive right to publish his selection. As the organization's president in 1939-41, Howes felt that publishing this list would call attention to the important role of young men in the world of the day. Through 1941, editors of Future Magazine selected the ten men with the assistance of Durward Howes and other judges. Since 1942, a panel of distinguished judges has made the selection process. With the advent of women members into the organization, the U.S. Junior Chamber changed the program's name from Ten Outstanding Young Men of America to Ten Outstanding Young Americans in 1985. During the 1986 honors presentation, the first three women were honored at an historic ceremony celebrating the accomplishments of extraordinary young people of both genders.

== Categories ==
Each year, the initial list of all nominees is narrowed to twenty-five finalists by a panel of screening judges, and a second set of judges determines the final list of ten honorees. The nominees are evaluated by a list of criteria and must have made notable achievements in at least three areas.

- Business, economic, and/or entrepreneurial accomplishment
- Political, legal, and/or government affairs
- Academic leadership and/or accomplishment
- Cultural achievement
- Moral and/or environmental leadership
- Contribution to children, world peace, and/or human rights
- Humanitarian and/or voluntary leadership
- Scientific and/or technological development
- Personal improvement and/or accomplishment
- Medical innovation

== Rewards ==
1954 recipient Arthur M. Kraft designed the "Silver Hands" trophy each honoree receives. The inscription on its base reads, "The hope of mankind lies in the hands of youth and action. Each honoree has shown a commitment to that hope, reminding all Americans that no problem is too difficult when handled with grace, ingenuity, courage, and determination." The trophy is named "JAYSON", an acronym standing for "Jaycees: Active Youth Serving Our Nation." Each one weighs 11.5 lbs and is constructed of a marble base with nickel-plated hands. In addition to the artistically designed trophy, each honoree is presented with a framed certificate to display prominently in their home or work space. They are also presented with a lapel pin that was specially designed and crafted by Esco out of Milwaukee, Wisconsin. The pin features the TOYA emblem surrounded by ten black onyx stones and is similar to the traditional Jaycee national officer pins. Both the certificate and pin are presented to each of the honorees during a private luncheon the day of the public presentation.

== See also ==
- List of Ten Outstanding Young Americans
