= Dallas Cowboys Radio Network =

Official radio network of the NFL's Dallas Cowboys

The Dallas Cowboys Radio Network is an American radio network broadcasting all Dallas Cowboys football games to stations across all of Texas, Arkansas, Oklahoma, Louisiana, and New Mexico during the NFL season. Since the 2009 NFL season, it has been an arm of Audacy, Inc. (formerly CBS Radio until 2017 and later Entercom until 2021) under the umbrella of the Texas State Network and comprises over 50 stations with KRLD-FM in Dallas being the flagship station. Prior to 2009, Cowboys games were broadcast on 1310 AM KTCK "The Ticket" and 93.3 FM KDBN "The Bone", and also previously on 103.7 KVIL FM and 98.7 FM KLUV "K-LUV".

The network is one of two networks carrying the complete Dallas Cowboys schedule. Outside of the Cowboys designated market area, a separate network managed by Compass Media Networks has offered live commentary with a separate broadcast team to the rest of the United States since 2011.

== Announcers ==
The announcers are Brad Sham with play-by-play, Babe Laufenberg with color commentary, and Kristi Scales with sideline reports.

== Affiliates ==
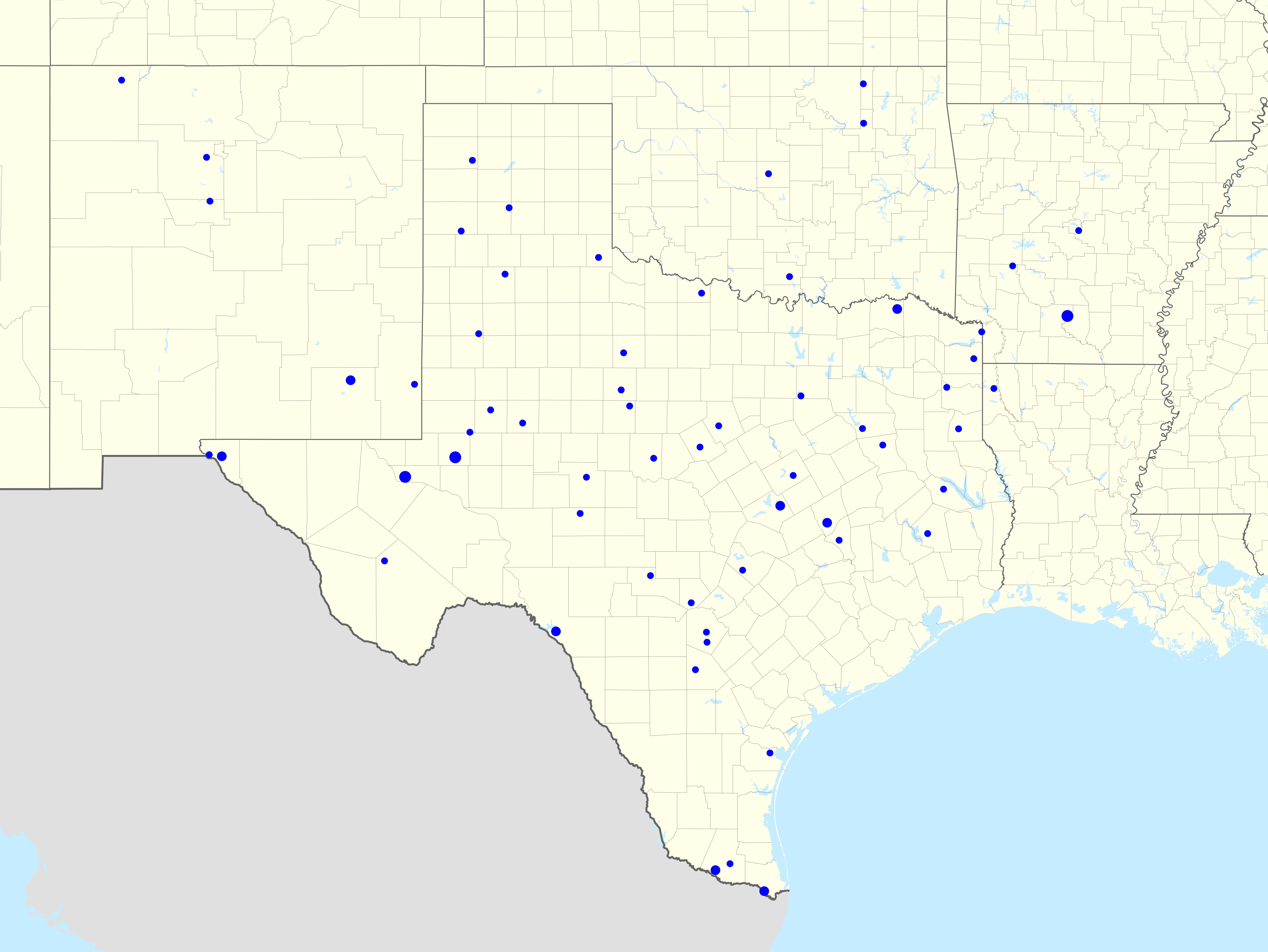
Map of radio affiliates.

=== Texas ===
City	Callsign	Frequency
Abilene	KTLT	98.1 FM
Alpine	KVLF	1240 AM
Amarillo	KGNC/KGNC-FM	710 AM/97.9 FM
Andrews	KQRX	95.1 FM
Atlanta	KPYN	900 AM/99.5 FM
Austin	KTAE	1260 AM/101.9 FM
Big Spring	KBST-FM	95.7 FM
Brownsville	KVNS/KHKZ	1700 AM/106.3 FM
Brownwood	KXYL-FM	102.3 FM
Carthage	KGAS-FM	104.3 FM
Childress	KCTX-FM	96.1 FM
Comanche	KCOM	1550 AM
Corpus Christi	KEYS	1440 AM
Dallas	KRLD-FM	105.3 FM
Del Rio	KDLK-FM	94.1 FM
Eagle Pass	KDLK	94.1 FM
El Paso	KLAQ	95.5 FM
Haskell	KVRP-FM	97.1 FM
Hereford	KPAN	860 AM
Henderson	KWRD	1470 AM/98.5 FM
Kermit	KPTX	98.3 FM
Kerrville	KAXA/KHCU	103.7 FM/93.1 FM
Killeen	KTON	1330 AM/100.9 FM
Livingston	KETX	1440 AM
Lubbock	KTTU-FM	97.3 FM
Malakoff	KCKL	95.9 FM
Marble Falls	KBEY	103.9 FM
Marshall	KMHT-FM	103.9 FM
McAllen	KVNS/KQXX	1700 AM/105.5 FM
Midland	KQRX	95.1 FM
Monahans	KPTX	98.3 FM
Odessa	KQRX	95.1 FM
Palestine	KYYK	98.3 FM
Paris	KFYN-FM	104.3 FM
Pecos	KPTX	98.3 FM
Plainview	KREW	1400 AM
San Angelo	KGKL (AM)/KGKL-FM	960 AM/97.5 FM
San Antonio	KJXK/KZDC	102.7 FM/1250 AM/94.1 FM
Stanton	KQRX	95.1 FM
Stephenville	KSTV-FM	93.1 FM
Temple	KTON	1330 AM/100.9 FM
Texarkana	KKTK	1400 AM
Tyler	KOOI	106.5 FM
Uvalde	KAXA/KHCU	103.7 FM/93.1 FM
Waco	KRZI	1660 AM
Wichita Falls	KWFS	1290 AM

=== Arkansas ===
City	Callsign	Frequency
Bearden	KHGZ/KBEU	92.7 FM
Camden	KHGZ/KBEU	92.7 FM
Glenwood	KHGZ/KBEU	670 AM
Hot Springs	KHGZ/KBEU	98.9 FM
Little Rock	KABZ	103.7 FM

=== Louisiana ===
City	Callsign	Frequency
Shreveport	KEEL	710 AM

=== New Mexico ===
City	Callsign	Frequency
Albuquerque	KQTM	101.7 FM
Artesia	KTZA	92.9 FM
Farmington	KTRA-FM	102.1 FM
Hobbs	KHOB	1390 AM
Roswell	KTZA	92.9 FM

=== Oklahoma ===
City	Callsign	Frequency
Ardmore	KVSO	1340
Bartlesville	KWON	1400 AM
Hugo	KFYN-FM	104.3 FM
Oklahoma City	KOKQ	94.7 FM
Tulsa	KRMG-AM	740 AM

== Spanish ==
A separate network broadcasts games in Spanish. The flagship station is KMVK 107.5 FM in Dallas. The Spanish announcers are Victor Villalba, Andres Arce and Luis Perez.

=== Affiliates ===
==== Texas ====
City	Callsign	Frequency
Abilene	KKHR	106.3 FM
Bryan/College Station	KTAM	1240 AM
Dallas/Fort Worth	KMVK	107.5 FM
El Paso	KBNA-FM	97.5 FM
McAllen	KVJY	840 AM
San Angelo	KQTC	99.5 FM
San Antonio	KLEY-FM	95.7 FM

==== Oklahoma ====
City	Callsign	Frequency
Oklahoma City	WKY	930 AM

==== New Mexico ====
City	Callsign	Frequency
Albuquerque	KRZY	1450 AM
Artesia/Carlsbad	KPZE	106.1 FM
Las Cruces	KAMA	750 AM
Santa Fe	KRZY-FM	105.9 FM

==== Nevada ====
City	Callsign	Frequency
Reno	KNNR	1400 AM

==== Mexico ====
City	Callsign	Frequency
Cancún	XHQOO-FM	90.7 FM
Celaya	XHMIG-FM	105.9 FM
Guadalajara	XHAV-FM	100.3 FM
Mexico City	XHDL-FM	98.5 FM
Monterrey	XHTEC-FM	94.9 FM
Querétaro	XHOZ-FM	94.7 FM
San Miguel de Allende	XHMIG-FM	105.9 FM
San Luis Potosí	XHOD-FM	96.9 FM
