= KLVQ =

Simulcasts with KNET, Palestine, TX
- Athens, Texas; United States
- Broadcast area: Tyler-Longview area
- Frequency: 1410 kHz
- Branding: 94.5 KLVQ & 95.7 KNET

Programming
- Format: Classic hits

Ownership
- Owner: High Plains Radio Network; (HPRN Radio Network, LLC)
- Sister stations: KCKL; KNET; KYYK; KWRD

History
- First air date: May 17, 1948
- Former call signs: KBUD (1948–1988)
- Call sign meaning: Love Radio Company (former owner); Q (former branding)

Technical information
- Licensing authority: FCC
- Facility ID: 38632
- Class: D
- Power: 1,000 watts (day); 139 watts (night)
- Transmitter coordinates: 32°9′22″N 95°50′31″W
- Translator: See § Translator
- Repeater: 1450 KNET (Palestine)

Links
- Public license information: Public file; LMS
- Website: hpr.network/texas

KLVQ (1410 AM) is a terrestrial American radio station, relayed by an FM translator, and simulcast with sister station KNET in Palestine, Texas, broadcasting a classic hits music format. Licensed to Athens, Texas, United States, the station serves Henderson County. The station is owned and operated by High Plains Radio Network, through licensee HPRN Radio Network, LLC.

On December 30, 2016, Lake Country Radio filed to sell KLVQ, KCKL, and translator K233BE to Monte Spearman and Gentry Todd Spearman's High Plains Radio Network for $250,000. The transfer of license was granted and consummation of the sale concluded on June 9, 2017.

== Translator ==
Broadcast translator for KLVQ
Call sign	Frequency	City of license	FID	ERP (W)	Class	FCC info
K233BE	94.5 FM	Athens, Texas	156850	250	D	LMS
