= KGNC =

KGNC may refer to:

- KGNC (AM) (710 AM), an Amarillo, Texas radio station
- KGNC-FM (97.9 FM), an Amarillo, Texas radio station
- KAMR-TV (PSIP 4 / digital 19), an Amarillo, Texas television station that held the call letters KGNC-TV from 1953 until 1974
- KGNC-FM#History (104.3 FM) an Amarillo, Texas radio station that operated from 1947 to 1950
