= The Indie-Verse =

Dallas, Texas; United States
- Broadcast area: Dallas/Fort Worth Metroplex
- Frequency: KJKK 100.3 HD3
- Branding: The Indie-Verse

Programming
- Format: Alternative/indie music

Ownership
- Owner: CBS Radio

History
- First air date: May 9, 2008
- Last air date: June 1, 2016
- Former frequencies: KRLD-FM 105.3 HD2 (2008–2009)

The Indie-Verse was an internet radio station based in Dallas, Texas, that served the Dallas/Fort Worth Metroplex as well as all of the United States through its internet presence with a diverse alternative and indie music format. Owned by CBS Radio, it was broadcast as an HD Radio subchannel of KJKK (100.3 FM).

== History ==
The Indie-Verse began as an internet-only station on May 9, 2008, broadcasting primarily an indie rock music playlist. It was programmed by Eric Landrum, who was promotions and marketing director for CBS Radio-owned KMVK, and aired as an HD Radio subchannel of KLLI (105.3 FM). The station became online-only when CBS Radio opted instead to simulcast KRLD (1080 AM) on the subchannel beginning on June 9, 2009. This change was made because Zune MP3 players supported HD Radio subchannels of FM stations but not tuning AM stations.

In 2010, The Indie-Verse was returned to HD Radio as a subchannel of KJKK (100.3 FM). This ceased on June 1, 2016, and was replaced with a classic country format; the last song was "Avocado, Baby" by Los Campesinos!.
