= KSAH =

KSAH may refer to:

- KSAH (AM), a radio station (720 AM) in Universal City, Texas, United States
- KSAH-FM, a radio station (104.1 FM) in Pearsall, Texas, United States
