= KLEY =

KLEY may refer to:

- KLEY (AM), a radio station (1130 AM) licensed to serve Wellington, Kansas, United States
- KLEY-FM, a radio station (95.7 FM) licensed to serve Jourdanton, Texas, United States
- KTFM, a radio station (94.1 FM) licensed to serve Floresville, Texas, which held the call sign KLEY-FM from 1998 to 2005
- Karl-Ludwig Kley (born 1951 in Munich) is the chief executive officer (CEO) and chairman of the executive board of the pharmaceutical company Merck.
- Heinrich Kley (1863–1945) was a German illustrator, editorial illustrator and painter.
