= KEYU =

KEYU may refer to:

- KEYU (TV), a television station (channel 31) licensed to serve Borger, Texas, United States
- KVWE (FM), a radio station (102.9 FM) licensed to serve Amarillo, Texas, which held the call sign KEYU-FM from 2014 to 2019
