= KWRD =

KWRD may refer to:

- KWRD-FM, a radio station (100.7 FM) licensed to Highland Village, Texas, United States
- KWRD (AM), a radio station (1470 AM) licensed to Henderson, Texas, United States
