= KRBV =

KRBV may refer to:

- KRBV-LP, a low-power radio station (95.1 FM) licensed to serve Bunkerville, Nevada, United States
- KKLQ (FM), a radio station (100.3 FM) licensed to serve Los Angeles, California, United States, which held the call sign KRBV from 2007 to 2008
- KJKK, a radio station (100.3 FM) licensed to serve Dallas, Texas, United States, which held the call sign KRBV from 1995 to 2004
