= KRGN =

KRGN may refer to:

- KRGN-LP, a low-power radio station (98.5 FM) licensed to serve Killeen, Texas, United States
- KVWE (FM), a radio station (102.9 FM) licensed to serve Amarillo, Texas, which held the call sign KRGN from 1986 to 2014
