= KJKK =

Radio station in Dallas

- Dallas, Texas; United States
- Broadcast area: Dallas–Fort Worth metroplex
- Frequency: 100.3 MHz (HD Radio)
- Branding: 100.3 Jack FM

Programming
- Language: English
- Format: Adult hits
- Subchannels: HD2: News/talk (KRLD simulcast); HD3: Sports betting "BetMGM Network"
- Affiliations: Jack FM

Ownership
- Owner: Audacy, Inc.; (Audacy License, LLC)
- Sister stations: KMVK; KRLD; KRLD-FM; KSPF; KVIL

History
- First air date: December 25, 1965; 60 years ago
- Former call signs: KBOX-FM (1965–1973); KTLC (1973–1976); KMEZ (1976–1988); KJMZ (1988–1995); KRBV (1995–2004)
- Call sign meaning: "Jack FM"

Technical information
- Licensing authority: FCC
- Facility ID: 63779
- Class: C
- ERP: 100,000 watts
- HAAT: 574.2 meters (1,884 ft)
- Transmitter coordinates: 32°35′2.5″N 96°57′49″W

Links
- Public license information: Public file; LMS
- Webcast: Listen live (via Audacy); Listen live (via Audacy) (HD3)
- Website: www.audacy.com/jackontheweb

KJKK (100.3 FM) is a commercial radio station in Dallas, Texas, and serving the Dallas–Fort Worth metroplex. It airs an adult hits radio format known as "Jack FM", one of three stations owned by Audacy, Inc. that subscribe to the format, along with KCBS-FM in Los Angeles and KZJK in Minneapolis. Jack FM uses a pre-recorded "Voice of Jack" who makes ironic quips and sarcastic remarks between songs. KJKK's studios and offices are along the North Central Expressway in Uptown Dallas.

KJKK has an effective radiated power (ERP) of 100,000 watts, the maximum for most FM stations. The transmitter site is off Plateau Street in Cedar Hill, amid the towers for several Dallas-area TV and FM stations. KJKK broadcasts in the HD Radio hybrid format, with its HD2 subchannel simulcasting sister station 1080 KRLD. The BetMGM Network, which features sports betting programming, is heard on its HD3 subchannel.

== History ==
=== 1965–1988: Easy Listening ===
On December 25, 1965, KBOX-FM ("K-Box") first signed on the air as the FM counterpart of KBOX (now KNGO 1480 kHz). KBOX-FM played easy listening and occasional jazz music while KBOX (AM) was a Top 40, and then country music outlet, during the 1960s and 1970s. The stations used the KBOX call sign because they were owned by John F. Box.

In 1973, the FM station's call letters switched to KTLC for "Tender Loving Care", a way to describe its beautiful music format. In 1976, the call sign was changed again, this time to KMEZ, carrying new branding as EZ 100. KMEZ also served as the flagship station for Southern Methodist University football.

=== 1988–1999: CHUrban ===
In 1988, KMEZ was purchased by Summit Broadcasting. After the purchase, KMEZ's call letters and easy listening format moved to 107.5 FM. At 12:01 a.m. on December 25, 1988, after two days of stunting with a loop of "Jam On It" by Newcleus, the station changed formats to a mix of CHR and urban music, commonly called the "CHUrban" format, which is the predecessor of rhythmic contemporary. The station later changed its call letters to KJMZ and re-branded as 100.3 Jamz.

During its time as KJMZ, on-air personality Russ Parr got his start in the radio business before going to Washington, D.C. to host a nationally syndicated morning show, which, at one time, aired on KBFB (97.9 FM). In 1995, Granum Communications bought KJMZ and KOAI. Granum tweaked KJMZ's format to urban adult contemporary. The station was renamed KRBV, V100, on September 1, 1995. KRBV was the only Urban AC station to cover the entire Metroplex. It was one of the top 10 stations in the market. However, tragedy struck: KRBV, along with KXTX-TV, KOAI and KYNG, were impacted by the Cedar Hill tower collapse on October 12, 1996. Three workers were killed and one was injured when a gust of wind caught the gin pole being used for construction of a new antenna for KXTX-TV. With their tower on the ground, the stations scrambled to get back on air. They were forced to use an auxiliary site for many months at a much reduced power output. Because of this, KRBV's ratings sank, and the station was unable to return to its success prior to the tower destruction. The only Urban AC station available today, KRNB, has rimshot coverage difficult to hear in both the southern and eastern sections of the Metroplex.

Also in 1996, the Infinity Broadcasting Corporation, a subsidiary of CBS Radio, bought Granum Communications, giving it possession of KRBV and KOAI. In December 1998, KRBV re-added hip hop music to its playlist, and was revamped as Adult Mix V100.3.

=== 1999–2004: Top 40 ===
On March 12, 1999, the station began stunting by looping songs from artists such as Rob Base and Eminem. Three days later, on March 15, the station changed formats to Rhythmic-leaning Top 40. The station was renamed Hot 100, calling itself DFW's Party Station. On May 28, 2001, at 11 a.m., the station changed its name again to Wild 100 while maintaining its Rhythmic-leaning Top 40 format. The first song on Wild was "Wild Thing" by Tone Loc. Wild became the Dallas affiliate for the Austin-based "J. B. and Sandy" morning show.

On March 8, 2002, the station exhumed an old KLIF stunt by declaring itself a "thing of the past." The station went dark for about three hours and came back with the same format and name. Later that year, the J. B. and Sandy Show was terminated. The station became a CBS Radio station when Infinity was renamed in December 2005."KRBV 100.3 Dallas 13 April 2001".

On the morning of April 1, 2004, as an April Fools' Day joke, the station's wake-up show was replaced by a pre-recorded episode of The Russ Martin Show. Later that day, Russ Martin was back on his regular station, Live 105.3, where he got calls from Russ Martin show listeners who thought this switch was permanent. Little did anyone know a major change was on the horizon for 100.3 FM.

=== 2004–present: Jack FM ===
On July 1, 2004, at 8 a.m., the station began stunting with a mix of music and soundbites featuring the word "Jack". At noon that day, the station flipped to adult hits as 100.3 Jack FM. The first song was "Where the Streets Have No Name" by U2. The Jack FM format had been successful in a number of Canadian cities. CBS Radio began putting it on several of its FM stations around the U.S., including Los Angeles, New York City, Chicago and other markets.

With the flip, KRBV's call letters changed to KJKK. For the first 11 years, KJKK was jockless, and rejected all song requests. It used the voice of Howard Cogan to make quips and sarcastic remarks several times each hour instead of having a DJ. In late 2015, the station added a few people for its on-staff while still keeping Cogan for station imaging. In the summer of 2016, KJKK dropped the "Playing What We Want" slogan, and changed it to "Everyone Agrees on 100.3 Jack FM", however, this change was reversed in early 2020, when KJKK brought back the "Playing What We Want" motto. To this day, Jack FM remains the second longest-running format on 100.3 MHz behind the beautiful music/easy listening format in its earlier years.

The station's playlist has a core focus on hits from the 1980s and 1990s, with some songs occasionally going back to the 1970s, 1960s, and even the 1950s. Most of the music is from mainstream rock and alternative rock, although other songs from the Top 40 charts are included. (This was done to avoid overlap with classic hits sister station KLUV (now KSPF). The KRBV call letters eventually went to a Los Angeles station for several years, also at 100.3 FM, but under different ownership (now KKLQ, owned by the Educational Media Foundation).

On February 2, 2017, CBS Radio announced it would merge with Entercom. The merger was approved on November 9, 2017, and was consummated on November 17. In 2021, Entercom changed its name to Audacy.

== HD Radio ==
=== HD2 ===
KJKK's secondary HD Radio channel was initially launched as "My HD" in 2004. In early 2008, it carried Las Vegas-related jazz standards sound under the branding "The Sound of The Strip".

In May 2018, "The Sound of the Strip" was replaced by urban contemporary-formatted "V100.3 HD2" with the tagline "DFW's New Hip-Hop and R&B". It was similar to the "Adult Mix V-100.3" format previously heard on the main 100.3 frequency from 1998 to 1999.

In October 2021, KJKK-HD2 switched to a classic country format previously heard on the HD3 signal. It also carried news breaks from the co-owned Texas State Network during the day.

On February 27, 2023, the classic country format on the HD2 subchannel was replaced by a simulcast of KRLD-AM's news format. The same goes for KSPF's HD2 subchannel.

=== HD3 ===
KJKK's HD3 signal was launched in late 2010 to broadcast a diverse indie/alternative format known as The Indie-Verse. It was previously heard on KRLD-FM 105.3 HD2. For a time the HD3 station carried the all-news and talk programming heard on sister station AM 1080 KRLD.

On June 1, 2016, KJKK-HD3 began broadcasting a classic country format.

As of mid-October 2021, KJKK-HD3 switched to a sports betting format under the moniker "The Bet Dallas" as part of Audacy's BetQL Network (now BetMGM Network).
