= KOFY =

KOFY may mean:

- KOFY-TV San Francisco, California (Channel 20), a television station that formerly used the call signs KBWB, KEMO-TV, and KTZO
  - KTCT San Mateo, California (AM 1050), an AM radio station that used the call sign KOFY from 1986 until 1997, under common ownership with KOFY-TV in that period
- KOFY (AM) Gilmer, Texas (AM 1060), a defunct daytime-only AM radio station that was deleted in 2012 and formerly used the call signs KBNB, KHYM, and KTLG until becoming KOFY in 1999
