= KNET =

KNET may refer to:

- KNET-CD, a low-power television station (channel 25) licensed to Los Angeles, California, United States
- KNET (AM), a radio station (1450 AM) licensed to Palestine, Texas, United States
- Network-management software for KDE and Linux
- Kangaroo Network, a TCP/IP stack by Spartacus/Fibronics
