= KTFM =

Radio station in Floresville, Texas

- Floresville, Texas; United States
- Broadcast area: Greater San Antonio
- Frequency: 94.1 MHz (HD Radio)
- Branding: 94.1 San Antonio's Sports Star

Programming
- Language: English
- Format: Sports radio
- Subchannels: HD2: 103.3 The App (Alternative rock)
- Network: ESPN Radio
- Affiliations: Dallas Cowboys Radio Network; Texas Rangers

Ownership
- Owner: Connoisseur Media; (Alpha Media Licensee, LLC)
- Sister stations: KJXK; KLEY-FM; KSAH; KSAH-FM; KTSA; KZDC

History
- First air date: March 25, 1991
- Former call signs: KWBC (1990–1991, CP); KRIO-FM (1991–1998); KLEY-FM (1998–2005)
- Call sign meaning: "KTSA-FM" (heritage call sign of KJXK, which signed on as the FM counterpart of KTSA)

Technical information
- Licensing authority: FCC
- Facility ID: 2543
- Class: C2
- ERP: 19,000 watts
- HAAT: 245 meters (804 ft)
- Transmitter coordinates: 29°19′38.9″N 98°21′18″W
- Translators: HD2: 94.5 K233DB (San Antonio); HD3: 103.3 K277CX (San Antonio)

Links
- Public license information: Public file; LMS
- Webcast: Listen live; Listen live (via Audacy); Listen live (via iHeartRadio); HD2: Listen live; HD3: Listen live
- Website: www.sasportsstar.com; HD2: wehiphopsa.com; HD3: www.1033theapp.com

KTFM (94.1 FM, "94.1 San Antonio's Sports Star") is a commercial radio station licensed to Floresville, Texas, and serving Greater San Antonio. It broadcasts a sports radio format and is owned by Connoisseur Media. On weekdays it has local personalities hosting sports shows, with ESPN Radio heard nights and weekends. The studios are on Eisenhauer Road in San Antonio.

KTFM has an effective radiated power (ERP) of 19,000 watts. The transmitter is on South Foster Road near Hildebrandt Road in San Antonio. KTFM broadcasts using HD Radio technology. On its HD-2 digital subchannel it features an alternative rock format branded as 103.3 The App.

== History ==
=== Texas Music KRIO-FM ===
At 6 a.m. on March 25, 1991, the station signed on the air as KRIO-FM. It carried a Texas music format. The station was owned by longtime San Antonio-area broadcaster John Barger. It was meant to appeal to listeners of the former KFAN-FM (101.1), which gave up its Texas music format the previous year, becoming a simulcast of Oldies station KONO 860 AM. KONO was also operated by Barger. Steve Coffman and Ron Houston, both formerly of KFAN, were the station's two initial air personalities. KRIO-FM's initial program director Lee Woods billed the format as "certified South Texas country". Woods said that unlike KFAN, who included rock and reggae in its playlist, KRIO would only play country.

The country format was short-lived and lasted just a little over a year. On Tuesday, March 31, 1992, the station flipped to a Tejano format, providing competition to established Tejano outlet KXTN (107.5 FM). Barger initially wanted to sign the station on with Tejano music, but was dissuaded by friends who felt that the format had not yet matured. Barger believed that KXTN's growth within the past year proved that the format had matured and the station was now ready for competition.

=== KLEY and KTFM ===
In September 1998, the station flipped to Regional Mexican as KLEY ("La Ley 94.1"). On January 7, 2005, BMP revived the KTFM call sign after it acquired KLEY from Spanish Broadcasting System. The call sign had been used on 102.7 FM (now KJXK) from 1969 to 2003.

When KTFM was revived, its name was "Jammin' 94.1", and its focus was on rhythmic oldies. As the station struggled in the ratings, KTFM shifted to a rhythmic AC direction by adding more current product and putting less emphasis on older material. It was aiming at a mostly female 25-44 and Hispanic demographic. By November 2008, KTFM began shifting to a rhythmic contemporary direction and was added to the BDS Top 40/Rhythmic reporting panel.

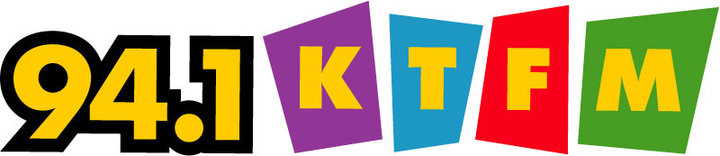
KTFM logo, 2000's

=== Hot AC and Top 40 ===
In February 2009, KTFM tweaked its format to hot AC. By April 2010, BMP shifted KTFM to contemporary hit radio, with a heavy emphasis on Dance crossovers.

On January 7, 2016, at 9 a.m., KTFM began stunting, at the conclusion of the "Blondie & Nugget in the Morning" show. The last song was "Here" by Alessia Cara. KTFM began calling itself "94.1 El Taco", giving away free tacos at various locations around San Antonio, playing the Parry Gipp novelty song "It's Raining Tacos" (a spoof of "It's Raining Men" by The Weather Girls). Its website emitted a green lightning strike with the word "Energize". At 4 p.m. that same day, KJXK began stunting with country music, leading listeners and rivals to believe KTFM was moving back to 102.7. At the same time as KTFM's relaunch, the stunt on 102.7 was revealed to be a publicity stunt.

At 5 p.m., KTFM transitioned back to rhythmic top 40 and relaunched as "Energy 94.1", with the first song being "Sorry" by Justin Bieber. The rebranding was done to emphasize its rhythmic/dance-focused presentation of current hits and club mixes featuring local talent, as well as distinguishing the station from KBBT and KXXM, two stations with similar formats.

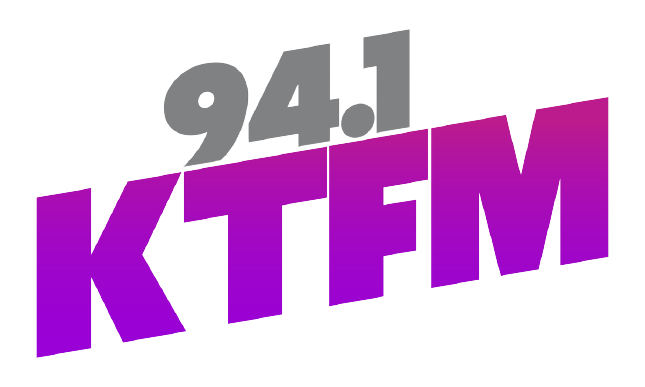
KTFM logo, 2014 - 2016

Former logo as Energy, 2018-2022

On February 23, 2016, "Blondie & Nugget in the Morning" were released from the station. On March 1, KTFM began carrying the nationally syndicated wake up show "Brooke & Jubal in the Morning". On August 1, 2016, the nationally syndicated "Tino Chochino Radio" was added for weeknights.

On August 20, 2018, "The Dana Cortez Show", hosted by Dana Cortez and Anthony Almanzar, began airing on KTFM after transferring from Rhythmic CHR rival KBBT, as the show became syndicated by ABC Radio. By July 2019, KTFM shifted back to a more mainstream Top 40/CHR.

=== Sports radio ===
On the morning of June 2, 2022, KTFM abruptly dropped the Top 40/CHR format. It began simulcasting sister station KZDC (1250 AM) as "San Antonio's Sports Star". This gave the sports format a full-power FM simulcast after it was already picked up on FM translator K277CX (103.3 FM).

Sports Star afternoon host Jason Minnix was excited about being on KTFM. He described the new signal as "37 times bigger than what we had yesterday" and comparing it as "like going from Wolff Stadium to Jerry’s World". The change took KTFM out of the Top 40 battle with KXXM, giving KXXM a monopoly on the format in San Antonio. KXXM, at the time of the move, ranked seventh in the market with a 4.7 share, while KTFM was eighteenth at a 2.0.

Previous logo

In February 2023, the AM-FM simulcast ended on weekdays. KZDC began carrying the national feed from ESPN Radio around the clock. KTFM continued with local hosts on weekdays, using ESPN Radio only on nights and weekends.

== KTFM-HD2 ==
On February 10, 2015, KTFM launched an alternative rock format on its HD2 sub channel, branded as "103.3 The App", relayed on translator K277CX (103.3 FM) in Terrell Hills. The first song on "The App" was "Take Me to Church" by Hozier. The station was named "The App" because it heavily promoted listeners to download the station's mobile application from iTunes and/or Google Play due to the station's weak signal over San Antonio, in addition to the lack of HD radios. Throughout the month of February and March, "The App" started off with 10,000 songs in a row, with a blend of 90's and 2000's rock and alternative mixed with today's alternative, but tended to be more indie rock leaning. Eventually, the station began airing short commercial breaks and promoted concerts, such as the Maverick Music Festival and Vans Warped Tour, and bands such as Smashing Pumpkins, Awolnation, Falling in Reverse, and Breaking Benjamin. By late 2015, the App began hosting concerts in the Alamo Lounge, owned and operated by Alpha Media, with bands such as Jimmy Eat World, Saint Motel, Blue October, Nothing But Thieves, Colours, and several local rock bands. By late April 2015, The App added one live personality, DJ Mighty Iris, and until May 2016, more personalities have been added such as REZ, Sam (from KJXK), and even a morning show hosted by Tony Cortez from KTFM.

On April 21, 2017, at 5 p.m., after playing "Steady, As She Goes" by The Raconteurs, KTFM-HD2/K277CX flipped to classic hip-hop (a format that was dropped by KMYO two days earlier, as both KMYO and KZEP-FM (which aired a classic-leaning Rhythmic Top 40 format) flipped to Spanish Top 40/CHR) as "G103.3". The flip comes as the ratings for the alternative rock format failed to attract listeners, posting a 0.8 in the March 2017 Nielsen Audio book. The first song on "G" was "Hypnotize" by The Notorious B.I.G.

On June 1, 2020, KTFM-HD2/K277CX changed their format to hip hop, branded as "WE 103.3".

On February 1, 2022, KTFM-HD2 rebranded as "WE 94.5", switching its translator from K277CX to K233DB (94.5 FM).

On December 1, 2025, KTFM-HD2 switched to the K277CX translator and revived the alternative rock format, bringing back "103.3 The App" after a nine-year absence.

Broadcast translator for KTFM-HD3
Call sign	Frequency	City of license	FID	ERP (W)	HAAT	Class	Transmitter coordinates	FCC info
K277CX	103.3 FM	San Antonio, Texas	147527	250	0 m (0 ft)	D	29°25′08″N 98°29′03″W	LMS

== Former subchannels ==
On June 9, 2022, KTFM launched a simulcast of Tejano-formatted KLEY-FM on its HD3 subchannel; the format is simulcasted on translator K277CX (103.3 FM).

On December 1, 2025, the KTFM-HD3 subchannel was dropped as the HD2 subchannel switched back to alternative rock, branded as "103.3 The App".

Broadcast translator for KTFM-HD2
Call sign	Frequency	City of license	FID	ERP (W)	HAAT	Class	Transmitter coordinates	FCC info
K233DB	94.5 FM	San Antonio, Texas	142569	250	0 m (0 ft)	D	29°26′30″N 98°30′23″W	LMS
