= KCKL =

Radio station in Texas

Simulcasts KYYK, Palestine
- Malakoff, Texas; United States
- Broadcast area: Athens, Texas
- Frequency: 95.9 MHz
- Branding: E-Tex Radio Network

Programming
- Format: Country; Texas Country
- Affiliations: E-Tex Radio Network; Dallas Cowboys

Ownership
- Owner: High Plains Radio Network; (HPRN Radio Network, LLC)
- Sister stations: KLVQ; KNET; KWRD; KYYK

History
- First air date: May 25, 1984; 42 years ago
- Call sign meaning: Lake Country (reversed)

Technical information
- Licensing authority: FCC
- Facility ID: 9715
- Class: A
- ERP: 6,000 watts
- HAAT: 90.0 meters
- Transmitter coordinates: 32°8′48″N 95°58′25″W
- Repeaters: 98.3 KYYK Palestine; 1470/98.5 KWRD Henderson

Links
- Public license information: Public file; LMS
- Webcast: Listen Live
- Website: facebook

KCKL (95.9 FM) is a radio station broadcasting a hybrid Classic country format, with an emphasis on Texas Country artists, in simulcast with sister stations KYYK and KWRD under the E-Tex Radio Network umbrella. Licensed to Malakoff, Texas, United States, the station serves the Athens, Malakoff and Cedar Creek Lake area of East Texas. The station is owned by High Plains Radio Network, through licensee HPRN Radio Network, LLC. KCKL also broadcast local sports from area schools.

On December 30, 2016, Lake Country Radio filed to sell KCKL, KLVQ, and translator K233BE to Monte Spearman and Gentry Todd Spearman's High Plains Radio Network for $250,000. The transfer of license was approved and consummation of the sale occurred on June 9, 2017. In May 2018, KCKL celebrates its 34th year of providing local oriented news, Country music, and sports programming for the Athens Hornets.
