= KMVK =

Radio station in Fort Worth, Texas

- Fort Worth, Texas; United States
- Broadcast area: Dallas–Fort Worth metroplex
- Frequency: 107.5 MHz (HD Radio)
- Branding: La Grande 107.5

Programming
- Language: Spanish
- Format: Regional Mexican
- Subchannels: HD2: Tejano music ("Fierro")
- Affiliations: KXTX-TV; Dallas Cowboys Spanish Radio Network; Texas State Network (HD2)

Ownership
- Owner: Audacy, Inc.; (Audacy License, LLC)
- Sister stations: KJKK; KRLD; KRLD-FM; KSPF; KVIL

History
- First air date: February 18, 1965
- Former call signs: KNOK (1965–1985); KDLZ (1985–1988); KMEZ (1988–1991); KCDU (1991–1992); KOAI (1992–2006)
- Call sign meaning: previous "Movin'" format

Technical information
- Licensing authority: FCC
- Facility ID: 23440
- Class: C1
- ERP: 17,000 watts
- HAAT: 574.2 meters (1,884 ft)
- Transmitter coordinates: 32°35′02″N 96°57′48″W

Links
- Public license information: Public file; LMS
- Webcast: Listen live (via Audacy); Listen live (via Audacy) (HD2)
- Website: www.audacy.com/lagrande1075; www.audacy.com/fierrohd (HD2)

KMVK (107.5 FM, "La Grande 107.5") is a commercial radio station licensed to Fort Worth, Texas and serving the Dallas–Fort Worth metroplex. The station is owned and operated by Audacy, Inc. KMVK broadcasts in Spanish and airs a radio format featuring regional Mexican music. The station's studios are located along North Central Expressway in Uptown Dallas and the transmitter site is in Cedar Hill.

KMVK has an effective radiated power (ERP) of 17,000 watts. Its signal is limited in that most Dallas-Fort Worth area FM stations run at 100,000 watts, but KMVK broadcasts from a tall tower at 574.2 meters (1,884 feet) in height above average terrain (HAAT), which helps improve coverage in the surrounding suburbs of Dallas and Fort Worth. The station broadcasts in HD; its HD2 signal carries a Tejano music format known as "Fierro", while Latin pop music was heard on its HD3 signal, known as "Dale!". The HD3 signal has since been turned off.

== History ==
=== KNOK/KDLZ ===
On February 18, 1965, the station signed on the air as KNOK-FM, an R&B and soul music station. It simulcasted its AM sister station KNOK (now KHVN), with both stations owned by the Chatham Corporation. The station was later sold to Black Enterprise magazine founder Earl G. Graves Sr. under the company name EGG Dallas Broadcasting Inc. (EGG are Graves' initials). KNOK-FM originally broadcast with 100,000 watts but from a tower only 450 feet in height above average terrain. In 1985, the station became KDLZ while retaining its R&B format. The coverage area was increased and the studios were moved to Cedar Hill after the original studios in Fort Worth were destroyed by fire.

=== EZ 107.5/The Oasis ===
In December 1988, Gilmore Broadcasting purchased KDLZ. On December 23 of that year, Gilmore picked up the easy listening format and KMEZ call letters from 100.3 FM (now KJKK) and moved them to 107.5. The station was then sold to Granum Communications in 1991; on July 4 of that year, Granum flipped the station and format to KCDU ("CD 107.5") with a short-lived classic rock format. A Smooth Jazz format began on November 2, 1992, moving over from 106.1 FM (now KHKS). The smooth jazz station took the call letters KOAI as "The Oasis". (The KMEZ call letters are now assigned to a New Orleans station, which airs an urban adult contemporary format). In 1996, KOAI was one of three radio stations that fell victim to the radio tower collapse in Cedar Hill on October 12 of that year. KOAI, as well as sister stations KRBV (now KJKK) and KYNG (now KRLD-FM), scrambled to get their stations back on the air through an auxiliary tower. "The Oasis"' ratings seemed to escape unscathed in the Fall ratings book that year, but the fate was not as good at the other two stations.

=== MOViN/Mega era ===
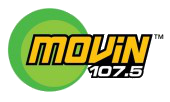
Movin 107.5 logo used 2006–2009.

"107.5 The Oasis" remained on air until October 2, 2006, at 5 pm, when KOAI flipped to rhythmic adult contemporary as "MOViN' 107.5." "The Oasis" then moved to 107.5 HD-2 (and today, is on an HD sub-channel of KVIL). The station's logo and branding was identical to MOViN' radio station KVMX (now KXJM) in Portland (then owned by CBS Radio, but is now owned by iHeartMedia). The initial format change to "MOViN'" caused a lot of criticism by listeners of "The Oasis", many of them demanded that the smooth jazz format be reinstated on the traditional signal. On October 9, KOAI changed call letters to KMVK to match the "MOViN'" branding.

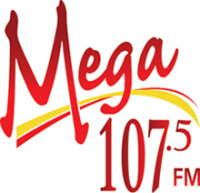
Mega 107.5 logo used 2009–2010.

On February 17, 2009, at noon, after playing "Vogue" by Madonna, KMVK flipped to a Spanish hot adult contemporary format as "Mega 107.5". In 2010, KMVK shifted to a Spanish rhythmic contemporary format (similar to its MOViN' predecessor) with a few English-language hits. It competed head-on with KESS-FM (La Kalle 107.9) for over two years, until that station's owner, Univision Radio, switched it to a simulcast of KDXX, leaving KMVK the only Latin pop-formatted station in the Metroplex for a short time. In late June 2012, it gained another competitor from Univision Radio with KDXX.

By mid-summer 2012, the Metroplex had three Spanish-language CHR stations and three English-language CHR outlets, with one of those English-language stations targeted towards Latino listeners. The former "La Kalle 107.9" from Univision Radio changed KESS (now KFZO) to "Radio H2O" in late June 2012. KTCY (previously owned by Liberman, now owned by EMF) was one of its short-term competitors until February 8, 2013, when that station's format was changed.

On March 8, the station's website displayed a message stating "Todo va a cambiar!" (Translation: Everything will change!), hinting at a possible format flip in the near future. However, the next morning, it was nothing more than a Daylight saving time announcement.

On May 21, CBS hinted at a possible format flip on either KMVK or KRLD-FM to "AMP Radio", much like its Los Angeles CHR/Top 40 sister station KAMP-FM, having registered three web domains. This format change instead happened four years later in 2016, when sister KVIL evolved to Top 40, though they would flip to alternative the following year.

=== 107.5 today ===
On July 26, KMVK did flip formats, though to a regional Mexican format as "La Grande 107.5", making it the third format flip since 2006. The Latin pop format is now heard on the KMVK's third HD Radio sub-channel.

On February 2, 2017, CBS Radio announced it would merge with Entercom (now known as Audacy). The merger was approved on November 9, and was consummated on November 17.

Months after, Entercom struck a new content deal with NBCUniversal–owned-and-operated stations KXAS-TV (NBC) and KXTX-TV (Telemundo). The latter will partner with KMVK to bring enhanced Spanish-language news, weather and entertainment information to its listeners, in addition to the current regional Mexican music format.

== KMVK HD channels ==
In early 2006, 107.5 HD2 began as a traditional jazz format to complement "The Oasis" before the station's smooth jazz format was relocated to the sub-channel. During that time, it was marketed as "Smooth Jazz in HD, The Oasis 107.5 HD2".

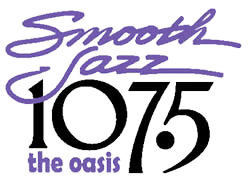
Former "Smooth Jazz 107.5 The Oasis" logo used between 2003–2006. Used on its HD-2 signal from 2006 to 2015.

On November 11, 2015, KMVK-HD2 began airing a Tejano music format under the name "Fierro" while "The Oasis" relocated to sister station KVIL on 103.7 HD2. "Fierro" also airs hourly news headlines in English via the Texas State Network.

In early February 2016, KMVK launched an HD-3 subchannel, originally named "Mega 107.5 HD3" using the slogan "Numero Uno En Exitos" (English translation: "Number One in Hits"), broadcasting a Latin pop format that previously aired on KMVK's main frequency from 2010 to 2013. On 2018, the channel was renamed "Dale!" (Spanish for "Go ahead") while keeping the current Latin pop format. As of November 2023, the HD3 channel has been discontinued with no programming replacement.
