= KTSA =

Radio station in San Antonio

- San Antonio, Texas; United States
- Broadcast area: San Antonio metropolitan area
- Frequency: 550 kHz
- Branding: News/Talk 550 KTSA and FM 107.1

Programming
- Language: English
- Format: News/talk
- Affiliations: ABC News Radio; CBS News Radio; Compass Media Networks; Radio America; Westwood One

Ownership
- Owner: Connoisseur Media; (Alpha Media Licensee, LLC)
- Sister stations: KJXK; KLEY-FM; KSAH; KSAH-FM; KTFM; KZDC

History
- First air date: August 1922; 104 years ago
- Former call signs: WCAR (1922–1927); KTSA (1927–1958); KAKI (1958)
- Call sign meaning: "Kum To San Antonio" (later Keep Talking San Antonio)

Technical information
- Licensing authority: FCC
- Facility ID: 71087
- Class: B
- Power: 5,000 watts
- Transmitter coordinates: 29°29′47.5″N 98°24′57.5″W
- Translator: 107.1 K296GK (San Antonio)

Links
- Public license information: Public file; LMS
- Webcast: Listen live
- Website: www.ktsa.com

KTSA (550 AM "107.1 and 550 KTSA") is a commercial radio station in San Antonio, Texas. KTSA is owned by Connoisseur Media and airs a news/talk radio format. Its studios, offices and three-tower transmitter site are on Eisenhauer Road in San Antonio.

Most hours begin with world and national news from ABC News Radio. Weekdays feature mostly local talk hosts by day, with some syndicated shows in afternoons and nights, including Dave Ramsey, Lars Larson, Dana Loesch and Red Eye Radio. Weekends include programs on money, health, home repair, cars, gardening and pets. Some weekend shows are paid brokered programming.

== FM Translator ==
KTSA programming can also be heard on FM translator K296GK at 107.1 MHz. Since KTSA is a Class B station broadcasting with 5,000 watts twenty four hours per day, the FM translator does not necessarily improve coverage, but it does afford listeners the ability to listen to high fidelity sound on the FM band.

Broadcast translator for KTSA
Call sign	Frequency	City of license	FID	ERP (W)	Class	FCC info
K296GK	107.1 FM	San Antonio, Texas	140646	250	D	LMS

== History ==
=== Early years ===
KTSA was first licensed, with the call sign WCAR, on May 9, 1922, to John C. Rodriguez's Alamo Radio Electric Company at 608 West Evergreen Street. The call letters were randomly assigned from a sequential roster of available call letters. (Prior to January 1923, radio stations in Texas were given call letters beginning with "W".) WCAR was initially assigned to the sole available "entertainment wavelength" of the time, 360 meters (833 kHz), which required it to establish a time-sharing agreement with the other local stations. WCAR was the first licensed radio station in San Antonio, however it was the second to begin broadcasting, taking the airwaves shortly after the short-lived San Antonio Express station, WJAE, debuted on August 5. A schedule published on August 16, 1922, covering the next five days, reported that WCAR and WJAE had an evening broadcast slot of one hour each.

In late 1924 WCAR was reassigned to 1140 kHz. The call sign changed from WCAR to KTSA in early 1927, reflecting the slogan "Kum To San Antonio", and later that year the station was assigned to 1130 kHz. On November 11, 1928, with the implementation of the Federal Radio Commission's (FRC) General Order 40, KTSA was assigned to 1290 kHz on a time-sharing basis with KFUL in Galveston. KTSA's full-time operation began on April 29, 1933, after the FRC approved WCAR's purchase and shutting down of KFUL.

In 1935, KTSA moved to 550 kHz, increasing its daytime coverage area by going from 1,000 to 5,000 watts. The station was owned by Southwest Broadcasting Company at this time, and it became an affiliate of the Southwest Network and the CBS Radio Network. KTSA carried the network's schedule of dramas, comedies, news, sports, soap operas, game shows and big band broadcasts during the Golden Age of Radio.

On October 28, 1940, KTSA played host to the first and only meeting between noted science fiction author H.G. Wells and radio dramatist Orson Welles, which occurred nearly two years after the panic created by Welles' broadcast of The War of the Worlds. An advertisement in the 1949 edition of Broadcasting Yearbook said KTSA had been a CBS affiliate for 20 years, delivering 25.1% more radio families in the daytime and 20.6% more radio families in the nighttime. The ad was aimed at advertisers who might otherwise want to buy time on NBC Red Network affiliate 1200 WOAI, which remains KTSA's rival to this day.

=== Top 40 Era ===
For a time the San Antonio Express-News Corporation owned the station. In 1956, rock and roll radio pioneer Gordon McLendon bought KTSA. He made it one of the first full-time Top 40 stations in America. KTSA became an overnight sensation because of the music and outrageous, for the time, promotions. One included a flagpole sitter at the O. R. Mitchell Dodge used car dealership on Broadway, and the KTSA Easter Egg Hunt, which swamped San Pedro Springs Park with thousands of listeners searching for a $1000 KTSA Golden Egg.

In 1957, KTSA got competition from AM 860 KONO, which changed to a top 40 format and hired several of KTSA's disk jockeys. By this time, McLendon had successful stations in El Paso (KELP), Dallas (KLIF), and Houston (KILT), and used the El Paso and San Antonio stations as farm teams for his larger markets. Because KTSA was located at 550 on the dial, his station promoted on the air that it played the "Top 55 Hits." Under McLendon ownership, KTSA obtained Federal Communications Commission (FCC) permission to use the call letters "KAKI-FM" on KTSA's planned FM station, reportedly to honor San Antonio's military personnel (with "KAKI" meaning "khaki", a type of fabric used in military uniforms). In 1958 KTSA's call letters were also briefly switched to KAKI. After KAKI-AM-FM letterhead and promotional materials were printed, management learned that the call letters could be pronounced as slang in Spanish for baby feces. AM 550 quickly returned to its KTSA call sign. And plans to put the FM station on the air were scrapped.

McLendon sold KTSA in 1965. The FCC had a rule at that time that a single owner could not own more than seven radio stations nationally. When McLendon bought his eighth radio station, San Antonio was one of his smallest markets. So he sold KTSA to Waterman Broadcasting, with Bernard Waterman as the president. KTSA remained one of San Antonio's most listened-to stations until contemporary music listening switched to FM radio. In 1969, KTSA signed on an FM sister station, 102.7 KTFM (now KJXK).

=== Switch to Talk Radio ===
In the 1980s, the Top 40 format moved over to KTFM, while KTSA switched to a full service adult contemporary sound, with some talk programming at night. By 1992, the music had been eliminated and the station became a fulltime talk outlet.

In 2000, KTSA and its FM station, then with the call letters KSRX, were acquired by the Infinity Broadcasting Corporation, a division of CBS. Then in 2007, KTSA and its FM station, 102.7 KJXK, were bought by Border Media Partners (BMP Radio) for $45 million. On July 27, 2009, Border Media Partners was taken over by its lenders in an "amicable manner," according to an FCC filing. Border Media had not made a debt payment in two years, according to the San Antonio Express-News. This resulted in BMP selling the station to L&L Broadcasting (a forerunner to Alpha Media) in 2013. Alpha Media merged with Connoisseur Media on September 4, 2025.

=== FM translator ===
On February 26, 2015, KTSA began simulcasting on FM translator K296GK 107.1 FM in San Antonio. It had been upgraded and moved from its original city of license in Pleasanton, Texas.

== Former on-air staff ==
KTSA staff inducted into the Texas Radio Hall of Fame include Ricci Ware, Brad Messer, Don Keyes, and Barry Kaye. Popular 1950s and 1960s rock and roll disk jockeys also included Bruce Hathaway, Pat Tallman and Charlie Vann. Mark Velasco was a popular KTSA host in the 1980s.

== See also ==
- List of initial AM-band station grants in the United States
