= Al Lewis (columnist) =

American journalist

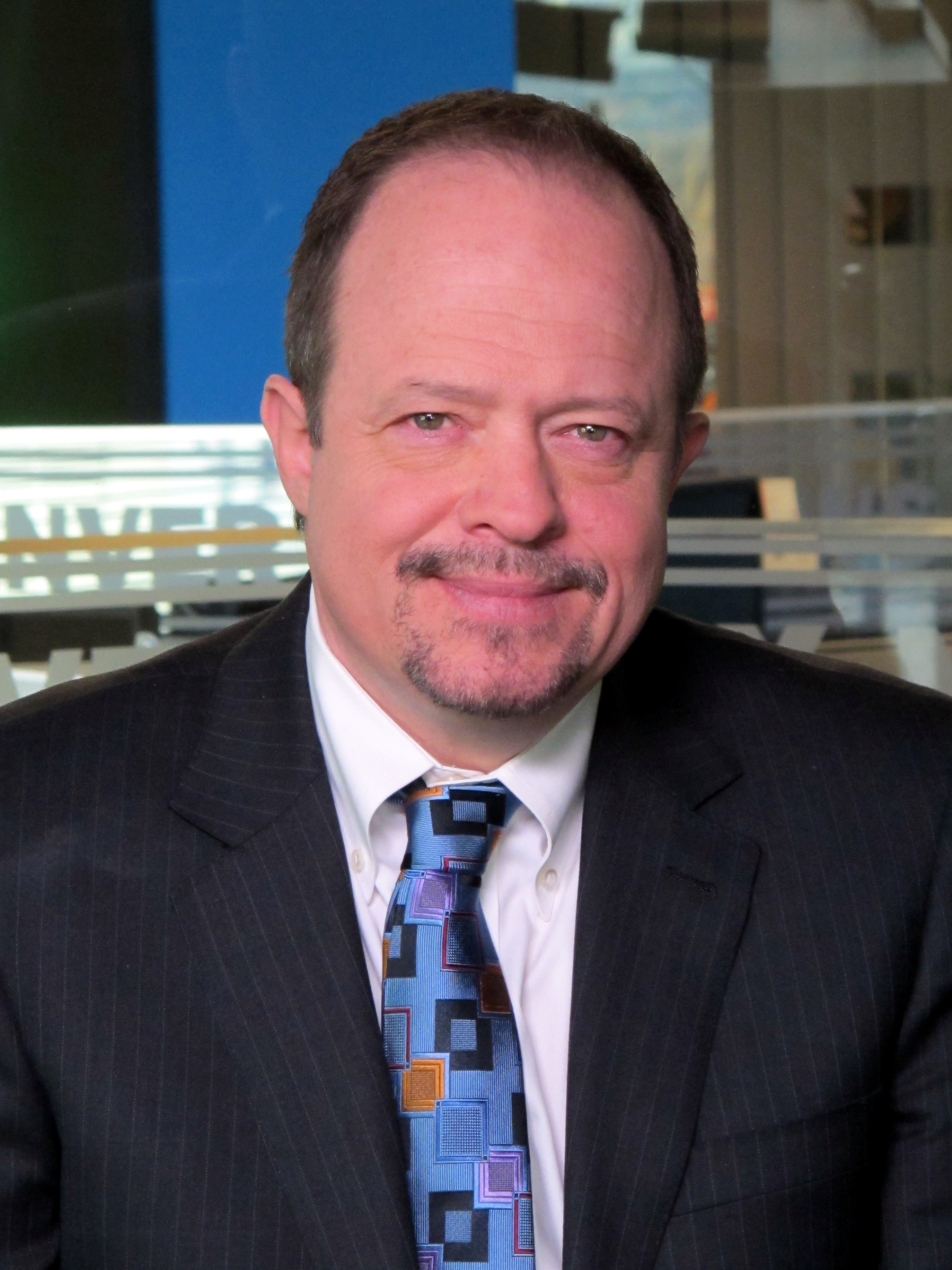
- Lewis in 2013
- Education: MacMurray College; University of Illinois Springfield
- Occupation: Journalist

Al Lewis is an American journalist who has served as a columnist for The Wall Street Journal Sunday, MarketWatch and The Denver Post. On April 1, 2016, he became business editor of the Houston Chronicle. On March 15, 2024, he launched Business Blunders, a Substack newsletter chronicling the biggest missteps in business.

== Career ==
Lewis grew up in Northbrook, Illinois, and earned a bachelor's degree in journalism and political science from MacMurray College in Jacksonville, Illinois, and a master's degree in public affairs reporting from the University of Illinois Springfield.

He has worked as either a financial writer or editor since 1985, including stints at the Amarillo Globe-News, The Gazette (Colorado Springs), and the defunct Rocky Mountain News. From 2001 to 2008, he was business columnist at The Denver Post. From 2008 until 2013, he authored "Al's Emporium", a column for Dow Jones Newswires, a service of Dow Jones & Co. A column he wrote through 2013 for The Wall Street Journal Sunday appeared in about 70 newspapers nationwide; the edition was discontinued in 2015. From 2014 to 2016, Lewis was editor in chief of South Florida Business Journal. Through 2015, Lewis also wrote a blog called Tell It To Al, and over several years, he frequently appeared on Fox Business Network and Denver's NBC affiliate, KUSA (TV).

Lewis often writes about big business, especially through interviews. His work is said to chronicle the human drama of business. To critics who call him "much more of a socialist than a free marketeer," Lewis responded thus in his final Wall Street Journal Sunday column: "I admire entrepreneurs and seek free enterprise for all. Unfortunately, some things stand in the way, including tyrants, idiots, and ideologies. And when you're a columnist, it's your job to point this out."

The Associated Press, the Society of Professional Journalists, the Colorado Press Association, and the Daniels College of Business at the University of Denver have honored Lewis for his writing and reporting. He also received column-writing awards from the Society of American Business Editors and Writers each year between 2006 and 2011. "Lewis shows that business writing can be fun and interesting as well as informative," a panel of SABEW judges wrote. Lewis won the William R. Clabby Dow Jones Newswires Award for his work in 2008 and 2009.
