= KETX (AM) =

- Livingston, Texas; United States
- Frequency: 1440 kHz
- Branding: 102.3 The Eagle

Programming
- Format: Classic rock
- Affiliations: Dallas Cowboys

Ownership
- Owner: Ken Luck

History
- First air date: August 23, 1957
- Call sign meaning: East Texas

Technical information
- Licensing authority: FCC
- Facility ID: 52895
- Class: D
- Power: 5,000 watts day; 91 watts night
- Transmitter coordinates: 30°44′23″N 94°55′30″W
- Translator: See § Translator

Links
- Public license information: Public file; LMS
- Webcast: Listen live
- Website: 1023theeagle.com

KETX (1440 kHz) is a terrestrial American AM radio station, relayed by an FM translator, broadcasting a classic rock format. Licensed to Livingston, Texas, United States, the station is currently owned by Ken Luck, who also serves as the licensee. The purchase from Telcom Supply was consummated on October 2, 2019.

== Translator ==
Broadcast translator for KETX
Call sign	Frequency	City of license	FID	ERP (W)	HAAT	Class	FCC info	Notes
K272FY	102.3 FM	Livingston, Texas	200935	250	213 m (699 ft)	D	LMS	First air date: August 2019

== History ==
KETX was initially proposed by Harold J. Haley Sr., Robert M. Sutton, & Donald L. Gulihur, under the corporate name of Polk County Broadcasting Company in September 1956. Originally intended to operate at 1220 kHz with 250 watts, the proposal was amended in November 1956 to move up the dial to the current 1440 kHz, operating at 1 kilowatt of power. A construction permit to build the 1 kilowatt facility, located 0.8 miles NNE of Livingston was granted on April 17, 1957.

The facility was constructed by Don Gulihur, who served as the facility's Chief Engineer, utilizing a Gates BC 1J transmitter, with the studios and tower co-located at the transmission site on U.S. Highway 59, receiving a License to Cover from the Federal Communications Commission on August 23, 1957.

Polk County Broadcasting would go on to further increase power to the current 5 kilowatt daytime signal, which was licensed on May 7, 1963, and involved a change of the transmitter to an RCA BTA 1MX driver and MS 363 amplifier.

The Haley family would own the heritage KETX for the next half century, operating the facility as a country formatted station for the majority of its life, until it was sold to Livingston Telephone, d.b.a. Telcom Supply, Inc. on October 8, 2008, after the deaths of both Hal Sr. and wife Peggy Haley. KETX is one of the few remaining stations operating in Texas that has been locally owned and operated throughout its existence as a broadcast station.
