= KXGL =

Radio station in Amarillo, Texas

Coordinates: 35.315°N 101.847°W

- Amarillo, Texas; United States
- Broadcast area: Amarillo metropolitan area
- Frequency: 100.9 MHz
- Branding: 100.9 The Eagle

Programming
- Format: Classic hits
- Affiliations: Premiere Networks; United Stations Radio Networks

Ownership
- Owner: Connoisseur Media; (Alpha Media Licensee LLC)
- Sister stations: KGNC; KGNC-FM; KVWE

History
- First air date: 1997 (as KPQZ)
- Former call signs: KPVY (1992–1997, CP); KPQZ (1997–2002); KJAZ (9/2002-10/2002)
- Call sign meaning: "Eagle"

Technical information
- Licensing authority: FCC
- Facility ID: 39781
- Class: C0
- ERP: 100,000 watts
- HAAT: 398 meters

Links
- Public license information: Public file; LMS
- Webcast: Listen live
- Website: www.1009theeagle.com

KXGL (100.9 FM) is a commercial radio station located in Amarillo, Texas. KXGL airs a classic hits music format branded as "The Eagle". Under ownership of Connoisseur Media, studios are located in southwest Amarillo (in the same building as sister stations KGNC and KGNC-FM), and its transmitter is north of the city in unincorporated Potter County.

== History ==
Prior to its existence as a classic hits station, KXGL was a Spanish language format station called, "La Picosita" with the call sign KPQZ. The station was purchased by Feuer/McCord Communications Inc. for US$3 million in 2002. Feuer/McCord Communications became JMJ Broadcasting in 2005. KXGL was sold to Alpha Media in September 2015.

On a Sunday night in October 2002, Amarillo got a brand new radio station with a unique sound beginning its broadcast with "20,000 Songs In A Row".

By mandate, there would be fewer commercials. There would be several times a day where there would be no commercials no. "Eagle Commercial Free Flights" would span 100 minutes with Classic Hits.

The on-air personalities were announced over time, with the morning show members added first. Internal research of current Amarillo morning programs, with some out of town names included, indicated potential listeners had a preference.

Jamey Karr & Morgan Tanner, both inductees of the Texas Panhandle Broadcasters Hall Of Fame, were lured from their post at crosstown KPUR-FM. In December 2002, Karr was named Operations Manager of KXGL, and Tanner was chosen for the Production Manager position. On January 2, 2003, Jamey & Morgan became the first personalities heard on The Eagle and became the # 1 morning show in August 2003, a ranking they held until Karr retired and Morgan Tanner moved to the midday time slot, a position she holds to this day.

Previous logo

100.9 The Eagle celebrated its 20th anniversary during the summer of 2023 with a large Birthday Party event for Eagle listeners, held at the Big Texan’s ‘Starlight Ranch’.

Alpha Media merged with Connoisseur Media on September 4, 2025.
