= KSAH-FM =

Radio station in Pearsall, Texas

Pearsall, Texas; United States
- Broadcast area: San Antonio metropolitan area
- Frequency: 104.1 MHz
- Branding: Norteño 104.1 y 720AM

Programming
- Language: Spanish
- Format: Classic regional Mexican and norteño music

Ownership
- Owner: Connoisseur Media; (Alpha Media Licensee, LLC)
- Sister stations: KJXK; KLEY-FM; KSAH; KTFM; KTSA; KZDC

History
- First air date: 2002
- Former call signs: KMMG (1998–2002); KMFR (2002–2004); KRIO-FM (2004–2011)

Technical information
- Licensing authority: FCC
- Facility ID: 83596
- Class: C1
- ERP: 100,000 watts
- HAAT: 299 meters (981 ft)
- Transmitter coordinates: 28°43′16.9″N 98°45′44.1″W
- Repeaters: 720 KSAH (Universal City); 104.1 KSAH-FM1 (Charlotte)

Links
- Public license information: Public file; LMS
- Webcast: Listen live
- Website: www.nortenosa.com

KSAH-FM (104.1 MHz) is a commercial radio station, licensed to Pearsall, Texas, and serving the San Antonio metropolitan area. KSAH-FM and sister station KSAH (720 AM) simulcast a classic regional Mexican radio format, specializing in norteño music. The station is owned by Connoisseur Media with the license held by Alpha Media Licensee, LLC. The studios and offices are located on Eisenhauer Road in Northeast San Antonio.

KSAH-FM has an effective radiated power (ERP) of 100,000 watts, the current maximum for FM stations. The transmitter is off Texas State Highway 97 in Hindes, Texas, about 40 miles south of San Antonio. Programming is also heard on 20,000 watt booster station KSAH-FM1 in Charlotte, Texas. Like KSAH-FM, it broadcasts on 104.1 MHz.

== History ==
The station was assigned the call sign KKMG on September 17, 2001. On September 11, 2002, shortly after signing on, the call letters switched to KMFR; on April 12, 2004, it became KRIO-FM.

Beginning in 2010, KRIO-FM began simulcasting with KSAH (720 AM). On February 10, 2011, the station changed its call sign to the current KSAH-FM. Beginning in 2012 and continuing for six years, the simulcast was discontinued when KSAH AM switched to a Spanish-language sports radio format, using ESPN Deportes Radio. When that network was discontinued in 2018, the two stations resumed their simulcast.
