= KZDC =

Radio station in San Antonio

San Antonio, Texas; United States
- Broadcast area: Greater San Antonio
- Frequency: 1250 kHz
- Branding: ESPN 1250

Programming
- Language: English
- Format: Sports
- Affiliations: ESPN Radio; Texas Rangers

Ownership
- Owner: Connoisseur Media; (Alpha Media Licensee, LLC)
- Sister stations: KJXK; KLEY-FM; KSAH; KSAH-FM; KTFM; KTSA

History
- Founded: July 16, 1952
- First air date: January 1, 1953
- Former call signs: KEXX (1952–1959); KARS (2/2/1959–2/21/1959); KEXX (2/21/1959–11/1959); KUKA (1959–1983); KVAR (1983–1984); KXET (1984–1989); KRNS (1989–1990); KZEP (1990–1994); KHBL (3/1994–11/1994); KZEP (1994–1995)

Technical information
- Licensing authority: FCC
- Facility ID: 65330
- Class: B
- Power: 25,000 watts (day); 920 watts (night)
- Transmitter coordinates: 29°17′1.9″N 98°28′29.1″W (day); 29°29′49.8″N 98°24′58.1″W (night)
- Translator: 103.3 K277CX (San Antonio)

Links
- Public license information: Public file; LMS
- Webcast: Listen live

KZDC (1250 AM, "ESPN 1250") is an all-sports-formatted radio station in San Antonio, Texas, owned by Connoisseur Media. Most of the programming comes from ESPN Radio. Its studios and offices are located on Eisenhauer Road in Northeast San Antonio.

KZDC broadcasts at 25,000 watts by day using a non-directional antenna. To avoid interfering with other stations on 1250 AM, it drastically reduces power at night to 920 watts and uses a directional antenna. The daytime transmitter site is just off U.S. Route 281 near Interstate 410, in the Mission del Lago district of San Antonio. The station uses a separate nighttime site which is co-located with sister station KTSA, along Eisenhauer Road in Northeast San Antonio, across the street from the studios.

== History ==
=== Early years ===
The original construction permit for what would become KEXX was initially granted by the FCC on July 16, 1952, to Manuel D. Leal. KEXX was to initially operate as a daytime-only station with 500 watts of power on 1250 kHz. The station originally signed on January 1, 1953, and would receive its license to cover on February 9, 1953, a little over a month later. The station's studios were originally located on 501 West Quincy Street. KEXX originally broadcast a Spanish-language full service format centered on traditional Mexican music.

On February 2, 1959, KEXX made a brief diversion to an English language format under the call letters KARS, operated by Les Miller Enterprises. Leal continued to hold the broadcasting license. By February 21, the previous call letters and format had been restored.

=== KUKA: "Fiesta Radio" ===
In November 1959, KEXX, while retaining the same format, changed its call letters to KUKA, which it bore for the next 24 years. The station took its call letters from a station secretary whose nickname was Kukita.

In May 1961, Leal sold KUKA to Por Favor, Inc., a company controlled by local attorney Alex Coe and son Marshall, for $200,000. The sale was completed on June 1. Under the Coes, the format largely remained the same. It was also under their stewardship that the station adopted the "Fiesta Radio" positioner.

On November 17, 1965, KUKA was granted authorization to broadcast at 1,000 watts, still as a daytime-only station. On August 23, 1979, KUKA was granted a construction permit to allow unlimited operation, with 1,000 watts at all times.

Stuart Epperson would acquire KUKA and Por Favor, Inc. from the Coes on July 28, 1981, for $850,000. Epperson already owned classical station KMFM (96.1 MHz) through holding company Classic Media; Epperson had acquired it in 1977. The sale closed in December, and under the new owners, the station changed to a bilingual Christian format presented primarily in English; The format featured a mix of Contemporary Christian music and talk programming. 17 staffers lost their jobs as a result of the switch. Newly appointed general manager Mel Taylor stated that the switch was made because the station's overall position in ratings and revenue began to decline. Taylor also noted that the new owners had no experience programming Spanish-language formats. The Quincy Street studios were sold to competing Spanish-language outlet KFHM (1160 AM), and KUKA moved into KMFM's studios in an office building on Fredericksburg Road.

=== Lotus Communications-era ===
In August 1982, after less than a year of ownership, Epperson sold KUKA to Lotus Communications, who had already owned KVAR 104.5 since 1977, for $875,000. This was to facilitate Epperson's purchase of KMAC (630 AM), which had been announced a month earlier. At the time, FCC regulations forbade one entity from owning multiple stations on the same band in the same market, and KMAC had a superior signal to KUKA's.

Upon Lotus' closing of the deal in March, the contemporary Spanish language programming that had been on 104.5 FM moved to KUKA, along with the KVAR call letters. Its new FM sister station then adopted the KXZL calls, along with a new rock and roll format. The two stations relocated to a 2,000-square-foot (190 m^{2}) office building located at 1130 East Durango Boulevard. By mid-1984, KVAR had changed its call letters to KXET, with the format remaining unchanged. The station started to brand as "K-XET Radio Éxitos" coinciding with the call letter change. Starting with the 1987 season, KXET also broadcast Houston Astros games in Spanish, although it lost the rights in 1989 to KRIA, as KXET could only commit to carrying 55 of the 162 games offered that year.

On June 1, 1989, KXET dumped the six-year-old Spanish format and switched to news and sports programming that primarily consisted of a 24-hour audio feed of CNN Headline News, using the new call letters KRNS. KXET also held a secondary affiliation with the Mutual Broadcasting System, carrying feature programs such as CBS Mystery Theater three nights a week, along with sports programming from the network. Additionally, KRNS signed up to carry Texas Rangers games beginning June 1. General manager Jay Levine simply said that the move was "just a business decision at this point in time", citing low ratings and an oversaturated Spanish language radio market. KXET had drawn a 1.6 rating in the Fall 1988 ratings book, second-lowest of the market's Spanish stations behind KRIA with a 0.4. 13 staffers were put out of work by the switch, with four engineers working in shifts to keep the station on the air. KRNS later acquired the rights to broadcast UTSA Roadrunners basketball for three years beginning with the 1989 season.

The new format lasted less than a year, and management pulled the plug on February 9, 1990, putting 10 staffers out of work. Levine stated that the station was "going to be missed by a select few" and that it was not "economically feasible" to continue with the KRNS programming. The station then switched to a simulcast of its FM classic rock-formatted sister, now called KZEP; the call letters were changed to reflect the simulcast. The UTSA Roadrunners broadcasts were unaffected by the format change. After listener demand, management announced that Mutual's Larry King Show would survive the transition to KZEP as well, remaining in its weeknight 10 p.m.to 4 a.m. slot. The Rangers were dropped by the station for the 1990 season.

On October 1, 1992, the station began broadcasting an all-sports format, with all programming being provided via satellite by the Las Vegas–based Sports Entertainment Network. Levine observed that "the AM band has run into a lot of problems through the last few years and in order to be successful, you have to try other things", adding that he felt the new format would be "unique and different". Notre Dame football, NFL games, and several college bowl games were also offered on the station.

KZEP abruptly dropped the sports format on April 1, 1994, at 1 a.m., switching to the Los Angeles–based Spanish language Radio LABIO network; the new KHBL call letters accompanied the switch. A station engineer noted that the station failed to crack the top 30 in Arbitron's ratings for San Antonio. This format lasted a little over seven months before the KZEP call letters and KZEP-FM simulcast returned.

In May 1995, KZEP flipped to a separately programmed, automated hard rock and heavy metal format to complement its FM sister station, adopting the present KZDC call sign in the process.

=== Radio Única era ===
On January 5, 1998, KZDC adopted a Spanish language talk format as an affiliate of the Miami-based Radio Única network; Radio Única had taken over operations of KZDC under an LMA with Lotus. Personalities heard on Radio Única included Pedro Sevcec and Isabel Gómez-Bassols, among others. On April 17, 2000, Lotus announced it would be selling KZDC to Radio Única outright for $1.8 million.

On February 9, 2004, Multicultural Broadcasting announced it would acquire Radio Única's assets, including KZDC, for $150 million, after Radio Única filed for bankruptcy protection the previous year. However, Multicultural would not retain KZDC for long. In January 2005, less than a year after acquiring KZDC from Radio Única, Houston-based Border Media Partners (BMP Radio) would acquire KZDC as part of a package deal with Multicultural for $5.75 million; the sale also included KFNI in Pleasanton and KVJY in Pharr. Upon BMP's closing of the acquisition, KZDC flipped to a Regional Mexican format branded as "La Lupe".

=== ESPN Radio-era ===
KZDC flipped to its sports format on February 4, 2008, originally branded as ESPN 1250 The Zone.

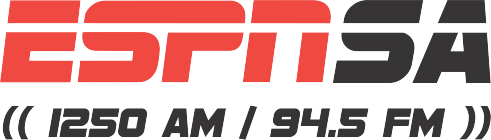
Logo before using the "San Antonio Sports Star" name

In the early 2010s, KZDC left its longtime transmitter site on San Antonio's East Side, which succumbed to redevelopment. BMP constructed a new 25 kW daytime site on the city's South Side, along with a new 920-watt night signal from KTSA's site. On October 14, 2013, BMP sold KZDC and the rest of its San Antonio cluster to L&L Broadcasting (a forerunner to Alpha Media) for $31 million. The transaction closed on January 31, 2014.

On July 19, 2021, KZDC rebranded from ESPN San Antonio to San Antonio's Sports Star, coinciding with the debut of a third local sports talk show on the station, which retained its ESPN Radio affiliation. On February 1, 2023, KZDC split from its simulcast with KTFM (which took on KZDC's local programming) and rebranded as "ESPN 1250", airing ESPN Radio's national programming 24 hours a day. Alpha Media merged with Connoisseur Media on September 4, 2025.

== FM translator ==
In December 2014, KZDC began to rebroadcast its programming on new FM translator K233DB at 94.5 FM. On February 1, 2022, KZDC switched translators from K233DB 94.5 FM to K277CX 103.3 FM. The simulcast on K277CX lasted until June 9, 2022, when it switched to a simulcast of tejano-formatted KLEY-FM 95.7.
