= KRLD (AM) =

Clear-channel news/talk radio station in Dallas–Fort Worth, Texas

- Dallas, Texas; United States
- Broadcast area: Dallas/Fort Worth Metroplex
- Frequency: 1080 kHz (HD Radio)
- Branding: NewsRadio 1080 KRLD

Programming
- Language: English
- Format: News/Talk
- Network: ABC News Radio; Texas State Network
- Affiliations: Premiere Networks; Westwood One; KXAS-TV

Ownership
- Owner: Audacy, Inc.; (Audacy License, LLC)
- Sister stations: KJKK; KMVK; KRLD-FM; KSPF; KVIL

History
- First air date: October 1926
- Call sign meaning: Radio Laboratories of Dallas (original owner)

Technical information
- Licensing authority: FCC
- Facility ID: 59820
- Class: A
- Power: 50,000 watts
- Transmitter coordinates: 32°53′25.5″N 96°38′45″W
- Repeaters: 105.3 KRLD-FM HD2 (Dallas); 98.7 KSPF-HD2 (Dallas); 100.3 KJKK-HD2 (Dallas)

Links
- Public license information: Public file; LMS
- Webcast: Listen live (via Audacy); Listen live (via iHeartRadio)
- Website: www.audacy.com/krld

KRLD (1080 kHz NewsRadio 1080 KRLD) is a commercial AM radio station in Dallas, Texas. Owned and operated by Audacy, Inc., the station runs news blocks during morning and afternoon drive time, with talk shows the rest of the day. Syndicated shows include The Chad Benson Show, The Dave Ramsey Show, Our American Stories with Lee Habeeb and America in the Morning with John Trout. Some weekend hours carry paid brokered programming. Some-to-most hours begin with ABC News Radio. The studios and offices are in Uptown Dallas.

KRLD is a Class A, 50,000 watts, clear channel station. The transmitter is in Garland, off Saturn Road. The daytime signal is non-directional from a single tower, with at least secondary coverage to most of North Texas and part of Oklahoma, as far north as Oklahoma City. KRLD shares AM 1080 with Class A WTIC Hartford, so at night, KRLD feeds power to both towers in a directional signal array. Even with this restriction, it still reaches most of the Central and Western United States with a good radio.

KRLD also broadcasts in HD Radio. It is simulcast over co-owned 105.3 KRLD-FM's secondary HD subchannel. KRLD is also available online via Audacy.

== Station history ==
KRLD first signed on the air in October 1926. It was originally owned by Radio Laboratories of Dallas, hence the call sign. At first it was on the air for six hours each day, except on Wednesdays when the station closed down to make repairs and recharge the batteries. The Dallas Times Herald, then published by Edwin J. Kiest, purchased KRLD within a year of its debut, in 1927. Since 1939, KRLD has broadcast at a power of 50,000 watts, the highest allowed by the Federal Communications Commission (FCC). In the summer of 1941, KRLD moved to 1080 on the AM dial as a result of the North American Regional Broadcasting Agreement (NARBA). During the Golden Age of Radio, KRLD carried CBS network programming, including dramas, comedies, news, sports, game shows, soap operas and big band broadcasts.

KRLD expanded into FM radio in 1948 with the original KRLD-FM 92.5 (now KZPS). The following year, it added a TV station, KRLD-TV Channel 4 (now KDFW).

For most of the 1960s and 1970s, KRLD ran blocks of different local programming, including middle of the road and country music, with some news and talk. In April 1978, KRLD switched from a music-based format to become, at the time, the third news and information station in Dallas/Fort Worth.

KRLD originally broadcast from the Adolphus Hotel in Dallas and for a time had its main studios in Arlington within the centerfield office complex at what is now Choctaw Stadium, when it served as the home of the Texas Rangers. In the summer of 2005, the station moved operations to a 5th floor office at the southwest corner of North Fitzhugh Avenue and Central Expressway in Dallas.

KRLD achieved several firsts in the field of radio broadcasting:

- first station to present live broadcasts of high school and college football games.
- first to offer continuous election returns.
- first to broadcast live music and entertainment programs. The Big D Jamboree, which originated from the since-demolished Dallas Sportatorium, was a regular Saturday fixture on KRLD in the 1950s and 1960s. KRLD also aired wrestling matches from the Sportatorium, with longtime sportscaster Bill Mercer calling the action.

History books dispute whether KRLD, KDKA in Pittsburgh, or WEAF in New York City (today WFAN) was the first station to broadcast commercial announcements on radio.

Branch Davidian leader David Koresh used KRLD to broadcast his messages in 1993 during his standoff with the government and the Federal Bureau of Investigation, near Waco, Texas.

Blue and red variant of the KRLD logo used from around 1999 to 2006.

During the 1970s and 1980s, KRLD was the flagship station for the NFL's Dallas Cowboys, with Brad Sham providing color analysis and later play-by-play. (Sham continues as the Cowboys' lead voice, though the team's games now air on sister station KRLD-FM.) Beginning in 1995, KRLD served as the radio flagship of the MLB's Texas Rangers, when its operations were based at Ameriquest Field's centerfield office complex. In 2009, weekday games moved from KRLD to KRLD-FM. KRLD relinquished the Rangers' English language radio rights in 2011 to sports radio station 103.3 KESN. Rangers broadcasts returned to KRLD-FM in 2015 with broadcasts moving over to KRLD (AM) when conflicting with other programming, such as Cowboy games, on the FM channel.

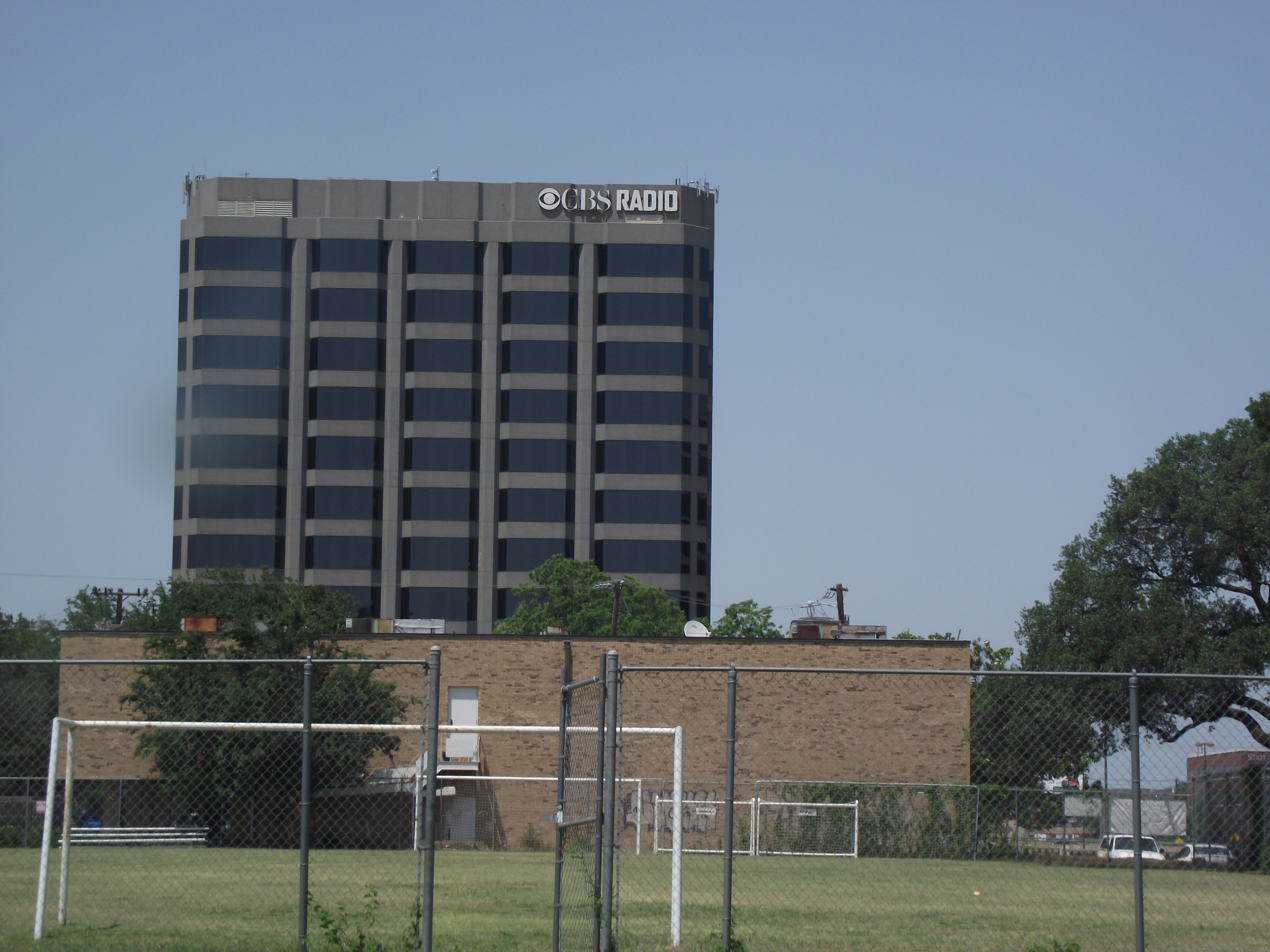
The Dallas, Texas CBS Radio building as viewed in 2011 from the campus of Dallas Christian Academy on U.S. Route 75.

Over the last several decades, KRLD has gone between being an all-news station and a talk station. On September 27, 2010, KRLD began broadcasting continuous news from 5am-8pm on weekdays, as well as weekend mornings, with talk programming at night and during most of the weekend. The weekday non-stop all-news format came to an end on June 17, 2024, when KRLD started carrying syndicated conservative talk host Chad Benson weekdays from noon to 3:00, breaking up the all-news block.

On February 2, 2017, CBS Radio announced it would merge with Entercom (now known as Audacy). The merger was approved on November 9, 2017, and was consummated on the 17th. Despite this, KRLD and former sister TV station KTVT (a CBS owned-and-operated affiliate) maintained a strong partnership up until April 26, 2018, when Entercom struck a new content deal with NBC owned-and-operated KXAS-TV.

Since KRLD's inception, it was a long-time affiliate of CBS News Radio for top-of-the-hour news headlines; audio simulcasts of the CBS Evening News were also presented on weekday evenings as well as other CBS News audio programming. During the week of May 17-23, 2026, KRLD, among other co-owned News and Talk stations across, changed its news affiliation to ABC News Radio, in advance of the impending closure of CBS's News Radio operation on May 22. This also marks ABC News Radio's return to the Dallas/Fort Worth market after 11 years of absence since crosstown News/Talk competitor and former ABC heritage WBAP (820 AM) switched to Westwood One News in 2015 and switched again to Fox News Radio in 2020.

== Honors ==
The Radio Television Digital News Association announced on June 12, 2013, that the KRLD Afternoon News had been chosen as the recipient of the prestigious 2013 National Edward R. Murrow Award for Best Newscast in the Large Market Radio category.

== Texas State Network ==
KRLD has long served as the flagship station for the Texas State Network, which provides KRLD and other stations around the state with news, sports and weather info. Some reporters are based at the KRLD studios, with others at the state capital in Austin and other parts of Texas.
