= KNET (AM) =

Simulcasts with KLVQ, Athens
- Palestine, Texas; United States
- Frequency: 1450 kHz
- Branding: 94.5 KLVQ & 95.7 KNET

Programming
- Format: Classic hits

Ownership
- Owner: Tiffany and Kristi Spearman; (Zula Com, LLC)
- Sister stations: KLVQ; KYYK; KWRD; KCKL

History
- First air date: January 2, 1936
- Former call signs: KNET (1936–1987); KYYK (1987)

Technical information
- Licensing authority: FCC
- Facility ID: 72837
- Class: C
- Power: 630 watts
- Transmitter coordinates: 31°46′22.00″N 95°36′59.00″W
- Translator: See § Translator
- Repeater: 1410 KLVQ Athens

Links
- Public license information: Public file; LMS

KNET (1450 AM) is a terrestrial American radio station, relayed by an FM translator, simulcast with sister station KLVQ in Athens, and broadcasting a classic hits format, primarily focused on the decades of the 1980s and 1990s. Licensed to Palestine, Texas, United States, the station is currently owned by Tiffany and Kristi Spearman through licensee Zula Com, LLC.

== Translator ==
Broadcast translator for KNET
Call sign	Frequency	City of license	FID	ERP (W)	HAAT	Class	Transmitter coordinates	FCC info	Notes
K239AM	95.7 FM	Palestine, Texas	156885	250	105 m (344 ft)	D	31°46′21.40″N 95°36′59.20″W	LMS	First air date: October 11, 2007

== History ==
The station was assigned the call letters KYYK on July 1, 1987. On September 21, 1987, the station changed its call sign to the current KNET.

On April 6, 2022, KNET flipped its format from news/talk to classic hits.
