= KRLD-FM =

Radio station in Dallas, Texas, US

- Dallas, Texas; United States
- Broadcast area: Dallas–Fort Worth metroplex
- Frequencies: 105.3 MHz (HD Radio); SiriusXM Channel 99
- Branding: 105.3 The Fan

Programming
- Language: English
- Format: Sports
- Subchannels: HD-2: News (KRLD-AM); HD-3: Westwood One Sports
- Network: Westwood One Sports
- Affiliations: Dallas Cowboys; Texas Rangers; Dallas Mavericks; KXAS-TV

Ownership
- Owner: Audacy, Inc.
- Sister stations: KRLD

History
- First air date: 1960
- Former call signs: KPSD (1960–1962); KMAP (1962–1968); KXXK (1968–1971); KOAX (1971–1984); KQZY (1984–1990); KRSR (1990–1992); KRRM (1992); KYNG (1992–2003); KLLI (2003–2008)

Technical information
- Licensing authority: FCC

Links
- Public license information: Public file; LMS
- Webcast: Listen live (via Audacy)
- Website: www.audacy.com/1053thefan

KRLD-FM (105.3 MHz, "105-3 The Fan") is a commercial radio station licensed to Dallas, Texas. KRLD-FM is owned by Audacy, Inc., and airs a sports radio format.

KRLD-FM is the flagship station of the Dallas Cowboys Radio Network and the Texas Rangers Radio Network. Some early hours on weekends are paid brokered programming.

== History ==
KQZY changed its format to hot AC as "Star 105.3" in September 1989, taking the new call sign KRSR the following summer. "Star" featured such personalities as Bob Nelson, John McCarty, Teri Richardson, Mike Sheppard, Stoobie Doak and Scott Carpenter, who also served as program director. Ratings remained low, and on January 27, 1992, following a 2-day electronic countdown, Alliance Broadcasting (based in Walnut Creek, California) launched the first "Young Country" station on 105.3 FM with the station temporarily taking the call sign KRRM before becoming KYNG in February.

After being acquired by Infinity Broadcasting (the forerunner to CBS Radio), KYNG changed format from country music to a combination of hot talk and active rock music on April 3, 2000. The final song on "Young Country" was "The Dance" by Garth Brooks.

On December 8, 2008, at 3 p.m., KLLI switched to a sports talk format, branded as "105.3 The Fan". This change was not a complete overhaul as some hosts, notably morning host Jagger and some of his morning crew, survived the shift, while others, including Russ Martin, were not retained.

On May 21, 2012, CBS Radio hinted at a possible format flip for either KRLD-FM or KMVK to "AMP Radio", much like its co-owned Los Angeles contemporary hit radio station KAMP-FM, as CBS registered three web domains, but neither station changed to that format.

On February 2, 2017, CBS Radio announced it would merge with Entercom (now known as Audacy). The merger was approved on November 9, 2017, and was consummated on November 17.

Months after on April 26, 2018, Entercom struck a new content deal with NBCUniversal-owned-and-operated stations KXAS-TV (NBC) and KXTX-TV (Telemundo). The former will be partnered with this station to bring enhanced local sports news and scores to its audience.

It was announced on September 3, 2026 that KRLD-FM will be the new flagship station of the Dallas Mavericks NBA team's games starting with the 2026-27 season. Previously, the Mavericks games were broadcast on mainstream rock-formatted KEGL for 5 years.

== HD radio ==
105.3 HD-2 was originally launched in 2005 as a Spanish version of their "Live/Free FM" format. In 2008, the HD-2 channel shifted to an indie rock-formatted playlist from internet radio station The Indie-Verse via a secured internet feed. In June 2009, The Indie-Verse was dumped in favor of the simulcast of KRLD NewsRadio 1080 AM. The reason was the new Microsoft Zune player's feature which allowed listeners to hear HD stations as well as MP3 files, but wouldn't be able to tune into AM stations.

105.3 HD-3 aired an all-"Dallas Cowboys Radio" format, which carried archived football games and talk shows about the Cowboys, with the overnight hours occupied by CBS Sports Radio. As of 2023, the HD3 channel is now broadcasting Westwood One Sports (the successor to Infinity Sports Radio and CBS Sports Radio) full-time.

== Play-by-play rights ==
=== Dallas Cowboys ===
KRLD-FM has been the flagship station for the Dallas Cowboys National Football League team since the 2009 season. The deal revived the long association the Cowboys had with KRLD (AM) in the 1970s and 1980s. It features regular appearances by team owner Jerry Jones.

=== Texas Rangers ===
The Texas Rangers of Major League Baseball aired their games from Monday through Friday on 105.3 The Fan in the 2009 and 2010 seasons (the latter was their pennant-winning year). Weekend games were still on KRLD NewsRadio 1080. After that season, the Rangers did not renew the contract. Games from 2011 to 2014 were on rival station 103.3 ESPN in English and on 1540 KZMP in Spanish, which continued with Spanish-language rights until ESPN Deportes Radio's demise, in which they were moved to another Spanish sports station KFLC 1270 AM. Rangers games (including weekends) returned to 105.3 The Fan starting in the 2015 season.

=== Dallas Mavericks ===
Starting with the 2026–27 NBA season, the Dallas Mavericks NBA games will be airing on this station. Chuck Cooperstein will be the play-by-play announcer as well as host of "Inside the Mavs". KRLD-FM will also feature other programming related to the team such as “Mavs Basketball Hour”, “Mavs Beyond the Court”, and “Mavs Insider Access”.

== History of call letters ==
The call letters KRLD-FM were originally assigned to a Dallas station that began broadcasting March 21, 1948. As only the third FM station in Dallas, it broadcast on 92.5 MHz with 50 kW power. The licensee was KRLD Radio Corporation, which also owned 1080 KRLD.
