= KHOB =

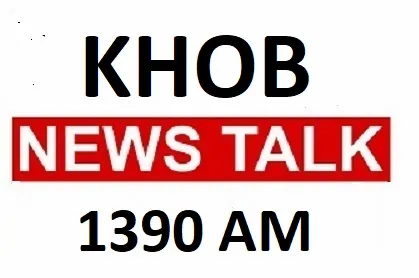

Hobbs, New Mexico; United States
- Broadcast area: Southwestern New Mexico
- Frequency: 1390 kHz

Programming
- Format: Defunct (was news/talk)

Ownership
- Owner: American Asset Management

History
- First air date: August 26, 1954
- Last air date: June 24, 2022
- Former call signs: KHOB (1954–1996); KUCU (1996–1998)

Technical information
- Licensing authority: FCC
- Facility ID: 1313
- Class: B
- Power: 5,000 watts day; 500 watts night
- Transmitter coordinates: 32°44′21.41″N 103°10′49.75″W

Links
- Public license information: Public file; LMS

KHOB (1390 AM) was a radio station licensed to Hobbs, New Mexico, United States. The station was last owned by American Asset Management.

On May 21, 2017, KHOB changed to an adult standards format with local news and events. It previously carried a sports format.

KHOB went off the air June 24, 2022. The Federal Communications Commission cancelled the station’s license on April 29, 2024.
