= KJXK =

Radio station in San Antonio

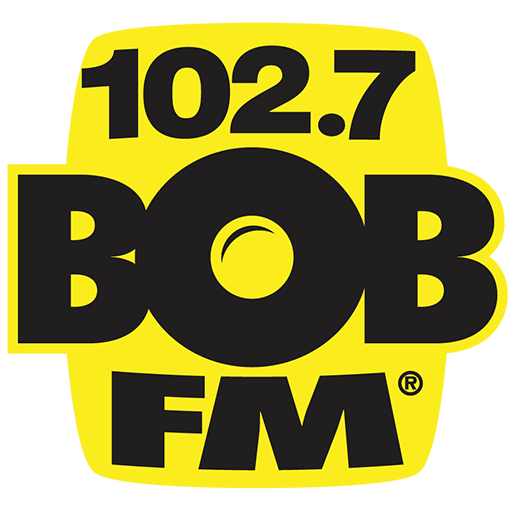
- San Antonio, Texas; United States
- Broadcast area: Greater San Antonio
- Frequency: 102.7 MHz
- Branding: 102.7 Bob FM

Programming
- Format: Adult hits

Ownership
- Owner: Connoisseur Media; (Alpha Media Licensee LLC)
- Sister stations: KLEY-FM; KSAH; KSAH-FM; KTFM; KTSA; KZDC

History
- First air date: December 3, 1969
- Former call signs: KTSA-FM (CP, never used on-air); KTFM (1969–2003); KSRX (2003–2006)
- Call sign meaning: Station was a franchise of the Jack FM format

Technical information
- Licensing authority: FCC
- Facility ID: 71086
- Class: C1
- ERP: 100,000 watts
- HAAT: 202 meters (663 ft)
- Transmitter coordinates: 29°25′6.8″N 98°29′2.1″W

Links
- Public license information: Public file; LMS
- Webcast: Listen live; Listen live (via Audacy); Listen live (via iHeartRadio)
- Website: www.1027bobfm.com

KJXK (102.7 FM) is a commercial radio station in San Antonio, Texas airing an adult hits format branded as "Bob FM". The station is owned by Connoisseur Media with radio studios on Eisenhauer Road in Northeast San Antonio.

KJXK has an effective radiated power (ERP) of 100,000 watts. The transmitter is atop Tower of the Americas in downtown San Antonio, off Cesar Chavez Boulevard.

== History ==
=== Early years ===
The station had its initial construction permit issued on November 20, 1967, as the FM counterpart of KTSA (550 AM). On June 7, 1968, it was given the call sign KTSA-FM, which was shortened to KTFM prior to sign-on. KTFM officially went on the air for the first time on December 3, 1969. It was originally owned by Waterman Broadcasting of Texas and it largely simulcasted KTSA.

In 1972, management decided to switch KTFM to progressive rock. This format lasted until 1976, when it shifted towards a more structured album rock format, playing the most popular tracks from top selling albums.

=== Top 40 ===
In 1980, the station dropped its album rock format for Top 40/CHR. Its Top 40 format would later evolve into a Rhythmic Top 40 direction in late 1988. KTFM was one of three dominant Top 40 stations in San Antonio, competing with the other two dominant CHR stations, KSAQ (96.1 FM, now KXXM) and KITY (92.9 FM, now Regional Mexican KROM).

Throughout the 1980s and 1990s, KTFM was a radio partner of Santikos Theatres. The station promoted itself in the policy trailers for the theater chain, as well as aired movie reviews and special screening announcements for the theaters.

In March 2000, Waterman reached a deal to sell KTFM and KTSA to Infinity Broadcasting for $90 million, as Waterman was looking to focus solely on its television assets. That same year, the Top 40 market would be shaken up by the arrival of a move-in at the 98.5 FM frequency. KBBT was launched as "The Beat", with a rhythmic format featuring hip-hop music. The Beat quickly climbed up in the ratings."KTFM 102.7 San Antonio 28 May 2000".

In August 2001, KTFM decided to challenge KBBT by changing from Mainstream Top 40 to a more rhythmic-leaning format as "Wild 102-7". KBBT had the hip hop audience, and KTFM started to see its ratings decline.

=== K-Rock and Jack FM ===
On October 24, 2003, KTFM dropped the Top 40 format after 17 years and flipped to mainstream rock as "102.7 K-Rock." The call letters became KSRX. The first song on "K-Rock" was "Welcome to the Jungle" by Guns N' Roses. However, KISS-FM was the veteran rock station in San Antonio, and KSRX was unable to compete for rock listeners.

On January 1, 2006, after a brief "Free FM" stunt, KSRX flipped to adult hits as "102.7 Jack FM", and changed call letters to KJXK. The first song on Jack FM was "Get Ready for This" by 2 Unlimited.

=== Changes in Ownership ===
In August 2006, CBS Radio sold KJXK and KTSA to Border Media Partners (BMP) for $45 million. BMP had revived the KTFM calls in 2005 on 94.1 FM, which has since reverted to its well-known Top 40 format.

On October 14, 2013, BMP sold KJXK and the rest of its San Antonio cluster to L&L Broadcasting (a forerunner of Alpha Media) for $31 million. The transaction closed on January 31, 2014.

On January 7, 2016, at 4 p.m., after a half-hour of "goodbye"-themed songs (ending with "Someone like You" by Adele), KJXK briefly stunted with country music. During the stunt, it kept the “Jack FM” name, but included barnyard sounds in the bumpers and branded the Facebook page as "102.7 Yeehaw FM". As sister station KTFM was stunting at the same time, this led listeners to believe KTFM was moving back to 102.7 FM. However, at 5 p.m., “Jack” returned, and the country music was revealed to be a publicity stunt.

=== From Jack to Bob ===
Alpha Media merged with Connoisseur Media on September 4, 2025. In June of that year, the station temporarily dropped the "Jack FM" branding, rebranding as simply "San Antonio's 102.7", to the point Alpha would briefly shut down the webstream, redirecting listeners to the iHeartRadio webstream. While rumors of a format change started with this move, the "Jack" branding and webstream would return in July and would stay through the remainder of the year.

At midnight on January 1, 2026, on what would've been the "Jack FM" format's official 20th anniversary, after playing "In The End" by Linkin Park, "Turn the Page" by Bob Seger and the Silver Bullet Band and "Bye Bye Bye" by NSYNC, KJXK began stunting with a continuous loop of the Cisco hold music, with a computerized voice periodically counting down to January 5; prior to this, the "San Antonio's 102.7" brand would silently return to the station's website and social media during the preceding Christmas 2025 season.

At 7 a.m. on January 5, KJXK ended its five-day hold-music stunt with a comedy skit depicting a caller being endlessly transferred through various fictional station departments before reaching "Bob's" voicemail. The station then relaunched as 102.7 Bob FM, though keeping its adult hits format; it simply switches from one national brand of the format to another with the move, though the format is customized to serve the San Antonio market as opposed to a national feed. The first song played under the "Bob FM" branding was "Video Killed the Radio Star" by The Buggles.
