= Amarillo Globe-News =

Daily newspaper in Amarillo, Texas

- Type: Daily newspaper
- Format: Broadsheet
- Owner: USA Today Co.
- Founded: 1909 (as The Amarillo Daily News)
- Headquarters: Amarillo, Texas; United States
- Circulation: 4,935 (as of 2023)
- Website: amarillo.com

The Amarillo Globe-News is a daily newspaper in Amarillo, Texas, owned by USA Today Co. The newspaper is based at downtown's FirstBank Southwest Tower, but is printed at a facility in Lubbock.

== History ==
The current-day Globe-News is a combination of several newspapers previously published in Amarillo. One began on November 4, 1909, as a prohibition publication by the Baptist deacon Dr. Joseph Elbert Nunn (1851 – 1938). In 1916, Nunn turned the Amarillo Daily News into a general newspaper.

Nunn also owned an electric company, and heavily invested in the telephone company. He served on the boards of the Wayland Baptist College (now Wayland Baptist University) in Plainview, Texas, then at Texas Technological College (now Texas Tech University).

He went on to Lubbock, Texas, with the Goodnight Baptist College in the now ghost town of Goodnight in Armstrong County. The college and town were named for the legendary Texas Panhandle rancher Charles Goodnight.

In 1926, Eugene A. Howe and Wilbur Clayton Hawk bought the Amarillo Daily News and merged it with their Globe newspaper to form the Amarillo Globe-News Publishing Company.

The Amarillo Times started on December 15, 1937, as an afternoon tabloid newspaper. On December 2, 1951, the Globe-News and Times were merged into one company with the majority of the stock owned by the Times' Roy Whittenburg family, being published by Samuel Benjamin Whittenburg (1914 – 1992). The Daily News continued as the morning newspaper, while the Globe-News and Times were merged into the afternoon Globe-Times.

The Amarillo Globe-Times won the 1961 Pulitzer Prize for Public Service for exposing government corruption in Potter and Randall counties. The organization noted the paper "expos[ed] a breakdown in local law enforcement with resultant punitive action that swept lax officials from their posts and brought about the election of a reform slate."

The company also purchased radio stations WDAG and KGRS (merging them to form KGNC in 1935), and NBC television station KGNC-TV (now KAMR) in 1953.

On September 1, 1972, Morris Communications bought the Globe-News from the Whittenburg family.

In 2001, the Daily News and Globe-Times merged into one morning edition, the Globe-News.

In 2017, Morris Communications sold its newspapers to GateHouse Media.

The Globe-News moved in September 2018 from the building it occupied since 1949 on South Harrison Street on the west side of downtown. The newspaper chose to move to the FirstBank Southwest Tower on Tyler Street a few blocks away.

Effective July 10, 2023, the paper transitioned from carrier delivery to delivery via the U.S. Postal Service.

== Journalists ==
Journalists who got their start at the Amarillo Globe-News include National Journal correspondent Major Garrett, Dow Jones Newswires and columnist Al Lewis.
