= KSAH (AM) =

Radio station in Universal City, Texas

- Universal City, Texas; United States
- Broadcast area: San Antonio metropolitan area
- Frequency: 720 kHz
- Branding: Norteño 720 y 104.1

Programming
- Language: Spanish
- Format: Classic regional Mexican and norteño music

Ownership
- Owner: Connoisseur Media; (Alpha Media Licensee, LLC)
- Sister stations: KJXK; KLEY-FM; KSAH-FM; KTFM; KTSA; KZDC

History
- First air date: November 1, 1986; 39 years ago

Technical information
- Licensing authority: FCC
- Facility ID: 23072
- Class: B
- Power: 10,000 watts (day); 890 watts (night)
- Transmitter coordinates: 29°31′51.8″N 98°10′40″W
- Repeater: 104.1 KSAH-FM (Pearsall)

Links
- Public license information: Public file; LMS
- Website: www.nortenosa.com

KSAH (720 kHz) is a commercial AM radio station, licensed to Universal City, Texas, and serving the San Antonio metropolitan area. KSAH and sister station 104.1 KSAH-FM simulcast a classic regional Mexican radio format, specializing in norteño music. The two stations are owned by Connoisseur Media with the licenses held by Alpha Media Licensee, LLC. The studios and offices are located on Eisenhauer Road in Northeast San Antonio.

The AM station's transmitter site is south of Zuehl, Texas, off Stolte Road. By day, KSAH is powered at 10,000 watts. Because AM 720 is a clear channel frequency reserved for Class A station WGN in Chicago, KSAH must reduce power at night to 890 watts to avoid interference. The station uses a directional antenna around the clock.

== History ==
KSAH first signed on the air November 1, 1986. It was owned by Gandadores, Inc. and broadcast at 10,000 watts by day, 1,000 watts by night. It aired a Regional Mexican music format.

In 2010, the AM station's Regional Mexican format started to be simulcast on 104.1 KSAH-FM. In June 2012, the music format moved exclusively to 104.1 FM and the AM station switched to Spanish-language sports talk, as an ESPN Deportes Radio Network affiliate. In 2018, the sports format was discontinued and the two stations returned to simulcasting their programming. The FM station's transmitter is located about 30 miles south of San Antonio in Atascosa County, Texas, in the community of Hindes. Simulcasting helps listeners in other parts of the San Antonio market hear KSAH-FM's programming by tuning in AM 720.
