= KWRD (AM) =

Simulcasts KYYK, Palestine
- Henderson, Texas; United States
- Broadcast area: Longview-Marshall area
- Frequency: 1470 kHz
- Branding: E-Tex Radio Network

Programming
- Format: Classic country Texas Country
- Affiliations: E-Tex Radio Network; Dallas Cowboys

Ownership
- Owner: Tiffany, Kristi and Monte Spearman; (Zula Com, LLC)
- Sister stations: KNET; KYYK; KCKL

History
- First air date: August 3, 1956
- Call sign meaning: Wesley R. Dean (original majority owner)

Technical information
- Licensing authority: FCC
- Facility ID: 71519
- Class: D
- Power: 5,000 watts daytime 83 watts nighttime
- Transmitter coordinates: 32°10′55.00″N 94°47′49.00″W
- Translator: 98.5 K253CE (Henderson)
- Repeaters: 95.9 KCKL (Malakoff); 98.3 KYYK (Palestine)

Links
- Public license information: Public file; LMS
- Website: Official website

KWRD (1470 AM) is a terrestrial American radio station, relayed by an FM translator and simulcast with sister stations KCKL and KYYK, broadcasting a hybrid classic country format, with an emphasis on Texas Country artists. It also features programming from the E-Tex Radio Network and co-owned High Plains Radio Network. Licensed to Henderson, Texas, United States, the station serves the Henderson-Longview-Marshall area. The station is owned by Tiffany, Kristi, and Monte Spearman, through licensee Zula Com, LLC.

== History ==
KWRD was initially proposed by Wesley R. Dean, Wilton W. Freeman, and Lynn J. Roy in 1955. Requesting an application to construct a 500-watt daytime only facility under the name Wes Dean & Associates, a construction permit was granted by the Federal Communications Commission to build the facility, licensed to Henderson, Texas on November 23, 1955. Dean would purchase a complete turn-key RCA transmitter and studio facility for the station, which would be located at Texas State Highway 26 and Charles Street in Henderson. The single tower facility was built and granted a License to Cover on August 3, 1956. The station was assigned the callsign KWRD by request, with the call letters standing for the initials of Dean's name.

Wes Dean, who was a former local TV star at KTVE in Longview, Texas, went to Henderson in hopes of starting his own station, only to find that there was already one radio station in the city, KGRI AM 1000. KGRI was owned by country music star Jim Reeves.

Dean would end up owning the other Henderson licensed AM facility, 1000 KGRI, and FM facility 99.9 KGRI-FM during this time, having purchased both from Reeves' wife, Mary, and Reeves' partner Tom Perryman, after his death in 1964. Perryman and Jim's wife would go on to move to Murfreesboro, Tennessee and purchase WMTS-AM-FM.

The KGRI license was surrendered by the Dean family on May 31, 1985 in order to accommodate an out of state facility's upgrade on the same operating frequency. The former KGRI-FM facility is still licensed, now to Tatum and using the call sign KZQX.

Wes Dean & Associates, through his widow Helen Dean and son Chipper, would own KWRD until April 8, 1998, when it was sold to Witko Broadcasting.

Former Tyler City Councilman Jerry Russell sold the facility to Jerry and Wanda Hanszen, requesting a license transfer to Hanszen Broadcasting on July 27, 2012. The license transfer for KWRD was granted on September 7, 2012.

KWRD has maintained a Country format for most of its existence. Prior to the sale of KPXI, it broadcast sports programming, utilizing the national NBC Sports Radio format. After the sale, it returned to country, assuming the displaced classic country format of 100.7.

On January 3, 2023, a Transfer of Control was filed with the Federal Communications Commission to sell KWRD and its translator to Zula Com, LLC. Zula Com currently owns KYYK 98.3 FM and KNET 1450 AM/95.7 FM in Palestine, Texas, and is operated by the Spearman Family, owners of several radio stations around the State of Texas, as well as the High Plains Radio Network.

== KWRD-FM ==
After Wesley R. Dean's death his son Chipper took over operation of KWRD and KGRI-FM. In the mid-1980s the owners of 100.7 in Dallas were looking at building a Christian FM. They wanted the KWRD call letters so that it would stand for "The Word". Dean sold them the rights to the KWRD-FM side of the call letters, and used the money to buy KWRD a new transmitter. It was at this point that 1470 KWRD was raised to 5,000 watts, and got authorization to run 90 watts at night.

== Ownership changes ==
In the 1990s Chipper Dean lost interest in owning the stations and sold the AM to Witko Broadcasting (Dick Witkowsky). Dean sold KGRI-FM to Hunt Broadcasting of Colorado (Hunt wanted the station as they were moving 12 stations to move 2 into Dallas). The 99.9 was traded with KMOO in Mineola (as they were on 96.7 the frequency that the Hunts Sherman move-in was on). 99.9 was turned into 100.3 and the call letters changed to KXAL. Today KGRI-FM is 100.3 KZQX, a bigband, standards, mix station.

KWRD was owned by Witko for a short time and was sold to Jerry Russell of Kilgore. Russell also owned 690 KZEY Tyler, 1060 KOFY Gilmer and stations in several other small markets. During Russell's ownership the station went dark for over a year due to a burnt up plate transformer in the transmitter. While the station was off the air Russell entered into an LMA with an option to buy with Phillip Burr. Subsequently, KWRD was sold to Jerry T. Hanszen's Hanszen Broadcasting at a purchase price of $100,000. The purchase was consummated on August 5, 2012.

Under the Hanszen Family's operation of KWRD, 1470 once again turned it into a local family run station that is completely community focused.

On April 25, 2023, Tiffany, Kristi, and Monte Spearman, through licensee Zula Com, LLC, was granted a transfer of license for the station, and the associated FM translator, after purchasing the station from the Hanszen family. The purchase, at a price of $100,000, was consummated on May 18, 2023.

== Programming ==
KWRD carries The Bob Griffin Radio Show, broadcast from KEEL (AM) in Shreveport, Louisiana, a program of travel reports, features, area personalities, and uplifting human interest stories, often with Christian testimonies.
