= KYYK =

Radio station in Texas, US

Simulcasts KCKL, Malakoff
- Palestine, Texas; United States
- Broadcast area: Jacksonville-Tyler area
- Frequency: 98.3 MHz
- Branding: Kick 98.3

Programming
- Format: Country; Texas Country
- Affiliations: Dallas Cowboys; High Plains Radio Network

Ownership
- Owner: Tiffany Spearman and Kristi Spearman; (Zula Com, LLC)
- Sister stations: KNET; KWRD; KCKL

History
- First air date: November 18, 1981
- Former call signs: KYYK (1981–1987); KNET-FM (1987)
- Call sign meaning: "Kick" (branding)

Technical information
- Licensing authority: FCC
- Facility ID: 72838
- Class: C3
- ERP: 5,000 watts
- HAAT: 222.0 meters (728.3 ft)
- Transmitter coordinates: 31°55′33.00″N 95°38′48.00″W
- Repeaters: 95.9 KCKL (Malakoff); 1470/98.5 KWRD (Henderson)

Links
- Public license information: Public file; LMS
- Webcast: Listen live
- Website: Official website

KYYK (98.3 FM) is a radio station broadcasting a hybrid Classic country format, with an emphasis on Texas Country artists. Licensed to Palestine, Texas, United States, the station serves the Tyler-Jacksonville area. KYYK simulcasts programming with sister stations KCKL and KWRD under the umbrella of the "E-Tex Radio Network". The station is currently owned by Tiffany Spearman and Kristi Spearman, through licensee Zula Com, LLC, and is an affiliate of the High Plains Radio Network.

== History ==
The station was assigned the call sign KYYK on 1981-11-18. On 1987-07-01, the station changed its call sign to KNET-FM and on 1987-09-21, back to the current KYYK.

On April 6, 2022, KYYK shifted its playlist to mostly classic country and Texas/Red Dirt country.
