= KPTX =

Radio station in Pecos, Texas

- Pecos, Texas; United States
- Broadcast area: Odessa-Midland
- Frequency: 98.3 MHz
- Branding: 98X FM

Programming
- Format: Adult contemporary
- Affiliations: Citadel Broadcasting

Ownership
- Owner: Bill Randall Cole; (Pecos Radio Company, Inc.)

History
- First air date: August 3, 1981; 44 years ago
- Call sign meaning: Pecos, Texas

Technical information
- Licensing authority: FCC
- Facility ID: 51572
- Class: C3
- ERP: 9,500 watts
- HAAT: 129 meters (423 ft)
- Transmitter coordinates: 31°29′56.00″N 103°19′50.00″W

Links
- Public license information: Public file; LMS
- Webcast: Listen Live
- Website: 98xfm.com

KPTX (98.3 FM, "98X FM West Texas Best") is a radio station broadcasting an adult contemporary music format. Licensed to Pecos, Texas, United States, the station serves the Odessa-Midland area. The station is currently owned by Bill Randall Cole, through licensee Pecos Radio Company, Inc., and features programming from Citadel Broadcasting.
