= KGNC-FM =

Radio station in Amarillo, Texas

- Amarillo, Texas; United States
- Broadcast area: Amarillo metropolitan area
- Frequency: 97.9 MHz
- Branding: KGNC 97-9

Programming
- Format: Country
- Affiliations: Compass Media Networks

Ownership
- Owner: Connoisseur Media; (Alpha Media Licensee LLC)
- Sister stations: KGNC; KXGL; KVWE

History
- First air date: December 24, 1958
- Former call signs: KGNC-FM (1958–1988); KMLT (1988–1992)
- Call sign meaning: Globe-News Company

Technical information
- Licensing authority: FCC
- Facility ID: 63161
- Class: C
- ERP: 100,000 watts
- HAAT: 398 meters (1,306 ft)

Links
- Public license information: Public file; LMS
- Webcast: Listen live
- Website: kgncfm.com

KGNC-FM (97.9 FM) is a commercial radio station licensed to Amarillo, Texas, United States. It is the oldest FM station in the Amarillo region. KGNC-FM airs a country music format. The station is owned by Connoisseur Media. Studios for it and its partners are located in southwest Amarillo near the former Western Plaza shopping center.

KGNC-FM is one of the stations responsible for the activation of the Emergency Alert System in the Amarillo area.

== Programming ==
The station conducts an annual "Jude Country Cares Radiothon".

== History ==
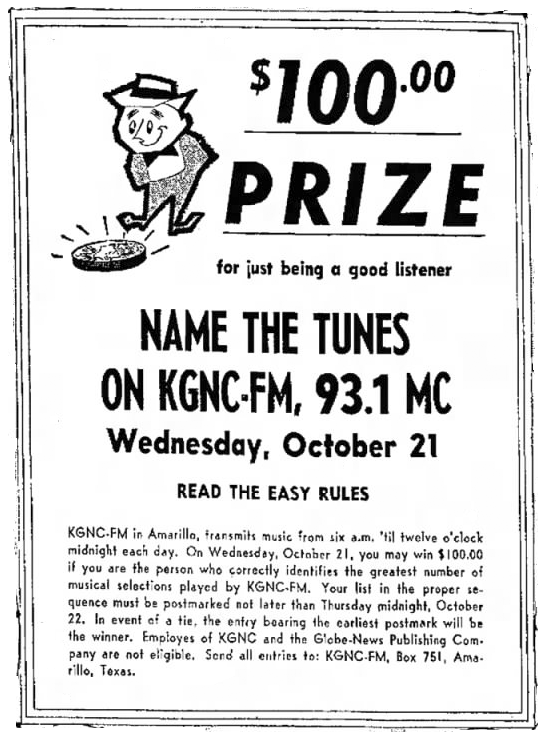
1959 advertisement for station contest.

The current KGNC-FM is the second station to hold that call sign. The first KGNC-FM, also located in Amarillo, debuted on November 25, 1947, at 104.3 MHz, as the first FM station broadcasting in the Texas panhandle. Licensed to the Plains Broadcasting Company, this station ceased operations in 1950.

On October 1, 1958, an application by Plains Broadcasting for a new FM station was granted, for operation with a power of 14.6 kilowatts and an HAAT (Height Above Average Terrain) of 441 feet (134 meters), transmitting on 93.1 MHz. The new station was assigned the call letters KGNC-FM.

KGNC-FM began broadcasting on December 24, 1958, initially simulcasting its AM sister station, KGNC. Its first day of broadcasting included an early example of stereo transmission, with the sending of a demonstration phonograph record's right-channel audio over KGNC-FM, and the left-channel audio over KGNC.

In 1960, the station began broadcasting programming that was separate from KGNC's.

On February 15, 1972, an application was granted to move to 97.9 MHz, with a maximum power of 45.5 kilowatts, and a HAAT of 1,285 feet (392 m).

The station's call letters were changed to KMLT on February 14, 1988, but then back to KGNC-FM on November 2, 1992.

In 1994 the Federal Communications Commission found the Equal Employment Opportunity policies of KGNC and KGNC-FM to be deficient. The stations were notified of a fine of an apparent liability of $25,000, and given shorter than usual license renewals.
