= KGNC (AM) =

Radio station in Amarillo, Texas

- Amarillo, Texas; United States
- Frequency: 710 kHz
- Branding: Newstalk 710 & 97.5 KGNC

Programming
- Format: Talk radio
- Affiliations: ABC News Radio; Fox News Radio; Compass Media Networks; Westwood One; Texas Rangers Radio Network; Dallas Cowboys Radio Network

Ownership
- Owner: Connoisseur Media; (Alpha Media Licensee LLC)
- Sister stations: KGNC-FM; KXGL; KVWE

History
- First air date: 1922
- Call sign meaning: Globe-News Company

Technical information
- Licensing authority: FCC
- Facility ID: 63159
- Class: B
- Power: 10,000 watts
- Transmitter coordinates: 35°25′11.2″N 101°33′25.6″W
- Translator: 97.5 K248DE (Amarillo)

Links
- Public license information: Public file; LMS
- Webcast: Listen live
- Website: kgncnewsnow.com

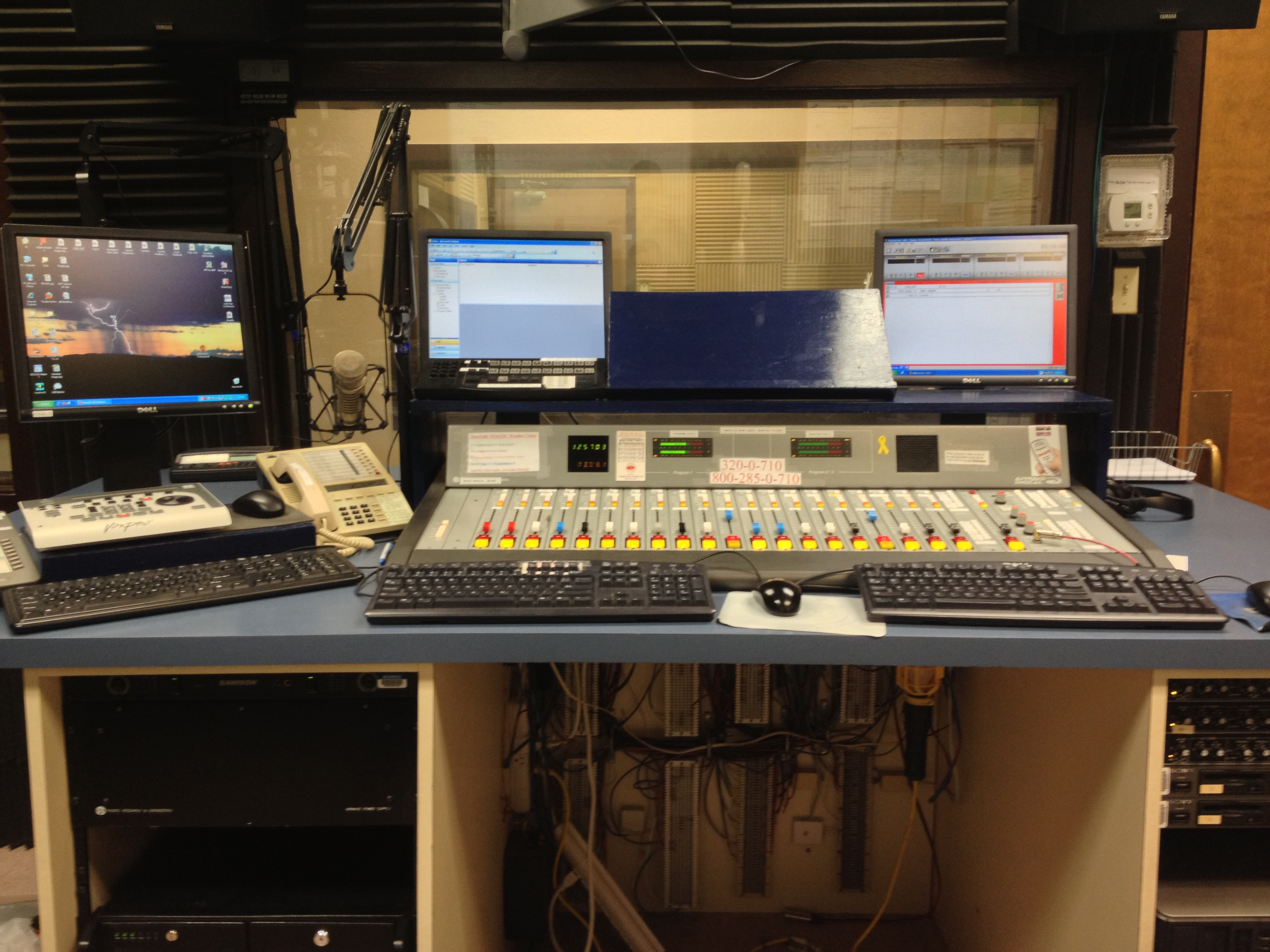
KGNC control board

KGNC (710 AM) is a commercial radio station licensed to Amarillo, Texas, United States, with a talk radio format. The station is owned by Connoisseur Media. Studios for KGNC and its partners are located in southwest Amarillo near the former Western Plaza shopping center. KGNC's programming is also broadcast on 97.5 FM by translator K248DE in Amarillo.

KGNC's transmitter site is located north of Amarillo in an unincorporated section of Potter County, and northeast of Amarillo in Carson County. KGNC operates fulltime with 10,000 watts, using different daytime and nighttime directional antennas. The station has a relatively large coverage area, due to its fairly high power and the surrounding area's good ground conductivity. The signal provides at least secondary coverage of large portions of Texas, Oklahoma, Kansas and New Mexico, including such cities as Lubbock and Abilene, Texas, Clovis and Roswell, New Mexico, and Garden City, Kansas. KGNC's signal has been received during the day in the suburbs of Dallas and Oklahoma City. At night, the station has a more restrictive directional antenna, that sends most of its signal north and south, and can sometimes be heard as far west as Tucson, Arizona. KGNC's transmitting frequency of 710 AM is a United States clear-channel frequency, on which WOR in New York City and KIRO in Seattle, share Class A status. Other stations, including KGNC, on this frequency must protect the nighttime skywave signals of the Class A stations, with reduced power and/or directional signals.

KGNC is one of the stations responsible for the activation of the Emergency Alert System in the Amarillo area.

== History ==
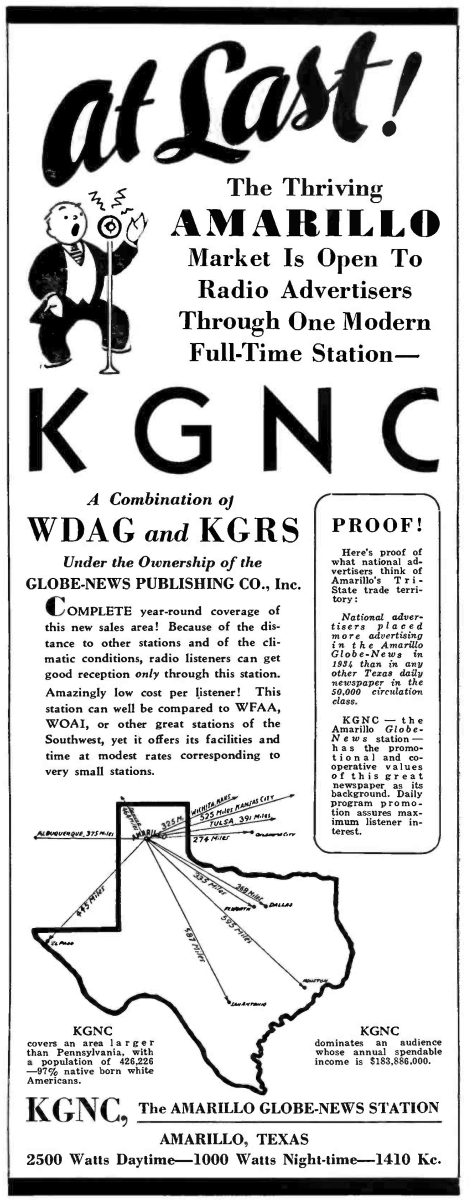
KGNC originated as a June 1935 consolidation of existing stations WDAG and KGRS.

KGNC was formed in 1935, when the Amarillo Globe-News Publishing Company purchased and consolidated two existing stations, WDAG and KGRS.

Effective December 1, 1921, the Commerce Department, which regulated radio at this time, adopted regulations formally defining "broadcasting stations". The wavelength of 360 meters (833 kHz) was designated for entertainment broadcasts, while 485 meters (619 kHz) was reserved for broadcasting official weather and other government reports. Because there was only one available "entertainment" wavelength, stations in a given region had to develop timesharing agreements, to assign exclusive timeslots for broadcasting on 360 meters.

Initially call letters beginning with "W" were generally assigned to stations east of an irregular line formed by the western state borders from North Dakota south to Texas, with calls beginning with "K" going only to stations in states west of that line. In January 1923 the Mississippi River was established as the new boundary, thus after this date Texas stations generally received call letters starting with "K" instead of "W".

=== WDAG ===
Amarillo's first broadcasting station was WDAG, licensed to J. Laurance Martin at 605 East Fourth Street on May 16, 1922, for operation on 360 meters. The call letters were randomly assigned from a sequential roster of available call signs.

In the late summer of 1923, WDAG was reassigned to 1140 kHz. In 1930, the owner became the National Radio and Broadcasting Company.

=== WQAC/KGRS ===
WQAC was first licensed to E. B. Gish on December 28, 1922, for operation on 360 meters. Gish owned the Gish Radio Service at 108 East Eighth Street in Amarillo. Like WDAG, the WQAC call letters were randomly assigned, and came from the same sequential roster of available call letters.

WQAC moved to 1280 kHz in early 1924. The station was reported deleted in late 1925, but then quickly relicensed, still on 1280 kHz. In late 1926 the call letters were changed from WQAC to KGRS, with the new call sign based on the initials of Gish Radio Service. On June 15, 1927, KGRS was assigned to 1230 kHz.

=== Consolidation of WDAG and KGRS as KGNC ===
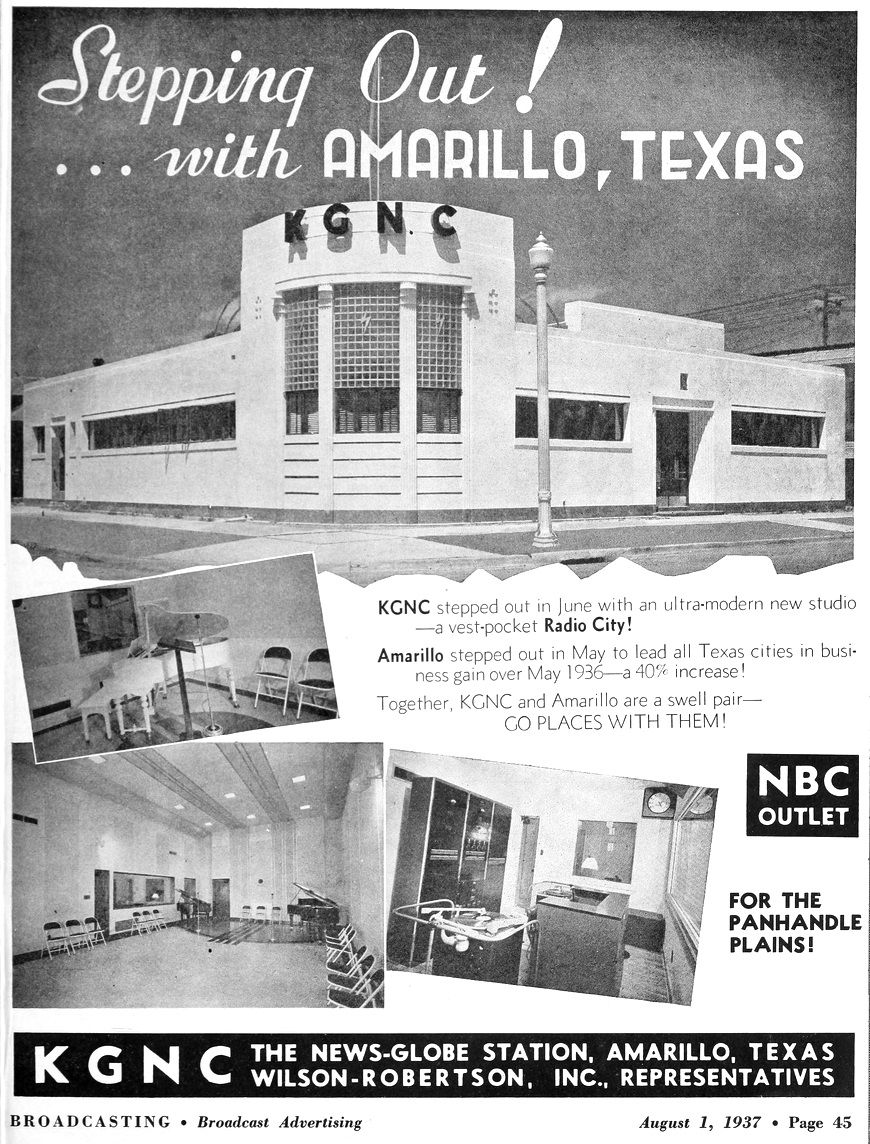
In June 1937, KGNC moved into an "ultra-modern new studio".

Effective November 11, 1928, with the implementation of the Federal Radio Commission's General Order 40, both WDAG and KGRS were moved to 1410 kHz, on a timesharing basis.

As of 1935, WDAG and KGRS were still the only radio stations located in Amarillo. At this time the Globe-News Company, Inc., a local newspaper publisher, formed the Plains Radio Broadcasting Company to take over and consolidate the two stations. The licenses of both WDAG and KGRS were acquired and assigned to Plains Radio Broadcasting. KGRS was treated as the dominant station of the merger, and its call sign was changed to KGNC. Starting on June 1, 1935, the combined operation began broadcasting fulltime under the KGNC call letters. After Federal Communications Commission (FCC) approval of the merger, KGNC operated with 2,500 watts daytime, and 1,000 watts at night.

=== Later history ===
On March 29, 1941, stations on 1410 kHz, including KGNC, were moved to 1440 kHz, as part of the implementation of the North American Regional Broadcasting Agreement.

In 1947 KGNC moved to its current frequency assignment of 710 kHz. Another Amarillo station, KFDA, took advantage of the vacated frequency to move from 1230 to 1440 kHz.

In 1953 television station KGNC-TV began operations. An FM station, the first in the Texas panhandle, went on the air in November 1947, but suspended operations in 1950. In December 1958 a second affiliated FM station, which like the first had the call sign KGNC-FM, began broadcasting.

In 1994, the Federal Communications Commission found the Equal Employment Opportunity policies of KGNC and KGNC-FM to be deficient. The stations were notified of a fine of an apparent liability of $25,000, and given shorter than usual license renewals.

Previous logo

== Translator ==
| Call sign | Frequency | City of license | FID | ERP (W) | HAAT | Class | FCC info |
|---|---|---|---|---|---|---|---|
| K248DE | (97.5 MHz) FM | Amarillo, Texas | 147975 | 250 | 157 m (515 ft) | D | LMS |

== See also ==
- List of initial AM-band station grants in the United States
