= KLEY-FM =

Radio station in Jourdanton, Texas

Jourdanton, Texas; United States
- Broadcast area: Greater San Antonio
- Frequency: 95.7 MHz
- Branding: Tejano 95.7

Programming
- Languages: Spanish and English
- Format: Tejano

Ownership
- Owner: Connoisseur Media; (Alpha Media Licensee, LLC)
- Sister stations: KJXK; KSAH; KSAH-FM; KTFM; KTSA; KZDC

History
- First air date: 2001 (as KBUC)
- Former call signs: KBOP-FM (1998–2000; CP); KBUC (2000–2005)
- Call sign meaning: La Ley (previous format)

Technical information
- Licensing authority: FCC
- Facility ID: 55414
- Class: C2
- ERP: 11,000 watts
- HAAT: 316 meters (1,037 ft)
- Transmitter coordinates: 28°54′58.3″N 98°39′40.1″W
- Repeater: 94.1 KTFM-HD3 (Floresville)

Links
- Public license information: Public file; LMS
- Webcast: Listen live
- Website: tejano957.com

KLEY-FM (95.7 MHz, "Tejano 95.7") is a commercial radio station licensed to Jourdanton, Texas, and serving the San Antonio metropolitan area. The station is currently owned by Connoisseur Media and licensed to Alpha Media Licensee, LLC. KLEY-FM broadcasts a Tejano music format. The studios are on Eisenhauer Road in Northeast San Antonio.

KLEY-FM has an effective radiated power (ERP) of 11,000 watts. The transmitter site is on Route 300 near Farm-to-Market Road in Charlotte, Texas.

== History ==
Before the station was built, the construction permit was given the call sign KBOP-FM on April 6, 1998. On October 2, 2000, it changed its call sign to KBUC. KBUC signed on in 2001.

On February 2, 2005, the call letters were switched to KLEY-FM.

On May 6, 2019, sister station 103.1 KHHL in Karnes City dropped its ESPN Deportes Radio programming to simulcast KLEY-FM.

On February 23, 2022, at 11 a.m., KLEY-FM flipped from Regional Mexican as "La Ley 95.7" to Tejano as "Tejano 95.7". On June 9, 2022, KLEY-FM started simulcasting on the third HD Radio channel of 94.1 KTFM-HD3 and on translator station K227CX (103.3 FM).
