= KOFY (AM) =

- Gilmer, Texas; United States
- Broadcast area: Tyler, Texas
- Frequency: 1060 kHz

Programming
- Language: Spanish

Ownership
- Owner: Jerry Russell D/B/A the Russell Company

History
- First air date: 1973
- Last air date: February 29, 2012
- Former call signs: KHYM (1971–1990); KTLG (1990); KHYM (1990–1996); KBNB (1996–1999); KOFY (1999–2012)

Technical information
- Facility ID: 34558
- Power: 10,000 watts (daytime only)
- Transmitter coordinates: 32°43′51.5″N 95°2′35.8″W

KOFY (1060 kHz) was a daytime-only AM medium wave radio station in Gilmer, Texas, United States. It first aired in 1973, and formerly used the call signs KBNB, KHYM, and KTLG until becoming KOFY in 1999. It was deleted in 2012.

The Federal Communications Commission cancelled the station’s license on February 29, 2012.
