= KVWE (FM) =

Radio station in Amarillo, Texas

- Amarillo, Texas; United States
- Broadcast area: Amarillo metropolitan area
- Frequency: 102.9 MHz (HD Radio)
- Branding: 102.9 The Rattler

Programming
- Format: Classic rock

Ownership
- Owner: Connoisseur Media; (Alpha Media Licensee LLC)
- Sister stations: KXGL; KGNC-FM; KGNC

History
- First air date: October 6, 1986 (as KRGN at 103.1)
- Former call signs: KRGN (1986–2014); KEYU-FM (2014–2019)
- Former frequencies: 103.1 MHz (1986–2014)
- Call sign meaning: "We" (former branding and format)

Technical information
- Licensing authority: FCC
- Facility ID: 39892
- Class: C1
- ERP: 100,000 watts
- HAAT: 89 meters (292 ft)
- Transmitter coordinates: 35°15′41.2″N 101°52′53.7″W

Links
- Public license information: Public file; LMS
- Webcast: Listen live
- Website: www.1029therattler.com

KVWE (102.9 MHz) is an FM radio station broadcasting a classic rock format. Licensed to Amarillo, Texas, United States, it serves the Amarillo area. The station is owned by Connoisseur Media. Its studios are located on Olsen Boulevard near Western Avenue in southwest Amarillo, and its transmitter is located near Farm to Market Road 1719 and Loop 335 in northwest Amarillo.

== History ==
Originally KRGN-FM, it was sold by Family Life Radio to Midessa Broadcasting for $700,000. Then renamed to KEYU-FM, it was previously owned by Drewry Communications. On August 10, 2015, Raycom Media announced that it would purchase Drewry Communications for $160 million. The deal was completed on December 1, 2015. KEYU-FM, along with KTXC in Lamesa were Raycom's only radio stations since the company sold WMC AM-FM in Memphis, Tennessee, to Infinity Broadcasting Corporation in 2000; in January 2019, Raycom would merge with Gray Television, who would immediately begin the process of selling the station as they had no intention of joining the radio business.

On May 16, 2019, Gray Television agreed to sell KEYU-FM to Alpha Media for $250,000. On July 11, 2019, Alpha took over control and flipped the station from Spanish adult hits (as "Mundo FM") to an English-language rhythmic CHR format as "WE 102.9", and changed the call letters to KVWE.

On August 11, 2022, Alpha announced they would flip KVWE to sports talk under their statewide "The Sports Star" brand on August 15, affiliating just as the other "Star" stations with ESPN Radio.

Alpha Media merged with Connoisseur Media on September 4, 2025. On September 29, 2025, at 6 a.m., in the first major move performed by Connoisseur after they officially took control of the Alpha stations, KVWE flipped to classic rock, branded as "102.9 The Rattler"; the first song under the format was "Welcome to the Jungle" by Guns N' Roses. The station launched with the emphasizing of Texas-born artists being carried by the format, with ZZ Top and The Fabulous Thunderbirds amongst the Texas native bands emphasized.
