= Texas State Network =

State radio network in Texas

- Type: Radio network
- Country: United States

Ownership
- Owner: Texas State Networks

History
- Launch date: 1938

Coverage
- Availability: In Texas through its radio affiliates

Links
- Website: tsnradio.com

The Texas State Network was the largest of the 30 state radio networks in the United States. TSN mainly distributed news and agriculture business to more than 130 AM and FM radio affiliates across Texas.

== History ==
The Texas State Network was founded in 1938 by presidential son Elliott Roosevelt, who was loaned money by the oil magnate Sid Richardson to eventually buy a dozen stations (many are still affiliates) that formed the Texas State Network.

TSN began transmitting five weeks after its incorporation date, with a broadcast originating from the old Casa Mañana in Fort Worth, and featured such personalities as Bob Hope and Texas Governor James V. Allred, along with a 300-voice choir.

The network’s original programming included soap operas such as Uncle Jeremiah and The Adventures of Gary and Jill. As is the case today, most of TSN's early programming was devoted to news and sports. Nearly 30 network announcers, production personnel and control room operators produced Highlights in the World News daily.

The first baseball broadcasts on TSN were of the Fort Worth Cats, with announcer Zack Hurt, calling the play-by-play.

At the time of its closure, the focus of TSN is news, sports, business, weather, agriculture and talk programming to 130 affiliated radio stations in Texas, including the network’s flagship station KRLD which is located at the same facility. Seven affiliates that carried TSN's premiere broadcast are still carrying the network’s programming.

== Studios ==
TSN studios have moved around over the years. It began at 1308 Lancaster in Fort Worth. It moved in the mid-1950s to 4801 West Freeway (same as KFJZ AM/-TV/later -FM). TSN was sold to Metromedia and moved to 8585 Stemmons Freeway in Dallas. Later sites included periods where the network broadcast from facilities on John W. Carpenter Freeway in Dallas and at Rangers Ballpark in Arlington, Texas. In summer 2005, the station moved to a fifth floor office at the southwest corner of Fitzhugh and Central Expressway, in Dallas. In December of 2025, TSN moved to The Audacy Broadcast center at 12377 Merit Drive Suite 1600 in Dallas

== Today ==
Audacy, the owner of KRLD, announced the cessation of all news, talk, weather and agriculture programming on the network in November 2026.

The tradition of sports broadcasts continues into the present as the network is also known as the distribution center for NFL franchises, The Dallas Cowboys Radio Network and the Houston Texans Network In addition is the distribution link for The University of Texas Longhorns Radio Network.

== Services ==
• TSN Texas News • Hourly statewide newscasts • Breaking-news coverage and special reports • Texas in the Morning with Kristin Yates • Business and consumer updates

• Weather • Statewide and regional forecasts • Severe-weather coverage

• Agriculture • Texas agriculture news and market information • Shoot the Bull with TSN Agriculture Director Chelsea Wade • Reports featuring the Texas Department of Agriculture

• Professional Sports short form reports • Dallas Cowboys reports with Brad Sham • Houston Texans reports • Texas Rangers reports • Houston Astros reports

• College Sports • Game Day with Jeff Ward—a weekly college football preview • The University of Texas Longhorns - Play-by-play broadcasts and special-event uplinks

• Texas High School Football • Countdown to Kickoff • Halftime Spotlight • Post Game • Regional Scoreboard Show • Friday Night Wrap-Up

• Lifestyle and Storytelling • A Story Found Along the Way with Bob Phillips • Own the Road with Bob & Kelli Phillips

• Weekend and Specialty Programming

Texas Fishing and Outdoors • Hosted by Brian Hughes • Saturday: 5:00–7:00 a.m. Central -and Sunday: 5:00–6:00 a.m. Central

• Neil Sperry’s Texas Lawn and Garden Hour • Hosted by renowned Texas horticulturist Neil Sperry • Live Saturdays from 11:00 a.m.–Noon Central

• Plant Talk Texas • Also hosted by Neil Sperry • A five-minute weekday feature

• Affiliate Services • Flexible program scheduling • Full-length programs and individual segments • Commercial inventory and local-revenue opportunities • Program delivery through TruCast Pro • Technical, promotional and affiliate-relations support
