= List of Dallas Cowboys broadcasters =

As of 2018, the Dallas Cowboys' flagship radio station is KRLD-FM owned by Audacy.

Brad Sham is the team's longtime play-by-play voice. Working alongside him is former Cowboy quarterback Babe Laufenberg. The Cowboys, who retain rights to all announcers, chose not to renew Laufenberg's contract in 2006 and brought in former safety Charlie Waters. However, Laufenberg did work as the analyst on the "Blue Star Network," which televises Cowboys preseason games not shown on national networks. The anchor station is KTVT, the CBS owned and operated station in Dallas. Previous stations which aired Cowboys games included KTCK (AM), KVIL-FM, KRLD, and KLUV. Kristi Scales is the sideline reporter on the radio broadcasts.

During his tenure as Cowboys coach, Tom Landry co-hosted his own coach's show with late veteran sportscaster Frank Glieber and later with Brad Sham. Landry's show was famous for his analysis of raw game footage and for him and his co-host making their NFL "predictions" at the end of each show. Glieber is one of the original voices of the Cowboys Radio Network, along with Bill Mercer, famous for calling the Ice Bowl of 1967 and both Super Bowl V and VI. Mercer is perhaps best known as the ringside commentator of World Class Championship Wrestling in the 1980s. Upon Mercer's departure, Verne Lundquist joined the network, and became their play-by-play announcer by 1977, serving eight years in that capacity before handing those chores permanently over to Brad Sham, who joined the network in 1977 as the color analyst and occasional fill-in for Lundquist.

Longtime WFAA-TV sports anchor Dale Hansen was the Cowboys' color analyst with Brad Sham as the play-by-play announcer from 1985-94. Dave Garrett succeeded Sham on play-by-play in 1995, teaming with Hansen (1995–96), Laufenberg (1996–97), and Mike Doocy (1997). Sham returned as the team's play-by-play voice in 1998.

In 1984 and 2001, the Cowboys used guest analysts in the radio booth for each game. In 1984, Dale Hansen, Charlie Waters, Roger Staubach, Cliff Harris, Verne Lundquist, Drew Pearson, Frank Glieber, and Bob Lilly were guest analysts. In 2001, guest analysts included Charlie Waters, Irving Fryar, Roger Staubach, Troy Aikman, Dan Rather, Michael Irvin, Preston Pearson, John Madden, Pat Summerall, and Dale Hansen.

== Cowboys radio announcers ==
Years	Flagship station	Play-by-play	Color commentator
1960	KBOX	Bud Sherman	Frank Glieber
1961	KBOX	Frank Glieber	Don Buehler
1962	KLIF	Charles Boland	Bill Meek
1963	KLIF/KVIL	Rick Weaver	Gary DeLaune
1964	KLIF	Jay Randolph	Gary DeLaune
1965	KLIF	Jay Randolph	Bill Mercer
1966	KLIF	Bill Mercer	
1967–1968	KLIF	Bill Mercer	Blackie Sherrod
1969	KLIF	Bill Mercer	Blackie Sherrod & Verne Lundquist
1970–1971	KLIF	Bill Mercer	Verne Lundquist
1972–1975	KRLD	Verne Lundquist	Al Wisk
1976	KRLD	Verne Lundquist	Bob Lilly (home games) & Chris Needham (1st half of season) or Brad Sham (2nd half of season)
1977	KRLD	Verne Lundquist	Brad Sham
1978	KRLD	Frank Glieber	Verne Lundquist & Brad Sham
1979	KRLD	Frank Glieber	Charlie Waters (home games), Verne Lundquist & Brad Sham
1980–1983	KRLD	Verne Lundquist	Brad Sham
1984	KRLD	Brad Sham	Guest Analysts
1985–1990	KRLD	Brad Sham	Dale Hansen
1991–1994	KVIL	Brad Sham	Dale Hansen
1995	KVIL	Dave Garrett	Dale Hansen
1996	KVIL	Dave Garrett	Dale Hansen (first 14 games) or Babe Laufenberg (final 2 games)
1997	KVIL	Dave Garrett	Babe Laufenberg & Mike Doocy
1998–2000	KVIL	Brad Sham	Babe Laufenberg
2001	KVIL	Brad Sham	Babe Laufenberg & Guest Analysts
2002–2005	KLUV	Brad Sham	Babe Laufenberg
2006	KTCK/KDBN	Brad Sham	Charlie Waters
2007–2008	KTCK/KDBN	Brad Sham	Babe Laufenberg
2009–Present	KRLD-FM	Brad Sham	Babe Laufenberg
