= San Antonio shooting =

San Antonio shooting may refer to:

- 1979 San Antonio parade shooting, which occurred at the Battle of Flowers parade
- Sam Houston High School shooting, a 1990 school shooting at Sam Houston High School
- Shooting of Benjamin Marconi, a 2016 shooting of a detective with the San Antonio Police Department
- Rolling Oaks Mall shooting, a 2017 shooting at Rolling Oaks Mall
- 2023 Central Texas shootings, some of which took place in the San Antonio area

== See also ==
- List of shootings in Texas
