= KDFW =

Television station in Dallas

- Dallas–Fort Worth, Texas; United States
- City: Dallas, Texas
- Channels: Digital: 35 (UHF); Virtual: 4
- Branding: Fox 4

Programming
- Affiliations: 4.1: Fox; 4.2: Independent with MyNetworkTV in SD; for others, see § Subchannels

Ownership
- Owner: Fox Television Stations; (NW Communications of Texas, Inc.)
- Sister stations: KDFI

History
- First air date: December 3, 1949
- Former call signs: KRLD-TV (1949–1970); KDFW-TV (1970–1998)
- Former channel number: Analog: 4 (VHF, 1949–2009)
- Former affiliations: CBS (1949–1995)
- Call sign meaning: Dallas–Fort Worth; also ICAO code for Dallas Fort Worth International Airport

Technical information
- Licensing authority: FCC
- Facility ID: 33770
- ERP: 1,000 kW
- HAAT: 510 m (1,673 ft)
- Transmitter coordinates: 32°35′7.2″N 96°58′42.1″W
- Translator(s): KDFI 27.4 Dallas

Links
- Public license information: Public file; LMS
- Website: www.fox4news.com

KDFW (channel 4) is a television station licensed to Dallas, Texas, United States, serving the Dallas–Fort Worth metroplex. It is owned and operated by the Fox network through its Fox Television Stations division alongside KDFI (channel 27), an independent station with MyNetworkTV. The two stations share studios on North Griffin Street in downtown Dallas; KDFW's transmitter is located in Cedar Hill, Texas.

== History ==
=== As a CBS affiliate ===
==== Times-Herald ownership ====
On August 20, 1945, the KRLD Radio Corp.—a subsidiary of the now-defunct Dallas Times Herald newspaper, which was headed at the time by Times Herald Printing Co. president Tom C. Gooch—filed an application with the Federal Communications Commission (FCC) for a license and construction permit to operate a commercial television station on VHF channel 2 in Dallas. On August 22, 1946, one year and two days after it filed for the broadcast license, KRLD Radio Corp. amended its application to instead seek assignment on VHF channel 4. (The VHF channel 2 allocation was later reassigned to Denton as part of the FCC's "Sixth Report and Order" in November 1951; it would eventually be assigned to North Texas Public Broadcasting, which signed on KDTN—now a Daystar owned-and-operated station—over that allocation on September 1, 1988.) The FCC Broadcast Bureau granted the license to the Times Herald on September 13, 1946.

The newspaper chose to assign KRLD-TV for use as the television station's call letters; the base KRLD callsign had been used by the Times Herald-owned radio station on 1080 AM—a combined reference to both Edwin J. Kiest, an original investor and one-time owner of the Times Herald, and KRLD (AM), and the radio station's founding owner, Radio Laboratories of Dallas (which changed its name from Dallas Radio Laboratories as it sought the radio permit upon discovering that the KDRL calls had already been assigned for maritime use)—since it signed on its original 1040 AM frequency in October 1926, and applied to its FM sister on 92.5 (now KZPS) upon its March 1948 sign-on.

The station began test broadcasts on November 21, 1949. Channel 4 officially signed on the air, as KRLD-TV, two weeks later on December 3, 1949, at 12:30 p.m., with a short inaugural program featuring speeches from Gooch and KRLD-AM-TV managing director Clyde Rembert dedicating the station's launch, followed by a broadcast of the CBS game show It Pays to Be Ignorant. The first local program aired on the station that day was a college football game in which the Notre Dame Fighting Irish defeated the Southern Methodist Mustangs, 27–20. (The station was originally scheduled to debut on October 1, later pushed back to November 15.) KRLD-TV was the third television station to sign on in the Dallas–Fort Worth metroplex, following Dallas-based KBTV (channel 8, now WFAA) and Fort Worth-licensed WBAP-TV (channel 5, now KXAS-TV), all signing on within a 15-month timeframe. It was also the fourth Texas-based television station to be granted a license by the FCC (along with WBAP-TV, KBTV and Houston's KLEE-TV [now KPRC-TV]).

Channel 4 originally carried programming from CBS, an affiliation that KRLD-TV inherited through the CBS Radio Network's longtime relationship with KRLD (AM), which became the first radio station in Texas to affiliate with the television network's radio predecessor in 1927 (when the station was transmitting at 1040 AM); it was the first Metroplex-area television station to have maintained a singular network affiliation from its sign-on. The station originally broadcast for 4½ hours each weekday (from 7:30 a.m. to noon) and for four hours per day (from noon to 5 p.m.) on Saturdays and Saturdays. Among the local programs on channel 4 in its early years included O.Kay! Mr. Munn (hosted by an artist drawing visual interpretations of various song lyrics, predating the advent of the music video) and Confessions (a series featuring interviews with incarcerated criminals from the Dallas County Jail revealing why they committed the crimes they were convicted of).

The station initially operated from studio facilities located inside the Adolphus Hotel (between Commerce and Main Streets, north of the Times Herald Building) in downtown Dallas. The building—which also housed KRLD radio's facilities at the time—was used on a temporary basis until a permanent broadcast facility then under construction within the Times Herald's Herald Square building (at 1101 Patterson Street, which has since been demolished and converted into a parking lot) was completed. The tower that transmitted its signal (supporting microwave and remote antennas) was also based on the studio grounds. The station's 586-foot (179 m) transmission tower was located on Griffin Street and San Jacinto Avenue; at the time it was incorrectly designated as the tallest free-standing television transmission tower in the world. While it was among the tallest, taller TV towers had already been erected in Columbus, Ohio; Buffalo, New York; and St. Paul, Minnesota. Nonetheless, the tower provided a signal that spanned approximately 90 miles (145 km) from the site. By 1954, KRLD-TV expanded its broadcast day to an 18-hour daily schedule (running from 6 a.m. to midnight). In May 1955, the station began construction of a new 1,521-foot (464 m)-tall tower in Cedar Hill. At the time of its completion in October 1955, the structure was considered to be the tallest television broadcast tower in the world (once KRLD-TV moved its transmitter to the Cedar Hill tower in early 1956, the original Griffin Street transmitter remained in use as an auxiliary facility until it was disassembled in 1984; the antenna on which it was installed was torn down in 1995, to reduce the load on the tower).

KRLD-TV served as the home base for CBS' network coverage of the assassination of President John F. Kennedy on November 22, 1963, when suspect Lee Harvey Oswald (from an upper-floor window at the Texas School Book Depository) shot his rifle at sniper range at the Presidential motorcade carrying Kennedy and Texas Governor John Connally as it had turned onto Elm Street. Eddie Barker, who was KRLD-TV's news director at the time and had been with the station since it signed on fourteen years earlier as one of the original members of its news department staff, was the first person to announce Kennedy's death on television, relaying a message from an official at Parkland Hospital that Kennedy had succumbed from the gunshot wound as doctors conducted emergency surgery. Because of a local press pool arrangement that was put in place that morning to cover Kennedy's speech at the Trade Mart downtown, Barker's scoop appeared live simultaneously on CBS, which had sent correspondent Dan Rather to report from Dealey Plaza, and ABC. Two days later, a KRLD-TV field crew captured footage of Oswald's assassination by nightclub owner Jack Ruby as officers were transferring the former in handcuffs out of the Dallas Police Department's downtown precinct.

Studio/office facilities of KDFW (and sister station KDFI) on North Griffin Street in downtown Dallas.

CBS also maintained an arrangement with Channel 4 to use the station's remote unit to transmit live programming broadcast by the network during the 1960s and 1970s; in particular, the remote transmission truck was used to relay color broadcasts of CBS' NFL and college football game telecasts held in Texas. In 1964, KRLD-TV moved its operations from the Times Herald's Patterson Street offices into the station's current, purpose-built studio facility at 400 North Griffin Street (across the street from the former building, at the intersection of Griffin and San Jacinto). In 1968, the station's Cedar Hill transmitter site was struck by a helicopter, causing substantial damage to the tower.

==== Times Mirror and Argyle ownership ====
On September 22, 1969, the Los Angeles–based Times Mirror Company announced it would purchase the Times Herald and the KRLD radio and television from the Times Herald Printing Co. for $91 million in cash and stock. Although recently implemented FCC cross-ownership rules prohibited media companies from owning newspapers and full-power broadcast television and radio outlets in the same market, Times Mirror received approval to maintain the existing combination of the Times Herald and KRLD-TV under a cross-ownership waiver. However, to comply with FCC rules of the time that prohibited a single company from owning full-power broadcast television and radio outlets in the same market, Times Mirror sold KRLD-AM-FM to KRLD Corp. (owned principally by Philip R. Jonsson, Kenneth A. Jonsson and George V. Charlton, the sons and daughter of Dallas mayor and former Texas Instruments chairman J. Erik Jonsson) for $6.75 million. The transaction was approved by the FCC on May 15, 1970, and was finalized 1½ months later on July 1. The purchase marked Times Mirror's re-entry into broadcasting (it owned KTTV in Los Angeles, a present-day sister station of KDFW, from its sign-on in 1949 until 1963, when it sold that station to Metromedia for $10.5 million in cash and promissory notes), resulting in the creation of Times Mirror Broadcasting.

To comply with an FCC rule in effect at the time that prohibited separately owned radio and television stations in the same market from sharing the same base call letters, as KRLD Corp. was allowed to keep the KRLD call letters for its new radio properties, the station's call letters were changed to KDFW-TV—in partial reference to its service area of Dallas and Fort Worth—on July 2. (The "-TV" suffix was dropped from the KDFW callsign in July 1998; the KRLD-TV calls were later used by present-day CW affiliate KDAF [channel 33] from 1984 to 1986, when Metromedia co-owned that station and KRLD radio, the latter of which was also co-owned with present-day CBS owned-and-operated station KTVT [channel 11] from 1999 until CBS Corporation sold its radio division to Entercom in 2017.) In June 1986, the Times Mirror Company sold the Times Herald to Woodbury, New Jersey–based MediaNews Group for $110 million in cash and notes; Times Mirror retained ownership of KDFW, leaving the station as its sole remaining media property in the Metroplex. (The newspaper would cease publication five years later in December 1991, after it was purchased by the A.H. Belo Corporation, owners of rival newspaper The Dallas Morning News, for $55 million.)

A helicopter-tower collision similar to the one that occurred 19 years earlier happened on January 14, 1987, when KDFW's Cedar Hill broadcast tower (which was jointly owned by KDFW and WFAA, via the Hill Tower, Inc. consortium involving their respective corporate parents) was hit by a Navy F-4 Phantom that was performing training exercises as it was on approach to the Dallas Naval Air Station, clipping several guy-wires. The jet's two occupants survived as they had ejected themselves from the aircraft and parachuted to the ground before it crashed. (KDFW, KXAS and WFAA did not have their transmissions affected by the accident, although radio stations KZEW [97.9 FM, now KBFB] and KSCS [96.3 FM] were knocked off the air and temporarily broadcast at reduced power from another tower as a result.) In 1989, KDFW relocated its transmitter onto a new 1,400-foot (427 m)-tall tower constructed at the junction of Belt Line and Mansfield Roads in Cedar Hill, 1/4 mile (0.40 km) to the southwest. (The former tower—which had its height reduced to 1,240 feet [378 m] due to the removal of the candelabra mast that encompassed the upper 281 feet [86 m] of the structure—was converted into an auxiliary transmitter facility for KDFW, WFAA and radio stations KJMZ [100.3 FM, now KJKK], KMEZ [107.5 FM, now KMVK], KQZY [105.3 FM, now KRLD-FM], KKDA-FM [104.5] and KMGC [102.9 FM, now KDMX].)

In a move by the company to concentrate on its newspapers and cable television system franchises, on March 29, 1993, Times-Mirror announced it would sell KDFW-TV and its three sister stations—fellow CBS affiliate KTBC (now a Fox owned-and-operated station) in Austin, ABC affiliate KTVI (now a Fox affiliate) in St. Louis and NBC affiliate WVTM-TV in Birmingham—to San Antonio–based Argyle Television Holdings for $335 million in cash and securities. Under the transaction's two-part purchase option structure, Argyle acquired WVTM and KTVI from Times Mirror in an initial transactional (for $45 million and $35 million, respectively), and subsequently acquired KDFW and KTBC in a secondary transaction following FCC approval of their license renewals. The purchase of KDFW and KTBC was finalized on January 3, 1994.

In February 1994, Argyle Television took over management responsibilities for struggling independent station KDFI (channel 27, now a MyNetworkTV owned-and-operated station) under a local marketing agreement with its then-owner, Richardson-based Dallas Media Investors Corporation. The agreement—which resulted in KDFI integrating its operations into KDFW's downtown studios on North Griffin Street—allowed KDFW to provide advertising, promotional and master control services for KDFI, while Dallas Media Investors (which was owned by former KDFW station manager John McKay) would retain responsibilities over channel 27's programming and production services. Through the consolidation of that station's operations with Channel 4, KDFI began airing late-night rebroadcasts of KDFW's 10 p.m. newscast each weeknight as well as select syndicated programs seen on that station; during the first months of the LMA, KDFW also produced a daily 30-minute wrap-up of the proceedings in the O. J. Simpson murder case for KDFI—which aired in place of the 10 p.m. news rebroadcast—during the summer and fall of 1994.

=== As a Fox station ===
==== New World Communications ownership ====
On May 23, 1994, in an overall deal in which network parent News Corporation also acquired a 20% equity interest in the company, Atlanta-based New World Communications signed a long-term affiliation agreement with the Fox Broadcasting Company. Under the initial agreement, nine television stations affiliated with either CBS, ABC or NBC—five of the seven that New World acquired through its 1992 purchase of SCI Television, and four others that it acquired on May 5 from Great American Communications (in a separate deal for $350 million in cash and $10 million in share warrants)—would become Fox affiliates once their existing respective affiliation contracts expired. The deal was part of a strategy by Fox to strengthen its affiliate portfolio after the National Football League (NFL) accepted the network's $1.58 billion bid for the television rights to the National Football Conference (NFC), a four-year contract that began with the 1994 NFL season, on December 17, 1993. At the time, Fox's stations were mostly UHF outlets that had limited to no prior history as major network affiliates; among them was its existing Dallas outlet KDAF, which News Corporation purchased through its May 1985 merger with Metromedia and was among Fox's original group of six owned-and-operated stations when the network launched in October 1986.

On May 26, New World bought the four Argyle Television stations for $717 million (including approximately $280 million in debt), in a purchase option-structured deal. Under the terms, New World included KDFW, KTBC and KTVI in the group's affiliation agreement with Fox (WVTM, now owned by Hearst Television, remained an NBC affiliate as New World chose to transfer Birmingham ABC affiliate WBRC into a trust company for later sale to Fox Television Stations—an arrangement that was part of a deal also involving ABC affiliate WGHP in High Point, North Carolina, to comply with FCC restrictions at the time that prohibited broadcasting companies from owning more than twelve television stations nationwide and, in the case of Birmingham, barred television station duopolies—and was subsequently sold to NBC before being purchased by Media General in 2006). Although the network already owned KDAF, Fox sought the opportunity to align with KDFW because of its stronger market position (the station placed second, behind WFAA, in total day and news viewership at the time) and its operation of a news department; as a result, Fox Television Stations decided to sell KDAF, which would ultimately trade it to Renaissance Broadcasting in exchange for existing Fox affiliate KDVR in Denver.

CBS had a thirteen-month leeway to find a new Dallas–Fort Worth affiliate, as its contract with KDFW did not expire until July 1, 1995; the affiliation contracts for KTBC and KTVI expired around the same time, giving the networks that were already affiliated with the three former Argyle stations slated to switch to Fox a longer grace period to find new affiliates than CBS, NBC and/or ABC were given in most of the other markets affected by the Fox-New World deal (ABC's affiliation contracts with WGHP and WBRC ended even later, respectively expiring in September 1995 and September 1996). CBS first approached longtime NBC affiliate KXAS-TV about negotiating an affiliation deal, ultimately to be turned down by its then-owner LIN Broadcasting, which subsequently signed a long-term affiliation deal renewing its contract with KXAS and its NBC-affiliated sister stations in Austin, Norfolk and Grand Rapids; WFAA was eliminated as an option as ABC reached a new long-term agreement with then-owner of the station, Belo, to extend affiliation contracts for WFAA and other Belo-owned stations that were affiliated with the network; that deal resulted in the company's station in Sacramento switching its affiliation from CBS to ABC in March 1995.

This left independent station KTVT as CBS' only viable option among the Metroplex's VHF television stations, particularly as it was the only other English language station in the market that had a news department. (At the time, KTVT had been producing a prime time newscast—originally airing at 7 pm, before being shifted to 9 p.m. in January 1991 to reduce preemptions caused by the station's sports telecasts—since August 1990; however, the station had been producing short- and/or long-form newscasts in various formats since 1960.) On September 14, 1994, Gaylord Broadcasting reached an agreement to affiliate KTVT with CBS, in exchange for also switching its sister independent station in Tacoma, Washington, KSTW, to the network. (WB network majority owner Time Warner would later file an injunction attempting to dissolve a previous agreement with Gaylord to turn KTVT, KSTW and KHTV in Houston [now CW affiliate KIAH, which became a sister station to KDAF when Tribune Broadcasting acquired the latter from Renaissance in 1996] into charter affiliates of The WB at that network's launch in January 1995.) New World took over the operations of the Argyle stations through time brokerage agreements on January 19, 1995; the group's purchase of the four Argyle stations received approval on April 14, 1995, and was finalized four days later on April 18. The last CBS network program to air on KDFW was a repeat of Walker, Texas Ranger at 9 p.m. Central Time on July 1; this led into a message by then-station president and general manager David Whitaker shortly before the start of its late-evening newscast (which was renamed from News 4 Texas Nightbeat to News 4 Texas at 10:00 that evening, with the implementation of a new graphics package centered partly on imagery of the Texas state flag), informing viewers about the pending network changes.

KDFW switched to Fox on July 2, 1995, ending its relationship with CBS after 45½ years; with Fox switching from UHF to VHF, Dallas–Fort Worth became one of a handful of markets where all of the "Big Four" networks maintained affiliations with VHF stations (along with New York City, Los Angeles, San Francisco, Washington, D.C., Seattle, Tucson, Miami, Salt Lake City, Las Vegas, Albuquerque, Honolulu, Boise and Anchorage; Reno joined this distinction in 1996, followed by Portland and Minneapolis–St. Paul in 2002; in both Boise and Honolulu, the Fox affiliation switched from one VHF station to another). The remainder of CBS' programming moved on that date to KTVT, which consequently ceased distribution as a regional superstation on cable and satellite providers outside of its viewing area, as many of the markets where a pay television provider carried KTVT already had access to local or out-of-market CBS affiliates (KTBC joined Fox the same day, while KTVI followed suit on August 7). On that date, KDAF—whose sale to Renaissance Broadcasting was finalized the following day on July 3—became an affiliate of The WB; Christian Broadcasting Network-owned KXTX-TV (channel 39, now a Telemundo owned-and-operated station), which reverted into an independent station, served as the market's original WB outlet during the network's first six months of operation under a temporary arrangement until it could affiliate with KDAF when Fox moved to channel 4.

KDFW rebranded as "Fox 4 Texas" upon the affiliation switch, but with references to the Fox logo and name limited in most on-air imaging; although as with most of the other New World-owned stations affected by the agreement with Fox, channel 4 retained the news branding it had been using before it joined the network—in its case, News 4 Texas, which the station adopted in November 1990 as a CBS affiliate. (Even before the switch to Fox, the "4 Texas" motif was adopted as a universal brand, extending to weather and sports content produced by KDFW's news department, titled respectively as Weather 4 Texas and Sports 4 Texas.) In addition to expanding its local news programming at the time it joined Fox, the station replaced CBS daytime and late night programs that migrated to KTVT with an expanded slate of syndicated talk shows as well as some documentary-based reality series, and also acquired some movies and off-network drama series for broadcast on weekends; however, unusual for a Fox affiliate, the revamped programming schedule did not include sitcoms and, like New World's other Fox stations, ran children's programs only on weekend mornings.

==== Fox Television Stations ownership ====
On July 17, 1996, News Corporation—which separated most of its entertainment holdings into 21st Century Fox in July 2013—announced that it would acquire New World in an all-stock transaction worth $2.48 billion; the merger deal also included rights to the LMA with KDFI. The purchase by News Corporation was finalized on January 22, 1997, folding New World's ten Fox affiliates into the former's Fox Television Stations subsidiary and making all twelve stations affected by the 1994 agreement owned-and-operated stations of the network. (The New World Communications name continues in use as a licensing purpose corporation—as "New World Communications of [state/city], Inc." or "NW Communications of [state/city], Inc."—for KDFW and its sister stations under Fox ownership, extending, from 2009 to 2011, to the former New World stations that Fox sold to Local TV in 2007.) At that time, Channel 4 became the second English language network-owned commercial station in the Dallas–Fort Worth market (Viacom, then-owner of that network's Dallas station KTXA [channel 21, now an independent station], acquired part-ownership of UPN in 1996). It was also one of two stations that switched to Fox under the New World agreement that replaced an existing Fox O&O, only to later be sold to the network itself (in Atlanta, sister station WAGA had earlier replaced WATL as that market's Fox station in December 1994), making Dallas one of a handful of markets more than one station has served as an O&O of the same network. In November 1996, two months before the completion of the Fox–New World merger and at a time when other network-owned stations around the United States began adopting similar network-driven branding, KDFW-TV shortened its branding from "Fox 4 Texas" to simply "Fox 4" under the network's branding conventions (with its newscasts concurrently rebranding as Fox 4 News, and its weather and sports segments rebranded as Fox 4 Weather and Fox 4 Sports, respectively).

In April 1998, when NBC affiliate KTEN (which added an additional primary affiliation with Fox in September 1994, partly to carry its NFL telecasts) began terminating its affiliations with Fox and ABC, KDFW began serving as a default Fox station for portions of the adjacent Sherman–Ada market located south of the Oklahoma–Texas state line (including Gainesville, Durant and Hugo) through its availability on area cable providers (cable subscribers residing on the Oklahoma side of the market primarily received Fox network programs via KOKH-TV in Oklahoma City). Because the market lacked enough commercial television stations to allow the network to maintain an exclusive affiliation, Fox would not regain an affiliate within the market until CBS affiliate KXII launched a Fox-affiliated digital subchannel in September 2006.

In an effort to expand beyond the talk and court shows that KDFW had based its syndicated programming slate around since the July 1995 switch, the station added a few off-network sitcoms between the late 1990s and the mid-2000s—such as Seinfeld (which later moved to KDAF), King of the Hill (which later moved to KTXA), 3rd Rock From the Sun and Malcolm in the Middle—mainly as part of its late-night schedule. After sister station KDFI assumed rights to most of the sitcoms KDFW had previously aired in the 2008–09 season, no off-network comedies aired on KDFW's schedule (a rarity for a Fox station) until September 2013, when the station began airing reruns of Modern Family. In December 1999, Fox Television Stations purchased KDFI from Dallas Media Investors for $6.2 million, creating a legal duopoly with KDFW; as a result, the combination became the first television duopoly in the Metroplex and the first duopoly that Fox operated (predating the group's acquisition of Chris-Craft/United Television's UPN-affiliated stations later that year).

On December 14, 2017, The Walt Disney Company, owner of WFAA's affiliated network ABC, announced its intent to buy KDFW's parent company, 21st Century Fox, for $66.1 billion; the sale, which closed on March 20, 2019, excluded KDFW and sister station KDFI as well as the Fox network, the MyNetworkTV programming service, Fox News, Fox Sports 1 and the Fox Television Stations unit, which were all transferred to the newly formed Fox Corporation.

On September 5, 2018, a 34-year-old Michael Chadwick Fry crashed a silver Dodge Ram into KDFW–KDFI's Griffin Street studios around 6:12 am, while KDFW was broadcasting that morning's edition of Good Day. (News and production employees conducting the morning newscast said that they did hear the crash.) After twice ramming the truck into the building, Fry exited the truck, shattered a window pane in the building and entered into a rant about treason; he also placed numerous boxes filled with stacks of paper containing rambling notes next to a side door of the building, many of which were also strewn across the sidewalk and street adjacent to the building. The Dallas police temporarily evacuated most KDFW/KDFI employees—except for some who were placed in a secure part of the building to allow KDFW to provide coverage of the story—upon the discovery of a suspicious bag that was left behind, prompting bomb squad crews to investigate. Dallas police spokeswoman Senior Corporal Debra Webb said Fry's actions appeared not to be connected to any animosity toward the media, noting that he was apparently upset over a 2012 officer-involved shooting in a neighboring county (he was noted to have referenced the Denton County Sheriff's Department). Fry (whose criminal record includes arrests for assault, disorderly conduct, public intoxication and burglary) was taken to a hospital for a medical evaluation—police reported that he was in an agitated mental state and indicated "people were trying to kill him"—and subsequently was transferred to the Denton County Jail on a criminal mischief charge.

On January 14, 2025, Fox Television Stations broke ground on the future studios for KDFW/KDFI in the Las Colinas section of Irving on Royal Lane near the intersection of Bush Turnpike and I-635. Opening by 2027, the facility will have little to no visible transmission infrastructure on-site and that role fulfilled by a full fiber connection to Cedar Hill with a modern studio and newsroom design, along with audio suites for spoken word projects such as podcasts.

== Programming ==
As with most of its sister stations under its former New World ownership (with the subverted exception of former sister station KTVI in St. Louis, which assumed rights to the network's children's programs in 1996 and carried the blocks until Fox stopped providing them within its schedule), Channel 4 declined carriage of the children's programming blocks that Fox carried prior to 2008, only having aired fall preview specials and network promotions for those blocks that aired within Fox's prime time lineup during that twelve-year period.

KDFW opted not to run the Fox Kids weekday and Saturday blocks when it affiliated with the network, airing children's programs acquired via syndication on weekend mornings instead (the pre-emptions of Fox Kids by the New World stations led the network to change its carriage policies to allow Fox stations uninterested in carrying the block the right of first refusal to transfer the local rights to another station; by 2001, affiliates were no longer required to run the Fox Kids lineup even if Fox had not secured a substitute carrier). Fox Kids remained on KDAF after it became a WB affiliate in July 1995, before moving to KDFI in September 1997, where it and successor FoxBox/4Kids TV aired until Fox ceased supplying children's programming within its schedule on December 28, 2008; the paid programming block that replaced 4Kids TV, Weekend Marketplace, has aired on KDFI since then. Xploration Station, a live-action educational program block distributed by Steve Rotfeld Productions that is syndicated primarily to Fox stations (including those owned by Fox Television Stations), was similarly passed over to KDFI when that block debuted on September 13, 2014.

In September 1994, KDFW began preempting The Price Is Right and The Bold and the Beautiful, respectively replacing them with Donahue and the (short-lived) syndicated reality/court show Juvenile Justice in the respective network-designated time slots of the former two programs; KTVT began carrying the two CBS Daytime programs on a regular basis and also cleared select CBS prime time programs that channel 4 preempted to run locally produced specials.

In September 1972, the station premiered 4 Country Reporter, a weekly program hosted by Bob Phillips focusing on feature stories about noted points of interest and interesting people from around the state of Texas. After Phillips left KDFW in 1986, he bought the rights to the concept and began selling the show in regional syndication, accordingly retitling it as Texas Country Reporter; the program now airs on stations in all of Texas' 22 television markets, and nationally on cable and satellite on RFD-TV. KDFW did not acquire the local rights to the syndicated version, which was instead carried by rival ABC affiliate WFAA (under the title 8 Country Reporter). KDFW broadcast Dr. Red Duke's syndicated medical reports to viewers in North Texas throughout much of the 1980s and 1990s.

=== Sports programming ===
KDFW began serving as the primary television station for the Dallas Cowboys as a CBS affiliate in 1960 upon the team's enfranchisement, through CBS' television rights to the pre-AFL merger National Football League. The station carried most regional or national Cowboys game telecasts aired by CBS, including the team's victories in Super Bowl VI and Super Bowl XII, (after 1970, the only games channel 4 did not air were home interconference contests) until its contractual rights to the National Football Conference concluded in 1993. To date, the one-year interruption in game coverage after that season, due to the transfer of NFC telecast rights from CBS to Fox, is the only break in network coverage of the team by the station since 1962; for the 1994 season, most of the team's over-the-air game telecasts aired instead on lame-duck Fox O&O KDAF. Channel 4 resumed its status as the Cowboys' primary local broadcaster two months after it joined Fox, in September 1995; incidentally, that year's NFL season saw the Cowboys compete in Super Bowl XXX (which aired locally on NBC affiliate KXAS-TV), in which they defeated the Pittsburgh Steelers, 27–17, to win the championship title. KDFW also provided local coverage of Super Bowl XLV which took place at AT&T Stadium. KDFW also airs the Cowboys' Thanksgiving Day home contests (as part of Fox's national coverage) in even-numbered seasons.

Unlike in most other NFC markets with a Fox owned-and-operated station in which the station maintains such an arrangement with a local NFL franchise, KDFW does not carry any team-produced analysis or magazine programming; channel 4 held the local rights to air various team-related programs and specials during the regular season until 1998, when the local rights to these programs migrated to KTVT under a programming agreement reached between that station and the Cowboys earlier that year, in advance of CBS's assumption of the broadcast rights to the rival American Football Conference (AFC). The KTVT arrangement exists even though, as a CBS station, its telecasts of Cowboys regular season games are limited to those involving an AFC opponent or, since 2014, cross-flexed games declined by Fox that involve opponents in the NFC.

Since Fox obtained the partial (now exclusive) over-the-air network television rights to the league in 1996, KDFW has carried certain Major League Baseball (MLB) games featuring the Texas Rangers that have been regionally televised (and, since 2013, select national telecasts scheduled during prime time) by the network during the league's regular season and postseason, including the team's first-ever World Series win in 2023 and appearances in 2010 and 2011. It served as the host station for the 2020 World Series, which was played entirely at Globe Life Field. Additionally, from 1998 to 2009, KDFW also served as an alternate carrier of Rangers baseball games produced by co-owned regional sports network Fox Sports Southwest for broadcast on sister station KDFI, which served as the team's official flagship station during that period; KTXA (channel 21) assumed the local over-the-air television rights to the Rangers in 2010.

From 1995 until Fox lost the broadcast television rights to the National Hockey League (NHL) to ABC in 1999, KDFW carried certain regular season and playoff games featuring the Dallas Stars that Fox televised on a regional basis. Notably, in 1999 (Fox's last year with the NHL over-the-air broadcast contract), the station aired the Stars' first Stanley Cup Final appearance as a Dallas-based franchise (the third overall, counting their 1981 and 1991 appearances that preceded the former Minnesota North Stars' relocation from Minneapolis in 1993), which saw the franchise defeat the Buffalo Sabres to win its first Stanley Cup (as Fox's NHL contract required it to split the Finals coverage rights with the league's cable partner, the decisive game six of that series aired instead on cable through ESPN). Stars games would return in 2025 as part of an agreement with the Stars and Victory+ to locally simulcast two games on KDFW. Two additional games will air on sister station KDFI.

=== News operation ===
As of October 2024, KDFW presently broadcasts 77 1/2 hours of locally produced newscasts each week (with 13 1/2 hours on weekdays, four hours on Saturdays and six hours on Sundays); in regards to the number of hours devoted to news programming, it is the largest local newscast output among broadcast television stations in the Dallas–Fort Worth market. In addition, KDFW produces the half-hour sports highlight, opinion and interview program Free 4 All, hosted by sports director Mike Doocy and co-host Sam Gannon, which airs Sundays after the 9 p.m. newscast and weeknights after the 10 p.m. newscast. The station's Sunday 5 p.m. newscast is subject to preemption and the Saturday 6 p.m. newscast is subject to delay due to overruns by Fox Sports telecasts.

==== News department history ====
Appropriate for a station that was founded by a newspaper, local news has always had a strong presence on Channel 4. For the better part of four decades, it was part of a spirited battle for first place among the market's news-producing stations with KXAS and WFAA. In November 1978, the station hired Clarice Tinsley (who joined KDFW from CBS affiliate and eventual sister station WITI in Milwaukee, which also became a Fox affiliate through the New World deal) to serve as anchor of its 10 p.m. newscast and conduct special assignment reports, the latter of which (through investigative reports and interviews on which she has been assigned) has earned her several journalism awards over her career with the station (including Associated Press, Emmy and Peabody Awards and a duPont-Columbia Citation for Excellence); as of 2016, she is currently the third longest-tenured overall and the second longest-tenured currently active television news personality in North Texas, and has had the longest tenure of any on-air staff member in KDFW's history (in the former category, Tinsley ranks behind Harold Taft, who served as chief meteorologist at KXAS-TV from its sign-on as WBAP-TV in 1948 until his retirement in 1991, and Bobbie Wygant, who served as an entertainment reporter for WBAP/KXAS from 1948 until her death in 2024). Although KDFW has experienced a relative degree of talent turnover over the years (particularly during the 1980s and early 1990s), several anchors and reporters that have been part of Channel 4's news department staff have worked for the station for at least ten years (in addition to Tinsley, these have included Richard Ray, who joined KDFW as a reporter in 1983 and has also served as weekend evening anchor from 1995 until his retirement in 2019; Ron Jackson, who served as weekend meteorologist from 1982 until his retirement in 2014; and Becky Oliver, who served as its chief investigative reporter from 1991 until her retirement from broadcasting in 2015).

On January 6, 1980, the station debuted Insights, a weekly public affairs program featuring topical discussions and feature stories focusing on the Dallas–Fort Worth metroplex's ethnic community, focusing primarily on issues affecting African Americans. The program was originally hosted by Rochelle Brown until 2002, when she relegated herself to an executive producer role and was succeeded by longtime general assignment reporter Shaun Rabb (who also served as weekend evening anchor from 1993 to 1994) for the remainder of its run; the Emmy Award-winning Sunday morning program ended its 29-year run on June 21, 2009.

On May 12, 1986, to inaugurate the rollout of its new satellite news-gathering units and to commemorate the sesquicentennial of Texas' independence, KDFW kicked off an ambitious three-week tour across Texas, in which the station conducted live remotes at different locations around the state each day for its early evening newscasts. As it was returning from Van Horn (the first site of the tour) that evening, a Bell JetRanger used by the station as its newsgathering helicopter crashed after takeoff at Guadalupe Mountains National Park while pilot Irving Patrick attempted to navigate the chopper in strong wind speeds. Patrick and news operations manager Scott "Buster" McGregor were killed on board; however in the midst of the tragedy, KDFW's news staff chose to continue the cross-state tour as scheduled. In May 1993, KDFW became the first television station in Dallas–Fort Worth to launch a weekend morning newscast, with the debut of a two-hour Saturday broadcast from 8 to 10 a.m. (the program—which, uniformly with the weekday morning newscasts and formerly titled News 4 Texas Morning Edition, was re-titled Good Day Dallas [now Fox 4 Good Day] in January 1997—would later move to 7 to 9 a.m. on April 4, 2010, and was joined by a Sunday edition in that same time period on July 10, 2011).

When KDFW became a Fox affiliate on July 2, 1995, the station sharply expanded its emphasis on local news programming. It retained a news schedule similar to the one it had as a CBS affiliate, while increasing its news output from about 25 hours a week to nearly 40 hours (with its weekday news schedule expanding from 3 1/2 hours to seven hours per day). In its early years with Fox, local news programming on the station ran on weekdays from 5:30 to 9 a.m., noon to 12:30 p.m. and 6 to 6:30 p.m., Saturday mornings, and nightly from 5 to 6 p.m. and 9 to 10:30 p.m. The weekday morning newscast's expansion from 1 1/2 to three hours—with the addition of a two-hour extension from 7 to 9 a.m.—and the consolidation of its half-hour weeknight 5 and 6 p.m. newscasts into a single 90-minute block—although both programs were respectively structured as separate one-hour and half-hour broadcasts—filled timeslots vacated by the removals of CBS This Morning and the CBS Evening News from its schedule as Fox, unlike CBS, does not have daily national newscasts. Since Fox does not provide a third hour of network programming within its evening schedule, Channel 4 also added an hour-long prime time newscast at 9 p.m. to lead into its existing 10 p.m. newscast (KDFW is one of several Fox stations that offer newscasts in both the final hour of prime time and the traditional late news time slot—Fox Television Stations started to push news expansion into the latter in 2006—and one of ten that continued its Big Three-era late-evening newscast after switching to Fox; in contrast, Austin sister station KTBC aired syndicated programming as a lead-in for its existing 10 p.m. newscast after it switched to Fox before it moved its late newscast to the 9 p.m. hour in August 2000, that station would restore a late newscast in the former slot in September 2014).

On the date of the network switch, KDFW also debuted a daily local sports news program within its 9 p.m. newscast, Sports 4 Texas, which also served as a generalized branding for its sports segments until January 1997; the program—which ran for 20 minutes on Monday through Friday nights (as well as Saturdays, with the exception of the NFL season, when the prime time newscast was abbreviated by a half-hour to air the Cowboys magazine show The Aikman-Summerall Report), and for a half-hour on Sundays—eventually evolved into its present weekly half-hour format as Fox 4 Sports Sunday in September 1997, when KDFW discontinued the weekend editions of its 10 p.m. newscast, relegating that newscast to Monday through Friday evenings (Fox late night programming airs on Saturdays at 10 pm, while Free 4 All—which launched as a weeknight-only program on September 4, 2018, and replaced Sports Sunday as part of a reformatting into a six-night-a-week, Sunday-through-Friday program in March 2019—airs Sundays in that time slot). In advance of the switch, KDFW station management offered news department employees a one-month pay bonus as an incentive to agree to stay until or after the affiliation switch. Because Fox did not have a news division—and by association, an affiliate news service—at the time KDFW joined the network (Fox News Channel and the Fox News Edge video service would not launch until August 1996), the station's news department initially relied on external video feeds from CNN Newsource for coverage of national and international news stories; the station also increased its news staff from 80 to 120 employees, through the hiring of 40 additional employees in both on-air and behind-the-scenes roles.

The expansion of the news department as well as other programming changes that occurred when Channel 4 switched to Fox were the subject of a scathing article by writer Brad Bailey in the October 1995 issue of D Magazine, criticizing the news department for a perceived incorporation of sensationalistic reports to fill time within its expanded newscasts and KDFW as a whole for adopting a syndicated programming lineup consisting largely of tabloid talk shows (such as The Maury Povich Show, Geraldo and Jerry Springer, following suit with other New World-owned Fox stations that acquired such programs to bulk up their syndication lineups after joining the network), referring to the station's decision to maintain its status as a "big, legitimate news operation" while operating as a Fox affiliate as conflicting and incompatible courses (before New World started switching most of its stations to Fox in September 1994, Fox stations tended to focus predominately on first-run and off-network syndicated programs and movies, with limited to no local news programming; Miami affiliate WSVN's decision to adopt a news-intensive programming format after switching from NBC to Fox in January 1989 served as the template for the New World and SF Broadcasting stations that switched to Fox between 1994 and 1996, a format that was gradually adopted by many heritage Fox stations that had existing or launched upstart news departments in subsequent years). The article was criticized by KDFW president/general manager David Whitaker, and main evening anchors Clarice Tinsley and John Criswell, the latter of whom (who left KDFW in 1997, after a seven-year tenure at the station) stated that Bailey could not have "accomplished a more reprehensible mass assassination of character with a machine gun or bomb". Although ratings for its newscasts declined in the first couple of months after it joined Fox due to viewer confusion over the switch (which Whitaker acknowledged had also resulted in ratings losses at its competitors at that time), KDFW began regaining some of its news audience starting in the fall of 1995; it has since often beat its English-language competitors in the demographic of adults between 25 and 54 years old in certain time slots, particularly in the morning and at 9 p.m.

Starting in 2006, the Fox-owned stations began revamping their sets and graphics to be more closely aligned visually with Fox News Channel, along with the adoption of standardized "kitebox" logos. KDFW debuted the new logo, set, graphics and theme music on September 20, 2006, beginning with its 9 p.m. newscast. The station also relaunched its website under the "myfox" branding and interface developed by Fox Interactive Media, incorporating more news and video content (the Fox O&O sites have since been migrated to the WorldNow web platform). On July 30, 2007, a Bell JetRanger helicopter leased by KDFW from CBS Radio crash-landed in a heavily wooded area near the Joe Pool Lake spillway (south of Camp Wisdom Road) in Grand Prairie, while it was making an emergency landing after the aircraft's engine lost power (which the National Transportation Safety Board determined was caused by the failure of one or more of the compressor blades for the fifth stage compressor) en route to a breaking news story in Fort Worth that morning. The out-of-control chopper skidded and rolled before stopping near the spillway, shearing off the tail rotor from the main body of the helicopter. Chopper pilot Curtis Crump, KDFW traffic reporter Chip Waggoner and KRLD and KVIL (103.7 FM) radio traffic reporter Julie DeHarty survived the accident, with the latter two transported by ambulance to Methodist Dallas Medical Center for treatment.

On February 18, 2009, beginning with its noon newscast, KDFW became the fifth television station in the Dallas–Fort Worth market to begin broadcasting its local newscasts in high definition. On April 5, 2010, the station expanded its weekday morning newscast to 4 1/2 hours, with the addition of a half-hour at 4:30 a.m. Good Day was eventually expanded to 4 a.m. on May 9, 2018, extending it into a five-hour broadcast; subsequently on September 4, the station expanded Good Day to the 9 a.m. hour, resulting in KDFW becoming the second-to-last remaining Fox-owned station to expand its weekday morning newscast into the slot (which, since the program—as Live with Regis and Kathie Lee—moved to KDFW from KTVT in September 1993, has long been ceded to Live with Kelly and Mark and its previous incarnations; that program was moved to 10 a.m. as a result; WJZY in Charlotte remains the last station to end its morning newscast at 9 a.m.). To accommodate the expansion (which placed Good Day in direct competition with WFAA's news/talk program Good Morning Texas), Hanna Battah (who joined KDFW from CBS affiliate KBAK-TV and Fox affiliate KBFX-CD in Bakersfield in June to serve as weekend anchor of Good Day) was added as co-anchor of the first two hours of the program with a co-anchor to be named later, while Tim Ryan (who has anchored KDFW's morning newscast since joining the station shortly after the 1995 affiliation switch) and Lauren Przybyl (who joined KDFW in September 2009) being shifted to the 6–10 a.m. portion of the broadcast.

==== Notable current on-air staff ====
- Clarice Tinsley – anchor

==== Notable former on-air staff ====
- Mark Alford – reporter/anchor (early 1990s)
- Ashleigh Banfield – anchor (1995–2000)
- Katherine Creag – reporter (2002–2005)
- Peter Daut – reporter/anchor (2008–2012)
- Sam Donaldson – announcer (1959–1960)
- Wayne Freedman – reporter (1980–1981)
- Frank Glieber – sports reporter/anchor
- Cynthia Gouw – weekend anchor/reporter (1993–1994)
- Judd Hambrick – anchor (1972–1973)
- Dale Hansen – sports anchor (1980–1983)
- Craig James – sports anchor (1992–1993)
- Dick Johnson – anchor (1976–1982)
- Bill Mercer – sportscaster/wrestling announcer (1953–1964)
- Mark Mullen – reporter (1989–1991)
- Bob Phillips – host of 4 Country Reporter (1972–1986)
- Dick Risenhoover – sports anchor (1970–1973)
- Brad Sham – sports reporter (late 1970s)
- James Spann – meteorologist (mid-1980s)
- Casey Stegall – reporter (2005–2007)
- Ray Szmanda – anchor (1975–1978)
- Roger Twibell – sports reporter (1975–1976)
- Wes Wise – sports anchor (1960s)

== Technical information ==
=== Subchannels ===
The station's signal is multiplexed:

Subchannels of KDFW
| Subchannel | Res. | Short name | Programming |
|---|---|---|---|
| 4.1 | 720p | KDFW-DT | Fox |
| 4.2 | 480i | KDFW D2 | KDFI (Independent with MyNetworkTV) in SD |
| 4.3 | 480i | Heroes | Heroes & Icons |
| 4.4 | 480i | GetTV | Great |
| 4.5 | 480i | Nosey | Nosey |

Simulcast of subchannels of another station

=== Analog-to-digital conversion ===
KDFW began transmitting a digital signal on UHF channel 35 on September 10, 1998. The station ended regular programming on its analog signal, over VHF channel 4, on June 12, 2009, as part of the federally mandated transition from analog to digital television. The station's digital signal remained on its pre-transition UHF channel 35, using virtual channel 4.

Through its participation as a SAFER Act "nightlight" broadcaster, KDFW kept its analog signal on the air until July 12 to inform viewers of the digital television transition through a loop of public service announcements from the National Association of Broadcasters.
