= Richard Ray (journalist) =

American journalist and filmmaker

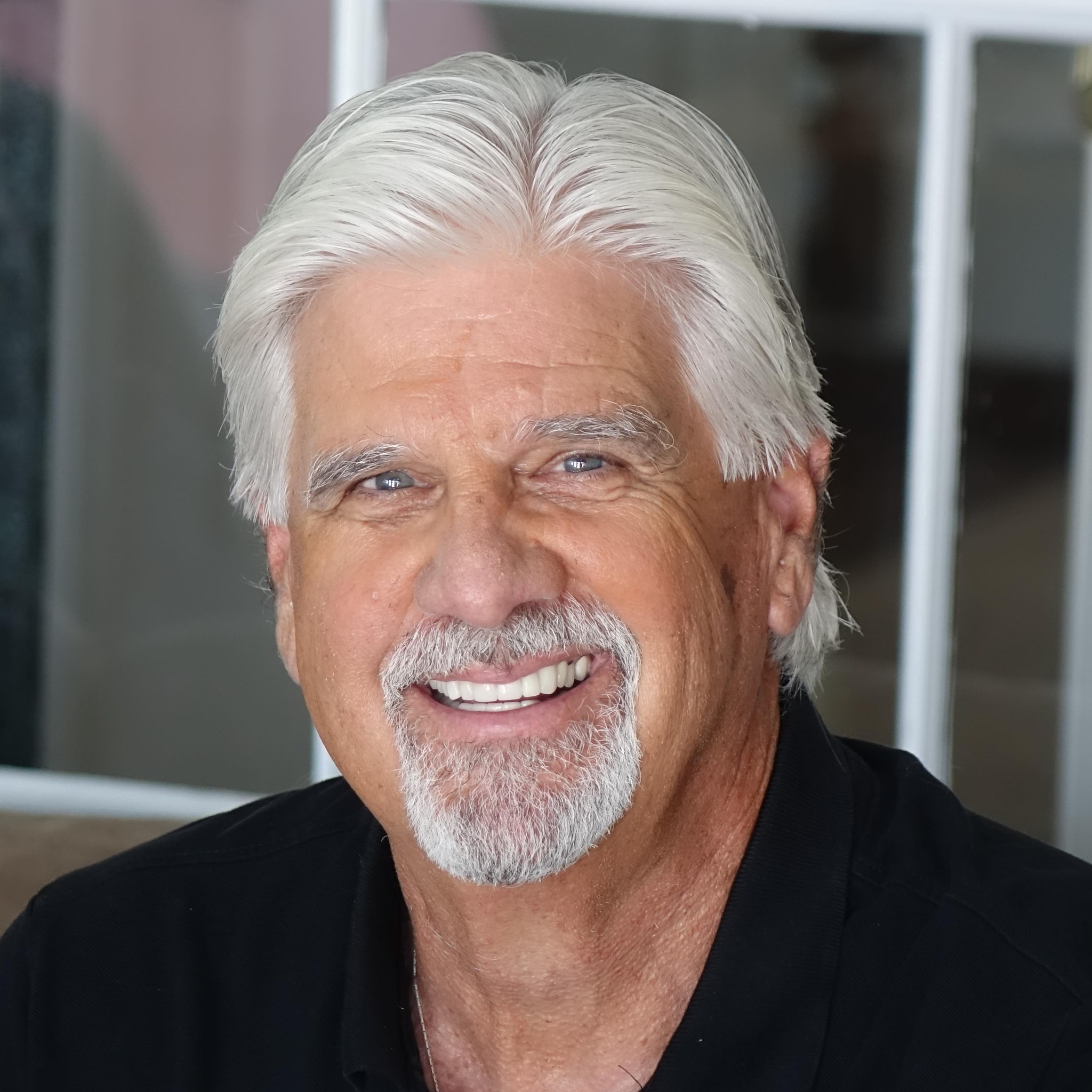
- Ray in 2019
- Born: August 17, 1950 (age 75); Owatonna, Minnesota, U.S.
- Education: University of Minnesota (BA)
- Occupations: Journalist, documentary filmmaker
- Years active: 1973–present
- Employer: KDFW-TV (1983–2019)
- Known for: Television journalism and documentary filmmaking
- Spouses: Eleen Bertie (m. 1973; div. 1993); Catherine Belue Ray (m. 1995; died 2024)
- Children: 3

Richard Ray (born August 17, 1950) is an American television journalist and documentary filmmaker. He is best known for his tenure as an anchor and reporter at KDFW in the Dallas–Fort Worth metroplex, where he worked from 1983 to 2019. Over a career spanning more than four decades, he received multiple Emmy Awards and a George Foster Peabody Award.

== Early life and education ==
Ray was born in Owatonna, Minnesota, and raised in West Concord, Minnesota, a rural farming community. He graduated from West Concord High School in 1968 and earned a Bachelor of Arts degree in sociology from the University of Minnesota in 1972.

== Career ==
=== Early career ===
Ray began his broadcast career in 1973 at KROC-TV in Rochester, Minnesota, working as a photographer and reporter. He later worked at WHO-TV in Des Moines, Iowa, and WMT-TV in Cedar Rapids, Iowa.

From 1980 to 1983, he was a reporter and producer at WNGE-TV in Nashville, Tennessee.

=== KDFW-TV ===
Ray joined KDFW in the Dallas–Fort Worth metroplex in 1983 and remained with the station until his retirement in 2019.

Upon his retirement, Fort Worth Star-Telegram columnist Budd Kennedy described Ray as part of a generation of long-tenured local television journalists whose careers reflected deep ties to the communities they covered.

During his tenure, he covered a wide range of major news stories and was known for investigative and political reporting. He also served as an embedded journalist with the 4th Infantry Division during the early stages of the Iraq War in 2003.

=== Documentary work ===
Ray has been involved in the production of several documentary projects.

He was a reporter, writer, and co-producer of JFK: The Dallas Tapes (1998), a documentary co-produced with The Sixth Floor Museum at Dealy Plaza, which received a Heartland Regional Emmy Award.

He also contributed to JFK: The Torch Is Passed (2000), a follow-up documentary examining the legacy of John F. Kennedy.

=== Post-retirement work ===
Following his retirement from KDFW in 2019, Ray transitioned into documentary filmmaking and on-camera work.

He served as a location producer and presenter for the television documentary series The Flight Attendant Murders (2023).

He has also appeared as a presenter on the Oxygen series Homicide for the Holidays.

In addition to his documentary work, Ray has appeared in several film and television productions, including Bull Shark (2022), Night Night (2021), Caged Birds (2021), and Vindication (2025).

== Awards and honors ==
Ray has received numerous awards for his work in journalism, including:

- George Foster Peabody Award (1984) for A Call for Help
- Heartland Regional Emmy Award (1999) for JFK: The Dallas Tapes
- Multiple Lone Star Regional Emmy Awards

He has also received honors from the Texas Associated Press Broadcasters, the Radio Television News Directors Association, and the Dallas Press Club.

== Mission and humanitarian work ==
In March 2022, Ray volunteered with Texas Baptist Men in Poland following the Russian invasion of Ukraine. According to KDFW (FOX 4), he was part of one of the organization's early teams assisting refugees near the Poland–Ukraine border.

Ray has also been involved with multiple faith-based and humanitarian organizations. He has served on the board of Ndoto: For Africa's Future, a Texas nonprofit focused on education and community development in Kenya, where he has participated in mission efforts and organizational leadership.

== Personal life ==
Ray married Eleen Bertie in 1973, and the couple had three children before divorcing in 1993. In 1995, he married Catherine Belue Ray, who died in 2024.
