= Gary DeLaune =

American news reporter (1933–2022)

Gary DeLaune (June 20, 1933 – February 6, 2022) born Gary DeLaune Glasscock was an American news reporter and sportscaster for KENS-TV 5 in San Antonio, Texas, and reporter for KLIF-AM 1190 in Dallas, Texas.

DeLaune, during his time at KLIF, was among the first reporters to announce that President John F. Kennedy had been shot in Dallas; continuing to file reports in the aftermath of Kennedy's eventual death; later being on the scene reporting when accused assassin Lee Harvey Oswald was himself killed by Jack Ruby.

DeLaune also served as a commentator for the Dallas Cowboys during their early years and covered games for the San Antonio Spurs, eventually being inducted into the Lone Star Basketball, Texas Radio, San Antonio Radio and San Antonio Sports halls of fame.

In addition to the on-the-scene coverage of the Kennedy assassination, DeLaune also worked as a color commentator on KLIF's airing of Dallas Cowboys National Football League games on radio from the 1963 to the 1966 seasons. He then worked for KRLD-AM in Dallas and then briefly in Houston before moving to San Antonio to cover the San Antonio Spurs; who had recently relocated from Dallas, where they were known as the Chaparrals in the American Basketball Association; calling games for the Spurs from 1973 to 1977 and eventually being hired as a sports reporter for San Antonio CBS affiliate KENS-TV. DeLaune also covered the 1979 Battle of Flowers Parade sniper attack in San Antonio during that year's Fiesta San Antonio where two people were killed and 50 people – including six police officers – wounded before the shooter, Ira Attebury, was found dead in his RV.

DeLaune was born to his parents Norman and Sudie Glasscock in 1933. He had one brother named Norman “Woody” Glasscock who he had a great relationship with.

Following a battle with COVID-19, DeLaune died on February 6, 2022, at the age of 88.
