= Battle of Flowers =

Battle of Flowers can mean any of the following:

- Jersey Battle of Flowers
- Battle of Flowers Parade held yearly during Fiesta San Antonio
- Battle of flowers a fiesta held in Laredo, Cantabria, Spain
- a flower parade
