= Carnival of Santa Cruz de la Sierra =

Traditional festival in Santa Cruz de la Sierra, Bolivia

- Type: Cultural, religious
- Significance: Pre-Easter celebration
- Celebrations: Parades, coronations, traditional games, and dances
- Begins: First weekend in January (Pre-Carnival celebrations)
- Ends: Ash Wednesday (carnavalito)
- Date: March 1st (official)
- Duration: 4 days (official)
- Frequency: Annual
- Related to: Carnival, Santa Cruz de la Sierra, Holy Week

The Carnival of Santa Cruz de la Sierra (Spanish: Carnaval de Santa Cruz de la Sierra), also known as the "Big Festival of the Cruceños" (Spanish: Fiesta Grande de los Cruceños), is a cultural and religious festival of Spanish origin celebrated in the city of Santa Cruz de la Sierra, Bolivia. It has been officially held since 1561, coinciding with the city's founding. The celebration officially begins with a grand folkloric parade called "El Corso," in which numerous comparsas (carnival troupes) participate.

The Santa Cruz carnival is the largest and one of the oldest in the country; after Carnaval de Oruro, this is Bolivia's second most important carnival. In 2013, it was declared a Cultural Heritage of Bolivia under the "Law of Carnival". It is one of the largest carnivals in South America, with 4k in the cambódromo.

== History ==
The city of Santa Cruz de la Sierra was founded in 1561, but carnival celebrations brought by the Spaniards date back to the 19th century. Early festivities consisted of horseback parades through the streets, and people played by throwing powder and dirt at each other. Tuesday was reserved for dancing, while Ash Wednesday marked the beginning of Lent. The celebration lasted 11 days, during which the governor, through a public council (cabildo), would order the slaughter of cattle for public feasts.

During the 1970s, the Bolivian government under Hugo Banzer attempted to suppress the celebration. By the late 20th century, the carnival began incorporating more mestizo cultural elements, including traditional music, dances, and attire such as the taquirari, chovena, sarao, and the typical tipoy dress.

In the early 21st century, garages replaced the traditional "waiting houses" (Spanish: casas de espera) that had existed since around 1880. These houses were used by neighbors to welcome comparsas and participate in uninhibited revelry. The new garage gatherings served a similar role but were initially exclusive to male members of specific groups.

== Culture ==
The carnivals of eastern Bolivia represent the culture of this region in their costumes, music, and dances, which is why some may notice similarities with the Brazilian carnival, as both feature elements of Amazonian and European culture, but the Brazilian carnival was brought by the Portuguese and the Santa Cruz carnival by the Spanish. The carnival in Santa Cruz de la Sierra represents all the ecoregions of the department of Santa Cruz, especially those of the Santa Cruz Amazon and the Chiquitanía.

=== Queens of the Santa Cruz carnival ===
In 1936, the first queen of the Santa Cruz carnival was chosen. However, in 1937, the first "official" queen was chosen, as the role became more important. Soledad Arrien Gutiérrez won thanks to a contest promoted by a media outlet. The carnival queen for 2025 is Ariane Torrico, or Ariane I, crowned at a gala organized by the Association of Carnival Companies of Santa Cruz (ACCC) and the crowning company "Los Pengas" in the Sirionó Hall of Expocruz.

==== Queens of the 2020s ====
Year	Name of the Queen	Age	Coroners
2020	Romy Paz Arteaga (1992-)	28 years old	Los Chirapas Jrs.
2021	Iciar Díaz Camacho (1996-)	25 years old	Los Piltrafas
2022	Dayana Molina Espinosa (1996-)	25 years old	Los Picarazos
2023	María Laura Zamora Sanjines (2000-)	25 years old	Los Januchos Jr.
2024	Aitana Tufiño Cronenbold (2001-)	22 years old	Los Ociosos
2025	Ariane Torrico Domínguez (1999-)	25 years old	Los Pengas

== Main Events and Traditions ==
The "Fiesta Grande de los Cruceños" is divided into two parts. One week before the official carnival, there are celebrations for youth groups, among other activities.

Before Carnival:

- Pre-carnival celebrations and the festival of the god Momo.
- Garage (or parking lot) Carnival.
- The carnival mail.
- Coronation of the Carnival Queen.
- Start of the eleven nights of masquerade balls.
- The coronations of the queens
- Preliminary parades.

During Carnival:

- Coronation of King Momo: marks the official start of the Santa Cruz Carnival.
- Carnival parade (grand parade).

Street carnival: the three days of Mojazón.

- The carnivalito: burial of the doll and Ash Wednesday .

=== Pre-carnival celebrations ===
The so-called "precas" are activities that take place every weekend in January, before the Corso Cruceño. They consist of parties accompanied by parades of floats with universal themes or political satire, organized by different carnival groups dressed up according to the chosen theme, who dance along 24 de Septiembre Street to the Plazuela del Estudiante, always accompanied by the carnival queen, who has a different float and costume each night, along with the coronation entourage.

=== The corso ===
A corso is a carnival parade showcasing the best of each troupe. The grand corso kicks off the official carnival and takes place on March 1.In 2025, more than 300 troupes paraded in the grand corso held at the cambódromo.

== See also ==
- Santa Cruz de la Sierra
- Carnaval de Oruro
- Santa Cruz Department
