= Blackie Sherrod =

American journalist (1919–2016)

William Forrest "Blackie" Sherrod (/ˈʃɛrəd/ SHERR-əd; November 9, 1919 – April 28, 2016) was an American journalist and sportswriter who wrote for the Temple Telegram, Fort Worth Press, Dallas Times Herald and The Dallas Morning News in a career that spanned more than sixty years. Voted Texas Sportswriter of the Year a record sixteen times, he was called "the best writer I ever read" by Don January and "the best newspaperman I ever knew" by Felix McKnight who hired Sherrod at the Times Herald in 1958. Despite not being as well known nationally as he was in Texas, he was the mentor to both Dan Jenkins and Bud Shrake.

Sherrod attended Baylor University for the 1937–1938 academic year, but transferred to Howard Payne University where he graduated with a Bachelor of Arts in English in May 1941.

He was the color analyst with Bill Mercer on Dallas Cowboys radio broadcasts on KLIF-AM from 1967 to 1969. Sherrod relinquished his duties to Verne Lundquist after he was disgusted over a piece of ice that hit his hat while he was standing next to the press box elevator at Pitt Stadium in December 1969.
