= Eddie Barker =

American journalist

Edmund Asa "Eddie" Barker Jr. (August 18, 1927 – July 23, 2012) was a television reporter in Dallas, Texas, perhaps best known for being the first newsman to report the death of John F. Kennedy, and his interview with Marina Oswald.

Barker was born in San Antonio, Texas, and began his radio career in 1943. He later went to Dallas' KRLD (now KDFW), where in 1963, he was covering the visit of President Kennedy to Dallas. After the assassination, he was first to report the president's death on CBS, 5 minutes before the network feed, and Walter Cronkite's famous flash.

Later, he secured the first interview with Marina Oswald, the wife of assassin Lee Harvey Oswald.

Barker died in July 2012 in Dallas, of natural causes.
