= Insights (TV series) =

Insights is a public affairs television program based in Dallas, Texas. Originated by KDFW-TV program director Joe Bell, the show premiered on that station — then a CBS affiliate — on January 6, 1980. Originally focused on African-American issues, the program expanded over the years to cover topics of greater diversity, though the majority of guests continue to be Black. Insights won Emmy Awards in 2001 and 2004 for its episodes "Identity Lost" and "Paternity Fraud" and was nominated in 1997 and 1998 as well. The show also has received the award for best public affairs program in America by the National Association of Black Journalists and the Phoebe Award from the Texas Congress of Parent Teacher Associations.
