= Clarice Tinsley =

American broadcast journalist (born 1954)

- Born: December 31, 1954 (age 70)
- Occupation: Television news anchor
- Years active: 1975—present
- Employer(s): WITI (TV) (1974-1978); KDFW (1978—present)
- Spouse: Stephen Giles (1987–present)
- Awards: 1984 Peabody Award; 1980 duPont Award

Clarice Tinsley (born December 31, 1954) is an American broadcast journalist. In November 1978, she moved to the Dallas–Fort Worth metroplex to anchor the ten o'clock news for KDFW-TV (the CBS station for the market at the time, now a Fox O&O). In 1979 the six o'clock news was added to her duties. As of 2012, she is the longest-serving news anchor in the Dallas/Fort Worth television market.

Prior to KDFW, she spent three years working for WITI TV 6 in Milwaukee. At WITI her duties included being the host of a monthly community affairs show, news reporter and news anchor.

Tinsley has appeared as a news anchor or reporter in several Dallas-based television productions, including The Good Guys, Prison Break, Walker, Texas Ranger and Dallas.

== Awards ==
In the 1980s, her work on "A Call For Help," an investigative reporting series on problems with Dallas' 911 emergency system, earned KDFW both a Peabody Award in 1984 and a 1980 Alfred I. duPont–Columbia University Award for investigative journalism.

In 2007 she was awarded the Director's Community Leadership Award from the FBI.
