= Casey Stegall =

American journalist

Casey Stegall is an American journalist who was a senior network correspondent for the Fox News Channel. He parted ways with the network in May 2024. Stegall rejoined the Fox family in January 2025 as the evening weekend anchor at KDFW, Fox 4 in Dallas, Texas. The station is owned and operated by the Fox TV Station Group.

In 2007, he won the Outstanding Reporter of the Year award from the Headliners Foundation.
