= Dale Hansen =

American sportscaster (born 1948)

Dale Eugene Hansen (born August 2, 1948) is an American sportscaster, who formerly worked as the weeknight sports anchor during the 10 pm newscasts on ABC's Dallas affiliate WFAA, who left the station on September 2, 2021. He formerly also hosted Dale Hansen's Sports Special on Sundays at 10:35 pm, consistently one of the highest-rated local programs in Dallas-Fort Worth. His segment each night garnered an audience of over 300,000 people. He also served as the station's sports director.

== Personal life ==
Hansen was born in Logan, Iowa. After high school, Hansen served in the United States Navy. He now lives in Waxahachie, Texas. He is married and has two children.

== Military service ==
According to The New York Times, Hansen served in the United States Navy during the Vietnam War. Dale's best friend, Carrol Meyer, served in the Army, and was killed at the age of 18 after just six weeks of being deployed to Vietnam. On Memorial Day in 2018, the WFAA Channel 8 team surprised Hansen with a portrait of Meyer by a local artist. The gift brought tears to Hansen eyes as he stated, "Meyer had died 50 years ago today but Meyer will be 18 years old forever."

== Television career ==
Hansen began his career in Newton, Iowa as a radio disc jockey and operations manager at KCOB, covering the Newton Cardinals and the Newton Nite Hawks. He then went to Knoxville, Iowa to KNIA radio as News Director. After that he moved to Saint Cloud, Minnesota to KCLD radio. After that he got closer to his hometown of Logan, Iowa by working at a radio station he grew up listening to, KOIL in Omaha, Nebraska. He then took a job as a sports reporter at KMTV also in Omaha. Hansen then took his first job in Dallas at KDFW, which at the time was CBS's Dallas affiliate. He left KDFW and joined WFAA in 1983. Hansen was at 10 pm, and legendary anchor Verne Lundquist was at 6 pm, so WFAA had claimed them to be "Texas' Best Sportcasters."

Hansen made his reputation in 1986 when he and his producer, John Sparks, broke a story about a massive scandal involving payments to players on Southern Methodist University's football team. Hansen's reporting ultimately led to the NCAA canceling the Mustangs' 1987 season—the so-called "death penalty." His reporting of the scandal garnered him a Peabody Award for distinguished journalism, a duPont-Columbia Award, and several death threats.

Hansen became nationally and even internationally famous in recent years when his commentaries on matters such as racism and domestic violence were circulated widely on YouTube. A 2015 profile of Hansen at the now-defunct Grantland website noted that many viewers assumed Hansen was a former conservative, when in fact he has been politically liberal his entire adult life and his views have often clashed with the mostly-conservative Dallas fan base of the Cowboys and Mavericks.

On May 18, 2021, Hansen announced his retirement, effective September 2, 2021.

=== "Thank God for Kids" ===
Since 1983, Hansen has had a segment during "Sports Special" on the Sunday of the week before Christmas. He always shares a story of a child's death in the past year and talks about it before playing a video of clips from the 1980s of children in Dallas. At the end is young Hansen with his own children. The video is played to "Thank God for Kids" by The Oak Ridge Boys. Hansen used the segment in 2011 to admit he was a victim of sexual abuse as a child, in hopes that it would convince others to come forward.

=== Scholar-Athlete of the Week ===
Each week since 1988, Hansen introduces his scholar-athlete of the week, a high school senior or recent high school graduate who excels in sports as well as in the classroom. McDonald's then donates $250 (formerly $100) to the school in honor of the student.

=== Gay players in the NFL ===
In a February 2014 broadcast, Hansen delivered a commentary supporting NFL draft candidate Michael Sam coming out as a gay man. He contrasted Sam's homosexuality making players "uncomfortable", with criminal activity by other NFL players which is routinely condoned, and likened contemporary discomfort with gay players to white athletes' and fans' past discomfort with black players. He concluded saying, "I'm not always comfortable when a man tells me he is gay; I don't understand his world. But I do understand that he is part of mine."

In Hansen's commentary he described as what he saw a double standard within the NFL, stating, "You beat a woman and drag her down a flight of stairs, pulling her hair out by the roots? You're the fourth guy taken in the draft," he said. "Caught with drugs? Kill someone driving drunk? Rape a woman? People are O.K. with that. You love another man?" Hansen said. "Well, now you've gone too far."

The video, posted to YouTube, garnered a large amount of interest on social media. It also received attention from mainstream media, featured by the New York Daily News, CTV News, Newsweek, People magazine, and others.

As a result, Hansen appeared on The Ellen DeGeneres Show on February 14, 2014.

=== #TakeAKnee Protests ===
In September 2017, Donald Trump, then the US president, criticized Colin Kaepernick and other NFL players who took a knee during the national anthem before games to raise awareness for police brutality and racial injustice. Trump spoke at a rally in Alabama, stating, "Wouldn't you love to see one of these NFL owners, when somebody disrespects our flag, to say, 'Get that son of a bitch off the field right now. Out! He's fired. He's fired!' " Hansen took to the air to discuss his latest take on Trump and that week's NFL protests. Hansen mentioned he himself had served in the Vietnam War and that his best friend in high school "did not die so that you can decide who is a patriot and who loves America more." He also stated, "The young, black athletes are not disrespecting America or the military by taking a knee during the anthem. They are respecting the best thing about America. It's a dog whistle to the racists among us to say otherwise."

The video went viral, receiving millions of views on social media. It gained so much widespread attention, prompting The New York Times to profile Hansen. The Times described Hansen as a progressive voice, "talking — in remarkably personal terms" — about sexual abuse, violence against women, racism in sports and gun violence.

== Radio career ==
Hansen started in sports radio at KRLD 1080 AM in 1985 as the Dallas Cowboys color analyst, with Brad Sham as the play-by-play announcer. He served in this role until two games remained in the 1996 NFL season. A heated on-camera argument with coach Barry Switzer during 1994 training camp and subsequent friction between Hansen, Switzer and Dallas Cowboys owner Jerry Jones contributed to the split. Babe Laufenberg took over his spot.

Hansen joined KTCK 1310 AM ("The Ticket") in 1999 as a regular on its Dallas Cowboys post-game report after the games were broadcast on KLUV 98.7 FM. He also hosted a show from noon to 1 pm year-round, every Monday and another one-hour show on Fridays during the NFL season.

In May 2006, Hansen moved to KESN 103.3 FM (ESPN Radio's Dallas affiliate) from The Ticket, just as KTCK was named the new Dallas Cowboys flagship radio station. At KESN, he hosted "The Hour of Hansen" weeknights from 6–7 pm and also contributed to other programming, including the station's Cowboys pre and post-game shows.

== Social media career ==
Hansen has made a number of commentaries on social media. In 2014 he defended Michael Sam in a video. Courtney Collins and Rick Holter of KERA wrote that it "was seen by millions on YouTube".

Since 2025, Hansen has hosted a podcast called Dallas Dialogue with Dale Hansen. It is streamed on all podcast platforms.

== Charity ==
Since 1989, Hansen has been in charge of the Dale Hansen Golf Classic. In 1990, Hansen joined with the Dallas Can! schools. However, he and The Hansen Foundation split from the 16-year partnership, as a result of lawsuits against each side totaling almost $700,000. Starting in 2007–2008, The Hansen Foundation sponsors $100,000 of scholarships for University of North Texas students, with the money coming from the annual Dale Hansen Golf Classic.

== Awards and honors ==
Hansen has won many awards in his career, including:

- Two-time Sportscaster of the Year by the Associated Press
- Four-time Texas Sportscaster of the Year by the National Sportscasters and Sportswriters Association
- Best Sportscaster by the United Press International and Dallas Press Club
- TV Personality of the Year by American Women in Radio and Television
- Best Investigative Reporter by the Iowa Associated Press.
- Communicator of the Year, the National Speech and Debate Association (2019).

In March 2019, Hansen was honored with the Radio Television Digital News Association's Lifetime Achievement Award, joining the likes of past winners Tom Brokaw, Robin Roberts, Bob Simon and Andy Rooney. Hansen stated upon receiving the award, "What we do matters, What we do is too important to give up now."
