= Carnival Queen =

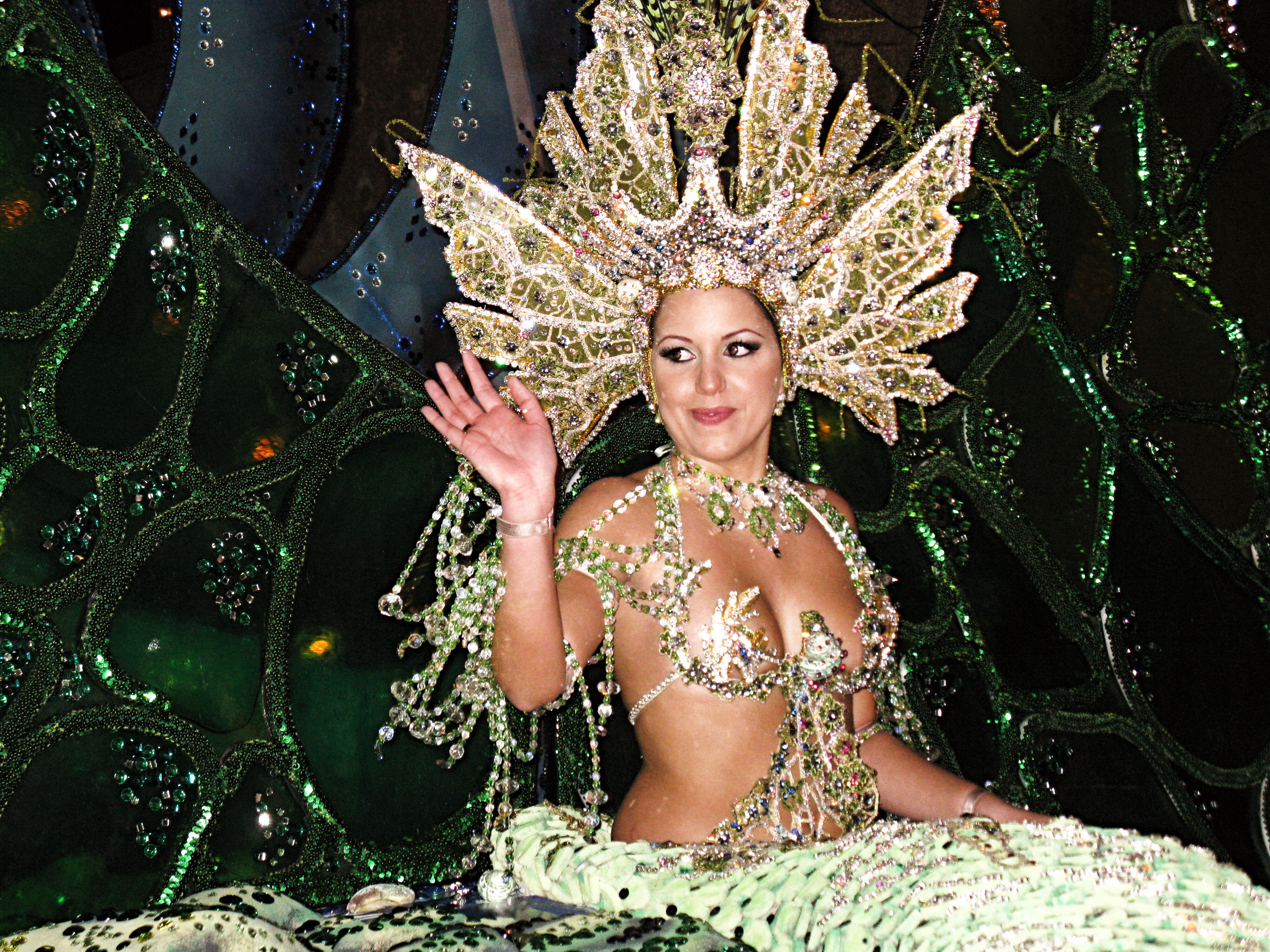
Carnival Queen of Santa Cruz de Tenerife, 2009

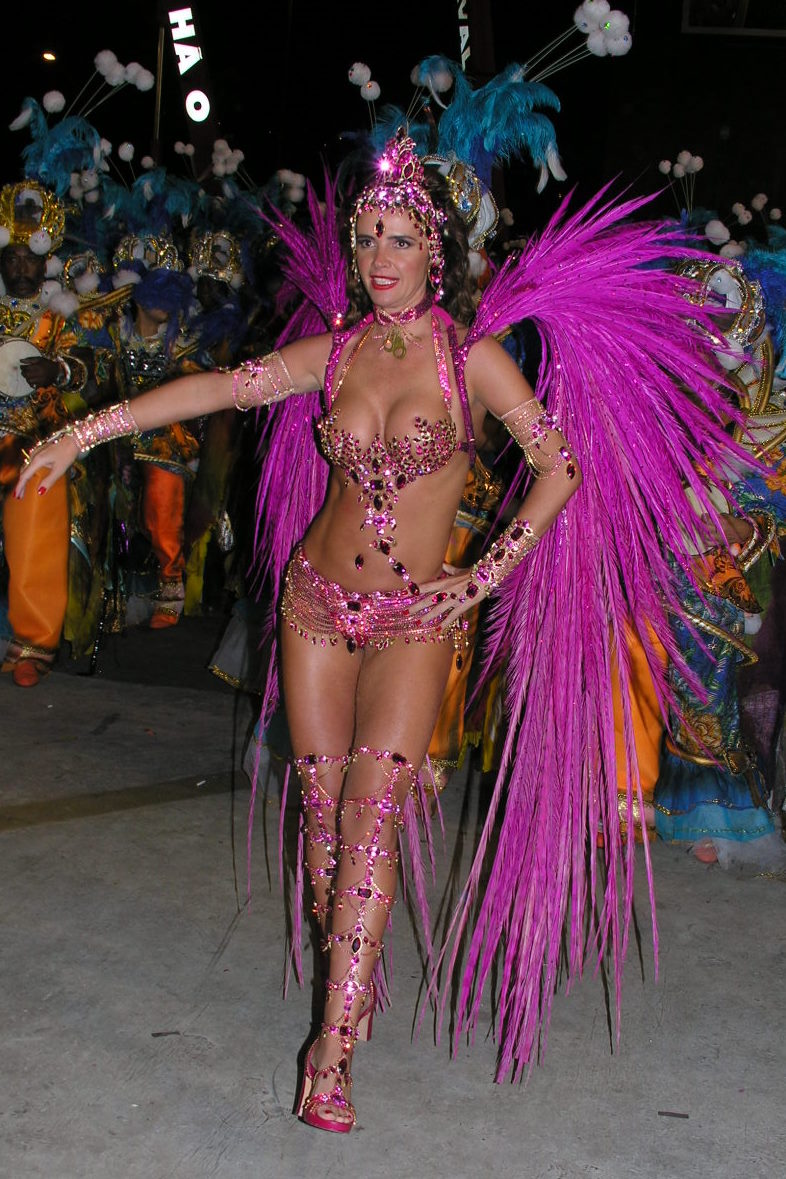
A Brazilian Queen of the Carnival, 2005

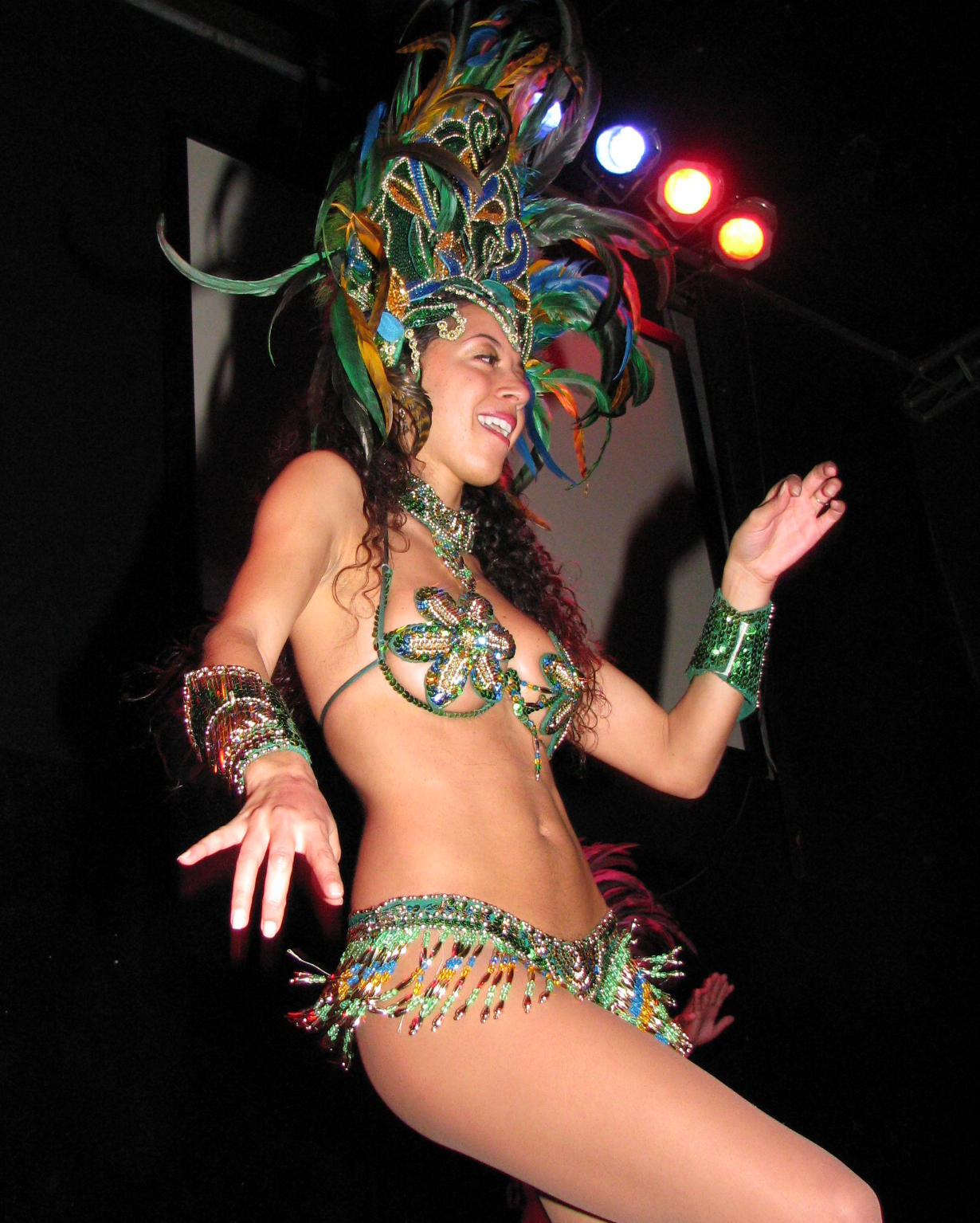
A Carnival Queen from California, United States, 2008

Carnival Queen, or sometimes Carnaval Queen, is the name or title given to a woman or a girl who is chosen to perform official duties during the celebration of the Carnival, a festive season which occurs immediately before Lent wherein the main events are usually held annually in February. The title is also given to a woman or a girl who has won the beauty and talent competition during the Carnival, or a woman who won a beauty and talent contest and thus become the representative during the celebration of the Carnival.

One notable place in Spain that elects a new Carnival Queen every year is Santa Cruz de Tenerife. On the other hand, the Carnival in Tarragona – also in Spain – starts with the building of a huge barrel and the later ends with the burning of that barrel together with the burning of the effigies of the Carnival Queen and the Carnival King, a symbolic ritual that signifies bidding "farewell to the flesh" (literally "to remove meat") by men and women – such as from their diet – before the Lenten season, a form of human renewal, because meat or the "flesh" is prohibited during Lent.

== See also ==
- Rex parade
- King of the Carnival
- Homecoming Queen
