= Frank Glieber =

American sportscaster (1934–1985)

- Born: April 5, 1934; Milwaukee, Wisconsin, U.S.
- Died: May 1, 1985 (aged 51); Dallas, Texas, U.S.
- Education: Northwestern University, 1956
- Occupation: Sportscaster
- Spouse: Kathy Glieber
- Children: 5

Frank John Glieber (April 5, 1934 – May 1, 1985) was an American sportscaster known primarily for his play-by-play commentary on National Football League (NFL) telecasts for CBS Sports. Along the way, he served as a mentor to several athletes and coaches who made the transition to the broadcast booth, a list that included Pittsburgh Steelers defensive tackle Joe Greene, Oakland Raiders head coach John Madden and Philadelphia Eagles head coach Dick Vermeil among others.

== Early life and career ==
Born and raised in Milwaukee, Wisconsin, Glieber was the oldest child of immigrants—John, a native of Austria, and Mary, a native of Germany. He attended Northwestern University, graduating with a bachelor's degree in 1956. Glieber moved to the Dallas area, where he began his career broadcasting local sports events on area radio stations.

Glieber relocated to Cleveland where he was the sports director at WJW-TV from 1966 to 1970. He was also the play-by-play voice with color commentator Warren Lahr on Cleveland Browns telecasts with CBS during the 1966 and 1967 seasons.

Glieber returned to Dallas to serve in a similar capacity with KRLD-AM from 1970 until his death. He called play-by-play of local college basketball and minor league baseball teams and served as a color commentator on Dallas Cowboys broadcasts. From 1978–80, he was a television announcer for the Texas Rangers. Glieber was named Texas Sportscaster of the Year seven times.

== CBS Sports career ==
In 1963, Glieber began a long career with CBS television. Over the next two decades, he broadcast a variety of events for the network including NFL football, NBA and NCAA basketball, professional bowling, tennis, NASL soccer, and golf (including the Masters Tournament each spring). Glieber continued to broadcast local Dallas area sports events during his time at CBS, working as many as sixteen hours a day. He was also a commentator for the World Series of Poker.

== Sudden death ==
Glieber collapsed and died at age 51 of an apparent heart attack while jogging at the Ken Cooper Aerobics Center in Dallas on 1 May 1985. He was transported to Medical City Hospital, where he died during treatment. He was survived by his fourth wife, Kathy, and his five children, Jon, Lynne, Robin, Craig, and Mitchell.

He covered the NFL draft for KRLD two days prior to his death. His final assignment with CBS Sports was Game 1 of the Western Conference semifinal series between the Los Angeles Lakers and Portland Trail Blazers which he called with color commentator James Brown. He had been scheduled to call Game 4 of the series. He was replaced by Verne Lundquist. Tom Brookshier, who previously served as Pat Summerall's color commentator prior to John Madden, replaced Glieber in the NFL on CBS broadcast booth.
