= Brad Sham =

American sportscaster (born 1949)

Brad Michael Sham (born August 16, 1949) is an American sportscaster who is known as the "Voice of the Dallas Cowboys". Sham is currently the play-by-play announcer on the Dallas Cowboys Radio Network.

== Biography ==
Sham has been with the Cowboys since 1976, when he was hired to be their color analyst alongside play-by-play man Verne Lundquist. Sham also held the position of Sports Director at former Cowboys Radio Network flagship station 1080 AM KRLD between 1976 and 1981. When Lundquist left for CBS in 1984, Sham became the lead play-by-play man, a position he has held ever since (save for three seasons in the mid-1990s). In 2003, Sham wrote Dallas Cowboys: Colorful Tales of America's Greatest Teams (ISBN 0762727594). He also contributes weekly columns to dallascowboys.com. The 2026 season marked Sham's 48th year with the organization; the longest of any broadcaster with the team, albeit not consecutive due to his three-year absence from the club from 1995 to 1997. During his absence from the Cowboys, Sham called Texas Rangers games on the radio with Eric Nadel between 1995 and 1997.

Sham has done NFL play-by-play for the NFL on Westwood One, the NFL on Fox, TNT Sunday Night Football, and the NFL on CBS for one game in 2004. He has also worked games for NFL Europe and the Arena Football League's Dallas Desperados. Sham has extensive experience broadcasting collegiate sports, having done play-by-play for NCAA athletics, most notably the NCAA Men's Division I Basketball Championship and college football. He spent over a decade as the radio voice of the Texas Longhorns' football and basketball teams (mostly in the 1980s), which also aired on flagship KRLD and on the Mutual Southwest Radio Network. Sham has been in the booth for 26 Cotton Bowl Classics, calling play-by-play for 25 games and serving as the analyst for one. He has also served as a play-by-play broadcaster for the Big 12 Network basketball Saturdays, as well as for select ESPN Network Big 12 games.

Sham has also worked Major League Soccer games for the Dallas Burn (now FC Dallas) and North American Soccer League games for the Dallas Tornado. He also provided color commentary for ESPN's coverage of the NASL in 1982. He also was part of the crew that covered the 1998 Winter Olympics in Nagano, Japan.

Sham made his acting debut in the 2008 movie, W.

=== Honors ===
Sham has won the NSSA Texas Sportscaster of the Year award 11 times and is a member of the Texas Radio Hall of Fame. He was inducted into the Texas Sports Hall of Fame in 2020.

== Personal life ==
Sham is Jewish. Cory Provus, broadcaster for the Minnesota Twins, is his cousin. He graduated from the University of Missouri School of Journalism in 1970. He was a brother of the Alpha Epsilon Pi fraternity. In the 1980s he owned a sporting apparel store named Brad Sham's Big League Threads.
