= Verne Lundquist =

American sportscaster (born 1940)

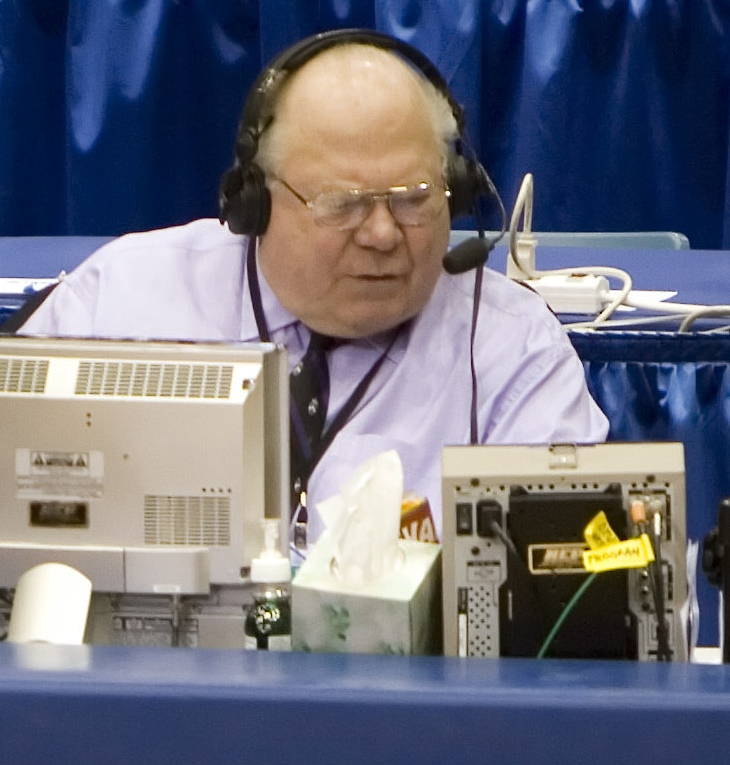
- Lundquist at the 2009 NCAA tournament
- Born: Merton Laverne Lundquist Jr. July 17, 1940 (age 86); Duluth, Minnesota, U.S.
- Other name: The Golden Throat
- Occupations: Sportscaster; journalist
- Years active: 1967−2024
- Sports commentary career
- Genre: Play-by-play
- Sports: American football; basketball; golf

Merton Laverne Lundquist Jr. (born July 17, 1940) is an American former sportscaster known for his long career with CBS Sports.

== Early life ==
Lundquist was born in Duluth, Minnesota. He graduated from Austin High School in Austin, Texas, before attending Texas Lutheran University (formerly Texas Lutheran College), where he was one of the founders of the Omega Tau Fraternity in 1958 before graduating in 1962. He is a former member of the Board of Regents for his alma mater.

Lundquist attended Augustana Seminary in Rock Island, Illinois, in 1962. His father was a Lutheran pastor and President of the Texas Synod of the Augustana Lutheran Church. Lundquist was a disc jockey at WOC, Davenport, Iowa. His 'Golden Voice' was the highlight of the seminary class on preaching.

== Career ==
He began his broadcasting career as sports anchor in Austin for KTBC, moved from there to WFAA in Dallas where he also became the radio voice of the Dallas Cowboys. Lundquist joined the Cowboys Radio Network in 1967 and remained with the team until the 1984 season. He was paired with future (and now current) play-by-play man Brad Sham starting with the 1977 season, the year Dallas went 12–2 and captured their second NFL title in Super Bowl XII. He was sportscaster at WFAA during their 6pm news, while his eventual successor Dale Hansen did the 10pm news.

Before becoming a nationwide sports commentator, from 1970 to 1974, Lundquist was announcer for the sports show, Bowling for Dollars, in Dallas, Texas. It aired weekday evenings on the ABC station, WFAA-TV, from 6:30 to 7:00, in north central Texas. During these four seasons, Lundquist started interviewing Cowboys players and their first head coach, Tom Landry, at their sidelines, during halftimes, practices, pre-season and pre-game warm-ups in Dallas.

=== Network assignments ===
Nationally, Lundquist worked for ABC Sports from 1974 to 1981, CBS from 1982 to 1995 and TNT cable from 1995 to 1997 before returning to CBS in 1998. Lundquist became known for his distinctive broadcasting style, including his characteristic laugh and his enthusiastic play-by-play commentary.

Lundquist is among the key voices of NFL Films and in past years had called regional NFL games for CBS, NBA games for CBS and TNT and TNT's Sunday Night Football telecasts. He called television play-by-play on Seattle Seahawks preseason games from 2006 to 2008.

During the 1992, 1994 and 1998 Winter Olympics, whose rights were held by CBS and TNT, Lundquist and Scott Hamilton served as the announcers for figure skating events. Their performances were parodied by Saturday Night Live cast members Phil Hartman and Darrell Hammond (as Lundquist) with Dana Carvey, David Spade and Will Ferrell (both as Hamilton): in 1992 with Jason Priestley and 1994 with Nancy Kerrigan and Chris Farley. They did a spoof of the Olympics figure skating events as both Hartman and Myers went "Oh!" when Priestly or Farley (in a pre-recorded performance) did an on-ice pratfall. Lundquist, after seeing the original footage in 1992, commented that Hartman "nailed it dead on."

Lundquist filled in for Ernie Johnson Jr. as host of TNT's coverage of the PGA Championship twice, in 2006 as Johnson was battling cancer and in 2011 when Johnson left after the second round following the death of his father on that Friday night.

After his return to CBS, Lundquist served as the long-time lead play-by-play announcer for CBS Sports' coverage of college football on the SEC on CBS from 2000 to 2016.

Lundquist retired from broadcasting college football games after calling the Army–Navy Game on December 10, 2016. He planned to contribute to other CBS Sports programs, including its college basketball and golf coverage, for the foreseeable future.

In March 2018, Lundquist announced he would not work the 2018 NCAA men's basketball tournament and would retire from calling college basketball.

Despite his retirement from announcing college football and basketball, Lundquist remained active as a commentator, continuing to call golf for CBS Sports. Lundquist continued calling the PGA Championship for CBS through 2021, and the Masters Tournament through 2024.

On February 14, 2024, CBS announced that the 2024 Masters would be Lundquist's final broadcast, marking his 40th year covering the event for CBS.

Currently, Lundquist resides in Steamboat Springs, Colorado.

=== Appearances in other media ===
Lundquist played himself commentating on golf tournaments in the 1996 motion picture Happy Gilmore, later reprising the role in the 2025 sequel, Happy Gilmore 2.

Lundquist was a play-by-play announcer in the NBA Live 98 video game and was also the play-by-play announcer in the College Hoops 2K8 video game.

A photo of Lundquist shaking hands with Tiger Woods at the Masters became a viral online meme in 2024.

=== Memorable calls ===
A famous pet phrase Lundquist used on occasion is "How do you DO!"; on a huge offensive or defensive play, a phrase he took from USC football broadcaster Pete Arbogast (who in turn took the phrase from venerable broadcaster Vin Scully).

- January 21, 1979: While calling the Dallas Cowboys' radio broadcast of Super Bowl XIII against the Pittsburgh Steelers, Lundquist famously described Cowboys tight end Jackie Smith dropping a third quarter touchdown pass, which would have put the Cowboys an extra point away from tying the game:

Bless his heart, he's got to be the sickest man in America!

- April 13, 1986: While calling the final round of the 50th Masters Tournament in 1986, Jack Nicklaus made a birdie putt on the 17th hole for the outright lead:

Maybe...YES, SIR!

- March 28, 1992: While calling play-by-play for the 1992 NCAA Men's Basketball East Region Finals between Kentucky and Duke, Christian Laettner hit a 17-foot turnaround jumper at the buzzer to win the game by a score of 104–103 in overtime:

There's the pass to Laettner...puts it up...YES!!!

- February 25, 1994: While calling figure skating at the Winter Olympics, Lundquist called one of the most watched sports events in history. The ladies free skate portion of the 1994 Olympics drew Super Bowl type television ratings because of the hyped Tonya Harding and Nancy Kerrigan debacle. The drama unfolded that evening as Harding began her free skate, then quit 45 seconds into her program, and went crying to the judges table with a broken skate lace. She was granted permission to fix her skate and start her free skate later in the evening. During the ordeal, he said:

Well, this bizarre real life movie continues.

- April 10, 2005: While calling the final round of the 2005 Masters Tournament on CBS, Tiger Woods sunk a dramatic chip-in birdie on the 16th hole:

Here it comes...Oh, my goodness!...OH, WOW!! IN YOUR LIFE, have you seen anything like that?

- March 26, 2006: While calling play-by-play for the 2006 NCAA Men's Basketball Washington, D.C. Regional Finals, a stunning upset was crafted by #11-seed George Mason over #1-seed Connecticut in the Elite 8. Lundquist announced, archived on YouTube:

By George, the dream is alive!

- November 11, 2006: While calling a college football game on CBS between the #6-ranked Florida Gators and the unranked South Carolina Gamecocks, Florida defensive end Jarvis Moss blocked a game-winning 48-yard field goal attempt by South Carolina kicker Ryan Succop. The Gators would go on to win the national championship:

Blocked! It is blocked! Jarvis Moss...AGAIN!

- November 10, 2012: While calling the college football game on CBS between the #1-ranked Alabama Crimson Tide and the #15-ranked Texas A&M Aggies, A&M quarterback Johnny Manziel threw a touchdown pass to receiver Ryan Swope after nearly getting sacked and fumbling the football, all but cementing Manziel's Heisman Trophy that year.

Snap from Patrick Lewis … 4-man Alabama rush … got him … no, they didn't. Oh, my GRACIOUS! HOW ABOUT THAT!?

- November 16, 2013: While calling a college football rivalry game on CBS between #7-ranked Auburn and #25-ranked Georgia, Auburn quarterback Nick Marshall threw a 73-yard touchdown pass to Ricardo Louis known as "The Prayer at Jordan–Hare," a Hail Mary pass that propelled Auburn past Georgia in the final seconds of the game. Lundquist's call included, as seen on YouTube:

Fourth-and-18 … lets it GO … OH MY GOSH! OH MY GOSH! OH NO! Ricardo Louis! Talk about a Hail Mary.

- November 30, 2013: While calling a college football game on CBS between #1-ranked Alabama and #4-ranked Auburn, a fierce in-state rivalry known as "The Iron Bowl," Auburn cornerback Chris Davis returned a missed 57-yard field goal attempt by Alabama placekicker Adam Griffith with 0:01 remaining 100 yards for a game-winning touchdown on the game's final play. Known as the Kick Six, the play gave Auburn a 34–28 victory and a spot in the 2013 SEC Championship Game. Lundquist described the play, available on YouTube:

On the way … No, returned by Chris Davis. Davis goes left. Davis gets a block. Davis has another block! Chris Davis! No flags! Touchdown, Auburn! An answered prayer!

- October 1, 2016: While calling a college football rivalry game on CBS between #11-ranked Tennessee and #25-ranked Georgia at Sanford Stadium, Tennessee quarterback Joshua Dobbs completed a Hail Mary pass to wide receiver Jauan Jennings with no time remaining in regulation play to give Tennessee a 34–31 victory, only 10 clock seconds after Georgia had scored a 47-yard touchdown to secure the lead and presumably the win:

Dobbs heaves it. They're bunched up in the end zone. It's tipped up. It's caught! It is caught! Jauan Jennings! Jauan Jennings!

- April 14, 2019: While calling the 16th hole at the 2019 Masters Tournament, where Tiger Woods hit a remarkable tee shot and made a birdie to increase his lead in the final round. Woods would go on to win the tournament (his first win at Augusta in 14 years) capping an amazing comeback to the top of the golfing world:

Tiger Woods can increase his lead to 2, with 2 holes to play...I am compelled to say, Oh my goodness.

- May 23, 2021: While calling the 5th hole in the final round of the 2021 PGA Championship, where Phil Mickelson electrified the crowd by holing a bunker shot for birdie on his way to becoming the oldest major champion in golf history:

Well well! Oh my GRACIOUS!

- April 14, 2024: While signing off from CBS for the final time after calling the 16th hole at the 2024 Masters Tournament, his 40th Masters broadcast:

It's my honor, my privilege.

=== Honors ===
At the 2005 Sun Bowl, Lundquist was inducted into the Sun Bowl Hall of Fame along with former UCLA Bruins football coach Terry Donahue.

From 1977 to 1983, the National Sportscasters and Sportswriters Association named Lundquist as Texas Sportscaster of the Year for his accomplishments from his time in Dallas. The organization later inducted him into its Hall of Fame in 2007.

In broadcasting circles, Lundquist is affectionately known as "The Golden Throat".

In May 2012, Lundquist delivered the commencement address at Hampden–Sydney College, an honor he calls "one of the true achievements of my lifetime."

Lundquist is on the board of directors of the summer music festival, Strings Music Festival in Steamboat Springs, Colorado.

On October 22, 2016, Lundquist was a Celebrity Guest Picker on College GameDay on ESPN.

== Broadcasting partners ==
Lundquist has had many broadcasting partners over his long career, including:

- Greg Anthony
- Jill Arrington
- Todd Blackledge
- Terry Bradshaw
- Frank Broyles
- Randy Cross
- Gary Danielson
- Steve Davis
- Dan Dierdorf
- David Feherty
- Dan Fouts
- Frank Glieber
- Lee Grosscup
- Pat Haden
- Scott Hamilton
- Tommy Heinsohn
- Clark Kellogg
- Allie LaForce
- John Madden
- Gary McCord
- Brent Musburger
- Jim Nantz
- Billy Packer
- Bill Raftery
- Brad Sham
- Jim Spanarkel
- Pat Summerall
- Lesley Visser
- Charlie Waters
- Tracy Wolfson
