= 1979 San Antonio parade shooting =

Mass shooting in Texas, US

- San Antonio (Texas)
- Location: 29.4435°N 98.4764°W; San Antonio, Texas, US
- Date: April 27, 1979
- Attack type: Mass shooting, murder-suicide, shootout
- Weapons: Colt AR-15 semi-automatic rifle; 12-gauge shotgun; .38-caliber Smith & Wesson revolver; Several other unidentified and unused firearms
- Deaths: 3 (including the perpetrator)
- Injuries: 55
- Perpetrator: Ira Attebury

On April 27, 1979, 64-year-old Ira Attebury opened fire on spectators at the Battle of Flowers parade in San Antonio, Texas, United States. The attack killed two people and injured dozens of others, including six police officers. The shooting led to a siege lasting over an hour, which ended when Attebury committed suicide. A veteran of World War II, Attebury was under the influence of drugs during the shooting and reportedly believed he was being persecuted by the police.

On the 40th anniversary of the shooting, KSAT described it as the worst mass shooting in San Antonio history.

== Shooting ==
On April 27, 1979, Attebury parked his RV on the corner of Broadway and Grayson Street. The vehicle contained a cache of weapons and ammunition, including 14 firearms. From within the RV, Attebury opened fire on the crowd as the Battle of Flowers Parade was beginning.

One witness described Attebury as shooting "at anything that moved" for approximately 30 minutes while shouting, "traitors, traitors, traitors!". The incident escalated into a 90-minute standoff with police and a SWAT team, during which Attebury was wounded by police gunfire. After his AR-15 rifle jammed, Attebury committed suicide with a revolver.

== Victims ==
In total, two people were killed in the shooting and 55 were injured; six of the injured were police officers. At least thirty of those hurt in the incident had been shot, while the others were injured while trying to escape.

== Perpetrator ==
Ira Attebury (Note: Sometimes spelled Attebery) (April 29, 1914 – April 27, 1979) had grown up on a farm in Poplar Bluff, Missouri, one of nine children. After service in the US Coast Guard during World War II, Attebury had been an independent trucker. Eight years prior to the shooting, he had been involved in an accident that killed two people, and as a result had been disabled. He was not responsible for the crash, but according to his brothers began to believe he was being persecuted by the police in the aftermath.

His brother described him as "highstrong" and "temperamental", fighting with their father and dropping out of high school in his youth. He was receiving disability pension payments for an unrelated heart condition. Attebury had lived in San Antonio for more than a year, having appeared at a local trailer park. He was later kicked out of the trailer park due to his paranoid behavior.

Attebury was high on PCP during the shooting, and his colleagues stated he would have hallucinations and thought he was being persecuted by law enforcement. He additionally complained about banks and what he perceived as unfair treatment from the Department of Veterans Affairs. His landlord stated he was a "quiet loner" who would always pay in cash due to his fear of banks. Attebury's neighbors expressed surprise after the shooting, not thinking his statements were serious.

== Aftermath ==
After the shooting, there were calls for improved police resources, and a surviving victim of the shooting sued to collect funds from Attebury's estate. In 2016 a responding officer noted the police response as "unexpected, unplanned and unrehearsed". On the 40th anniversary of the shooting, KSAT described it as the worst mass shooting in San Antonio history. Following the shooting, Attebury was nicknamed by San Antonio residents as "the Fiesta sniper".

In his 2012 book The Anatomy of Motive, writer and former FBI profiler John E. Douglas compared Attebury to Charles Whitman, classing both of them as representing the "paranoid assassin personality", and speculated that he had targeted a crowd due to his lack of a "cause" motivating the shooting, only his own rage. He also said that Attebury's lack of work combined with his paranoid personality resulted in the circumstances that led to the shooting.

Attebury was buried in his hometown on May 1, 1979.
