= Fiesta San Antonio =

Annual festival held in April in San Antonio, Texas

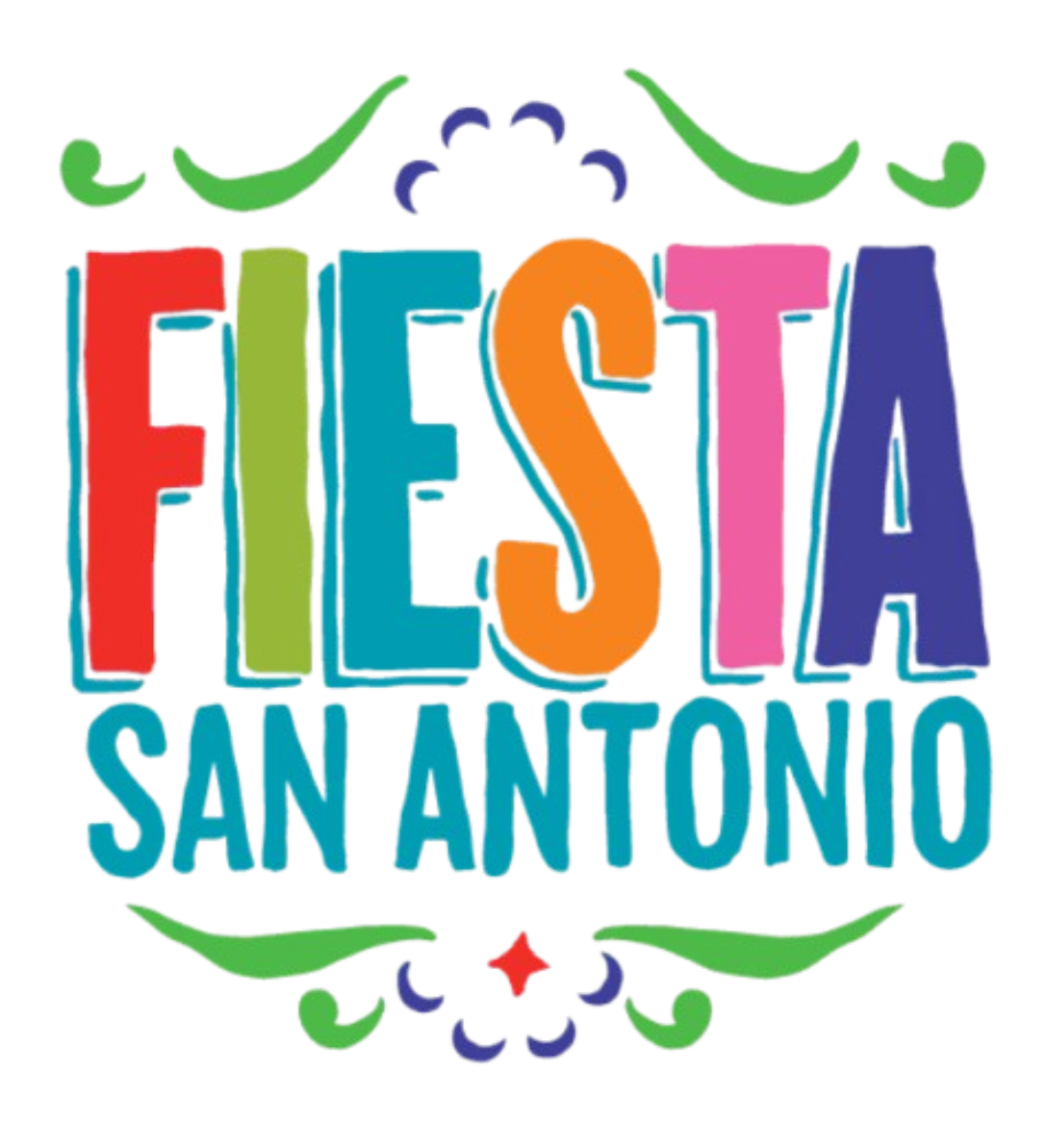

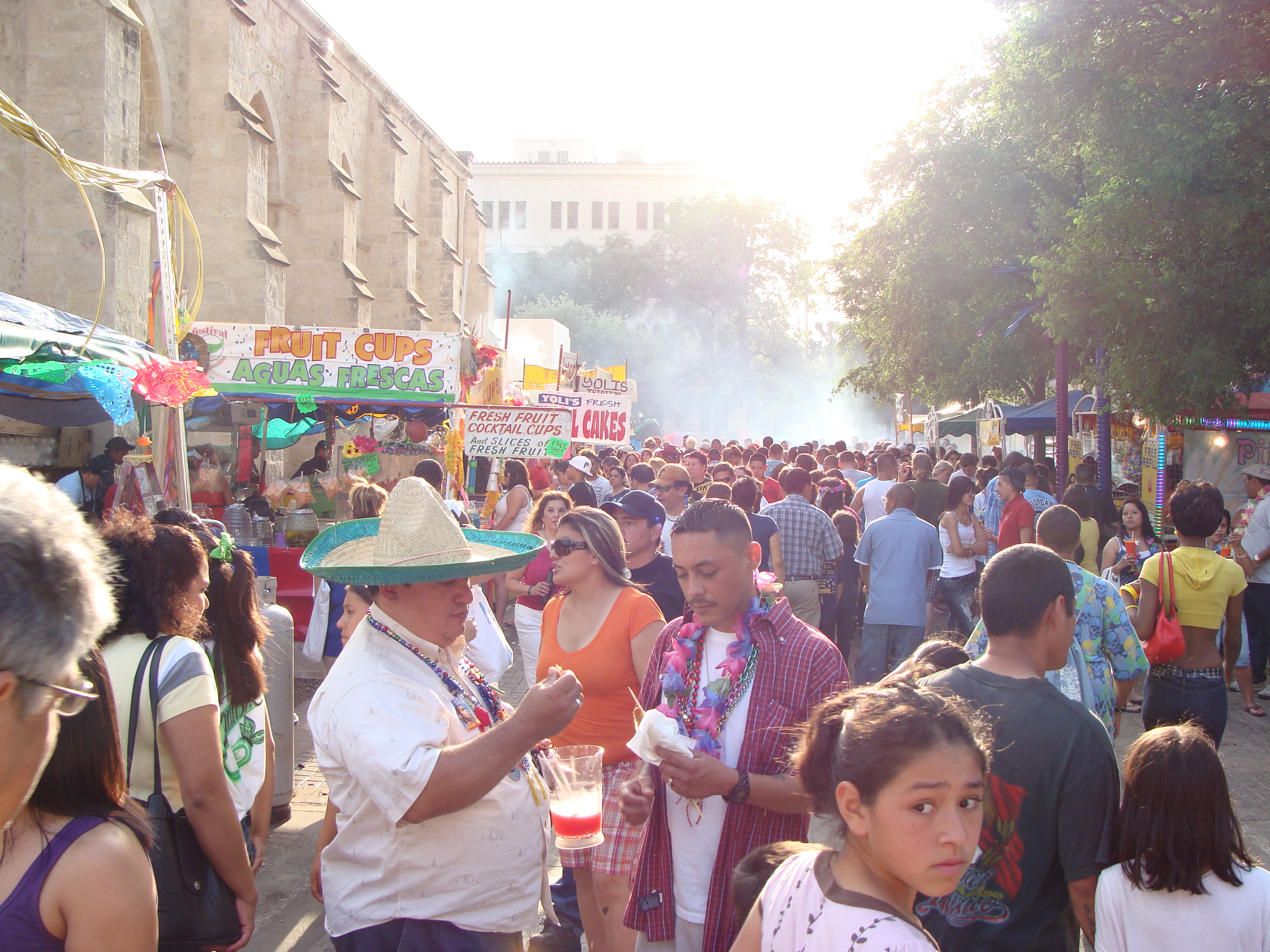
- Event at Fiesta 2009
- Genre: Festival
- Frequency: Annually
- Locations: Greater San Antonio, Texas
- Years active: 1891 - present
- Most recent: April 16 - 26, 2026
- Next event: April 15 - 25, 2027
- Attendance: 2.51 million
- Website: fiestasanantonio.org

Fiesta San Antonio (or simply Fiesta) has been since its 1891 inception an annual festival held in April in San Antonio, Texas. It is the city's signature event, along with some events held in the neighboring cities (Boerne, Schertz, Windcrest, Balcones Heights, and Alamo Heights). The festival, also known as the Battle of Flowers, commemorates the Battle of the Alamo, which took place in San Antonio, and the Battle of San Jacinto, which led to Texas' independence from Mexico in April 1836.

Fiesta is the city's biggest festival, with an economic impact of $340 million for the city. More than three million people take part, in more than 100 events that take place all over the city and beyond.

== History ==
The festival began in 1891, when local women decorated carriages, baby buggies, and bicycles with live flowers and threw flowers at one another, thus inspiring the name "Battle of Flowers." Soon, other activities were added to the flower parade, including balls, parties and a carnival. The celebration's name changed over the years from Carnival to Spring Carnival to Fiesta San Jacinto and, in 1960, to Fiesta San Antonio.

The Battle of Flowers Parade Association began crowning a Carnival Queen in 1895. In 1909, local businessman John Carrington established The Order of the Alamo with the purpose of crowning a queen, a princess and 24 duchesses — 12 from San Antonio and 12 from out of town. Coronations of local "royalty", a carnival and other activities became the forerunners of today's fiesta.

On April 27, 1979, a mass shooting occurred at the Battle of Flowers parade. The attack killed two people and injured dozens of others, including six police officers. The shooting led to a siege lasting over an hour, which ended when the gunman committed suicide. On the 40th anniversary of the shooting, KSAT-TV described it as the worst mass shooting in San Antonio history.

In 2016, Fiesta celebrated its 125th birthday with special events and ceremony.

From 1989 to 2002 and in later years as an alternate, the San Antonio Spurs used a "fiesta logo" in tribute to the Fiesta.

== Events ==
Today, more than 100 local nonprofit groups, members of the Fiesta San Antonio Commission, stage more than 100 events over 17 days with the help of some 75,000 volunteers.

Fiesta events include three major parades—two along Broadway and past the Alamo, and a boat parade at the San Antonio River Walk (where the "floats" actually float).

Louisiana cuisine is sold at "A Taste of New Orleans" in Brackenridge Park, and oysters and other foods are offered at St. Mary's University's Fiesta Oyster Bake. There are music (six performance stages) and cultural events, lasting two days.

A Night in Old San Antonio (NIOSA) is a four-evening block party at La Villita downtown.

Fiesta in Blue is another annual event, featuring the USAF Band of the West. Two evenings of concerts are put on in downtown San Antonio featuring classical, jazz, and rock/popular music.

Music offered includes Tejano, jazz, mariachi, rock, big band, classical, and pop. History events are held at the Pilgrimage to the Alamo or This Hallowed Ground. Sporting events include races, soccer, rugby, and lacrosse.

Cornyation, a satirical musical and comedy review for adults, was first staged by theatrical director Joe Salek in 1951. This mockery of solemn Fiesta coronations was inspired when he witnessed the coronation of the Order of the Alamo's Queen in 1950. After a wardrobe malfunction caused its cancellation for several years, it was revived in 1982.

Residents and visitors can get souvenir pins and medals from various dignitaries, organizations, and from Fiesta royalty.

== Battle of Flowers and Fiesta Flambeau parades ==
The Battle of Flowers Parade is the oldest Fiesta event and is organized entirely by women. The parade attracts crowds of more than 350,000 on the second Friday of Fiesta. It is the only major parade in the U.S. conceived and produced entirely by women, all of whom are volunteers. The women, dressed in yellow on parade day and wearing yellow hats, direct operations with the assistance of the Army National Guard. Several school districts within San Antonio treat the day of the Battle of Flowers as a local holiday and consequently don't hold classes.

The Fiesta Flambeau Parade starts at sunset on the second Saturday of the festival. Dating from 1948, the parade is illuminated by thousands of lights on the dancers, the band instruments, the horses, the cars, and the floats. An estimated crowd of 600,000 filled the parade route in 2011 to watch the Fiesta Flambeau Parade.

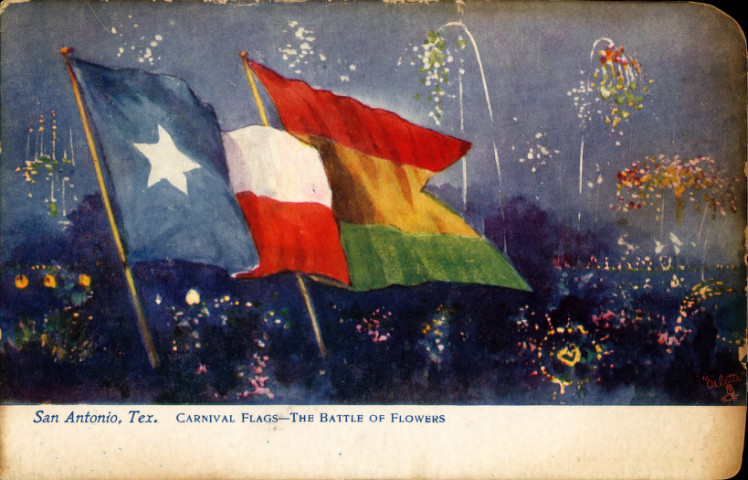
Carnival Flags—The Battle of Flowers, San Antonio (postcard, circa 1907–1911)

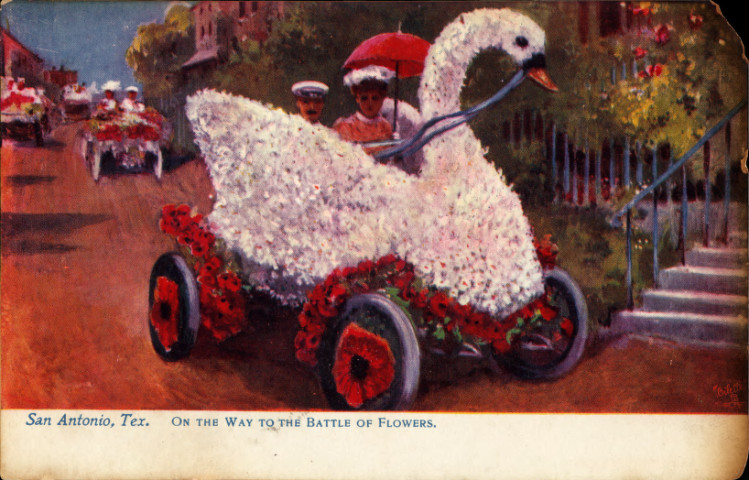
On the way to the Battle of Flowers (postcard, circa 1907–1911)

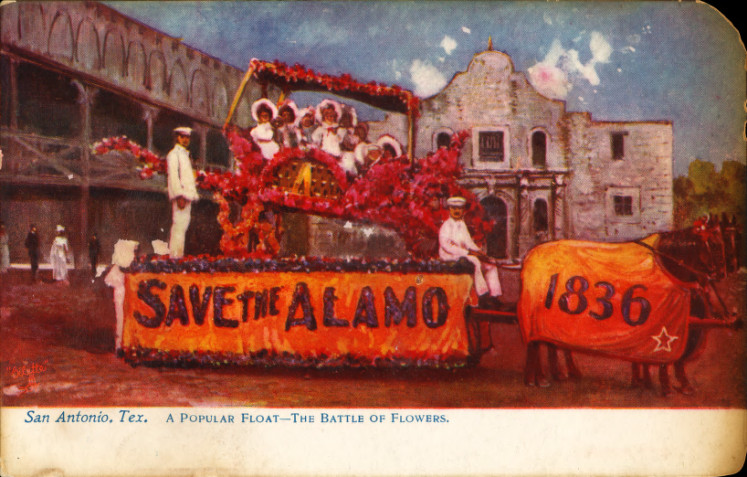
Popular float in the Battle of Flowers, San Antonio, Texas (postcard, circa 1907–1911)

== Criticism of Fiesta ==
Art historian Ruben C. Cordova documents the deeply racist remarks made by central figures in the Texian revolt against Mexico, and questions why the victory over Mexico is celebrated with Mexican music, food and drink. In their place, he sardonically suggests some unappetizing Anglo-Celtic foodstuffs and "Riverdancing on the Riverwalk" to the tune of bagpipes and banjoes.

Fiesta has also been criticized for the racially exclusionary membership of the most elite organizations associated with Fiesta. The Order of the Alamo and the Texas Cavaliers hold rituals in the Alamo church and crown royalty from their own membership, "who preside over brown subjects." Lilliana Saldaña, associate professor of bicultural-bilingual studies at the University of Texas at San Antonio, points out: "Anglo elite place themselves as sort of cultural guardians of the city of San Antonio, which is why they have this fake monarchy, and they have pseudo military." She concludes that Fiesta "does celebrate white supremacy." Writer and producer John Phillip Santos, who characterizes the annual visits made by King Antonio (crowned by the Cavaliers) to his childhood schools as "ostentatious," "distant," and "aggressive," says Fiesta rituals did not include the Mexican American community. Artist Mel Casas (1929-2014) mocked Fiesta queens in a large painting made in 1969 called Humanscape #58 (San Antonio Circus). Cordova proposes a change of date and a "decoupling" of Fiesta from commemorations of battles: "Keep the party, lose the war." In another article, he has identified further inequities and proposed changes to make the festival more equitable. Laura Hernández-Ehrisman, author of "Inventing the Fiesta City: Heritage and Carnival in San Antonio," says Fiesta will be divisive as long as it is connected to the Texas Revolution. Several people interviewed by Madalyn Mendoza underscore the importance of severing Fiesta from the war it was invented to commemorate.

== Oversight ==
Overseeing the festival is a single nonprofit organization, the Fiesta San Antonio Commission. The sponsoring organizations must meet the commission's criteria before receiving approval and being invited to join.

The commission is governed by an all-volunteer board of community leaders and representatives from its nonprofit participating member organizations. The group works throughout the year, coordinating the details and day-to-day tasks required to plan the citywide event. The commission also serves as a liaison between its nonprofit members, the local military activities, and the City of San Antonio. City services are essential to the conduct of Fiesta.

The commission receives no government funding. Its income comes from corporate partnerships, sales in the Fiesta Store, membership dues, and proceeds from the Fiesta Carnival.

== Future Fiesta dates ==
April 24-May 4, 2025, April 16–26, 2026, April 15–25, 2027, April 20–30, 2028.
