= Mass media in San Antonio =

This is a list of media outlets in San Antonio, Texas.

== Television stations ==
San Antonio is currently ranked as the 31st largest market by Nielsen. Despite the relatively large size of both the city proper and the metropolitan area, San Antonio has always been a medium-sized market. This is mainly because the nearby suburban and rural areas are not much larger than the city itself. By comparison, the other two Texas cities with populations of over a million people, Houston and Dallas, are among the 10 largest markets.

Below are a list of TV channels and their subchannels for the market:

Frequency	Callsign	Network	Subchannels	Website
2.1	KCWX (Cable 4)	MyNetworkTV	This TV on 2.2, Bounce on 2.3, Catchy Comedy on 2.4, Quili on 2.5	
4.1	WOAI (Cable 3)	NBC	The CW on 4.2, Antenna TV on 4.3, Charge! on 4.4	
5.1	KENS (Cable 5)	CBS	Estrella TV on 5.2, True Crime Network on 5.3, Quest on 5.4, Circle on 5.5, Twist on 5.6	
9.1	KLRN (Cable 10)	PBS	World on 9.2, PBS Kids on 9.3, Create on 9.4	
12.1	KSAT (Cable 13)	ABC	MeTV on 12.2, Movies! on 12.3, Heroes & Icons on 12.4, Start TV on 12.5, QVC on 12.6, QVC2 on 12.7	
17.1	KNIC (Cable 19)	UniMás	KWEX (Univision on 17.2, Ion Mystery on 17.3, Laff on 17.4, Digi Tv on 17.5	
23.1	KHCE-TV (Cable 22)	Trinity Broadcasting Network	TBN Inspire on 23.2, Smile on 23.3, Enlace on 23.4, Positiv on 23.5	
26.1	KPXL-TV (Cable 2)	Ion Television	Court TV on 26.2, Laff on 26.3, Ion Mystery on 26.4, Defy TV on 26.5, TrueReal on 26.6, Newsy on 26.7	
28.1	KYVV (Cable 16)	Grit	Buzzr on 28.2, Majestad TV on 28.3, LATV on 28.4	
29.1	KABB (Cable 11)	Fox	Comet on 29.2, Rewind TV on 29.3	
35.1	KMYS (Cable 7)	Roar	TBD on 35.2, Stadium on 35.3	
41.1	KWEX-DT (Cable 8)	Univision	GetTV on 41.2, Grit on 41.3	
60.1	KVDA (Cable 17)	Telemundo	TeleXitos on 60.2, Cozi TV on 60.3, NBC Lx on 60.4	

== Radio ==
San Antonio, Texas is the 25th largest radio market in the US as ranked by Nielsen Audio (formerly Arbitron). The following is a list of radio stations serving the San Antonio area.

=== AM Radio ===
Frequency	Callsign	Nickname	Format	Owner	Website
550	KTSA	AM 550	News/Talk	Alpha Media	
630	KSLR	The Word	Religious	Salem Media Group	
680	KKYX	Country Legends	Classic Country	Cox Radio Inc.	
720	KSAH	Norteño 720	Regional Mexican	Alpha Media	
760	KTKR	760 The Ticket	Sports	iHeartMedia	
810	KYTY	Star 810	Contemporary Christian	Maranatha Broadcasting	
860	KONO	Business 860	News/Talk	Cox Radio Inc.	
930	KLUP	930 The Answer	Talk	Salem Media Group	
1000	KBIB	-	Spanish Religious	Hispanic Community College	
1100	KDRY	AM 1100	Religious	KDRY Radio Inc.	
1160	KRDY	Relevant Radio	Christian Talk	Relevant Radio, Inc.	
1200	WOAI	News Radio	News/Talk	iHeartMedia	
1250	KZDC	ESPN Radio	Sports	Alpha Media	
1310	KAHL	Call 1310	Talk/Adult Standards	San Antonio Radio Works	
1350	KXTN	Tejano 1350 AM	Tejano	Uforia Audio Network	
1380	KWMF	-	Spanish Religious	La Promesa Foundation	
1420	KGNB	AM 1420	News/Talk, Country	New Braunfels Communications Inc.	
1480	KCHL	Gospel 1480	Urban Gospel	Darrell E. Martin	
1540	KEDA	Jalapeño Radio 1540	Tejano	D & E Broadcasting Co.	
1580	KWED	KWED AM 1580	Country/Talk	Seguin, Texas	

=== FM Radio ===
Frequency	Callsign	Nickname	Format	Owner	Web site
88.3	KPAC	-	Classical	Texas Public Radio	
89.1	KSTX	NPR	News/Talk	Texas Public Radio	
89.7	KJMA	-	Country/Southern Gospel	Wilson County Educational Foundation	
90.1	KSYM	-	Variety	San Antonio College	
90.9	KYFS	BBN	Religious	Bible Broadcasting Network	
91.3	KZLV	K-LOVE Positive & Encouraging	Contemporary Christian	Educational Media Foundation	
91.7	KRTU-FM	-	Jazz and Indie rock	Trinity University	
92.1	KNBT	Radio New Braunfels	Country/Americana	New Braunfels Communications Inc.	
92.5	KRPT	92.5 & 93.3 The Bull	Classic Country	iHeartMedia	
92.9	KROM	Que Buena	Regional Mexican	Uforia Audio Network	
94.1	KTFM	San Antonio's Sports Star: ESPN 94.1 FM	Sports	Alpha Media	
95.1	KMYO	Amor 95.1	Spanish AC	Uforia Audio Network	
95.7	KLEY-FM	Tejano 95.7 & 103.3	Tejano	Alpha Media	
96.1	KXXM	Mix 96.1	Contemporary Hits/Top-40	iHeartMedia	
97.3	KAJA	KJ-97	Country	iHeartMedia	
97.7	KZAR	Air 1	Contemporary Christian	Educational Media Foundation	
98.5	KBBT	98.5 The Beat	Rhythmic Contemporary Hits/Hip Hop	Uforia Audio Network	
99.5	KISS-FM	99-5 KISS	Rock	Cox Radio Inc.	
100.3	KCYY	Y-100	Country	Cox Radio Inc.	
101.1	KONO-FM	KONO 101.1	Classic Hits	Cox Radio Inc.	
101.9	KQXT-FM	Q 101.9	Soft Adult Contemporary	iHeartMedia	
102.7	KJXK	102.7 Bob FM	Variety Hits	Alpha Media	
104.1	KSAH-FM	Norteño 104.1	Regional Mexican	Alpha Media	
104.5	KZEP-FM	Latino Hits 104.5	Latin Pop/Reggaeton	iHeartMedia	
105.3	KSMG	Hits 105.3	Hot Adult Contemporary/Adult Hit Music	Cox Radio Inc.	
106.7	KTKX	106.7 The Eagle	Classic rock	Cox Radio Inc.	
107.5	KVBH	Vibe 107.5	Hip Hop/R&B	Uforia Audio Network	

== See also ==
- Texas media
  - List of newspapers in Texas
  - List of radio stations in Texas
  - List of television stations in Texas
  - Media of cities in Texas: Abilene, Amarillo, Austin, Beaumont, Brownsville, Dallas, Denton, El Paso, Fort Worth, Houston, Killeen, Laredo, Lubbock, McAllen, McKinney, Midland, Odessa, Waco, Wichita Falls
