= KONO =

KONO may refer to:

- KONO (AM), a radio station (860 AM) in San Antonio, Texas, United States
- KONO-FM, a radio station (101.1 FM) in Helotes, Texas, United States
- KSAT-TV, a television station (channel 12) in San Antonio, Texas, United States that had the call signs KONO from 1957 to 1969
- The ICAO identifier for Ontario Municipal Airport in Ontario, Oregon, United States
- Masayuki Kono, also known as KONO, Japanese professional wrestler and mixed martial artist

== See also ==
- Kono (disambiguation)
- Konno, a surname
- Kouno (disambiguation)
