= KTKX =

Radio station in Terrell Hills, Texas

- Terrell Hills, Texas; United States
- Broadcast area: Greater San Antonio
- Frequency: 106.7 MHz (HD Radio)
- Branding: 106.7 The Eagle

Programming
- Language: English
- Format: Classic rock

Ownership
- Owner: Cox Media Group; (CMG NY/Texas Radio, LLC)
- Sister stations: KCYY; KISS-FM; KKYX; KONO; KONO-FM; KSMG

History
- First air date: July 18, 1979
- Former call signs: KTUF (1979–1983); KESI (1983–1987); KMMX (1987–1992); KKYX-FM (1992–1993); KDIL (1993–1995); KCJZ (1995–2003); KELZ-FM (2003–2006); KPWT (2006–2010)
- Former frequencies: 106.3 MHz (1979–1986)
- Call sign meaning: Station previously branded as X106.7

Technical information
- Licensing authority: FCC
- Facility ID: 70357
- Class: C0
- ERP: 100,000 watts
- HAAT: 310 meters (1,020 ft)
- Transmitter coordinates: 29.184°N 98.514°W

Links
- Public license information: Public file; LMS
- Webcast: Listen live
- Website: eaglesanantonio.com

KTKX (106.7 FM, "106.7 The Eagle") is a commercial radio station licensed to Terrell Hills, Texas, and serving the San Antonio metropolitan area. Owned by Cox Radio, KTKX has a classic rock format with studios on Datapoint Drive in Northwest San Antonio near the South Texas Medical Center complex and transmitter sited off Hallmark Path in southern Bexar County.

KTKX also broadcasts in HD Radio.

== History ==
=== 106.3 KTUF and KESI ===
Before 1979, KBUC-FM (now KVBH) was heard on 106.3 in the San Antonio radio market. In 1979, it moved to 107.5, clearing the way for a new station to go on the air at 106.3. KTUF signed on the air on July 18, 1979. It was San Antonio's first commercial FM radio station with a jazz format. KTUF was the FM counterpart to KAPE (now KCHL), with both stations owned by the Southern Sound System Broadcasting Company. KTUF broadcast at only 3,000 watts, because 106.3 FM was originally a Class A frequency, reserved for lower-powered stations.

In 1982, the station was acquired by S.I.T. Broadcasting. The following year, the format changed to album rock with the station taking the KESI call sign. It would then flip to easy listening music, followed by an adult contemporary music format known as "Star 106." Ratings on all of these formats underperformed, in part due to the station's low power.

=== Move to 106.7 ===
In 1986, KESI switched frequencies from 106.3 to 106.7 FM. Moving to 106.7 was coupled with a big boost in power, going to 100,000 watts. The next year, KESI switched call letters to KMMX, becoming "K-Mix 106.7". The AC format would remain intact for several more years.

In November 1992, KMMX flipped to a simulcast of country-formatted KKYX, with a change in call signs to KKYX-FM. The flip gave San Antonio three full power FM country stations, with KAJA and KCYY playing mostly contemporary country hits, while KKYX-AM-FM leaned toward classic country.

The simulcast ended the following year, just in time for the 1993 San Antonio Stock Show & Rodeo. KKYX-FM switched to Contemporary Country, calling itself "106.7 The Armadillo", and took the call letters KDIL (with DIL contained within the word "armadillo," a small placental mammal common to South Texas).

=== Smooth Jazz ===
"The Armadillo" lasted only two years, when 106.7 was bought by KCYY's owners New City Communications. KCYY was (and still is) in the middle of a tough ratings battle with Clear Channel Communications' KAJA.

To avoid overlapping with KCYY, KDIL became "Smooth Jazz 106.7 KCJZ" at Midnight on February 24, 1995.

=== Rhythmic Oldies ===
In 1997, current owner Cox Communications acquired KCJZ and the other New City stations. After four years as smooth jazz, on July 1, 1999, Cox changed KCJZ's format to rhythmic oldies, branded as "106.7 JAMZ". The station's playlist consisted of classic disco music, R&B and Motown hits.

By August 2001, KCJZ shifted to Rhythmic/Dance Top 40 format, while retaining the "Jamz" moniker and KCJZ call letters.

=== Contemporary Hits ===
On October 31, 2003, at 10 a.m., after "Thriller" by Michael Jackson, KCJZ flipped to Mainstream Top 40 as "Z 106.7", and changed call letters to KELZ. The first song played was "Where is the Love?" by The Black Eyed Peas. The flip gave the San Antonio market two mainstream Top 40 stations, the other being KXXM, owned by Clear Channel (now iHeartMedia). At first, KELZ's playlist was broad-based, airing "All The Hits" in an effort to cut into KXXM, whose direction at times tended to lean toward modern rock.

Power 106.7 logo

=== Power 106.7 ===
On October 6, 2006, KELZ flipped back to rhythmic contemporary and adopted the "Power 106.7" branding, along with a call letter change to KPWT to match it. The move gave San Antonio its first Rhythmic battle since 2003, with KPWT competing against the dominant KBBT. With the switch, KPWT became the second station in San Antonio to adopt the "Power" moniker, the last station using the brand was KITY from 1987 to 1990.

=== FM Talk ===
At Noon on May 28, 2009, while playing "Love Lockdown" by Kanye West, the sound of jingling bells played, increasingly getting louder, followed by just the sound of the bells for about 30 seconds as the song ended. This led to KPWT stunting with Christmas music as "Santa 106.7."

At 5 p.m. on June 1, 2009, the station became "FM Talk 106.7." The lineup included Mancow Muller, Neal Boortz, Laura Ingraham, Michael Savage and Clark Howard. The move behind this switch may have been the pending use of Portable People Meters (PPM) in determining ratings in the San Antonio market. Although Cox have had success with FM talk stations in Atlanta, Orlando, Jacksonville, Tulsa and Dayton, the talk format suffered from low ratings and did not survive a full year.

=== World Class Rock ===
On April 1, 2010, at 12 p.m., the station began stunting with the sound of a clock ticking, with a voice telling listeners to tune in on April 5 at 5 p.m. to find out the station's new format. At that time, a classic-based Adult Album Alternative format was launched as "X106.7, World Class Rock," with "Take Me to the River" by Talking Heads being the first song played. The station did not use DJs, and was automated like KJXK, but focused on classic alternative and classic rock hits, and was not as hard-edged as KZEP, which focused on harder classic titles from the rock era. Most of KPWT's talk lineup moved to Clear Channel Communications-owned KRPT on April 15. Five days later, on April 20, KPWT changed call letters to KTKX to go with the "X106.7" branding.

This was not the first time the AAA format was tried in San Antonio; the first was KMFR "103.7 Mighty Fine Rock" from 2001 to 2004 (now KAHL-FM airing Adult Standards).

=== Classic Rock ===
On November 15, 2010, KTKX turned to a straight-ahead classic rock format to compete directly with rival KZEP. KTKX re-positioned itself as "San Antonio's Most Commercial Free Classic Rock." Throughout June 2014, Cox-owned stations in Orlando (WCFB's HD-2 feed) and Atlanta (WTSH) were heard flipping to alternative rock using the "X" name. Orlando saw the debut of "X107.3" and "X107.1" premiered in Atlanta, and each was called "Orlando's/Atlanta's New Alternative." Prior to this, Cox owned "X"-named alternative formats in Tampa Bay (WSUN-FM) and Jacksonville (WXXJ). Because of these stations, rumors spread that San Antonio would be next in line to "Join the Revolution" and switch "X106.7" to what would've been the market's first mainstream alternative station.

However, on August 8, competitor KZEP moved its classic rock format to the station's HD-2 feed and 93.3 translator, as the main channel flipped to a Rhythmic Contemporary format as "Hot 104.5." In response, KTKX dropped the "X" name that same weekend and simply called itself "106.7, The Only Classic Rock Station You Can Hear Everywhere in San Antonio." On August 15, KTKX changed its slogan to "106.7 The Eagle, San Antonio's ONLY classic rock." Alternative rock returned to San Antonio on Alpha Media's "103.3 The App," which is broadcast on translator station K277CX and KTFM's HD2 subchannel until 2017.
