= KNAF =

KNAF may refer to:

- KNAF (AM), a radio station (910 AM) licensed to Fredericksburg, Texas, United States
- KNAF-FM, a radio station (105.7 FM) licensed to Fredericksburg, Texas, United States
