= Baptist Health System =

Hospital and medical facility system in San Antonio, Texas

Coordinates: 29°26′20.6″N 98°25′39.7″W

Baptist Health System is a hospital and medical facility system located in San Antonio, Texas, United States. It is owned by Tenet Healthcare. Baptist Health System is seven hospitals plus imaging centers, physical therapy clinics and more across the greater San Antonio area.

Baptist Health System has a history of excellence dating back to 1903. Recognition includes a “Best Hospital Award” from Money Magazine and The Leapfrog Group and the Stroke Gold Plus with Honor Roll Elite & Type 2 Diabetes Honor Roll by the American Heart Association.

The hospital provides services in the following specialties:

- Bariatric Surgery
- Cardiovascular
- Emergency Room
- Gastroenterology
- General Surgery
- Gynecology
- Imaging & Radiology Services
- Lung Biopsy
- Neuroscience
- Obstetrics
- Oncology
- Orthopedics
- Pediatrics
- Physical Therapy
- Primary Care
- Psychiatry
- Spine Care
- Urology
- Wound Care

== History ==
In 1903 a group of 30 or more physicians, members of the young Bexar County Medical Society, together with about 30 business and professional men organized the San Antonio Associated Charities which built a four-story hospital on Dallas Street, the Physicians' and Surgeons' Hospital.

It was affiliated with the Baptist General Convention of Texas between 1948 and 2003.

== Hospitals and facilities ==
Baptist Health System includes five acute-care hospitals which offer 1,673 licensed beds:

- Baptist Medical Center in Downtown San Antonio
- Mission Trail Baptist Hospital on the South Side
- North Central Baptist Hospital in the Stone Oak district
- Northeast Baptist Hospital on the eastern fringe of Uptown San Antonio
- St. Luke's Baptist Hospital in the Medical Center

The system also includes:

- Baptist Regional Children's Center
- Baptist Women's Health Center
- HealthLink wellness and fitness center
- Baptist M&S Imaging Centers
- Community health and wellness programs
- Ambulatory services
- Rehabilitation services
- Medical office buildings including the newly opened Westover Baptist Medical Building
- San Antonio AirLife air medical transport
- Baptist Health System School of Health Professions.

== Accreditations and memberships ==
- It is accredited by the Joint Commission on the Accreditation of Healthcare Organizations (JCAHO).
- The Society of Chest Pain Centers has granted the designation of Accredited Chest Pain Center to each of the five hospitals in the Baptist Health System. Baptist Medical Center, Mission Trail Baptist Hospital, North Central Baptist Hospital, Northeast Baptist Hospital and St. Luke's Baptist Hospital received full accreditation status from the Accreditation Review Committee on November 3, 2005. They are the first, and currently only, Accredited Chest Pain Centers in San Antonio, and are among fewer than 180 in the nation.
- Baptist Health System laboratories are accredited by the College of American Pathologists.
- The Comprehensive Cancer Program of the Baptist Health System is accredited by the American College of Surgeons.
- Baptist M&S Imaging Centers and Baptist Health System imaging departments are accredited by the American College of Radiology.
- The Diabetes Self Management Course of Baptist Health System is Recognized by the American Diabetes Association.
- The inpatient Rehabilitation Centers at St. Luke's Baptist Hospital and Baptist Medical Center are accredited by the Commission on Accreditation of Rehabilitation Facilities.
- San Antonio AirLife is among an elite group of emergency transport services in the U.S. to earn re-accreditation from the Commission on Accreditation of Medical Transport Systems. AirLife, owned jointly by the Baptist Health System and the University Health System, is one of only about 100 transport programs in the nation to meet these standards.
- The Baptist Health System facilities listed in the Texas Department of State Health Services (DSHS) designated Texas Stroke Facilities registry are:
  - Northeast Baptist Hospital (San Antonio, TX)
  - Baptist Medical Center (San Antonio, TX)
