= KSMG =

Radio station in Seguin, Texas

- Seguin, Texas; United States
- Broadcast area: Greater San Antonio
- Frequency: 105.3 MHz (HD Radio)
- Branding: Hits 105.3

Programming
- Language: English
- Format: Hot adult contemporary

Ownership
- Owner: Cox Media Group; (CMG NY/Texas Radio, LLC)
- Sister stations: KCYY; KISS-FM; KKYX; KONO; KONO-FM; KTKX

History
- First air date: September 9, 1970
- Former call signs: KWED-FM (1970–1985)
- Call sign meaning: San Antonio Magic (prior branding)

Technical information
- Licensing authority: FCC
- Facility ID: 34977
- Class: C0
- ERP: 97,500 watts
- HAAT: 453 meters (1,486 ft)
- Transmitter coordinates: 29.275°N 98.265°W

Links
- Public license information: Public file; LMS
- Webcast: Listen live
- Website: hits1053sanantonio.com

KSMG (105.3 FM, "Hits 105.3") is a radio station licensed to Seguin, Texas. Owned by Cox Media Group, it broadcasts a hot adult contemporary format serving Greater San Antonio.

Its transmitter is in near Elmendorf in far northwestern Wilson County. Its studios are located in northwest San Antonio near the South Texas Medical Center complex. KSMG has an ERP of 97.5 kW. The station broadcasts in the HD radio format.

== History ==
Seguin Broadcasting Company, Inc., owners of KWED (1580 AM), filed a construction permit for a new radio station to broadcast on 105.3 MHz on September 15, 1969, which was granted by the FCC on December 31. The station began broadcasting September 9, 1970; like the AM station, it aired a middle of the road format, and it simulcast the AM station 40 percent of the time.

FCC regulatory changes made in 1984 would have required KWED-FM to increase its power, which would have given the station a significant signal over San Antonio. Seguin Broadcasting Company, headed by Stan McKenzie, had no desire to run a major-market station. In late 1984, McKenzie reached a deal to sell KWED to American Media, Inc., which owned stations in Baltimore and on Long Island. The divestiture of the FM prompted programming changes at the AM, including the end of afternoon Spanish-language shows that had aired since 1948.

In March 1985, after the signal upgrade was completed, American Media's programming debuted and the station relaunched as "Magic 105", a gold-based adult contemporary format. In its first ratings book, KSMG cracked the top five in San Antonio. The station went full into the oldies format in 1988 upon its acquisition by The Rusk Corporation. Jacor filed to buy the station in 1989 in a deal that ultimately never closed; it was part of a package deal with KTRH and KLOL in Houston, and the company was forced to take the San Antonio-market station in order to purchase the Houston outlets. Rusk consolidated its position in the classic hits format in San Antonio when it entered into a local marketing agreement to take over the operations of a struggling KISS-FM in November 1991; KISS simulcasted KSMG until it returned to its heritage rock format on December 31, 1991.

At the end of 1995, KSMG shifted to hot adult contemporary. In 1997, Cox Radio acquired KSMG; KISS-FM, which Rusk had bought outright; and KLUP (930 AM) from Rusk in a $30 million transaction. The station later shifted to mainstream adult contemporary; in 2014, as the station shifted back toward hot AC, Mediabase added KSMG to its Hot AC panel.

On December 26, 2023, following its annual Christmas music period, the station rebranded as "Hits 105.3" with no change in format

When KXXM flipped from its long-running Top 40 format to a bilingual adult contemporary format on November 1, 2024, KSMG became the only station in the market devoted to mainstream English-language popular music. A few days later on November 7, longtime morning hosts Jenny Lee and Tony Cortez left the station.
