= Kono =

Kono may refer to:

== Geography ==
- Kono District, a district in the Eastern Province of Sierra Leone
  - Kono people, an ethnic group in Sierra Leone
- Kono, Nigeria, a village in Rivers State, Nigeria
- Kōno, Fukui, a village in Fukui, Japan

== Languages ==
- Kono language (Sierra Leone), a Mande language of Sierra Leone
- Kono language (Guinea), a Mande language of Guinea
- Kono language (Nigeria), a Benue-Congo language of Nigeria

== People with the given name ==
- Kono Yasui (保井 コノ; 1880–1971), Japanese biologist and cytologist

== People with the surname ==
- Kōno, a Japanese family name (including a list of people with the name)
- Hiromichi Kono (1905–1963), Japanese entomologist and anthropologist
- Hiyori Kono (河野 ひより; born 1998), Japanese voice actress

== Other ==
- Gonu, Korean traditional board games

== See also ==
- KONO (disambiguation)
- Konno, a surname
- Kouno (disambiguation)
- Kono Kalakaua (disambiguation)
