= KONO (AM) =

Radio station in San Antonio, Texas

- San Antonio, Texas; United States
- Broadcast area: San Antonio metropolitan area
- Frequency: 860 kHz
- Branding: Business Radio 860

Programming
- Language: English
- Format: Business News/talk
- Network: Bloomberg Radio

Ownership
- Owner: Cox Media Group; (CMG NY/Texas Radio, LLC)
- Sister stations: KCYY; KISS-FM; KKYX; KONO-FM; KSMG; KTKX

History
- First air date: January 17, 1927
- Former call signs: KGRC (1927–1930)

Technical information
- Licensing authority: FCC
- Facility ID: 50029
- Class: B
- Power: 5,000 watts day; 900 watts night
- Transmitter coordinates: 29.444°N 98.418°W
- Repeater: 101.1 KONO-FM HD2 (Helotes)

Links
- Public license information: Public file; LMS

KONO (860 kHz) is a commercial AM radio station in San Antonio, Texas. The station is owned by Cox Media Group, and airs a business news/talk radio format. KONO's studios are located in Northwest San Antonio near the South Texas Medical Center complex. The transmitter site with two towers is located on Creekview Drive, near the Salado Creek Greenway and Interstate 35.

KONO broadcasts with 5,000 watts, with a non-directional signal by day. Because AM 860 is a clear channel frequency reserved for CJBC in Toronto, KONO reduces power at night to 900 watts, using a directional antenna, to avoid interfering with other stations.

== History ==
=== Early years ===
KONO is the fourth-oldest radio station in San Antonio. It was first licensed, as KGRC, on January 17, 1927, to Gene Roth & Company. On January 24, 1930, the station changed its call letters to KONO.

The station began as a hobby for Eugene Roth in a room over his garage in downtown San Antonio. As the broadcasting industry grew, Eugene Roth's son, Jack, began working with his dad, later inheriting the station. At first, it only transmitted with 100 watts of power, broadcasting on 1370 kilocycles and having to share time on the air with other stations. It later moved to AM 1400 before relocating to its current home on AM 860.

In February 1947, an FM station was added, KONO-FM at 92.9 MHz. (The FM station later took the call sign KITY and is currently KROM.) Eugene Roth served as the president of Mission Broadcasting, while Jack was the station's general manager.

In the 1950s, KONO's format was country & western music. In 1957, Mission Broadcasting put KONO-TV (now KSAT-TV) on the air. It was San Antonio's third television station, an ABC Network affiliate.

=== Top 40 - The Big 86 ===
In the 1960s and 70s, KONO, "The Big 86," was one of the leading Top 40 stations in San Antonio. Some of the on air personnel were Howard Edwards, Don Couser, Woody Roberts, Skinny Don Green, Lee 'Baby' Simms, Dave Mitchell, Johnny Shannon, Charlie Scott, Nick St John and Frank Jolley. KONO won national awards in the 60s for its popularity and creativity. In 1965, Bob Pearson and Howard Edwards were selected as two of the top radio personalities in the country. KONO and its sister station KITY would remain at 317 Arden Grove, attached to the KSAT-TV building, until the early 1990s, when they moved to a location on NE Loop 410.

In the 1970s, KONO and KTSA battled in the Top 40 format. Although KONO's more recurrent-based style frequently played second-fiddle to the more current-oriented KTSA, it continued to do well. The two stations provided a nice 1-2 punch that made WOAI regret its brief flirtation with the top-40 format in the mid-'70s. The two also ran AM/FM simulcast KQAM/KSAQ (“Q-100”) out of the format after a few years.

KONO began the 1980s with the same recurrent-heavy Top 40 format it had in the 1970s but with a softer sound than before. KONO's days as a true contemporary hits station were numbered, as AM Top 40 stations were rapidly losing audience to FM upstarts. KONO began to evolve to a gold-based Adult Contemporary direction while its Top 40 format replaced the AC format on sister station KITY.

=== Oldies format ===
At the end of 1985, Jack Roth announced he was selling KONO and KITY to Duffy Broadcasting, based in Dallas. Until this point, KONO had been owned by the Roth family for its entire existence. In 1987, Duffy struck a deal with Booth American in 1987 that created Genesis Broadcasting.

About a year later, KONO became a "rock 'n roll oldies" station, jettisoning music from the mid-'70s while adding some older titles. However, in 1988, KSMG dropped its AC format to go oldies, and KONO, once again, struggled to maintain its audience against an FM upstart.

KONO began the 1990s getting further squeezed within the oldies format. In the summer of 1990, KISS-FM announced it was dropping its longtime album rock format to go oldies, and it would flip its sister station, bilingual KRIA (now KLUP), to a nationally syndicated oldies service as "Kool Gold."

=== Adding KONO-FM ===
Continuing to struggle and looking for answers, Genesis announced it would set up a local marketing agreement (LMA) to operate KFAN (101.1 FM). KFAN, licensed to Fredericksburg, was an Adult Album Alternative station heavily focused on Texas artists. The plan was to flip it to a simulcast of KONO. KONO-AM-FM and KITY would make San Antonio's first FM/FM combination and, in August 1992, would help lead to the FCC relaxing its rules prohibiting ownership of more than one station per service per market (known as a "duopoly").

KONO-FM launched in late January/early February 1991 and paid immediate dividends. Although it would take another two years for KONO-AM-FM to top KSMG, KISS watched its oldies ratings slip, and would end up firing its entire airstaff that summer to run the Satellite Music Network's "Pure Gold" format. Ironically, after Rusk's attempt to sell KSMG to Jacor failed, KISS-AM-FM were LMA'ed to Rusk to combine with KSMG. Rusk aired KSMG's format on both KISS stations in addition beginning in October 1991 and flipped KISS to adult standards as "KLUP The Loop." In December, KISS-FM returned to its previous active rock format. KONO-AM-FM overtook KSMG in the ratings a year later.

In 1992, after the FCC allowed duopolies, Booth American began to prepare for a merger. The resulting company, which combined with Broadcast Alchemy, became known as Secret Communications. It spun off Booth's Top 40 outlet WZPL in Indianapolis, and kept two FM stations already owned by Broadcast Alchemy, along with all of the Genesis stations except for Sacramento and Denver. In December 1992, KONO's sister station, KSRR-FM, was sold to Tichenor Media. In March 1993, it flipped it to Spanish-language programming.

=== Change in ownership ===
Also in 1993, Genesis announced it would not be exercising its option to buy KONO-FM. Instead, Gillespie Broadcasting, the owners of KONO-FM as well as Fredericksburg-based KNAF and the new KFAN-FM in Johnson City, planned to buy KONO.

After closing on the sales of KONO and the other remaining Genesis stations, Booth and Broadcast Alchemy announced their merger. Then, KONO-AM-FM were sold once again, this time to longtime San Antonio general manager John W. Barger. Barger had also acquired KWCB in Floresville a couple years earlier and moved its tower closer to San Antonio, renaming it KRIO-FM and switching its dial position to 94.1 MHz. During this time, KONO's higher ratings forced KSMG out of the oldies format once and for all, first for a 1970s-driven AC format known as "The Best Mix of the '60s, '70s and '80s...The Oldies Revolution!" and later to a Hot AC format, as "The Best Mix of the '70s, '80s and '90s."

After successfully moving KWCB into the San Antonio radio market, Barger started working on moving KONO-FM closer to San Antonio. The initial proposal called for KONO-FM to broadcast from the tower used by KAJA (which was named for Barger's kids when he was the GM). Barger proposed switching KONO-FM's city of license from Fredericksburg to Castroville. KONO-FM would also downgrade from a Class C to a Class C1. A counter-proposal was actually granted by the FCC, where KONO-FM would move to KAJA's tower, but be licensed to Helotes, making up for an AM station licensed to that city that went dark several years earlier.

=== Cox Radio acquisition ===
In 1996, radio ownership rules were further relaxed with the Telecommunications Act of 1996. In 1998, Cox Radio, entered the market by acquiring New City Communications and its three stations: KKYX, KCYY and KCJZ. Then, Cox acquired Rusk Communications. and Barger (Cox spun off KRIO-FM to comply with ownership rules.) Cox had assembled a super cluster that combined the four former oldies stations, once bitter rivals, under the same roof.

The simulcast on KONO and KONO-FM ended when the AM flipped to all sports using the CBS Sports Radio Network, beginning January 31, 2014.

On January 13, 2017, at 6 p.m., KONO returned to oldies. This time, KONO concentrated on the 1960s/70s, while KONO-FM skews a bit younger, with a mostly 1980s-based playlist with some 70s titles and a few 90s songs.

On August 28, 2024, it was reported that KONO flipped from oldies to business talk Bloomberg Radio. The final song played on KONO as “86KONO” was “Daydream” by The Lovin’ Spoonful.
