= Kouno =

Kouno may refer to:

- Battle of Kouno (1899) battle in Africa of Muslims versus French troops
- Kouno, Chad, a sub-prefecture in the Chari-Baguirmi Region of Chad
- Kōno, Japanese surname sometimes romanized as Kouno

== See also ==
- Konno
- Kono (disambiguation)
