= KISS-FM =

Mainstream rock radio station in San Antonio

- San Antonio, Texas; United States
- Broadcast area: Greater San Antonio
- Frequency: 99.5 MHz (HD Radio)
- Branding: 99.5 KISS

Programming
- Language: English
- Format: Mainstream rock

Ownership
- Owner: Cox Media Group; (CMG NY/Texas Radio, LLC)
- Sister stations: KCYY; KKYX; KONO; KONO-FM; KSMG; KTKX

History
- First air date: December 9, 1946
- Call sign meaning: The word kiss

Technical information
- Licensing authority: FCC
- Facility ID: 34976
- Class: C0
- ERP: 100,000 watts
- HAAT: 453 meters (1,486 ft)
- Transmitter coordinates: 29.275°N 98.265°W

Links
- Public license information: Public file; LMS
- Webcast: Listen live
- Website: kissrocks.com

KISS-FM (99.5 MHz) is a commercial radio station in San Antonio, Texas. It airs a mainstream rock format and is owned by Cox Media Group. The studios and offices are located on Datapoint Drive in Northwest San Antonio near the South Texas Medical Center complex. The transmitter site is in Elmendorf, amid the towers for several San Antonio TV and FM stations.

== History ==
=== Early years ===
In December 1946, the station first signed on the air. It was owned by The Walmac Company, along with sister station KMAC (now KSLR). KMAC and KISS-FM simulcast their programming, mostly from the Mutual Broadcasting System. The schedule included dramas, comedies, news, sports and big band broadcasts, during the "Golden Age of Radio".

The simulcast ended in the late 1960s, as the Federal Communications Commission (FCC) encouraged AM-FM combos to offer separate programming. KISS-FM began carrying a beautiful music format, including instrumental cover versions of popular songs as well as Broadway and Hollywood show tunes.

=== Switch to rock ===
KISS-FM's format changed to free form progressive rock in the mid 1970s. In the 1980s, the playlist stressed hit albums as the station segued to album-oriented rock. During the early years, KISS-FM DJs were mostly given a free rein; many brought in their own vinyl albums, producing their own shows within a looser rock ballad and heavy metal format. The most notable past KISS/KMAC DJs/personalities were Joe "The Godfather" Anthony and Lou Roney, who worked together for many years.

With KISS-FM's hard-edged rock format, San Antonio became known as the "Heavy Metal Capital Of The World". Scores of bands can attribute their first and subsequent successes to airplay at KISS-FM.

Co-owned KMAC broadcast show tunes, opera, as well as religious programs such as the Mormon Tabernacle Choir until noon, when the AM station would simulcast the rock format heard on KISS-FM. At 6 p.m., KMAC would switch away from the simulcast and broadcast rock and progressive country till signing off at midnight. In those earlier years, KISS-FM signed off at midnight each night. "Spread The Word" was the popular window sticker slogan & on-air moniker during the 1970s and 1980s.

On August 1, 1979, longtime station owner Howard W. Davis died, and eight months later, KMAC and KISS-FM were sold by his estate to Raleigh, North Carolina–based Capitol Broadcasting Company for $4.65 million. Capitol president James F. Goodmon, upon announcing the sale, said that they were "excited about entering the dynamic San Antonio market and becoming a part of the community".

In 1987, Adams Radio bought KISS-FM for $13 million after a previous sale to Noble Broadcast Group the year before failed to close.

=== Brief tenure with oldies ===
The rock format was set aside for a year and a half. On the morning of July 19, 1990, KISS-FM abruptly flipped to oldies as "99.5 KISS Oldies". Adams corporate programming director B.J. Hunter stated that "very simply, this was a financial decision that we had to make". Station vice president Rick Joppie noted that the station had been underperforming since 1987, and that the parent company had success with the oldies format in other markets. Joppie added that "we are a company that needs to make money".

Local outrage was fierce, with the station's phone lines jammed the day of the switch. Steve Coffman, operations manager of KFAN-FM, said that the format change was "one of the more stupid moves I've seen in corporate radio". While the new owners hoped the new format would increase the station's ratings, the opposite happened. In its last full book as a rock station, KISS held a 5.0 share, and by the summer 1990 book, the station's rating fell to a 3.0 share in the coveted 25-54 demographic. By contrast, competing oldies station KSMG was the city's number one radio station and actually increased its audience despite KISS' flip to the format, jumping from a 7.7 share in the spring book to a 9.7 in the summer book. By Memorial Day 1991, the station had changed general managers twice. Two program directors had also come and gone, one staying less than two months, and the entire inaugural full-time airstaff was out.

The Rusk Corporation, which owned KSMG, began to lease KISS AM and FM from Adams in November 1991. Rusk began simulcasting KSMG on both 99.5 FM and 930 AM at 3 p.m. on November 8 as a stopgap measure while new formats were prepared for the two frequencies. KSMG general manager Caroline Devine remarked that "the new sounds will be anything but oldies".

=== Return to rock ===
On December 31, 1991, the rock music format returned to KISS-FM, this time with an active rock format.

In 1997, KISS-FM was acquired by Cox Radio. As of 2012, the station's format was described as mainstream rock, although it has gone back to active rock in recent years. Despite being considered a mainstream rock reporter by Mediabase, KISS-FM has typically been an active rock station, according to Nielsen BDS.

=== KISS-FM callsign ===
KISS-FM is the legal call sign issued to this station by the FCC. It has had the call letters since its founding in 1946. The KISS-FM call sign is not related to the "KISS-FM" brand name used by iHeartMedia, Inc. iHeart uses the moniker "Kiss-FM" on many of its Top 40/CHR stations and a few using other formats. It originated with Los Angeles's KIIS-FM, which has called itself KIIS-FM since 1975.

Despite San Antonio being the headquarters city of iHeartMedia, the company seems to have a gentlemen's agreement not to have a KISS-FM-branded station in the city, while Cox has not attempted to claim rights on the branding despite holding the official KISS-FM call letters from the FCC. Of note, Cox owns WALR-FM, an urban adult contemporary station in its home city of Atlanta, which utilizes the "KISS-FM" branding. iHeart has KISS-FM stations in Los Angeles, Chicago (WKSC-FM), Dallas (KHKS), Boston (WXKS-FM), and other cities.
