= KFAN =

KFAN may refer to:

- KFAN (AM), a radio station (1270 AM) licensed to Rochester, Minnesota, United States
- KFAN-FM, a radio station (107.9 FM) licensed to Johnson City, Texas, United States
- KTLK (AM), a radio station (1130 AM) licensed to Minneapolis, Minnesota, which held the call sign KFAN from 1991 to 2011
- KFXN-FM, a radio station (100.3 FM) licensed to Minneapolis, Minnesota, which is branded "KFAN"
