= KONO-FM =

- Helotes, Texas; United States
- Broadcast area: San Antonio, Texas
- Frequency: 101.1 MHz (HD Radio)
- Branding: KONO 101-1

Programming
- Language: English
- Format: Classic hits
- Subchannels: HD2: Business news/talk (KONO simulcast)

Ownership
- Owner: Cox Media Group; (CMG NY/Texas Radio, LLC)
- Sister stations: KCYY; KISS-FM; KKYX; KONO; KSMG; KTKX

History
- First air date: February 18, 1971
- Former call signs: KNAF (1971–1981); KFAN (1981–1990)

Technical information
- Licensing authority: FCC
- Facility ID: 50030
- Class: C1
- ERP: 96,000 watts
- HAAT: 302 meters (991 ft)
- Transmitter coordinates: 29.524°N 98.724°W

Links
- Public license information: Public file; LMS
- Webcast: Listen live
- Website: kono1011.com

KONO-FM (101.1 MHz) is a commercial radio station licensed to Helotes, Texas, and it serves Greater San Antonio. It is owned by Cox Media Group and airs a classic hits radio format. Its studios are located in Northwest San Antonio near the South Texas Medical Center complex, and the transmitter site is located in far-north Bexar County, Texas, at the intersection of Farm to Market Road 1560 and Galm Road, near the Government Canyon State Natural Area.

KONO-FM features a playlist of hit songs from co-owned KONO (AM)'s long history of Top 40 music from the 1970s and 1980s. Using the slogan "San Antonio's Greatest Hits", KONO-FM's core artists include The Eagles, The Bee Gees, Michael Jackson, Lionel Richie, Hall and Oates and others with a few songs from the 1960s and the 1990s. During the holiday season, the station goes back to the 1950s through the 1990s for several holiday classics.

== History ==
KONO-FM first signed on the air on February 18, 1971, as KNAF-FM, the sister station to KNAF (AM) in Fredericksburg, Texas. At first it simulcast the country music format on the AM station, but by the mid-1970s it had a separately programmed beautiful music format. It later took the call letters KFAN, as an adult album alternative station. The station then moved to the San Antonio media market as KONO-FM, simulcasting KONO from May 1990 until KONO changed its format to sports radio in January 2014. During that time, KBKK (107.9 FM) in Johnson City started broadcasting KFAN's previous Adult Alternative format. About a year later it acquired the KFAN-FM call sign.
