= CCRI =

CCRI is a four-letter initialism which may stand for the following:

- California Civil Rights Initiative
- Children's Cancer Research Institute
- Clandestine Revolutionary Indigenous Committee (CCRI in Spanish)
- Commonwealth Computer Research, Inc.
- Community College of Rhode Island
- Correspondance Commerciale-Réponse Internationale, International Business Reply Service IBRS
- Cyber Civil Rights Initiative
- Cyprus Cancer Research Institute
- Czech Clinical Research Institute
