= WGJK =

Radio station in Rome, Georgia

- Rome, Georgia; United States
- Broadcast area: Rome GA area
- Frequency: 1360 kHz
- Branding: K Country 99.5 92.7

Programming
- Format: Country

Ownership
- Owner: Woman's World

History
- First air date: 1962
- Former call signs: WIYN (1964–1988); WRJY (1988–1989); WTSH (1989–2005)

Technical information
- Licensing authority: FCC
- Facility ID: 7044
- Class: D
- Power: 500 watts day 47 watts night
- Transmitter coordinates: 34°16′15.00″N 85°11′0.00″W
- Translators: 92.7 W224DS (Rome); 99.5 W258CH (Rome)

Links
- Public license information: Public file; LMS
- Webcast: Listen Live
- Website: mykcountry.com

WGJK (1360 AM, "K Country 99.5 92.7") is a radio station broadcasting a country music format. Licensed to Rome, Georgia, United States, the station serves the Rome GA area. The station is currently owned by Woman's World and is in an LMA through Rome Radio Partners, LLC.

== History ==
The station went on the air in 1964 as WIYN, becoming WRJY on May 30, 1988. On August 2, 1989, the station changed its call sign to WTSH and on April 25, 2005, to the current WGJK.
