= Kono Kalakaua =

Kono Kalakaua may refer to:

- Kono Kalakaua, a character in the original Hawaii Five-O television series (1968-1972)
- Kono Kalakaua, a character in the 2010 Hawaii Five-0 television series

== See also ==
- Kono (disambiguation)
- Kalakaua
