= KSAT-TV =

Television station in San Antonio

ATSC 3.0 station
- San Antonio, Texas; United States
- Channels: Digital: 12 (VHF); Virtual: 12
- Branding: KSAT 12; KSAT 12 News (pronounced "K-Sat")

Programming
- Affiliations: 12.1: ABC; for others, see § Subchannels

Ownership
- Owner: Graham Media Group; (Graham Media Group, San Antonio, Inc.)

History
- First air date: January 21, 1957
- Former call signs: KONO-TV (1957–1968)
- Former channel numbers: Analog: 12 (VHF, 1957–2009); Digital: 48 (UHF, until 2009)
- Former affiliations: NTA (secondary, 1958–1959)
- Call sign meaning: San Antonio, Texas (also the ICAO airport code for San Antonio International Airport)

Technical information
- Licensing authority: FCC
- Facility ID: 53118
- ERP: 74 kW
- HAAT: 448 m (1,470 ft)
- Transmitter coordinates: 29°16′12″N 98°15′32″W

Links
- Public license information: Public file; LMS
- Website: www.ksat.com

KSAT-TV (channel 12) is a television station in San Antonio, Texas, United States, affiliated with ABC. Owned by Graham Media Group, the station maintains studios on North St. Mary's Street on the northern edge of downtown, and its transmitter is located off US Highway 181 in northwest Wilson County (northeast of Elmendorf).

== History ==
=== KONO-TV ===
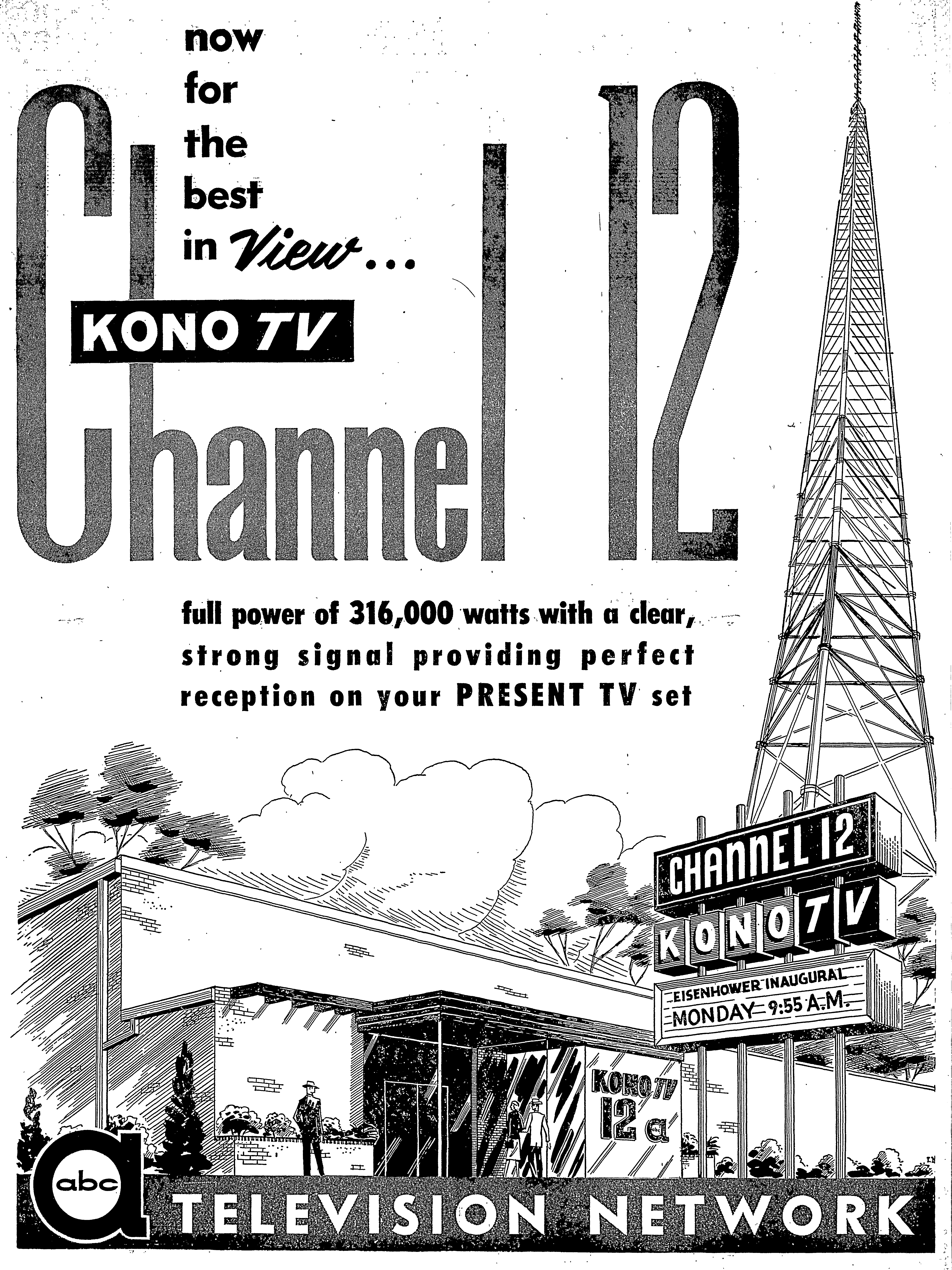
KSAT-TV originally debuted as KONO-TV.

Channel 12 was the last commercial VHF allocation in San Antonio to be awarded. The first applicant for the allocation came in June 1952, from Bexar County Television Corporation, a subsidiary of Alamo Broadcasting Company, owners of radio station KABC. Bexar County Television planned to operate channel 12 as an ABC Television affiliate, owing to the radio station's affiliation with the ABC radio network. Shortly thereafter, Mission Broadcasting Company, owners of KONO radio (860 AM and 92.9 FM), also applied for a channel 12 license. By 1953, both Bexar County Television and Mission Broadcasting proper had dropped out of the running for channel 12. However, two new applicants filed applications: Sunshine Broadcasting Company, then-owners of KTSA radio, and Mission Telecasting Company. Mission was majority (50%) owned by Eugene J. Roth, principal owner of Mission Broadcasting Company, with the other half of the company split among seven individuals.

Sunshine would later withdraw its application, although another player would throw their hat into the ring in January 1954: the Walmac Corporation, owners of KMAC radio. In an attempt to avoid long, drawn-out hearings for a license, Walmac and Mission met in May 1954 to work out an agreement between the two parties. On March 12, 1956, the FCC heard final oral arguments between Walmac and Mission, with an FCC examiner having already favored Mission's application the previous year. In May 1956, the FCC granted a license to Mission and denied Walmac's bid. Mission officials proceeded to construct a new, 16,000-square-foot (1,486 m^{2}) studio building and 574-foot (175 m) tower on North St. Mary's Street, adjacent to the studios for KONO radio.

Originally targeting a sign on date of December 1, 1956, the station would not begin regular testing until the evening of January 14, 1957. Assistant station manager Jack Roth noted that viewers from as far as Corpus Christi, Austin, Kerrville, Boerne, and Camp Wood were all receiving the test pattern. The station finally came on the air for good on January 21, 1957, as KONO-TV, becoming San Antonio's fourth television station and the third to broadcast in English. The station took its call letters from its partially co-owned sister radio stations. Channel 12 has been a full-time ABC affiliate since its debut, more or less by default. The first program broadcast by KONO-TV was the inauguration of President Dwight D. Eisenhower beginning at 10 a.m. that morning.

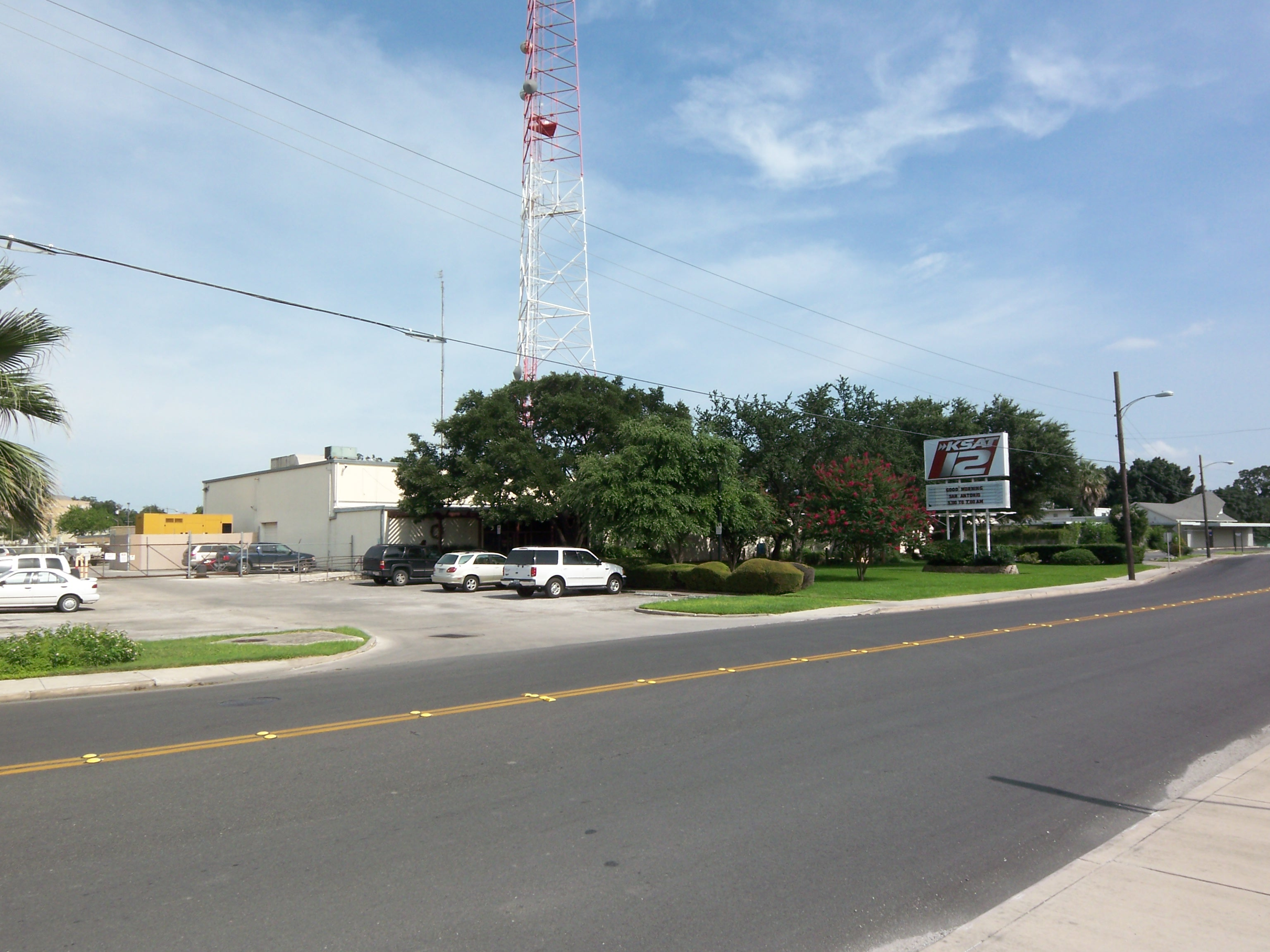
KSAT-TV's former studio facility on North St. Mary's Street.

Mission announced on July 31, 1967, that it had sold channel 12 to Providence, Rhode Island–based The Outlet Company for $10.5 million. Eugene Roth, Mission chairman, said that the reason he decided to sell the station was because of the increasing costs needed to keep pace with the rapidly growing television industry.

=== KSAT-TV ===
Outlet took control of the station in January 1968 and announced that the call letters would be changing to the present KSAT-TV on February 1. The change was necessitated by an FCC regulation at the time in which stations that were not co-owned could not share the same base call sign.

Outlet was taken private in 1986 and the company's new owners sold KSAT to H&C Communications. KSAT nearly lost its ABC affiliation to KENS in 1990. In July of that year, management at KENS were in discussions about switching their station to ABC. KENS management cited that the poor performance of CBS programming would jeopardize the station's overall dominance in the San Antonio market. However, after negotiations did not go anywhere, both KENS and KSAT signed new affiliation agreements with CBS and ABC respectively in August.

KSAT was nearly sold to Young Broadcasting in 1992, but the sale was canceled due to Young's failure to obtain financing. On April 22, 1994, H&C sold KSAT and Houston sister station KPRC-TV to The Washington Post Company (now Graham Holdings Company), which placed the two stations within its Post-Newsweek Stations subsidiary.

In the early 2000s, Post-Newsweek adopted a unified "Local" brand for most of its television stations. KSAT briefly rebranded as "Local 12" in 2004, before reverting to the station's previous branding of "KSAT 12" (the call letters are pronounced syllabically as "K-Sat"). Although the station does not follow this brand standardization, the "Local" wording is periodically visible in the logo bug seen during the station's newscasts, which cycle between both brands (mimicking a similar behavior used by sister stations KPRC-TV and WDIV-TV in Detroit, whose logo bugs cycle between the station's call letters and channel number and their respective on-air brands "Local 2" or "Local 4").

In March 2014, KSAT relocated from its longtime St. Mary's Street studios to a new, state-of-the-art two-story facility that was built in an area that was formerly part of the station's parking lot. The building houses a large newsroom, numerous offices and meeting spaces, a convenience store-style breakroom for staff and a courtyard with outdoor seating as well as a grill and garden area. Demolition began on the former KSAT studio building shortly after the station relocated; by May 2014, that space would be transformed into a new parking lot for station employees and news vehicles.

== Programming ==
=== Newscasts ===
KSAT-TV presently broadcasts 41 hours, 55 minutes of locally produced newscasts each week (with 6 hours, 35 minutes each weekday and 4 1/2 hours each on Saturdays and Sundays).

In 2002, weeknight co-anchor Leslie Mouton was diagnosed with breast cancer; Mouton courageously decided to anchor the evening newscasts without a wig while she was undergoing chemotherapy treatments that resulted in her going bald. Mouton chronicled her treatment and recovery on KSAT, earning accolades from local oncologists and cancer patients. Mouton recounted her battle with the disease in a 2004 interview on The Oprah Winfrey Show (which aired on KSAT at the time), which included clips of Mouton's first anchoring appearance after she lost her hair, including the explanation she gave on-air of what she was going through at the time.

On February 5, 2009, KSAT became the second television station in the San Antonio market to begin broadcasting its local newscasts in high definition. prior to the upgrade, only in-studio cameras recorded in HD, with video downconverted to widescreen standard definition; certain field cameras and other station camera feeds are in standard definition and upconverted to a 16:9 widescreen format in the control room, as some field reports still remain in upconverted 16:9 standard definition.

On May 26, 2011, KSAT debuted a half-hour late afternoon newscast at 4 p.m., titled First News At Four; the program (along with its lead-out Inside Edition) replaced The Oprah Winfrey Show, which ended its syndication run on May 25, 2011. First News At Four ended its run on September 5, 2014.

On September 12, 2011, in a move announced in May 2011, KSAT-TV became the first station in San Antonio to expand its 10 p.m. newscast to one hour; as a result, it was one of the few television stations affiliated with the Big Three networks that airs an hour-long late evening newscast. Also coinciding with the expanded newscast, Inside Edition was reduced from two daily airings to one, as the newscast took over that timeslot; Nightline remained in its timeslot at 11:05 (later occupied by Jimmy Kimmel Live! at 11:05 p.m. and Nightline at 12:05 a.m.). However, ABC's newest affiliation contract has required all its affiliates to carry Kimmel as scheduled at 10:35 p.m., and KSAT, along with several other ABC affiliates carrying extended newscasts, reduced their late newscasts to the traditional 35 minutes at the start of 2019.

In March 2012, KSAT expanded its weekday morning newscast Good Morning San Antonio to 2 1/2 hours, becoming the third station (behind WOAI and later KENS) to expand its morning newscast to the 4:30 a.m. timeslot. That month, the station also added Saturday and Sunday editions of Good Morning San Antonio, in the form of one-hour blocks (with the second half of the Saturday edition running two hours) surrounding the weekend editions of Good Morning America.

In February 2017, KSAT announced the launch of a new hour of programming in the 9 a.m. block, Good Morning San Antonio at 9. In September 2018, the station launched a 9 p.m. newscast, though unusually, the program is exclusive to the station's app on the three major digital media player platforms.

==== Death of Michelle Lima ====
Tragedy struck the station on March 26, 1999, when anchor/reporter and rising star Michelle Lima was killed while reporting live during a newscast from the scene of a search for a 9-year-old boy. As she was helping pack up for a future assignment, Lima was hit by a truck on a dark rural frontage road in southern Bexar County. Lima was airlifted to a local hospital where she was pronounced dead two days later. She was 30 years old.

=== Sports programming ===
KSAT airs select San Antonio Spurs games through the network's contract with the NBA; the station aired four of the team's five NBA Finals victories in 2003, 2005, 2007, and 2014, as well as the team's 2013 and 2026 NBA Finals appearances.

=== Local programming ===
KSAT produces a one-hour lifestyle and variety show, SA Live, weekdays at 10 a.m. In addition, the station produced the hour-long sports highlight and discussion program Instant Replay, which aired Sundays at 11 p.m. until the program's cancellation in March 2025.

== In popular culture ==
The 2000 comedy film Miss Congeniality, which was set around a beauty pageant being held in San Antonio, used KSAT live trucks and microphones with the station's mic flags in a fictional sense; though none of KSAT's actual staff appeared during the film, instead using actors playing a KSAT reporter and a news photographer in a scene in which the film's lead character, FBI agent Gracie Hart (played by Sandra Bullock), is interviewed at The Alamo.

== Technical information ==
=== Subchannels ===
The station's ATSC 1.0 channels are carried on the multiplexed signals of other San Antonio television stations:

Subchannels provided by KSAT-TV (ATSC 1.0)
Subchannel	Res.	Short name	Programming	ATSC 1.0 host
12.1	720p	KSAT-HD	ABC	KLRN
12.2	480i	MeTV	MeTV	KVDA
12.3	480i	Movies!	Movies!	KLRN
12.4	480i	H&I	Heroes & Icons	KENS
12.5	480i	StartTV	Start TV	KNIC-DT

=== Analog-to-digital conversion ===
KSAT-TV ended regular programming on its analog signal, over VHF channel 12, on June 12, 2009, the official date on which full-power television stations in the United States transitioned from analog to digital broadcasts under federal mandate. The station's digital signal relocated from its pre-transition UHF channel 48 to VHF channel 12 for post-transition operations.

=== ATSC 3.0 lighthouse service ===
On May 6, 2024, KSAT-TV converted from an ATSC 1.0 signal to ATSC 3.0 (NextGen TV) broadcasting. The station's ATSC 1.0 subchannels were moved to other broadcasters for simulcasting, while KSAT-TV became the "lighthouse" host for the ATSC 3.0 transmission of KENS, KLRN, KSAT-TV, KWEX-DT and KVDA.

Subchannels of KSAT-TV (ATSC 3.0)
Subchannel	Programming
5.1	CBS (KENS)
9.1	PBS (KLRN)
12.1	ABC
41.1	Univision (KWEX-DT)
60.1	Telemundo (KVDA)

Subchannel broadcast with digital rights management
