= Leslie Mouton =

American journalist

Leslie Mouton (born 1965) is a television news anchor and public speaker.

Mouton was the co-anchor of Good Morning San Antonio between 4:30 a.m-7:00 a.m. for KSAT-TV news, the ABC affiliate in San Antonio, Texas. She has been a broadcast journalist since 1988 and has worked at KSAT since 1999.

In October 2000, at the age of 35, Mouton was discovered with a very aggressive form of breast cancer. She allowed cameras to follow her during the entire treatment process which included surgery, chemotherapy and radiation therapy.

Mouton anchored a newscast without her wig on in order to reveal the hair loss that had resulted from the treatment process. The resulting attention landed Mouton on Good Morning America, Weekend Today, and Oprah. Newspapers worldwide as well as television programs Inside Edition and Primetime featured stories about her struggle.

Her story is included in the book The Breast Cancer Book of Strength and Courage which features individual chapters written by survivors. A PBS documentary on the book features Mouton and her family.

Mouton resigned from KSAT in June 2020, and in January 2021 joined Morgan's Wonderland Inclusion Foundation, a nonprofit organization designed to create equitable opportunities for people with disabilities.
