= Kōno =

Kōno, Kono or Kouno (written: 河野, 幸野, 高野 or 甲野) is a Japanese surname. Notable people with the surname include:

- Kōno Bairei (1844–1895), Japanese painter, book illustrator and art teacher
- Kōno Hironaka (1849–1923), Japanese politician and cabinet minister in the Empire of Japan
- Kōno Togama (1844–1895), prewar Japanese politician and cabinet minister
- Akitake Kōno (1911–1978), Japanese film actor.
- Asahachi Kōno (1876–1943), Japanese photographer
- Fumiyo Kōno (born 1968), Japanese manga artist
- Fusako Kōno (born 1916), former Japanese diver
- Hiromichi Kono (1905–1963), Japanese anthropologist and entomologist
- Hyōichi Kōno (1958–2001), Japanese adventurer
- Kohei Kono (born 1980), Japanese professional boxer
- Marika Kōno (born 1994), Japanese voice actress and singer
- Masayuki Kono (born 1980), Japanese professional wrestler and mixed martial artist
- Mitsuru Kono (河野 満), Japanese table tennis player
- Rin Kono (born 1981), Japanese professional Go player
- Shunji Kōno (born 1964), Japanese politician
- Shuto Kohno (born 1993), Japanese football player
- Taeko Kōno (1926–2015), Japanese writer and critic
- Takanori Kono (born 1969), former Japanese Nordic combined skier
- Taro Kono (born 1963), Japanese politician, son of Yōhei Kōno
- Tensei Kono (1935–2012), Japanese science fiction writer
- Tetsuya Kono and Nahoko Kono, passengers on Comair Flight 191
- Tommy Kono (1930–2016), Japanese-American Olympic weightlifter
- Tomoyuki Kōno (born 1971), Japanese voice actor
- Tōru Kōno (1907–1984), Japanese photographer
- Yōhei Kōno (1937–2026), Speaker of the Japanese House of Representatives, father of Tarō Kōno
- Yoshiyuki Kono, Japanese voice actor

== See also ==
- Kono (disambiguation)
