= Christus Santa Rosa Health System =

Health care organization in South Texas

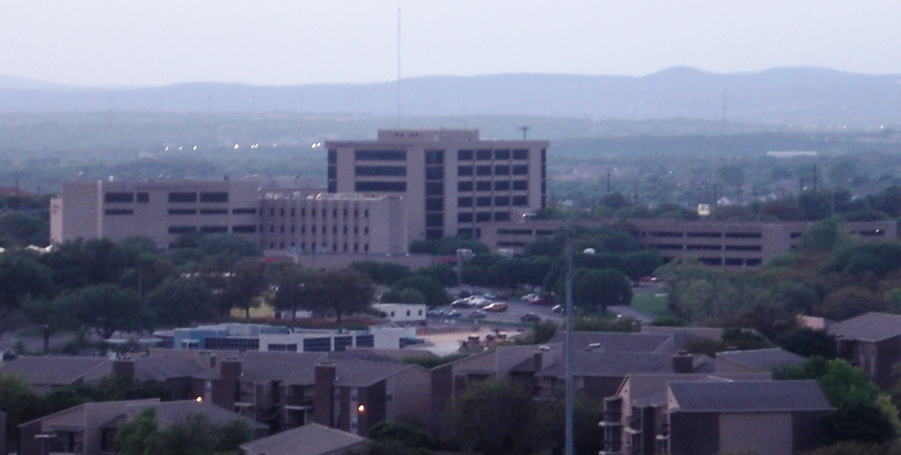
View of the CSRHC main campus, located at the South Texas Medical Center

Christus Santa Rosa Health System, or Christus Santa Rosa Health Care (CSRHC), is a health care organization in South Texas. Established in 1869, CSRHC is a part of Christus Health and is the only faith-based, not-for-profit health care system in San Antonio.

Centered at the South Texas Medical Center, CSRHC has hospitals located on four campuses in the San Antonio area, as well as several primary care and specialty health clinics, and an array of community outreach services. The five hospitals in operation under the CSRHC system include, Children's Hospital of San Antonio (located in Downtown San Antonio), Christus Santa Rosa Hospital-Medical Center (Medical Center), Christus Santa Rosa Hospital-Westover Hills (located on San Antonio's Westside), and Christus Santa Rosa Hospital-New Braunfels (located in New Braunfels, 30 miles northeast of Downtown San Antonio). In 2020, CSRHC acquired the hospital formerly known as Central Texas Medical Center in San Marcos, Texas, and has since rebranded the hospital as Christus Santa Rosa- San Marcos.
