= KCYY =

- San Antonio, Texas; United States
- Broadcast area: San Antonio metropolitan area
- Frequency: 100.3 MHz (HD Radio)
- Branding: Y100

Programming
- Language: English
- Format: Country music
- Subchannels: HD2: Classic country (KKYX)

Ownership
- Owner: Cox Media Group; (CMG NY/Texas Radio, LLC)
- Sister stations: KISS-FM; KKYX; KONO; KONO-FM; KSMG; KTKX

History
- First air date: June 25, 1966
- Former call signs: KBER-FM (1966–1974); KSAQ (1974–1976); KZZY (1976–1978); KCCW (1979–1981); KLLS (1981–1983); KLLS-FM (1983–1987)
- Call sign meaning: Country Y100

Technical information
- Licensing authority: FCC
- Facility ID: 48718
- Class: C0
- ERP: 100,000 watts
- HAAT: 300 meters (980 ft)
- Transmitter coordinates: 29°31′25″N 98°43′25″W

Links
- Public license information: Public file; LMS
- Webcast: Listen live Listen live (via Audacy)
- Website: www.y100fm.com

KCYY (100.3 FM) is a commercial radio station in San Antonio, Texas. It is owned by Cox Media Group and airs a country music radio format. Studios and offices are on Datapoint Drive in San Antonio.

KCYY has an effective radiated power (ERP) of 100,000 watts, the maximum for non-grandfathered FM stations. The transmitter site is near Farm to Market Road 1560 and Galm Road in the Far West Side of San Antonio, near Government Canyon State Natural Area.

== History ==
=== KBER-FM, KSAQ, KCCW ===
On June 25, 1966, the station signed on as KBER-FM. It was owned by Kepo Broadcasting and was the FM counterpart of KBER (1150 AM). Because KBER AM was a daytime-only station, its country music programming continued on KBER-FM into the night.

In 1974, KBER-AM-FM were sold to Pacific Western Broadcasting. The call signs were changed to KQAM for the AM station and KSAQ for the FM station, also known as "Q-100". The two simulcast a Top 40 format. In 1976, the AM station was sold to a Spanish-language broadcaster, while the FM station was sold to Radio Alamo. Radio Alamo switched the call letters to KZZY, initially keeping the Top 40 sound. But then it briefly tried a country format as KCCW. The country music lasted less than a year.

=== Class FM ===
In 1981, Radio Alamo flipped the format to adult contemporary music. Radio Alamo also acquired AM 930 in Terrell Hills (now KLUP) and simulcast both stations, as KLLS and KLLS-FM, "Class FM".

In 1987, Newcity Communications acquired KKYX (680 AM) and KLLS-FM 100.3.

=== Country KCYY ===
KKYX had been owned by Swanson Communications, running a classic country format. So when it was paired with KLLS-FM, Newcity made the decision to also play country music on the FM, but a more contemporary version. The call sign was changed to KCYY, with the CY standing for "country" and the additional Y as the moniker of the station, "Y100". San Antonio already had an FM country station that had been doing well in the ratings, KAJA, owned by Clear Channel Communications. Another country station was KBUC-FM, but its ratings were not a factor, and it eventually flipped to Tejano as KXTN-FM.

Newcity thought there were enough country fans in San Antonio for two healthy FM country outlets. KCYY premiered by playing 10,000 songs in a row with no commercials. Backed by the commercial-free weeks and TV ads, KCYY became San Antonio's top country station in Spring 1988. KCYY was also the top station in the 18- to 49-year-old demographic and the 25-54 demographic, according to the Arbitron ratings.

Cox Radio acquired KCYY and KKYX in 1997. Since the late 1980s, KCYY and KAJA have see-sawed in the ratings, with both stations often in the top five in the San Antonio market.
