= Greehey Children's Cancer Research Institute =

Research center in San Antonio, Texas, USA

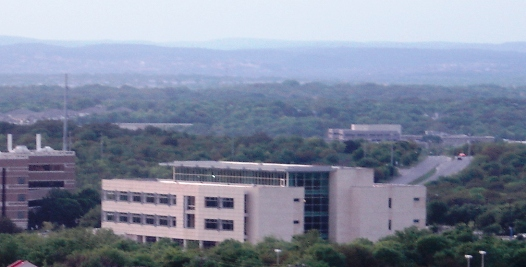
Greehey CCRI is a part of the UTHSCSA.

The Greehey Children's Cancer Research Institute is a research center in San Antonio, Texas, US.

The institute was established in 1999 under a $200,000,000 endowment from the State of Texas tobacco settlement, at the time the largest single oncology endowment in US history. The $50 million facility was completed in 2004. The facility is part of the University of Texas Health Science Center at San Antonio.

== See also ==
- South Texas Medical Center
