= Baptist Health System School of Health Professions =

Coordinates: 29°31′01.2″N 98°34′02.9″W

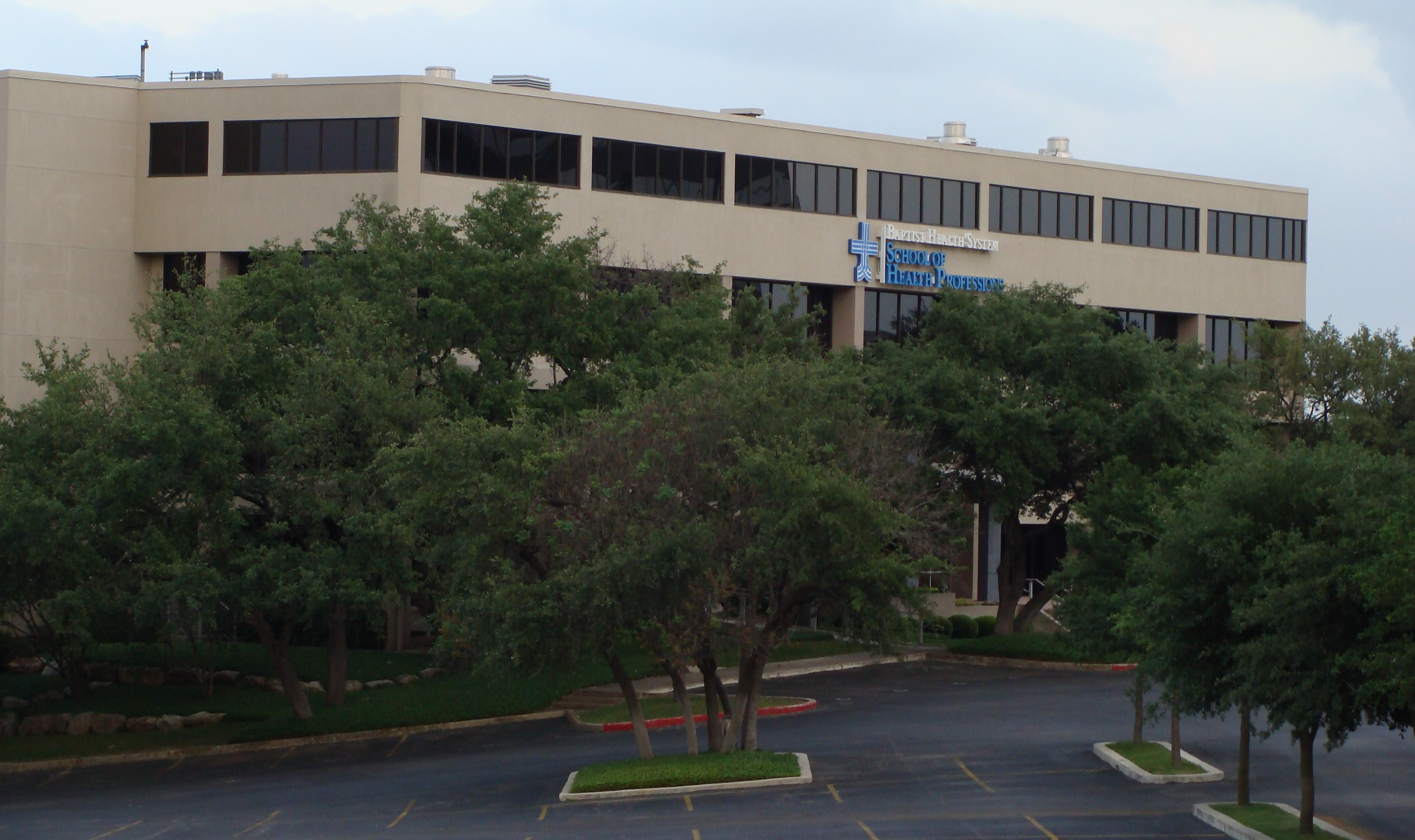

The Baptist Health System School of Health Professions evolved from a private network of health science schools sponsored by the Baptist Health System located at the South Texas Medical Center in San Antonio, Texas.

== History ==
The School of Nursing was the first school, chartered in 1903. Surgical Technology followed in 1955, Medical Imaging Technology in 1959, and Vocational Nursing in 1988. In 2009, the first graduates were awarded the Associate of Applied Science in Nursing, ushering in a new era for the school. In 2010, the school was approved to offer the Associate of Applied Science in Radiologic Technology and the Associate of Applied Science in Surgical Technology. Also in 2010, the school offered the first fully online courses in the Magnetic Resonance Imaging program, followed in 2011 by a second fully online program, Advanced Certificate in Computed Tomography. The school was approved at the baccalaureate level to offer the RN to BSN in 2012 and the Bachelor of Science in Healthcare Management in 2013, both of which are fully online. In 2016, the Associate of Applied Science in Radiologic Technology and the Associate of Applied Science in Diagnostic Medical Sonography were approved for both resident and fully online delivery. The newest program and the first graduate program, the Master of Science in Nursing with a concentration in Nursing Administration, was approved for online delivery in 2017.

Baptist Health System has a reputation for graduating highly competent and caring health care professionals. Graduates will enter the dynamic health care environment at a time when their knowledge and skills are highly valued.

The School of Health Professions is a master, baccalaureate, and associate degree-granting institution and the premier education component of the Baptist Health System. The Baptist Health System School of Health Professions comprises the following academic departments and the Bruce A. Garrett Medical Library:

- General Education
- Medical Imaging Technology
- Professional Nursing
- Surgical Technology
- Vocational Nursing and Healthcare Management
