= KNAF-FM =

- Fredericksburg, Texas; United States
- Frequency: 105.7 MHz
- Branding: "The Deuce"

Programming
- Format: Country
- Affiliations: KNAF, KFAN-FM

Ownership
- Owner: J. & J. Fritz Media, Ltd.
- Sister stations: KEEP

History
- First air date: 1996

Technical information
- Licensing authority: FCC
- Facility ID: 83212
- Class: C3
- ERP: 9,100 watts
- HAAT: 164.0 meters (538.1 ft)
- Transmitter coordinates: 30°21′49″N 98°54′47″W

Links
- Public license information: Public file; LMS

KNAF-FM (105.7 FM) is an American radio station broadcasting a country music format and licensed to the Fredericksburg, Texas area. It is owned by J. & J. Fritz Media, Ltd.

The station was assigned the call letters KNAF-FM on August 26, 1996. On December 10, 2003, the station changed its call sign to just KNAF. On December 24, 2003, the station was sold.

The station has no live on-air DJs during the broadcast day, except for the morning show.
