= KLRN =

Television station in San Antonio

- San Antonio, Texas; United States
- Channels: Digital: 9 (VHF); Virtual: 9
- Branding: KLRN

Programming
- Affiliations: 9.1: PBS; for others, see § Subchannels

Ownership
- Owner: Alamo Public Telecommunications Council

History
- First air date: September 10, 1962
- Former channel numbers: Analog: 9 (VHF, 1962–2009); Digital: 8 (VHF, until 2009)
- Former affiliations: NET (1962–1970)
- Call sign meaning: "Learn"

Technical information
- Licensing authority: FCC
- Facility ID: 749
- ERP: 28 kW
- HAAT: 286 m (938 ft)
- Transmitter coordinates: 29°19′38″N 98°21′17″W

Links
- Public license information: Public file; LMS
- Website: www.klrn.org

KLRN (channel 9) is a PBS member television station in San Antonio, Texas, United States. It is owned by the Alamo Public Telecommunications Council, with studios at the Charline McCombs Media Center on Broadway Street in downtown San Antonio and a transmitter on Foster Road (near Calaveras Lake) in the southeast part of the city.

KLRN is the default PBS member station for the Laredo and Victoria markets (it shares Victoria with KUHT in Houston), which do not have their own. It is on cable and satellite television in all three markets.

Established in 1962 as an educational television station designed to serve San Antonio and Austin, the opening of a new transmitter in Austin led to the establishment of local governance and ultimately a separation of operations during the 1980s, leaving KLRN open to focus on serving San Antonio viewers.

== History ==
=== Bringing educational TV to San Antonio ===
The earliest attempt to activate channel 9, San Antonio's educational television allocation, came in 1953 when a group called the San Antonio Council for Educational Television applied for a new television license to operate on the channel. The proposed station intended to broadcast four hours a night. The council needed to raise $130,000 to get on-air, according to Trinity University's Leon Taylor, who helped promote the council. Commercial stations WOAI-TV and KEYL-TV offered to help cover a portion of the costs of equipment and programming, presumably so that channel 9 would not be taken by a possible new commercial competitor.

=== Educational TV for a dual market ===
But it was not until the University of Texas at Austin got involved that there was sufficient funding. This led to a plan to build channel 9 midway between San Antonio and Austin. By June 1960, San Antonio had raised $300,000, with Austin having secured $71,000 of its $100,000 goal; and the Southwest Texas Educational Television Council applied on June 21, 1960, for a construction permit for channel 9. The Federal Communications Commission (FCC) approved the application on September 28, with the station to have studios in San Antonio and at UT–Austin. The transmitter would be built between New Braunfels and San Marcos, roughly equidistant from both cities, and UT would assist in construction and operations, though state statute prevented it from using government funding. The permit initially bore the call letters KAIQ before KLRN was selected at the start of 1961.

Ground was broken in November 1961 on the transmitter facility, but construction was beset by equipment delays. Commercial stations KTBC-TV in Austin and KONO-TV in San Antonio stepped in to air the planned schools programs that were ready to go in April and already had subscribing schools representing 186,000 students. By early August, all of the necessary gear had been delivered, including the transmitter purchased from KONO-TV, broadcasting got underway on September 10, 1962.

KLRN's transmitter was located roughly halfway between San Antonio and Austin on land located just north of New Braunfels, a major suburb of San Antonio. The station's main studios were located at the Jesse H. Jones Communications Center on rented space at UT–Austin. Its San Antonio operations were based at a satellite studio located at Cambridge Elementary School until 1968, when it moved to rented space at the Institute of Texan Cultures on the HemisFair grounds.

Most of KLRN's schedule was carried by fellow PBS station KEDT in Corpus Christi, which had separate ownership from KLRN, during that station's first few years, following its sign-on in October 1972. Because of this arrangement, KLRN was also available to cable providers in the Lower Rio Grande Valley, some 250 miles (402 km) from San Antonio.

=== Becoming a San Antonio station ===
The dual-market plan persisted for more than 15 years, but by the mid-1970s, plans were in motion to set up a proper transmitter in Austin on its reserved channel 18. Reception in Austin had been poorer than expected due to hilly terrain, and reception in several close-in suburbs in Travis and Williamson was poor or nonexistent from the New Braunfels site. In 1978, KLRN began a public fundraising drive to raise the money to build a satellite station in Austin, KLRU. Its construction added 100,000 homes in Austin's inner ring to KLRN's footprint and enabled 23 additional school districts in the KLRN service area to benefit from the station's educational programming. The transmitter was activated on April 24, 1979, and programs began May 4. Born at a time when its ownership was embroiled in other controversies involving operations, KLRU's first license was only for one year due to misrepresentations over matching donations during the fund drive.

From the moment KLRU signed on, officials envisioned a future in which KLRN and KLRU were separate, locally-focused PBS member stations. Only a year after KLRU hit the airwaves, it received its own Austin-based governing board, though it continued under the ownership of the Southwest Texas Public Broadcasting Council. On April 9, 1984, KLRN's current $2 million tower came online. Located near other San Antonio stations, it helped to improve reception for area viewers and reduced duplication of service to KLRU. Two years later, for financial reasons, officials began exploring an outright split of the two stations. The split was approved in September 1986 and took place in two stages. Separate branding for both stations was instituted on October 1, 1986. In 1987, the two stations officially went their separate ways when the Southwest Texas Public Broadcasting Council split into two nonprofit organizations, with KLRN coming under the ownership of the Alamo Public Broadcasting Council.

Newly separate from KLRU, KLRN began to look for a new, larger facility in which to operate, with station officials noting that the Institute of Texan Cultures space was growing to be too cramped for what had expanded into a 50 person staff. This culminated in the January 1992 purchase of the 32,000-square-foot (2,973 m^{2}) Spires Leasing Corp. building on Broadway Street, which had once been Spires' now-defunct Buick dealership. Station officials launched a $4 million renovation plan that would also add two new production studios to the existing building. KLRN moved in to the building in February 1994 following the expiration of its lease with the ITC.

== Programming ==
KLRN news bulletin slide, 1966

Some of the notable programs produced (in the Austin studio) by KLRN over the years included Carrascolendas and Villa Alegre, both bilingual children's programs about Latino culture that aired during the 1970s. KLRN also produced Austin City Limits until 1984, when KLRU split off into a separate station from KLRN and took over production responsibilities for that program.

KLRN, whose studios were right across the street from the Main Building of the University of Texas in Austin, interrupted programming to show live coverage of Charles Whitman's shooting spree on August 1, 1966.

== Technical information ==
=== Subchannels ===
The station's digital signal is multiplexed:

Subchannels of KLRN
Subchannel	Res.	Short name	Programming
9.1	1080i	KLRN9.1	PBS
9.2	480i	KLRN9.2	World
9.3	480i	KLRNKD	PBS Kids
9.4	480i	KLRN9.4	Create
12.1	720p	KSAT-HD	ABC (KSAT-TV)
12.3	480i	Movies!	Movies! (KSAT-TV)

Broadcast on behalf of another station

=== Analog-to-digital conversion ===
KLRN ended regular programming on its analog signal, over VHF channel 9, on June 12, 2009, the official date on which full-power television stations in the United States transitioned from analog to digital broadcasts under federal mandate. The station's digital signal relocated from its pre-transition VHF channel 8 to channel 9.
