= KGNB =

- New Braunfels, Texas; United States
- Broadcast area: San Antonio area
- Frequency: 1420 kHz
- Branding: KGNB 1420 AM

Programming
- Format: Country
- Affiliations: Fox News Radio

Ownership
- Owner: New Braunfels Communications, Inc.
- Sister stations: KNBT

History
- First air date: May 22, 1950
- Call sign meaning: Greater New Braunfels

Technical information
- Licensing authority: FCC
- Facility ID: 48378
- Class: D
- Power: 1,000 watts (day); 196 watts (night)
- Transmitter coordinates: 29°39′45″N 98°10′29″W
- Translator: 103.1 K276GR (New Braunfels)

Links
- Public license information: Public file; LMS
- Webcast: Listen live
- Website: radionb.com/kgnb

KGNB (1420 AM) is a radio station broadcasting a country music format. Licensed to New Braunfels, Texas, United States, station serves the San Antonio area. The station is currently owned by New Braunfels Communications, Inc. and features programming from Fox News Radio.

== History ==
KGNB was initially proposed by the Comal Broadcasting Company in January 1949. A construction permit was granted to build a 1 kilowatt daytime facility on the east side of U.S. Highway 81, 2 miles east of the city limits of New Braunfels. The studio location was originally located at 186 Castell in New Braunfels.

The facility was constructed and received a License to Cover from the Federal Communications Commission on May 22, 1950.

== Translator ==
Broadcast translator for KGNB
Call sign	Frequency	City of license	FID	ERP (W)	HAAT	Class	Transmitter coordinates	FCC info
K276GR	103.1 FM	New Braunfels, Texas	203076	250	74 m (243 ft)	D	29°43′50.20″N 98°7′12″W	LMS

Former logo
