= KEEP =

Coordinates: 29°51′21″N 99°5′26″W

- Bandera, Texas; United States
- Frequency: 103.1 MHz
- Branding: The Deuce

Programming
- Format: Country (KNAF-FM simulcast)

Ownership
- Owner: J. & J. Fritz Media, Ltd.
- Sister stations: KFAN-FM, KNAF-FM

History
- First air date: April 28, 1981 (as KQRK)
- Former call signs: KQRK (1981–1984); KHLC (1984–1993)

Technical information
- Licensing authority: FCC
- Facility ID: 30106
- Class: A
- ERP: 3,500 watts
- HAAT: 131 meters

Links
- Public license information: Public file; LMS
- Website: texasrebelradio.com

KEEP is a commercially supported FM radio station serving the general area of Fredericksburg, Texas, due west of Austin and due north of San Antonio. KEEP is owned by J & J Fritz Media and is broadcast from Johnson City, Texas. It was one of four member stations of the Texas Rebel Radio Network which supplies Texas music programming. This programming is available as streaming audio via the KEEP/Texas Rebel Radio website.

On June 24, 2011, KEEP, after three months of silence, returned to the air simulcasting country-formatted KNAF-FM 105.7.
