= KNBT =

Radio station in New Braunfels, Texas

New Braunfels, Texas; United States
- Broadcast area: San Antonio area
- Frequency: 92.1 MHz
- Branding: Radio New Braunfels

Programming
- Format: Americana

Ownership
- Owner: New Braunfels Communications, Inc.
- Sister stations: KGNB

History
- Call sign meaning: New Braunfels, Texas

Technical information
- Licensing authority: FCC
- Facility ID: 48377
- Class: A
- ERP: 6,000 watts
- HAAT: 95.0 meters
- Transmitter coordinates: 29°43′50.00″N 98°7′12.00″W

Links
- Public license information: Public file; LMS
- Website: RadioNB.com/knbt

KNBT (92.1 FM) is a radio station broadcasting an Americana music format. Licensed to New Braunfels, Texas, United States, the station serves the San Antonio area. The station is the longtime home of the New Braunfels Unicorns high school football team. The station is currently owned by New Braunfels Communications, Inc.

The station is a pioneer in the genre of Americana music since adopting the format in the mid-1990s.

The station also hosts frequent live concerts in studio, as well as a weekly show "Roots & Branches of Americana" hosted by Ray Wylie Hubbard.
