= University Health =

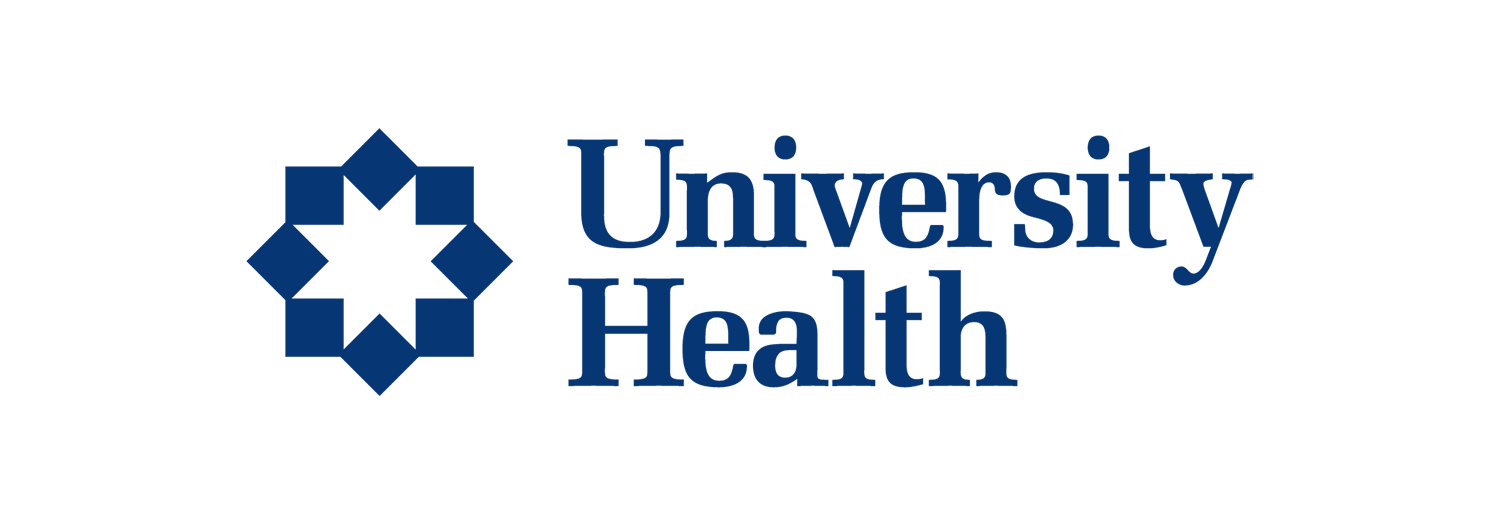

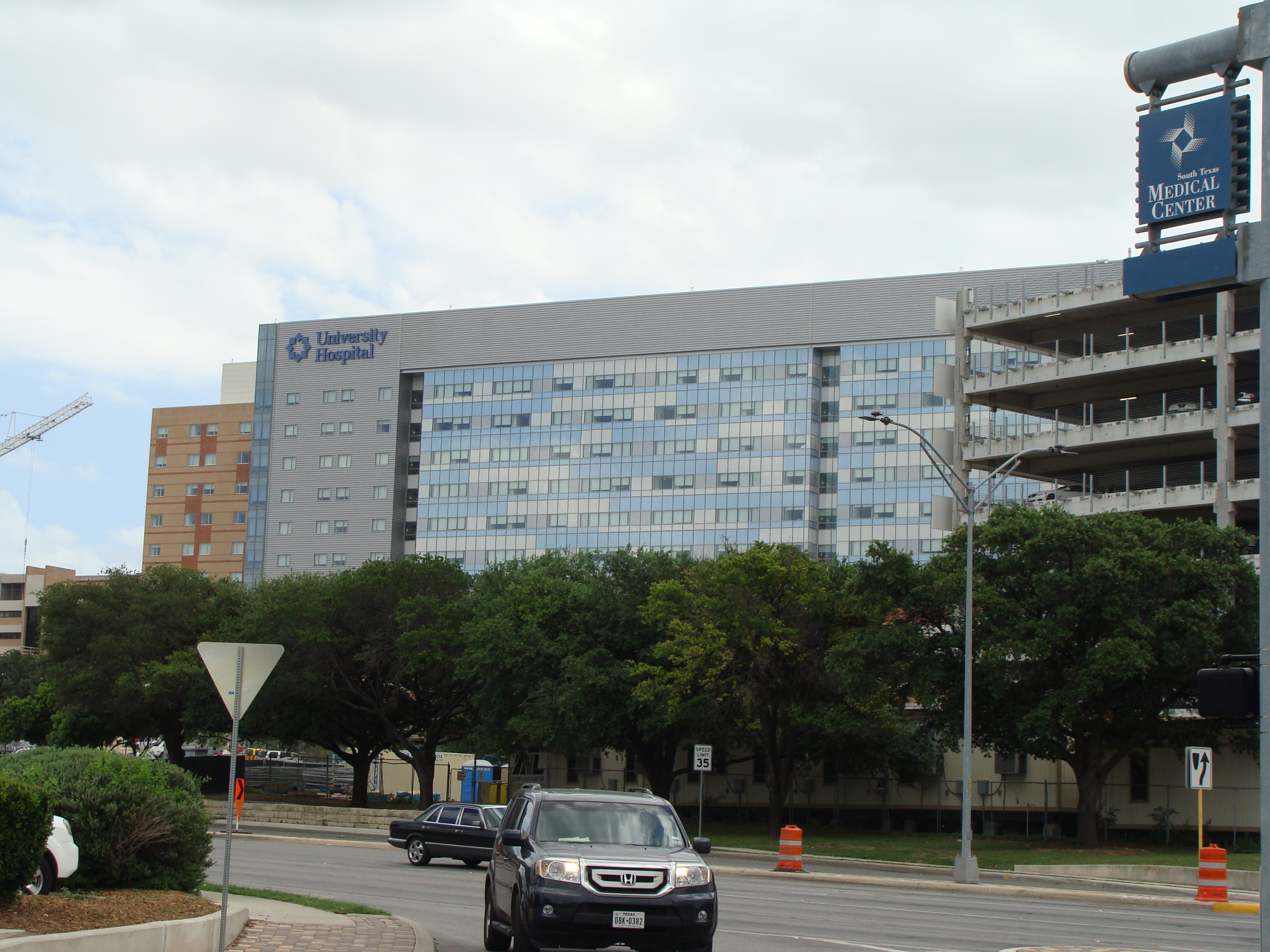

Geography
- Location: San Antonio, Texas, United States
- Coordinates: 29.506632°N 98.576873°W

Organization
- Type: Teaching
- Affiliated university: University of Texas Health Science Center at San Antonio
- Network: University Health System

Services
- Emergency department: Level I trauma center
- Beds: 716

Helipads
- Helipad: FAA LID: XS85

History
- Former name: Robert B. Green Memorial Hospital
- Opened: 1917 (Original) 1968 (Current)

Links
- Website: universityhealth.com
- Lists: Hospitals in Texas

Bexar County Hospital District, doing business as University Health, is the public hospital district for the San Antonio, Texas, US metropolitan area. Owned and operated by Bexar County, it is the third largest public health system in Texas. The system operates University Hospital, a 716-bed teaching hospital located in the South Texas Medical Center, and over 35 outpatient specialty and family medicine clinics throughout the San Antonio area.

== History ==
San Antonio's first public hospital, The Robert B. Green Memorial Hospital, opened in 1917 on the west side of what is now downtown San Antonio. The hospital suffered from inconsistent funding over the years, so in 1955, voters approved the creation of a hospital district and a property tax to provide a stable funding source for it. In 1959, the new hospital district was leveraged to promise a teaching hospital to attract the University of Texas South Texas Medical School, now the University of Texas Health Science Center at San Antonio. The hospital district broke ground in 1965 for the Bexar County Teaching Hospital, now University Hospital, adjacent to the site for the new medical school on a former hundred acre dairy farm located about 9 miles northwest of downtown San Antonio in what is now the heart of the South Texas Medical Center. Both the hospital and medical school opened in 1968.

The hospital district began using the name University Health in 1994. The primary hospital became known as University Hospital.

In 2014, the hospital was expanded to its current state with the completion of the Sky Tower, which contains the main entrance of the hospital.

As the primary teaching hospital for the University of Texas Health Science Center at San Antonio, University Hospital is a regional Level I Trauma Center and a leader in organ transplantation.

== Expansion ==
=== New Women's & Children's Hospital ===
The Women's & Children's Hospital opened on the University Health Main Campus in 2023 as a 300-bed hospital dedicated to women, newborn, and pediatric care. It's the first hospital in South Texas devoted exclusively to those populations.

The hospital houses a Level IV Neonatal Intensive Care Unit (NICU) and a Level IV Maternal Center for high-risk obstetric and neonatal care and became San Antonio's first Level IV maternal center. Facilities include labor and delivery suites, postpartum rooms, cesarean operating rooms and a Women's Center for obstetric and gynecologic emergencies.

It also includes a children's emergency department, pediatric specialty services and pediatric rehabilitation facilities.

The project included expanded heart, vascular, and endoscopy space, a parking structure and shell space for future expansion.

University Health is the only San Antonio hospital to be named to Newsweek's national raking of Best Maternity Hospital's for 2022-2025. U.S. News & World Report named University Health a 2022-2025 High Performing Maternity Care Hospital. Leapfrog/Money also lists University Health as one of the nation's Best Hospitals for Maternity Care.

=== New South Side hospital ===
University Health Palo Alto Hospital is under construction on San Antonio’s South Side. It will be on a 68-acre campus at the intersection of South Zarzamora Street and Jaguar Parkway, across from Texas A&M University–San Antonio. It's part of University Health’s outreach to underserved regions of Bexar County. Groundbreaking for the hospital happened on January 18, 2024.

The five-story hospital is designed to open in 2027 with 166 inpatient beds. It will be able to expand to 286 beds as community needs grow. It will feature a 24/7 emergency department, labor and delivery suites, a neonatal intensive care unit (NICU), operating rooms, radiology and laboratory services, and inpatient units for medical and surgical care. Next to the hospital, a 100,000-square-foot medical office building will house outpatient clinics and specialty care services.

The Palo Alto campus will also include University Health Vida, a three-story, 60,000-square-foot multi-specialty health center and the new headquarters for the University Health Institute for Public Health. Opened in the fall of 2026, Vida offers primary care, mental health services, women’s health, and preventive care, with a focus on social determinants of health.

This development is a large investment in healthcare for the South Side, especially after the closure of Texas Vista Medical Center. The project is part of a broader $900 million expansion by University Health to bring care closer to residents throughout the San Antonio area.

=== New hospital in Selma ===
University Health Retama Hospital will be a community hospital in Selma, Texas, along the I-35 corridor north of Loop 1604. The facility will help University Health reach quickly growing areas in northeastern Bexar County. Groundbreaking for the hospital took place on February 21, 2024.

The hospital will be a four-story, 604,561-square-foot facility with 140 inpatient beds at opening, and the capacity to expand to 286 beds to accommodate future growth. It will offer a 24/7 emergency department, labor and delivery unit, neonatal intensive care unit (NICU), operating rooms, radiology, lab, pharmacy services, and inpatient units for medical and surgical care.

An adjoining 100,000-square-foot medical office building will house outpatient services, including family medicine and a variety of medical and surgical specialties.

The Retama Hospital is slated to open in 2027, aligning with University Health’s goal to decentralize care and bring services closer to patients’ homes.

== See also ==
- University of Texas Health Science Center at San Antonio
- South Texas Medical Center
