= KAHL (AM) =

Radio station in San Antonio, Texas

San Antonio, Texas; United States
- Frequency: 1310 kHz
- Branding: Call 1310

Programming
- Language: English
- Format: Adult standards

Ownership
- Owner: Pearsall Radio Works, Ltd.; (San Antonio Radio Works, L.L.C.)
- Sister stations: KAHL-FM

History
- First air date: 1971
- Former call signs: KBUC (1971–1988); KXTN (1988–1991, 1993-1997, 1999-2005); KZVE (1991–1993); KONJ (1993); KPOZ (1997–1999)
- Call sign meaning: spoken as "call", the station's name

Technical information
- Licensing authority: FCC
- Facility ID: 67070
- Class: B
- Power: 5,000 watts day 280 watts night
- Transmitter coordinates: 29°24′53″N 98°20′36″W
- Translators: 107.9 K300DY (San Antonio); 105.9 K290BO (The Dominion); 100.7 K264CJ (Live Oak)

Links
- Public license information: Public file; LMS
- Website: call1310.com

KAHL (1310 AM) is a radio station broadcasting an adult standards format. Licensed to San Antonio, Texas, United States, the station serves the San Antonio area. The station is currently owned by Pearsall Radio Works, Ltd.

== Translators ==
Broadcast translators for KAHL
Call sign	Frequency	City of license	FID	ERP (W)	HAAT	Class	FCC info
K300DY	107.9 FM	San Antonio, Texas	6147	220	186 m (610 ft)	D	LMS
K290BO	105.9 FM	The Dominion (San Antonio)	139129	74	28 m (92 ft)	D	LMS
K264CJ	100.7 FM	Live Oak, Texas	156293	250	160 m (525 ft)	D	LMS

== History ==
The station was assigned the callsign KZVE on April 15, 1991. On January 15, 1993, the station changed its call sign to KONJ; on July 9, 1993, the callsign changed to KXTN; another callsign change occurred on March 1, 1997 to KPOZ; changing again on January 15, 1999 to KXTN, and on March 1, 2005 to the current KAHL.
