= KAHL-FM =

Radio station in Hondo–San Antonio, Texas

Simulcast with KAHL San Antonio
- Hondo, Texas; United States
- Frequency: 105.9 MHz
- Branding: Call 1310

Programming
- Format: Adult standards

Ownership
- Owner: Hondo Radioworks, Ltd.

History
- First air date: November 29, 1989
- Former call signs: KRBH (1989–2001); KRIO-FM (2001–2002); KMFR (2002–2011)
- Call sign meaning: Similar to "call"

Technical information
- Licensing authority: FCC
- Facility ID: 21674
- Class: A
- ERP: 6,000 watts
- HAAT: 100 meters (330 ft)
- Transmitter coordinates: 29°18′48″N 99°16′3″W

Links
- Public license information: Public file; LMS
- Website: call1310.com

KAHL-FM (105.9 FM) is a radio station broadcasting an adult standards format, simulcasting KAHL 1310 AM San Antonio, Texas. Licensed to Hondo, Texas, United States. The station is currently owned by Hondo Radioworks, Ltd. The transmitter site is west of Hondo, or south of the town of D'Hanis in Medina County.

== History ==
The station went on the air as KRBH on November 29, 1989. On April 17, 2001, the station changed its call sign to KMFR. On September 11, 2002, it changed to KRIO-FM; on April 12, 2004 to KMFR; & on September 22, 2011 to the current KAHL-FM.

On December 23, 2008, industry website 100000watts.com reported that KMFR's translator in San Antonio, 103.7 had gone silent, though no explanation for this was given.

As of December 25, 2009 or a little while sooner, KMFR's translator on 103.7 became KAHL's translator playing adult standards, while KMFR continued with classic rock.

On September 22, 2011 KMFR changed its callsign to KAHL-FM and changed formats to adult standards, simulcasting KAHL 1310 AM San Antonio, Texas.
