= Asahachi Kōno =

Japanese photographer

Asahachi Kōno (河野 浅八, Kōno Asahachi; こうの あさはち, 1876–1943) was a Japanese photographer. He was active between the mid-1920s and mid-1930s, and was a member of Los Angeles's Japanese Camera Pictorialists of California. Before returning to Japan, he worked as a photo retoucher.
