= WTSH =

WTSH may refer to:

- WTSH-FM, a radio station in Georgia, United States
- Tung Wah Group of Hospitals Wong Tai Sin Hospital, a hospital in Wong Tai Sin, Hong Kong
