= KSLR =

Radio station in San Antonio, Texas

- San Antonio, Texas; United States
- Broadcast area: San Antonio metropolitan area
- Frequency: 630 kHz
- Branding: AM 630 The Word

Programming
- Format: Christian radio
- Affiliations: Salem Radio Network

Ownership
- Owner: Salem Media Group; (Salem Media of Texas, Inc.)
- Sister stations: KLUP

History
- First air date: December 1926
- Former call signs: KMAC (1926–1983)
- Call sign meaning: "SonLight Radio", former name

Technical information
- Licensing authority: FCC
- Facility ID: 58634
- Class: B
- Power: 5,000 watts (day); 4,300 watts (night)
- Transmitter coordinates: 29°23′29″N 98°21′0″W (day); 29°31′50″N 98°7′13″W (night)

Links
- Public license information: Public file; LMS
- Webcast: Listen live
- Website: am630theword.com

KSLR (630 AM) is a commercial radio station licensed to San Antonio, Texas, United States, and serving the Greater San Antonio area. Owned by the Salem Media Group, it airs a Christian format. The studios and offices are on McAllister Freeway in San Antonio.

KSLR's transmitter is situated off Rigsby Avenue (U.S. Route 87) in China Grove.

== History ==
- December 1926: the station signs on as KMAC. It broadcasts at 100 watts on 1370 kHz, sharing time with KONO.
- 1941: With the enactment of NARBA, KMAC moves to 1240, powered at 250 watts.
- 1948: KMAC moves to 630 kHz, powered at 5,000 watts and carrying programming from the Mutual Broadcasting System.
- 1975: Salem Communications purchases KMFM on FM 96.1 and Mel Taylor is hired as GM.
- 1977: John Walk is hired as KMFM's program director and hosts daily music show.
- 1982: KMFM changes call sign to KSLR-FM and becomes known as SonLight Radio. Car window stickers displaying the new call letters are given away throughout San Antonio.
- 1983: Salem Radio purchases KMAC – Mel Tailor GM, John Walk program director. Salem sells the KSLR-FM, with those call letters moving to AM. KMAC's call sign changes to KSLR. Roy Butler hired for music shift.
- 1988: Salem sold KSLR to Communicom Corporation of America based in Denver. Bob Lepine GM, Mary Dockery GSM, John Walk Operations Mgr.
- September 1990: Dave Gordon is hired as program director.
- July 1992: Bob Lepine resigns and joins Family Life Today with Dennis Rainey. Carl Dean is hired as GM, John Walk debuts as host of "Crosscurrents," a daily one-hour talk show.
- 1993: Mary Dockery resigns as GSM.
- August 1994: Salem re-acquires KSLR, Carl Dean stays with Communicom of America. John Walk promoted to interim GM.
- January 1995: John Walk resigns after 18 years with KSLR. Jeff Crabtree becomes new GM.
- July 1997: Jeff Crabtree resigns, Dave Gordon promoted to interim GM. Adam Macmanus talk show debuts on KSLR.
- February 1998: Mary Dockery is hired as GSM.
- July 1998: Dave Gordon resigns as GM, Mary Dockery is promoted to GM.
- 1999: Pat Rogers is hired.
- February 2000: Dave Gordon is hired as OM.
- September 2000: Salem acquires 930 KLUP, Pat Rogers assigned to morning show.
- January 2002: Sonny Melendrez is hired for KLUP.
- February 2002: Mary Dockery resigns, Dave Gordon is promoted to GM.
- July 2002: Pat Rodgers resigns, Sonny Melendrez hosts KLUP morning show
- 2002: Baron Wiley is promoted to Operations Manager/Program Director
- September 4, 2004: KLUP The Loop flips to News Talk 930 KLUP.
