= KWED =

- Seguin, Texas; United States
- Broadcast area: Guadalupe County, Texas; Eastern San Antonio area
- Frequency: 1580 kHz
- Branding: 1580 KWED

Programming
- Language: English
- Format: Full service Country music
- Affiliations: Fox News Radio; Premiere Networks; Westwood One

Ownership
- Owner: Guadalupe Media, Ltd.

History
- Founded: June 27, 1946
- First air date: September 9, 1948
- Call sign meaning: "Keeps Working Every Day"

Technical information
- Licensing authority: FCC
- Facility ID: 52671
- Class: B
- Power: 1,450 watts day 300 watts night
- Transmitter coordinates: 29°34′48.00″N 97°59′5.00″W

Links
- Public license information: Public file; LMS
- Webcast: Listen Live
- Website: seguintoday.com

KWED (1580 AM) is a radio station in Seguin, Texas broadcasting a full service country music format. It is currently owned by Guadalupe Media, Ltd. Programming is sourced from Premiere Networks and Westwood One, along with news and weather updates every hour from Fox News Radio and an in-house news staff. KWED also operates an online newspaper, Seguin Daily News, produced by the news staff every business day and available for free on the station's website.

KWED uses a non-directional antenna, broadcasting with 1,450 watts during the day, covering all of Guadalupe County and most of the Eastern San Antonio metro area, including the cities of Schertz, New Braunfels, San Marcos, and Luling. But because 1580 AM is a Canadian clear-channel frequency, KWED powers down to 300 watts at night to protect CKDO in Oshawa, Ontario. This means that the station cannot be heard outside of Guadalupe County at night. The signal originates from a transmitter site located on C.H. Matthies Jr. Drive in west Seguin, just to the north of the Texas Lutheran University campus. Studios and offices are located on East Court Street, also in Seguin.

== History ==
=== Early years ===
On June 27, 1946, KWED's initial construction permit was granted to Seguin resident Weldon Lawson. KWED was to initially broadcast with unlimited hours on 1400 kHz, contingent on KONO's move from 1400 kHz to 860 kHz. However, KWED was granted a license for 1580 as a daytime-only station prior to sign-on; this was necessary as 1580 was, and still is, a Canadian clear-channel frequency. KWED began broadcasting on September 9, 1948, and its initial license to cover was granted on October 4, 1948. On January 1, 1950, Garfield Kiel, the station's initial general manager, became a co-partner in the operation. The two re-organized their holdings into the Seguin Broadcasting Company, effective July 18, 1952. By 1957, KWED had relocated to its current studios on East Court Street.

In 1969, Stan McKenzie, who had been associated with the station since 1950, became the station's majority owner, taking over from Kiel's wife Edith. That same year, KWED received an initial construction permit for a new FM station that would broadcast on 105.3 MHz.

=== Aborted 2016 sale to Seguin ISD ===
As you might suspect, people were angry about this. They didn't understand the district trying to use public money this way, and most community members seemed to understand that this wasn't about students. It was about censorship. It was about stifling any critical voices in the community. It was about creating a propaganda arm for Seguin ISD, and its current administration.

— Darren Dunn, KWED general manager and Guadalupe Media managing partner, in an editorial published on the station's website.

On August 18, 2016, the Seguin ISD school board voted 6-1 to enter into negotiations with Guadalupe Media to lease the company's assets including KWED, the Seguin Daily News, and its community web portal seguintoday.com. The school board stated that the purchase of the station would provide learning opportunities to students interested in broadcasting. The district would have paid $6,250 a month over five years to lease the paper and radio station, with the opportunity to purchase them outright after two years. Community backlash against the district was swift, with some residents (including Seguin Mayor Don Keil) feeling that the school board's intent was to silence a media outlet whose reporting had been critical of the district in recent years. On August 24, 2016, Guadalupe Media opted out of negotiations with Seguin ISD, thanking the community for its support.
