= KKYX =

Classic country radio station in San Antonio

- San Antonio, Texas; United States
- Broadcast area: Greater San Antonio; South Texas
- Frequency: 680 kHz
- Branding: Country Legends KKYX 680 AM & 104.9 FM

Programming
- Format: Classic country
- Affiliations: San Antonio Missions

Ownership
- Owner: Cox Media Group; (CMG NY/Texas Radio, LLC)
- Sister stations: KCYY; KISS-FM; KONO; KONO-FM; KSMG; KTKX

History
- First air date: 1926
- Former call signs: KGCM (1926); KTAP (1926–1931); KABC (1931–1954); KGBS (1954); KENS (1954–1962); KBAT (1962–1972)

Technical information
- Licensing authority: FCC
- Facility ID: 48723
- Class: B
- Power: 50,000 watts days 10,000 watts nights
- Transmitter coordinates: 29°30′3.8″N 98°49′55.1″W
- Translator: 104.9 K285EU (Mendoza)
- Repeater: 100.3 KCYY-HD2 (San Antonio)

Links
- Public license information: Public file; LMS
- Webcast: Listen live Listen live (via Audacy)
- Website: www.kkyx.com

KKYX (680 kHz) is a commercial AM radio station licensed to San Antonio, Texas. It broadcasts a classic country format and is owned by the Cox Media Group. It focuses on country hits of the 1950s through the 1990s. It also carries play-by-play of the San Antonio Missions of the Texas League (Minor League Baseball). The studios are on Data Point Drive in Northwest San Antonio near the South Texas Medical Center.

By day, KKYX transmits 50,000 watts non-directional. As 680 AM is a clear channel frequency, to protect other stations from interference, KKYX reduces power at night to 10,000 watts. After sunset, it uses a directional antenna with a four-tower array. The transmitter site is off FM471 in Medina County, about 10 miles west of Downtown San Antonio. Programming is also heard on 250-watt FM translator K285EU at 104.9 MHz in Mendoza.

== History ==
The station signed on the air in the fall of 1926. It had the sequentially assigned call sign KCGM. Initially, it was a 10-watt station and had limited programming. By early December the schedule was reported to be "Daily except Sunday: 10:15 a.m weather forecast; 10:30-11:30 a.m. request music; 12:30 road information followed by music; 6:30-7:30 p.m. request music".

During this time the local Chamber of Commerce was promoting San Antonio as "America's Playground" for conventions and tourists. Aligning the station with this promotion, in December 1926 station owner Robert Bridge arranged for the call sign to be changed to KTAP, standing for the slogan "Kum to America's Playground".

The station's later call signs were KABC, KGBS and KENS, followed in 1962 by KBAT. The KKYX call sign was adopted on September 4, 1972, and the station has had a country music format ever since. It became a major outlet for country artists from much of South Texas. During the 1970s and early 1980s, KKYX was ranked one of the top ten country music radio stations in the United States.

Former KKYX morning personality Jerry King is a member of the Country DJ Hall Of Fame. King retired from KKYX in 2018 after a 53-year radio career. Of those 53 years, he worked for KKYX for 43 years.

== Coverage area ==
KKYX has a fairly large coverage area, covering a large area of southern Texas, including the entire San Antonio and Austin radio markets, along with areas around Victoria, Texas. Grade B coverage can be received in the Corpus Christi and Houston areas. About 100 counties were claimed to be part of the KKYX listening area.

== Translator ==
Broadcast translator for KKYX
Call sign	Frequency	City of license	FID	ERP (W)	HAAT	Class	Transmitter coordinates	FCC info
K285EU	104.9 FM	Mendoza, Texas	87144	250	61 m (200 ft)	D	29°30′52″N 98°34′7″W	LMS
