= KCHL =

Coordinates: 29°24′45″N 98°24′52″W

San Antonio, Texas; United States
- Frequency: 1480 kHz
- Branding: Gospel 1480

Programming
- Language: English
- Format: Urban gospel

Ownership
- Owner: Darrell E. Martin

History
- First air date: 1960
- Former call signs: KAPE (1960–1988); KCHL (1988–1991); KMMZ (1991–1992)

Technical information
- Licensing authority: FCC
- Class: D
- Power: 2,500 watts day 90 watts night
- Translator: 92.1 K221GF (San Antonio)

Links
- Public license information: Public file; LMS
- Website: kchl.org

KCHL (1480 AM) is an urban gospel radio station based in San Antonio, Texas.

== History ==
KCHL's format history includes Urban Contemporary (or Soul) as KAPE from the mid 60's to 1990.

It was at one time owned by Vision Communications which also owned now defunct KMMX "KMIX 106.7" out of Terrell Hills.

In 1988, shortly after the station was acquired by Vision Communications, KAPE changed call letters and had a short lived Urban Oldies format followed by an Urban Contemporary format in the spring of 1991, trying to capture listeners of KSAQ Q96fm which at the time was an Urban leaning CHR station which called it quits and flipped to Active Rock on February 3, 1991, while changing the call letters to KCHL. This lasted until from April to June 1991 which it would briefly flip to Gospel music.

Several months later, New City Communications owners of KCYY and KKYX would LMA both KMMX FM and KMMZ AM during the divestiture of Vision Communications stations in the Terrell Hills/San Antonio market. During this time, KCHL would become KMMZ airing an adult standards format competing with KLUP 930 and replacing the void KTSA 55 left when flipping their standards format to News/Talk.

The standards format on KMMZ AM was short lived as the station was sold off to the current owner who flipped it back to Urban Gospel and revived the KCHL calls.
