= KNAF (AM) =

Radio station in Fredericksburg, Texas

- Fredericksburg, Texas; United States
- Broadcast area: Texas Hill Country
- Frequency: 910 kHz
- Branding: COUNTRY AM 910

Programming
- Format: Country, Polka, Live Sports Houston Astros, Local and Hill Country News

Ownership
- Owner: HC Broadcasting, LLC
- Sister stations: KFAN-FM, KEEP-FM, KNAF-FM

History
- First air date: 1947

Technical information
- Licensing authority: FCC
- Facility ID: 22670
- Class: B
- Power: 630 watts day 165 watts night
- Transmitter coordinates: 30°17′12″N 98°52′58″W

Links
- Public license information: Public file; LMS
- Website: KNAF AM

KNAF (910 kHz) is an AM radio station broadcasting a country music format. Licensed to Fredericksburg, Texas, United States, the station serves the Texas Hill Country area. The station is owned by HC Broadcasting, LLC.
