= Konno =

Konno (written: 金野, 今野 or 紺野) is a Japanese surname. Notable people with the surname include:

- Akira Konno (今野 章; born 1974), Japanese footballer
- Akitsugu Konno (金野 昭次; born 1944), Japanese ski jumper
- Asami Konno (紺野 あさ美; born 1987), Japanese idol and singer
- Azuma Konno (今野 東; born 1947), Japanese politician
- Ayaka Konno (紺野彩夏; born 1999), Japanese actress and model
- Ford Konno (born 1933), American swimmer
- Hideki Konno (紺野 秀樹; born 1965), Japanese video game designer
- Hiromi Konno (今野 宏美; born 1975), Japanese voice actress
- Hitoshi Konno (紺野 仁; born 1934), Japanese basketball player
- Jun Konno (金野 潤; born 1967), Japanese judoka
- Jun Konno (voice actor) (金野 潤; born 1975), Japanese voice actor
- Mahiru Konno (紺野 まひる; born 1977), Japanese actress
- Mari Konno (born 1980), Japanese basketball player
- Misako Konno (紺野 美沙子; born 1960), Japanese actress and essayist
- Shiggy Konno (金野 滋; 1922–2007), Japanese rugby union player
- Yasuko Konno (今野 安子), Japanese table tennis player
- Yasuyuki Konno (今野 泰幸; born 1983), Japanese footballer
- Yuiko Konno (金野 結子; born 1980), Japanese women's footballer

== Fictional characters ==
- Makoto Konno (紺野 真琴, Konno Makoto), the main character of the anime film The Girl Who Leapt Through Time
- Junko Konno (紺野 純子, Konno Junko), one of the main characters of the anime series Zombie Land Saga
- Yuuki Konno (紺野 木綿季, Konno Yuuki), one of the characters of Sword Art Online

== See also ==
- Konno Station, a railway station in Gifu Prefecture, Japan
