= KLUP =

Radio station in Terrell Hills, Texas

- Terrell Hills, Texas; United States
- Broadcast area: San Antonio metropolitan area
- Frequency: 930 kHz
- Branding: 930AM The Answer

Programming
- Language: English
- Format: Conservative talk radio
- Affiliations: Salem Radio Network; Townhall News

Ownership
- Owner: Salem Media Group; (Salem Communications Holding Corporation)
- Sister stations: KSLR

History
- First air date: October 17, 1947
- Former call signs: KITE (1947–78); KCCW (1978–85); KLLS (1985–87); KRIA (1987–90); KISS (1990–92)
- Call sign meaning: Pronounced as "loop", former station branding

Technical information
- Licensing authority: FCC
- Facility ID: 34975
- Class: B
- Power: 5,000 watts day; 1,000 watts night
- Transmitter coordinates: 29°31′9.8″N 98°24′14.1″W

Links
- Public license information: Public file; LMS
- Webcast: Listen live
- Website: 930amtheanswer.com

KLUP (930 AM) – branded 930AM The Answer – is a commercial conservative talk radio station licensed to serve Terrell Hills, Texas. Owned by the Salem Media Group, the station covers the San Antonio metropolitan area. The KLUP studios and transmitter are both located in San Antonio. Besides a standard analog transmission, KLUP is available online.

== History ==
On October 17, 1947, the station first signed on as KITE in San Antonio, owned by Charles A. Balthrope and was a 1,000 watt daytimer, required to go off the air at night. In the 1950s, the power was boosted and the station was authorized to stay on the air around the clock, running the current 5,000 watts by day and 1,000 watts at night.

In May 1960, KITE was acquired by the Townsend U.S. International Growth Fund. An advertisement in the 1960 edition of Broadcasting Yearbook described KITE as "The Adults Favorite Station in San Antonio". Later in the 1960s, KITE's city of license was moved from San Antonio to Terrell Hills. In 1966, it signed on an FM station, KITE-FM 104.5 (now KZEP). Both stations were owned by Doubleday Broadcasting Co., a subsidiary of publisher Doubleday and Company. Doubleday put progressive rock on the FM station, changing the call sign to KEXL, while KITE remained with its middle of the road music format.

In 1978, KITE was acquired by Lone Star Broadcasting, becoming KCCW. It later came under the ownership of Radio Alamo and again changed its call letters, this time to KLLS. It was paired up with FM 100.3, which became KLLS-FM. The two stations simulcast as "Class 100 FM".

Shortly afterward, KLLS-FM was acquired by KKYX, and 930 tried a talk format as KRNN and, later, a bilingual music format with mostly Spanish announcing as KRIA "Radio Alegria". Neither incarnation was successful.

Adams Radio acquired the station after entering the market when it bought KISS-FM 99.5. In 1990, it changed call letters from KRIA to KISS and took an oldies format known as "Kool Gold 930 AM". "Kool Gold" was a satellite delivered oldies format originating out of Phoenix on Adams sister KOOL, but it later was simulcast with KISS-FM, after it fired its entire airstaff to air the Satellite Music Network's Pure Gold oldies programming. In 1992, the Rusk Corporation paid $3.95 million for KISS-AM-FM. KISS-FM returned to its original rock format, while the format on KISS switched to syndicated adult standards as KLUP "The Loop".

In 1997, Cox Radio acquired KLUP, keeping the standards format. Three years later, Cox spun off KLUP to Salem Media Group, who switched KLUP to a talk radio format a short time later.

== Programming ==
KLUP's schedule features programming from the Salem Radio Network, including Hugh Hewitt, Mike Gallagher, Dennis Prager, Charlie Kirk, Sebastian Gorka and Brandon Tatum. Other National hosts include Del Walmsley, Jay Sekulow, and Todd Starnes.
