= KFAN-FM =

Adult album alternative radio station in Johnson City, Texas

- Johnson City, Texas; United States
- Broadcast area: Texas Hill Country
- Frequency: 107.9 MHz
- Branding: KFAN 107.9

Programming
- Format: Americana, Adult album alternative

Ownership
- Owner: J. & J. Fritz Media, Ltd.
- Sister stations: KEEP, KNAF, KNAF-FM

History
- First air date: May 21, 1990 (as KBKK)
- Former call signs: KBKK (1990–1991); KFAN (1991)
- Call sign meaning: "Fan"

Technical information
- Licensing authority: FCC
- Facility ID: 22671
- Class: C3
- ERP: 14,500 watts
- HAAT: 132 meters (433 ft)
- Transmitter coordinates: 30°23′35″N 98°35′53″W

Links
- Public license information: Public file; LMS
- Website: www.texasrebelradio.com

KFAN-FM (107.9 FM) is a radio station broadcasting an Americana/adult album alternative format. Licensed to Johnson City, Texas, United States, the station is owned by J. & J. Fritz Media, Ltd.

== History ==
The station went on the air as KBKK on May 21, 1990. On February 8, 1991, the station changed its call sign to KFAN, and on July 16, 1991, to the current KFAN-FM.

The station is often referred to simply as "The Fan."

Some of the past KFAN DJs/Hosts include:

- JD Rose (Original)
- Annie Walls (Original)
- Steve Coffman (deceased)
- Ron Houston (deceased)
- Rod Herbert
