= South Texas Medical Center =

- District of San Antonio
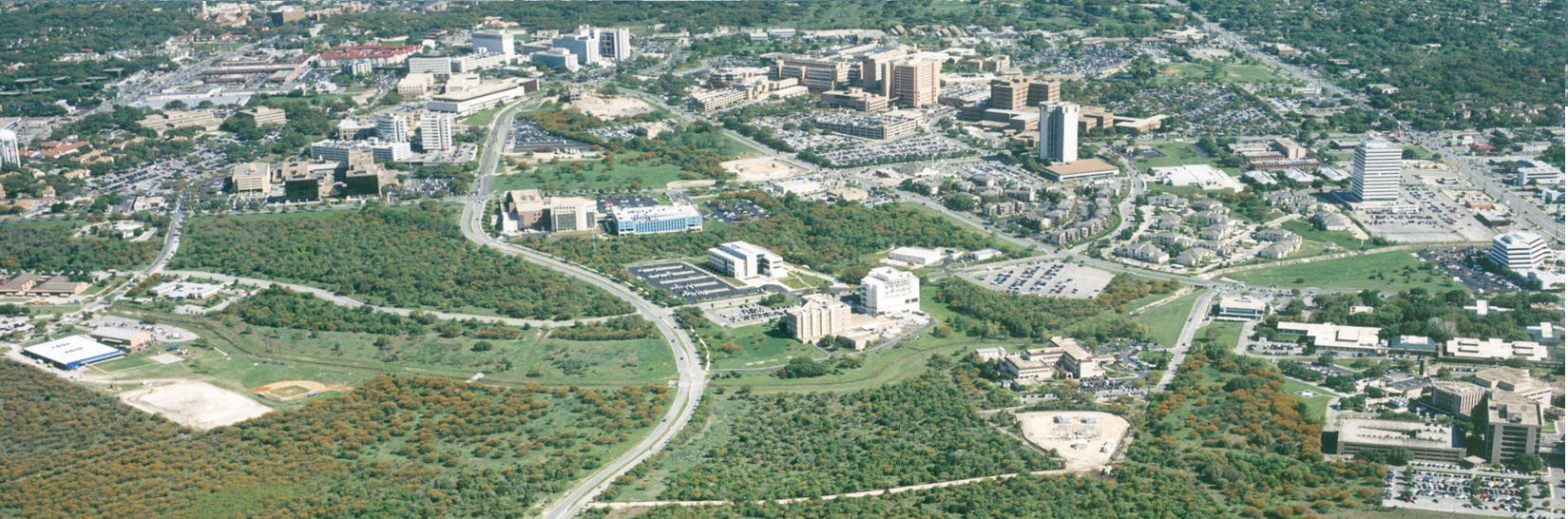
- Aerial of the South Texas Medical Center in northwest San Antonio
- Interactive map of South Texas Medical Center

The South Texas Medical Center (STMC) consists of 900 acres (360 ha) of medical-related facilities on the northwest side of San Antonio, Texas, United States.

STMC, which directly serves 38 counties, consists of forty-five medically related institutions; separate medical, dental and nursing schools, five higher educational institutions, twelve hospitals and five specialty institutions. These facilities combined currently total over 4,200 patient beds.

In 2009, STMC was home to more than $350 million in construction projects. More than $1 billion in new construction projects are currently planned through 2014.

== Staff and budget ==
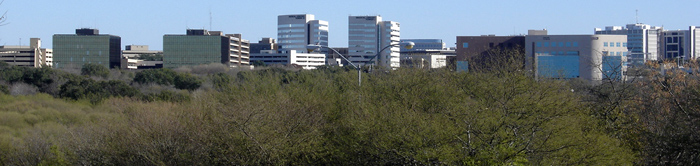
STMC is located about 10 miles northwest of Downtown San Antonio.

In 2009, 27,884 persons were directly employed at the center, and the combined budget of all entities at the South Texas Medical Center totaled $3.3 billion. STMC is the San Antonio area's second largest employer.

== Research and development ==
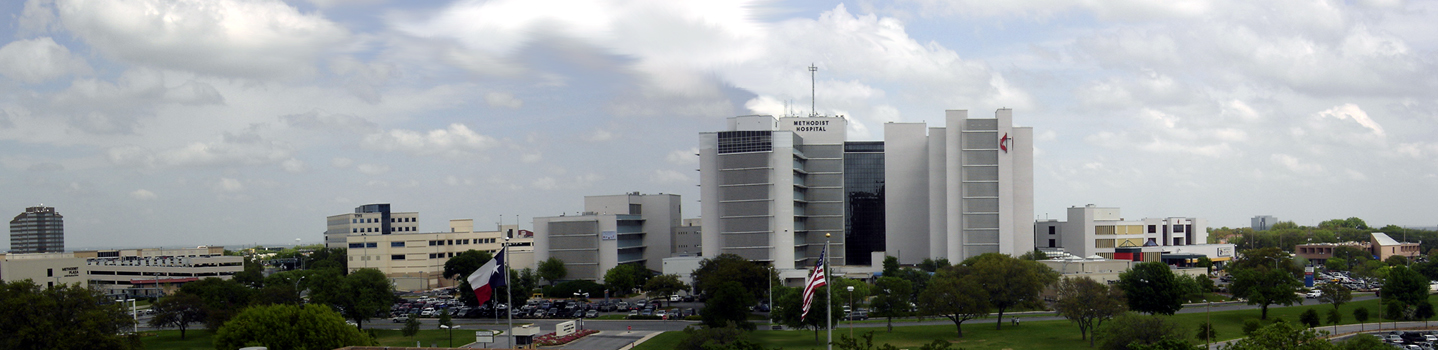
Panoramic view looking east of STMC, as seen from the UTHSCSA medical school. Seen from R to L are Methodist Children's Hospital, Methodist Heart Hospital, Methodist Gamma Knife Center, Texas Neuroscience Institute, and Methodist Plaza.

San Antonio's Biosciences industry employs over 100,000 people. The largest areas of research are conducted by institutes in or around the South Texas Medical Center. These include the oncology division of one of the world's top five biotechnology firms, the world's largest Phase I clinical trials program for new anti-cancer drugs, and the new $200 million Children's Cancer Research Institute. San Antonio also houses the world's largest genomics computing cluster and the state's public bank for stem cell-rich umbilical cord blood.

== Academics ==
Central to the medical center is the University of Texas Health Science Center at San Antonio and its teaching hospital: The University Hospital, which is the source of employment for 12,000 people. The Audie Murphy VA Hospital, CTRC, Brooke Army Medical Center, Texas Cancer Clinic, the Children's Cancer Research Institute, Christus Santa Rosa health system, Texas Neuroscience Institute, Villa Rosa, St Luke, and 11 Methodist hospitals also have affiliated programs or projects with the UT Health Science Center.

The University of the Incarnate Word also has a campus located in the eastern part of the South Texas Medical Center, where its optometry school is located. UIW has affiliated programs with the Christus Santa Rosa health system.

San Antonio College has a nursing training program at STMC, and the University of Texas at San Antonio has joint programs with UTHSCSA's GSBS and School of Allied Health Sciences.

The Baptist Health System School of Health Professions is also located in the South Texas Medical Center.

The University of Texas at Austin's School of Pharmacy also has research facilities and staff located in the medical center.

Also situated in the South Texas Medical Center is Health Careers High School, a health professions-based magnet school of Northside ISD that enrolls just under 1,000 students from around Bexar County.

== Gallery ==
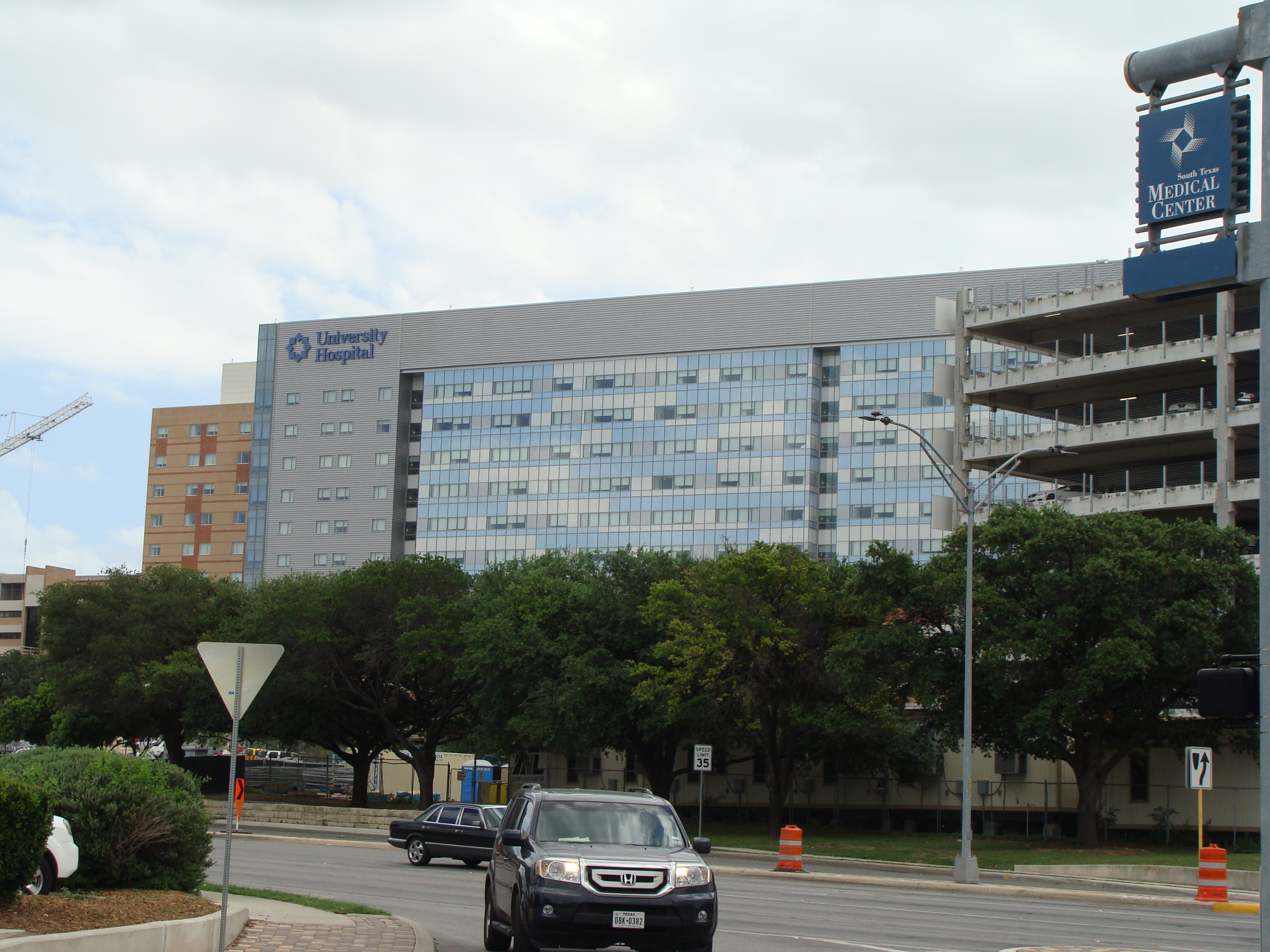
Central to STMC is The University of Texas Health Science Center and its teaching hospital, University Hospital.

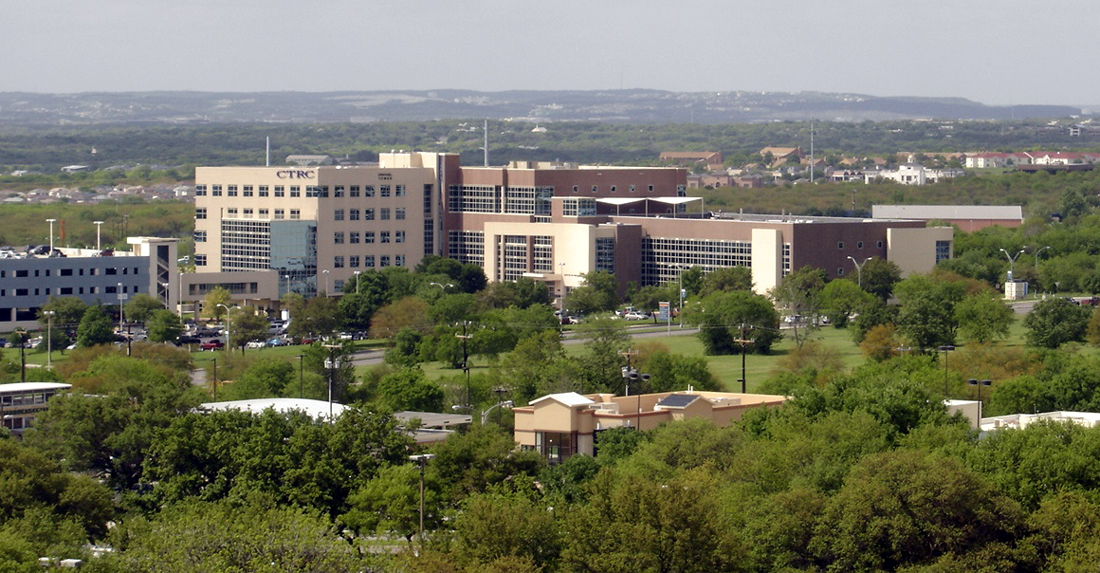
The Cancer Therapy & Research Center

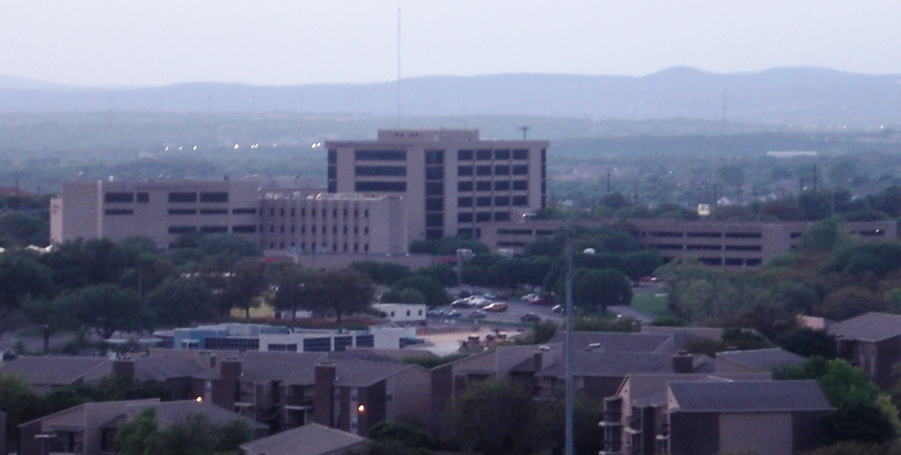
The Christus Santa Rosa medical hospitals, located in the northwestern quadrant of STMC

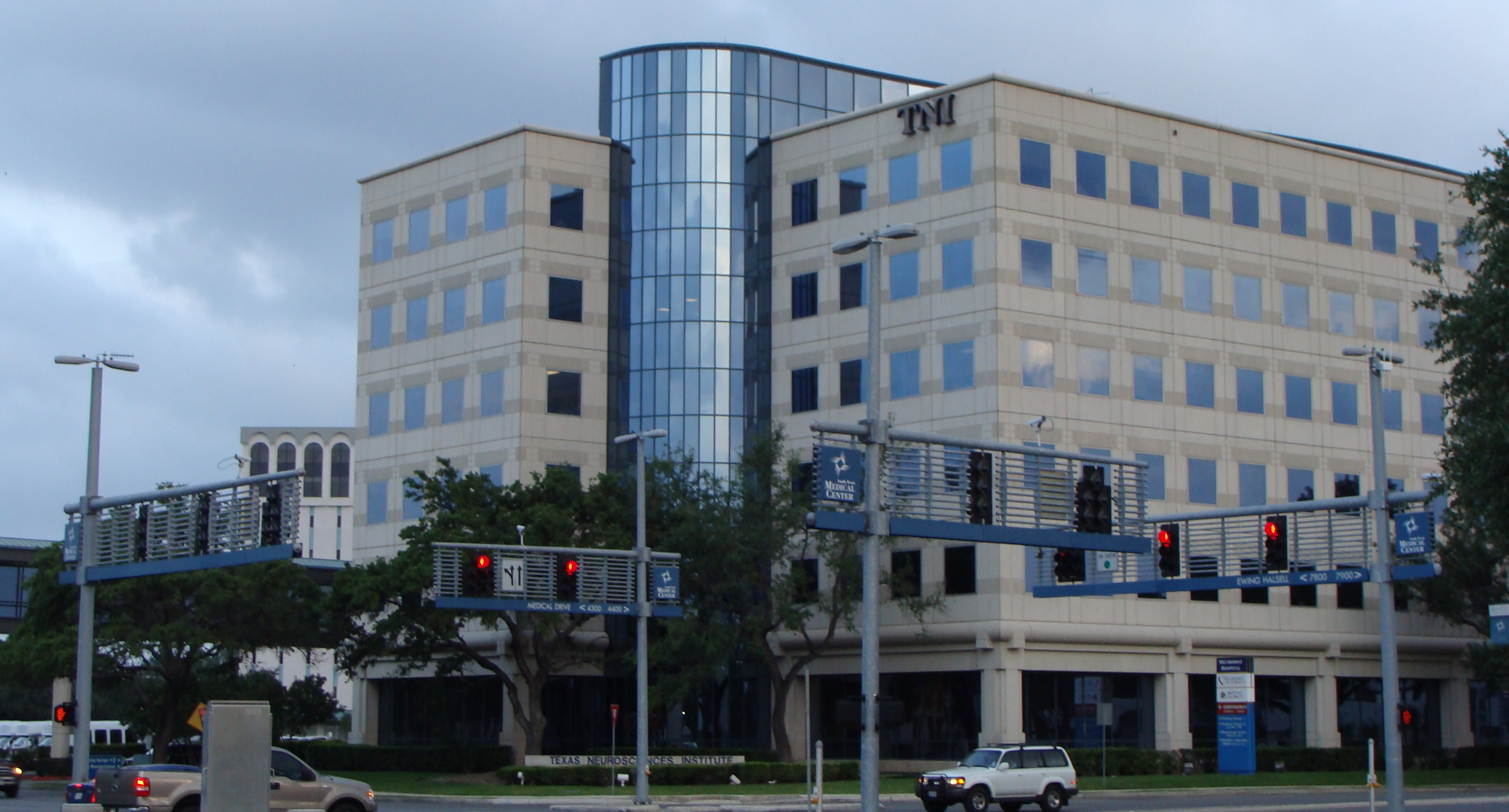
The Texas Neuroscience Institute

== Member institutions ==
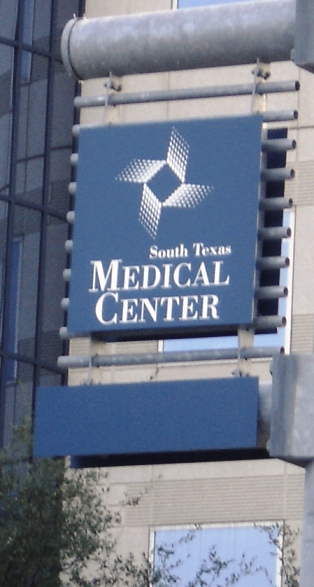

Member institutions with facilities and offices in the Center are:

- American Cancer Society
- American Heart Association
- American Surgery Center of So. TX, Ltd.
- Cancer Therapy & Research Center
- Children's Habilitation Center
- Children's Cancer Research Institute
- Christus Santa Rosa Hospital-Medical Center
- Christus Santa Rosa Medical Center Plaza
- Christus Santa Rosa Medical Center Tower I
- Christus Santa Rosa Medical Center Tower II
- Diabetes & Glandular Disease Clinic
- Easter Seals Rehabilitation Center
- Ecumenical Center for Religion/Health
- The Fredericksburg Assisted Living Centers
- Fresenius Medical Care
- Gastroenterology Consultants of San Antonio
- La Hacienda de Salud, Ltd.
- HEALTHSOUTH/RIOSA
- Humana Medical Center Plaza
- Kingsley Place at The Medical Center
- LifeCare Hospitals - San Antonio New Plant
- Ronald McDonald House Charities of S.A.
- MedCenter Imaging
- MedCentre Plaza
- Medical Center Surgery Clinic
- Medical Center Tower I
- Medical Center Tower II
- Merrill Gardens at San Antonio
- Methodist Ambulatory Surgery Hospital
- The Methodist Center on Medical Drive
- Methodist Children's Hospital of South Texas
- Methodist Healthcare Ministries
- Methodist Healthcare System Offices
- Methodist Heart Hospital
- Methodist Hospital
- Methodist Plaza
- Methodist Specialty & Transplant Hospital
- Mockingbird Plaza Tower
- New Directions Therapy
- Northside Health Careers High School
- NISD Holmgreen Jr./Sr. High School
- NISD Pupil Appraisal Center
- Northwest Imaging Center
- Oak Hills Medical Building
- Oakdell Office Center
- Pain Products International
- Pasteur Plaza
- Physicians Plaza I
- Physicians Plaza II
- Plaza Lecea
- Pyramid Plaza
- Nellie M. Reddix Center
- Renal Associates
- St. Luke's Baptist Hospital
- San Antonio Surgery Center
- San Antonio Warm Springs Rehab. Hospital
- South Texas Ambulatory Surgery Center
- South Texas Cardiovascular Center
- South Texas Eye Institute
- South Texas Medical Plaza
- South Texas Spinal Clinic, P.A.
- South Texas Veterans HCS
- Southern Texas Spinal Clinic, Physical & Occupational Therapy
- Southwest Mental Health Center
- Texas Cancer Clinic
- Texas Neuroscience Institute
- Texas Pain Institute
- Texas Specialty Nursing & Medical Center
- Tri-Sun Healthcare-Babcock
- Tri-Sun Healthcare-Wurzbach
- Unicorn Centers, Inc.
- University Health System
- University of Texas Health Science Center
- UT Medicine
- West Gate Medical Center
- The Winston School of San Antonio
- Woodbridge Estates Assisted Living

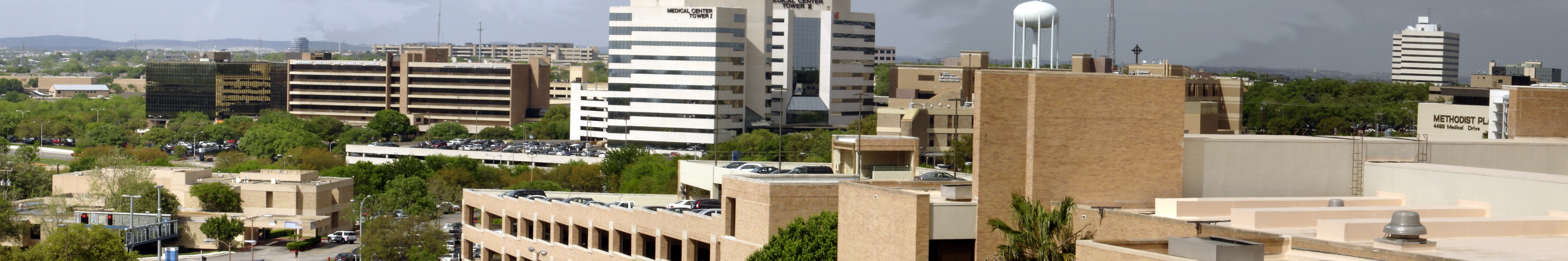
Another view of STMC

== See also ==
- Southwest Research Institute
- Southwestern Medical District
- Southwest Foundation for Biomedical Research
- Texas Medical Center
- University of Texas Southwestern Medical Center

== External sources ==
- South Texas Medical Center
- San Antonio Medical Foundation's listing and extended listing
