= List of biogerontologists =

Notable scientists of biogerontology include the following.

== From Australia ==
- David Sinclair

== From India ==
- Suresh Rattan

== From Romania ==
- Ana Aslan, Romanian biologist and physician who discovered the anti-aging effects of procaine

== From the United Kingdom ==
- Aubrey de Grey
- João Pedro de Magalhães
- Robin Holliday
- Tom Kirkwood

== From the United States ==
- Steven N. Austad
- Nir Barzilai
- Rochelle Buffenstein
- Judith Campisi
- Preston Estep
- Leonard P. Guarente
- Denham Harman
- Leonard Hayflick
- Matt Kaeberlein
- Cynthia Kenyon
- Valter Longo
- S. Jay Olshansky
- David Sinclair
- Jan Vijg
