= Alta Architects =

- Formerly: Muñoz & Company; Kell Muñoz Architects; Kell Muñoz Wigodsky; Jones & Kell; Chumney, Jones & Kell; Bartlett Cocke & Associates; Bartlett Cocke, Architects; Eickenroht & Cocke
- Company type: Private
- Industry: Architecture
- Founded: 1927
- Founder: John Kell Sr. Bartlett Cocke
- Headquarters: San Antonio, Texas, United States
- Key people: Henry R. Munoz III, CEO
- Services: Architecture, Interiors, Graphics, Planning, Infrastructure
- Website: Alta Architects

Alta Architects is an American architecture firm based in San Antonio, Texas. Founded in 1927 as Eickenroht & Cocke, the firm specializes in the design of major academic, K-12, healthcare, scientific and infrastructure projects. It is the largest minority-owned design and management firm in the state of Texas.

The founders were John Kell Sr. (1903–2002) and Bartlett Cocke. Kell's mentor was O'Neil Ford.

Alta Architects has won over 158 juried design awards at the local, state and national levels for a variety of projects.

== Projects ==
This list includes projects in which Alta Architects collaborated with other architecture firms:

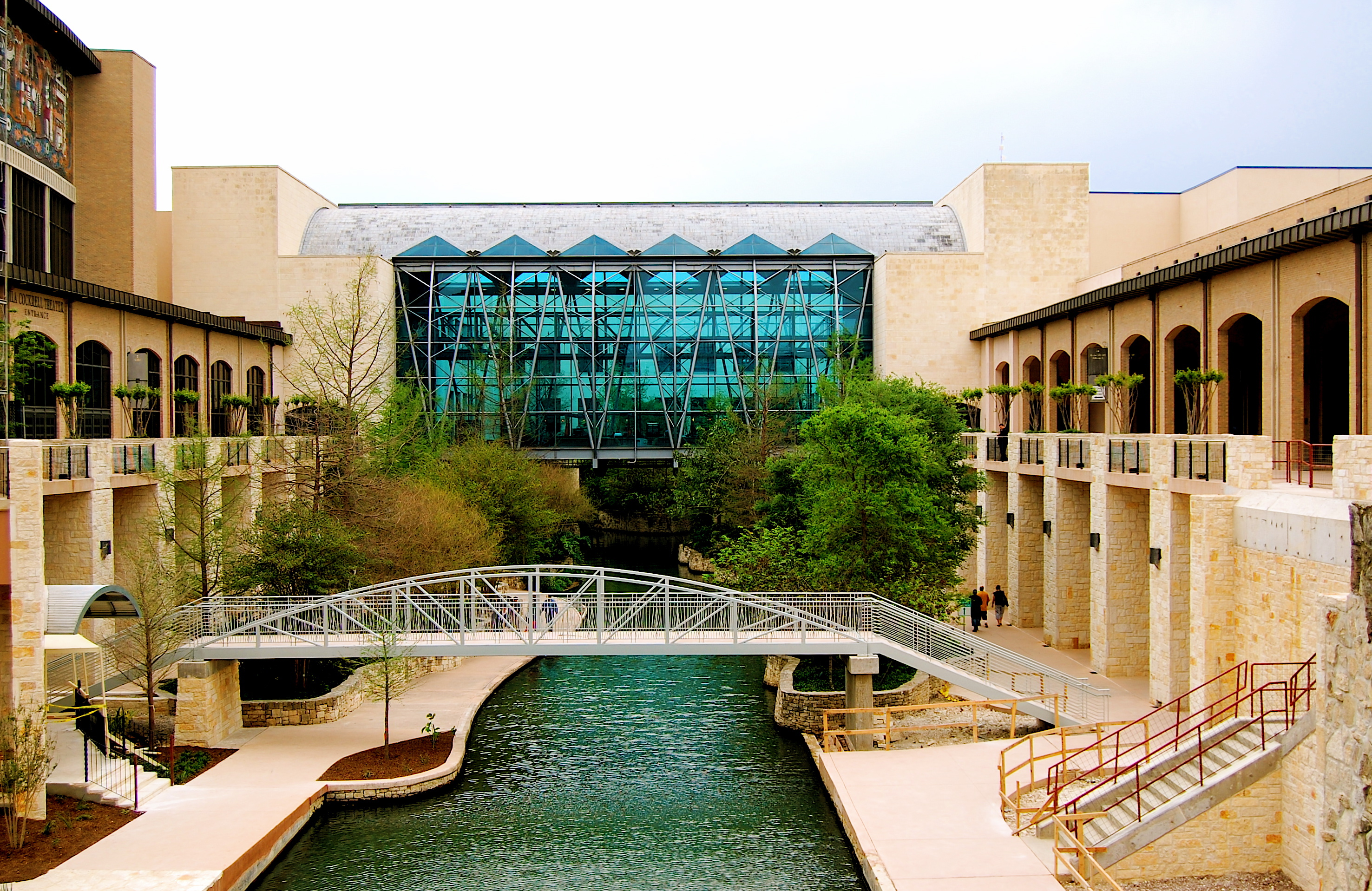
The Henry B. Gonzalez Convention Center

- Henry B. Gonzalez Convention Center, San Antonio, Texas
- Dolph Briscoe Jr. Library, UTHSCSA, Texas
- Northrup Hall, Trinity University, Texas (along with Robert Stern)
- Engineering and Biotechnology Building, UTSA
- University Health System Hospital
- Alice McDermott Building, CTRC, San Antonio, Texas
- Perry–Castañeda Library, UT Austin
- Our Lady of the Lake University main building, Texas
- Frost Bank main tower, Downtown San Antonio, Texas
- University of Texas at Dallas, Math, Science and Engineering Teaching-Learning Center, Dallas, Texas
- AT&T Center (along with Ellerbe Becket)
- University of Texas–Pan American Education Complex
