= Longevity quotient =

Simplified measure of species' longevity

Longevity Quotient (LQ) is a simplified measure to enable normalized comparisons of various species' longevity. It shares some similarity with measures such as Intelligence Quotient. It originated with Steven N. Austad and Kathleen E Fischer's 1991 paper on mammalian aging.

The detailed description of LQ was originally defined as the ratio of Actual Lifespan divided by Predicted Lifespan obtained from the Nonflying Eutherans (NFE) regression relating observed lifespan and body mass relationship. This followed the work of John Prothero and Klaus Jurgens who strictly looked to related longevity and body mass. Austad spells out that "Excluding bats and marsupials mean LQ is 1.0 by definition"

Aging and longevity researchers utilize LQ with additional metrics such as maximum species life span (MLSP). Rochelle Buffenstein considers MLSP as an important species aging characteristic that can vary over a factor of 40,000 throughout the animal kingdom, and is related species increase in body size. Buffenstein identifies the Longevity Quotient as the ratio of actual MLSP to that predicted by body mass.

Recent LQ based research identified some bats are relatively much long-lived. Myotis brandtii is estimated to have an LQ of 8.

Common measures in Aging and Longevity research include Life-Span Variables Mass, Maximum longevity, Predicted MLSP, Longevity quotient (Fisher Austad Formalism, Longevity quotient (Prothero Jugrens Formalism) and lifetime energy expenditure (LEE) (normalized using kilocaories/gram).

== Theories of Longevity and LQ ==
Buffenstein describes the evolutionary theory of aging as a nonadaptive result of the declining power of natural selection allowing harmful genetic mutations may prevail suggesting that species living underground would have long life spans. Using LQ measures it appears that only the social subterranean species have high LQs. Additional discussions of longevity and MLSP abound

== Comparative LQ ==
Comparative Longevity Quotient (using Austad Fischer Scale)
Species	Longevity Quotient	Maximum Lifespan (years)
Human	5.1	122
Mice	0.7	4
Rats	0.6	5
Myotis brandtii	8.0	41
Naked Mole Rats	5.0	28.3

== See also ==
- Longevity
- Siberian bat
- Maximum life span
- Rate-of-living theory
