= University of Texas Health Science Center Department of Radiology =

Coordinates: 29.507494°N 98.575385°W

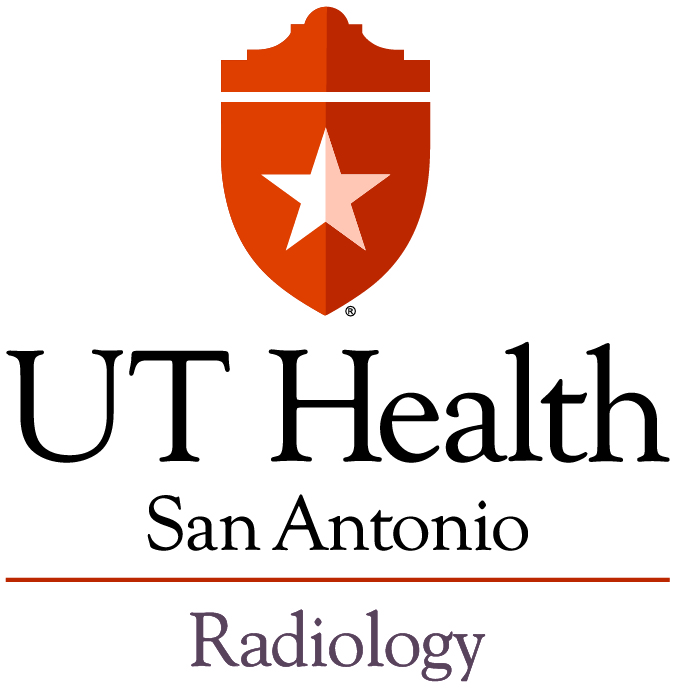

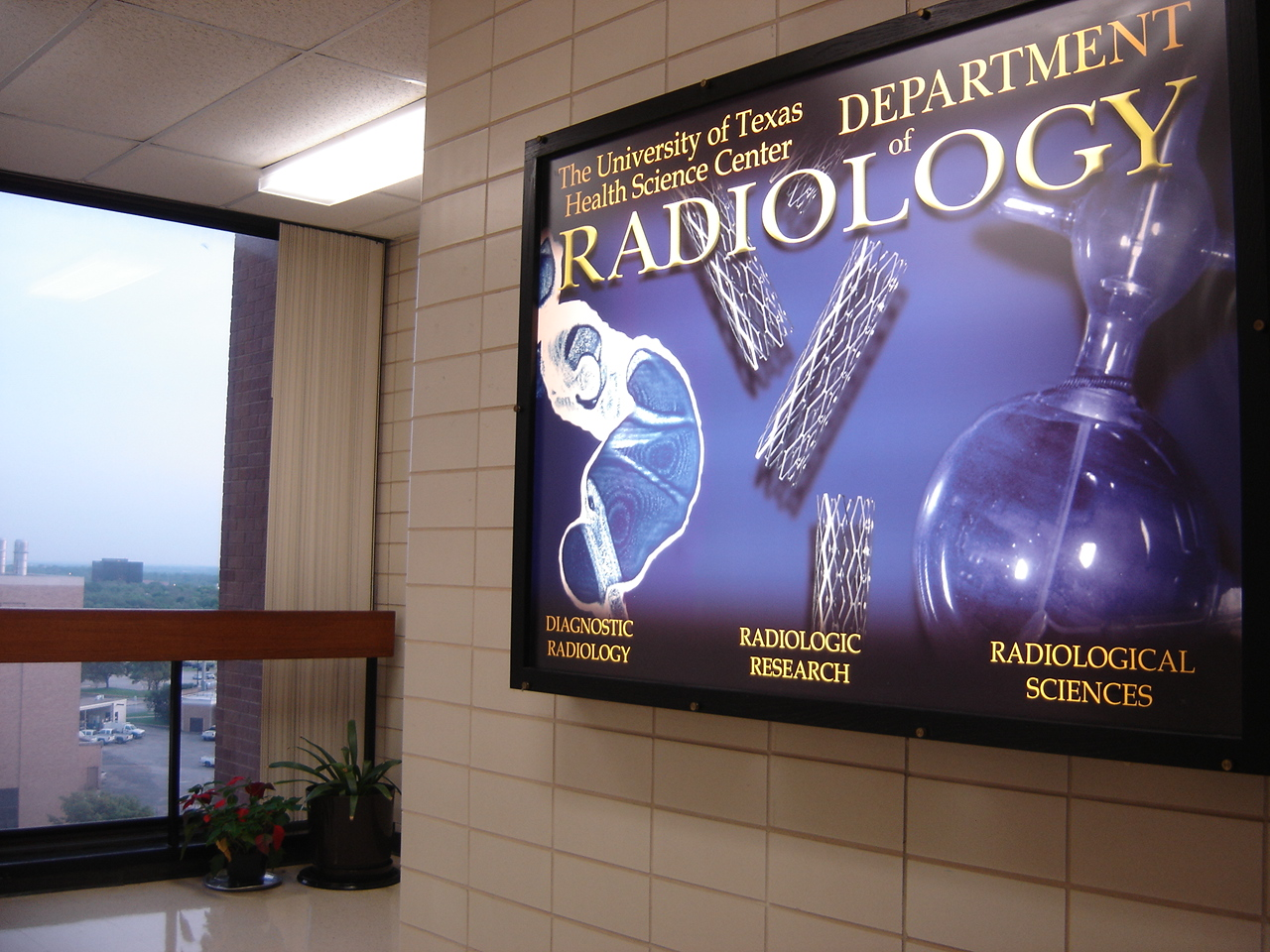

The University of Texas Health Science Center at San Antonio Department of Radiology is the second largest academic department in Radiological Sciences in the United States. Its Graduate Program in Radiological Sciences offers graduate training in various tracks, including Medical Physics, radiation biology, Medical Health Physics, and Neuroimaging. In addition the educational enterprise includes an accredited radiology residency program and a number of fellowships.

The department was historically the first program in the United States to establish a Ph.D. program for radiology residents, which is known as the "Human Imaging" graduate program. While the Radiology Department is part of the School of Medicine, the graduate program is housed administratively within the UTHSCSA Graduate School of Biomedical Sciences (GSBS).

With a minimum of 55 graduate students and over 60 fixed and adjunct faculty members, the program is currently one of the largest graduate programs in medical physics in the United States, and is one of only 17 programs in North America accredited by the Commission on the Accreditation of Medical Physics Education Programs (CAMPEP).

Graduate students research training is conducted in three primary locations within the UTHSCSA complex:

- The Research Imaging Institute
- Cancer Therapy & Research Center
- Research Division of the Radiology Department, located on the main campus, in the GSBS facilities.

The department also has clinical training facilities at Brooke Army Medical Center, South Texas Medical Center including the University Hospital System and the Audie Murphy Memorial Veterans Hospital, Texas Cancer Clinic, Medical and Radiation Physics, Inc. (MARP) and International Medical Physics Services.

RFA, UFE, Cancer therapy, Dialysis work, PAD, AVMs

== Notable achievements ==
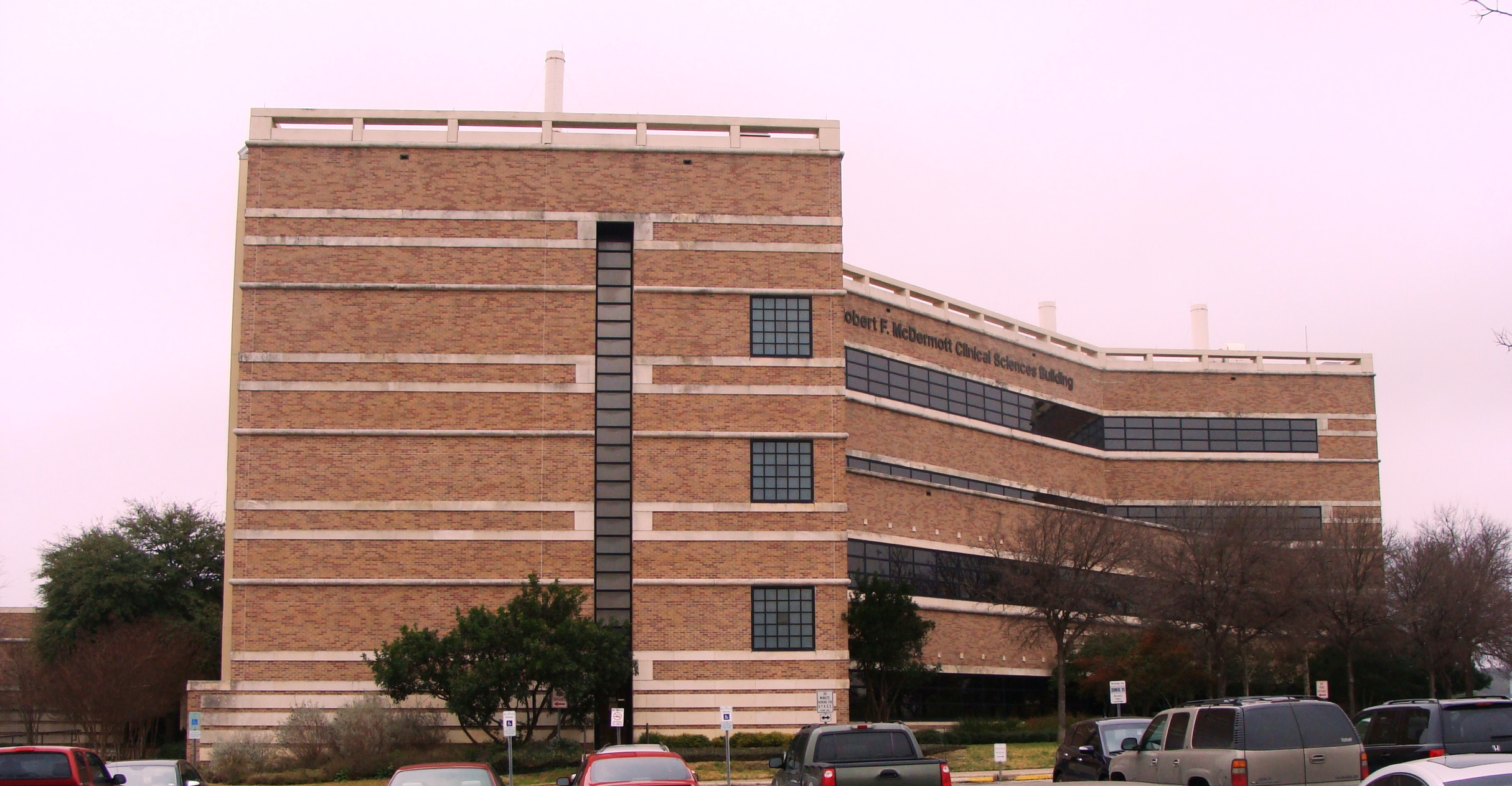
The Research Imaging Institute

- The Palmaz Stent, has been described as "one of the most important inventions in modern medicine", was invented here.
- The first dental digital panoramic X-Ray systems were designed by McDavid et al. here in the late 1980s.
- MANGO, a software especially designed for neuroimaging, was developed here.
- Human Brain Mapping, a journal edited by the faculty of this department, was rated #1 in impact in 2008.

== See also ==
- South Texas Medical Center
- UTHSCSA
