= University of Texas Education and Research Center at Laredo =

Public university location in Texas, USA

The University of Texas Education and Research Center at Laredo
- Other name: UT Center at Laredo
- Former names: Mid Rio Grande Border Area Health Education Center (1993—1999); University of Texas Health Science Center at San Antonio Laredo Regional Campus (1999—2021)
- Motto: Disciplina praesidium civitatis (Latin)
- Motto in English: Cultivated mind is the guardian genius of democracy.
- Type: Public academic health science center
- Established: September 1, 2021; 5 years ago (as UT Center at Laredo)
- Parent institution: University of Texas System
- Executive Director: Adriana B. Nunemaker
- Total staff: 9 (Not including staff of contributing institutions)
- Location: Laredo, Texas, United States; 27.53523°N 99.47491°W
- Campus: 16.5945 acres (6.7156 ha); Urban
- Website: www.utsystem.edu/offices/ut-center-laredo

The University of Texas Education and Research Center at Laredo (UT Center at Laredo) is a public, multi-institution academic health science center in Laredo, Texas, United States. While the UT Center at Laredo does not yet confer its own degrees, it offers degrees and graduate certificates through five affiliate University of Texas (UT) System institutions: UT Health Science Center at San Antonio (UT Health SA/UTHSCSA), UT San Antonio (UTSA), UT Health Science Center at Houston (UT Health Houston), UT Rio Grande Valley (UTRGV), and UT Medical Branch (UTMB).

The center also collaborates with Texas A&M International University (TAMIU), a member of the Texas A&M University System. Through this partnership, the center offers an Undergraduate Accelerated Master’s Degree, a five year program in which students pursue a Bachelor of Arts/Science and, concurrently, a Master of Science or graduate certificate in Biomedical Informatics.

== History ==
=== MRGB-AHEC (1993—1999) ===
In 1993, the MRGB-AHEC (Mid Rio Grande Border Area Health Education Center) was created and located on the current campus before the construction of the center's two main buildings, the D.D. Hachar and Academic Buildings.

=== UTHSCSA Laredo Regional Campus (1999—2021) ===
On June 19, 1999, Texas Senate Bill 1288, authored by Judith Zaffirini and sponsored by Henry Cuellar, was passed during the 76th Texas Legislature which established the University of Texas Health Science Center at San Antonio Laredo Regional Campus(UT Health San Antonio Laredo Regional Campus) from the existing MRGB-AHEC. The MRGB-AHEC remains in operation in another location in Laredo.

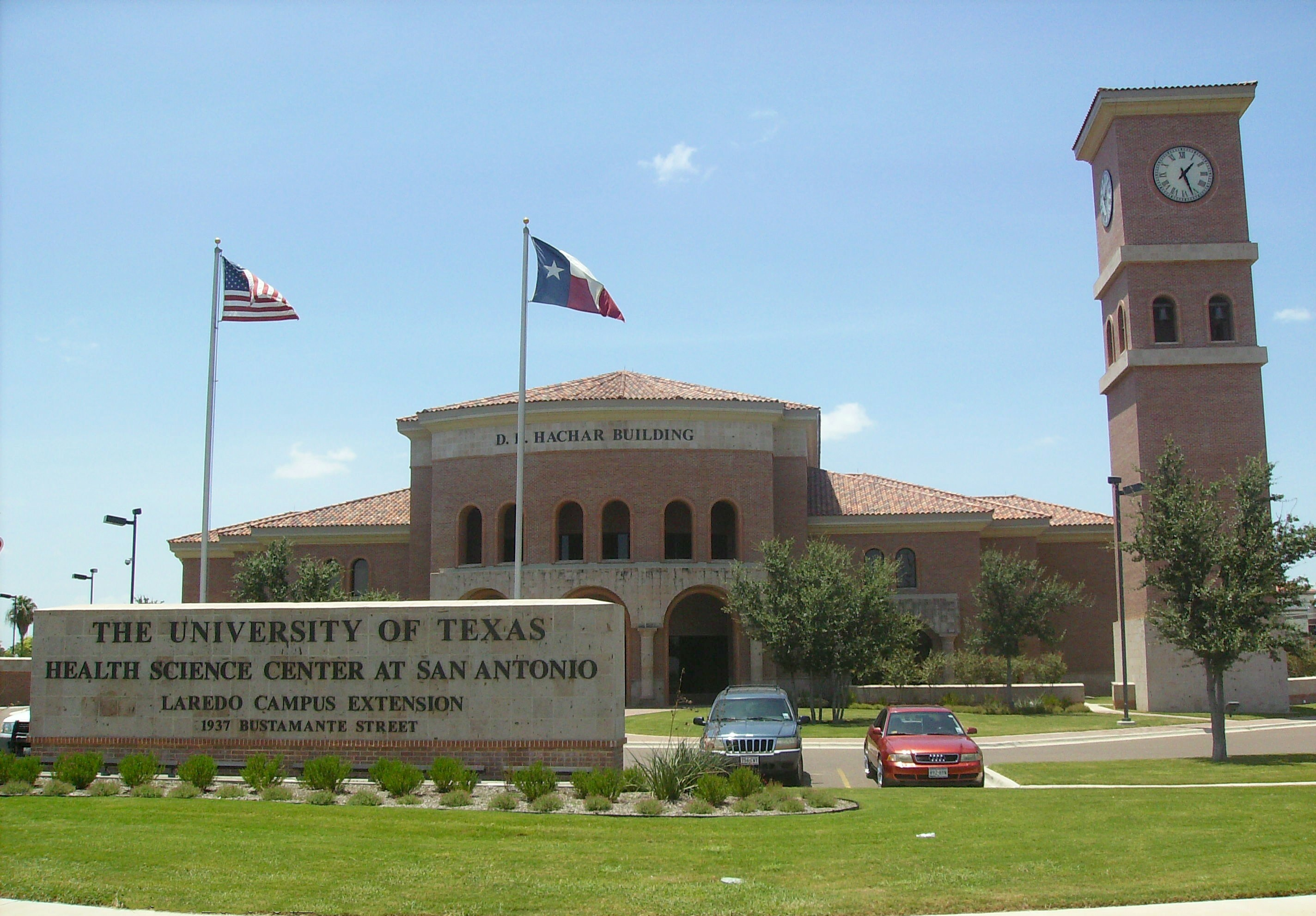
Sign bearing "The University of Texas Health Science Center at San Antonio Laredo Campus Extension"

Former logo of the Laredo Regional Campus.

=== UT Center at Laredo (2021—Present) ===
On May 28, 2021, Texas Senate Bill 884, authored by Judith Zaffirini and sponsored by Richard Raymond, was passed during the 87th Texas Legislature which led to the establishment of the UT Center at Laredo. The bill did not take effect until September 1, 2026; and on November 30, 2021, a ceremony was held on campus to commemorate the center's creation. Also in 2021, along with the center's creation, came several programs from new affiliate universities, UTSA and UT Health Houston.

- 2022: The center entered an MOU with UTRGV which also brought several programs offered by the university to the center.
- 2023: UT Health SA began offering it's Bachelor of Science in Entry Level Dental Hygiene which led to the creation of three new, unnamed buildings on the center's campus.
- 2024: It was announced that UTMB would begin offering it's hybrid Doctor of Occupational Therapy program at the center starting in 2025.
- 2025: UT System Board of Regents approved the allocation of funds for the design and construction of the Laredo Multipurpose Building, along with the creation of a campus master plan.
- 2026: Ground breaking ceremony for the Laredo Multipurpose Building held on October 15, 2026

== Programs ==
The UT Center at Laredo offers health degrees and certifications from five UT System institutions:

=== UT Health SA ===
- Bachelor of Science in Entry Level Dental Hygiene
- Master of Physician Assistant Studies
- Graduate Certificate in Pediatric Dentistry

=== UTSA ===
- Bachelor of Arts in Spanish and Community Health Multidisciplinary Studies

=== UT Health Houston ===
- Graduate Certificate in Biomedical Informatics
- Master of Science in Biomedical Informatics

=== UT Health Houston & TAMIU ===
- Undergraduate Accelerated Masters (4+1) Program
  - Bachelor of Arts/Science
  - Masters of Science or graduate certificate in Biomedical Informatics

=== UTRGV ===
- Bachelor of Arts in Social Work
- Masters of Science in Social Work
- Bachelor of Science in Medical Laboratory Science
- Master of Education in Counseling

=== UTMB ===
- Entry-Level Doctorate in Occupational Therapy

== Campus Buildings ==
=== D.D. Hachar Building ===
A two-story building, designed by Guillermo "Willy" Cavazos of Cavazos Architects, opened in 2002. The architectural style of the building is meant to be evocative of Spanish Colonial Architecture with its use of Cantera Stone and "over-sized Mexican brick." An accompanying unnamed clock tower was also constructed with the building and follows the same architectural style.

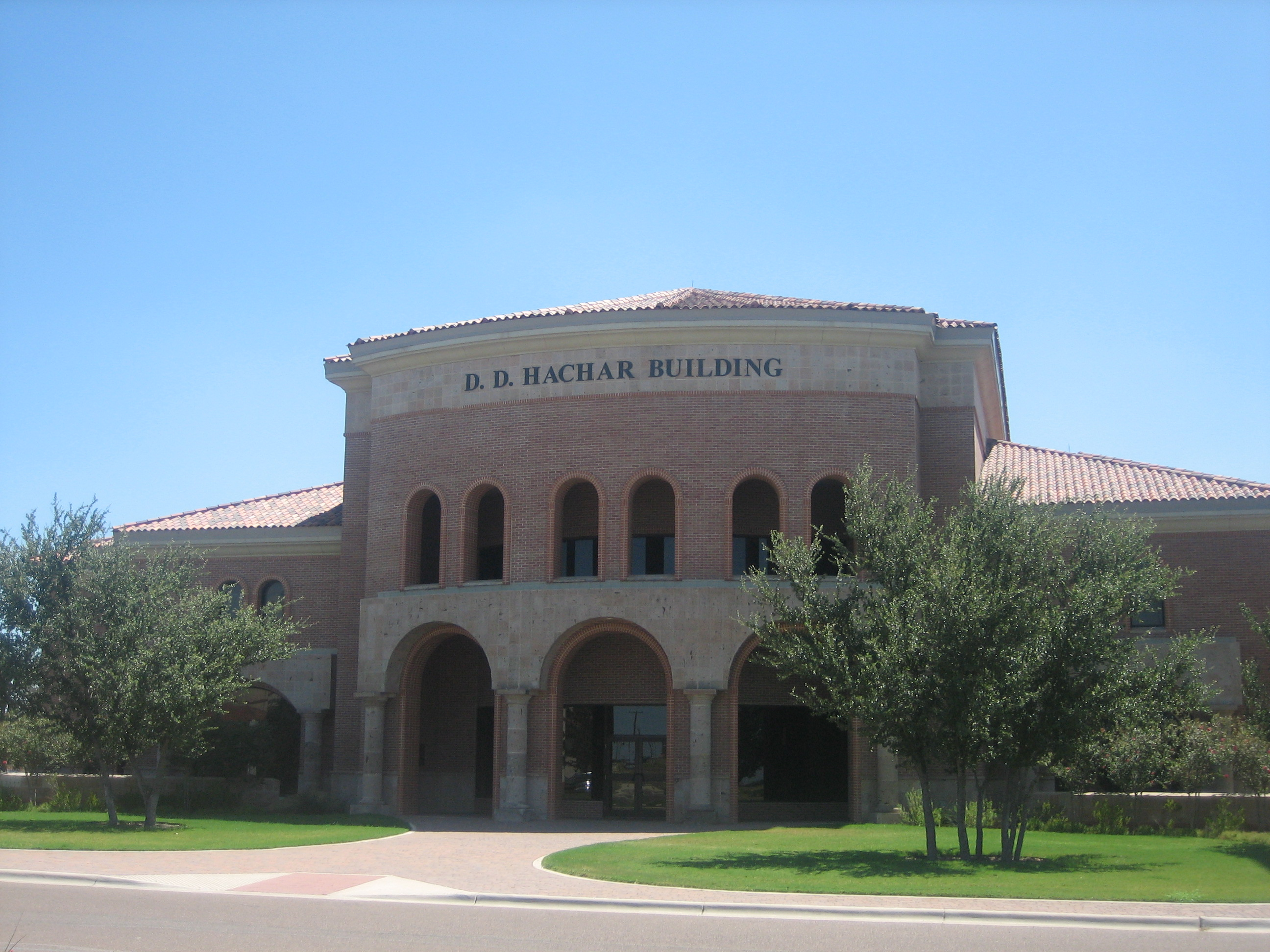
D.D. Hachar Building at the UT Center at Laredo.

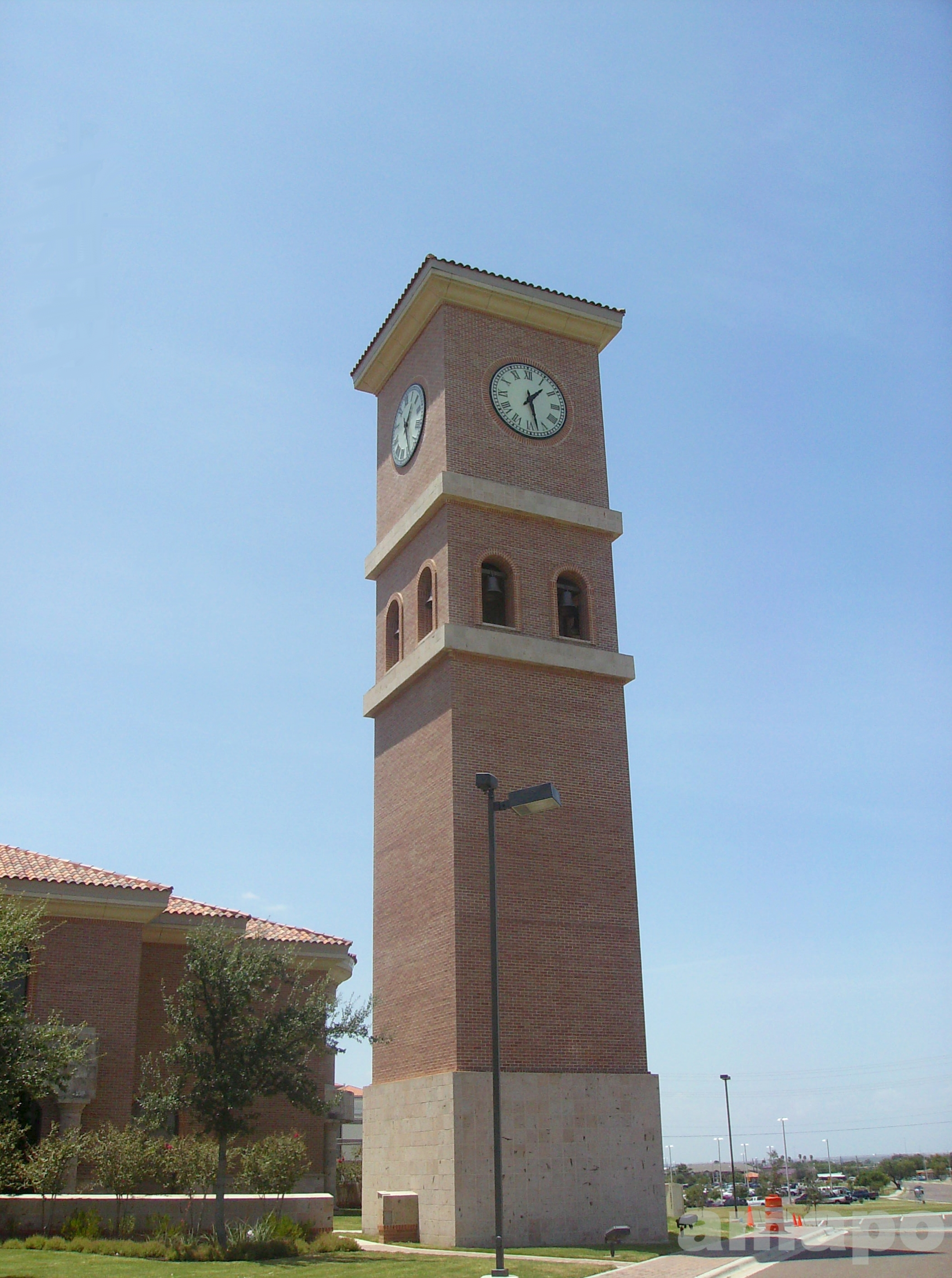
Clock Tower at the UT Center at Laredo.

=== Laredo Academic Building ===
A two-story building, designed by Alta Architects and constructed by Bartlett Cocke General Contractors, opened in 2007. The building's L-shape allows it to wrap around the D.D. Hachar Building creating a courtyard with paths connecting the two buildings. The building also followed a similar architectural style as the D.D. Hachar Building and accompanying clock tower.

==== Library ====
The library of UT Center at Laredo, found on the first floor of the Laredo Academic Building, contains physical books that pertain to the subject areas instructed and digital access to other UT System digital libraries for enrolled students.

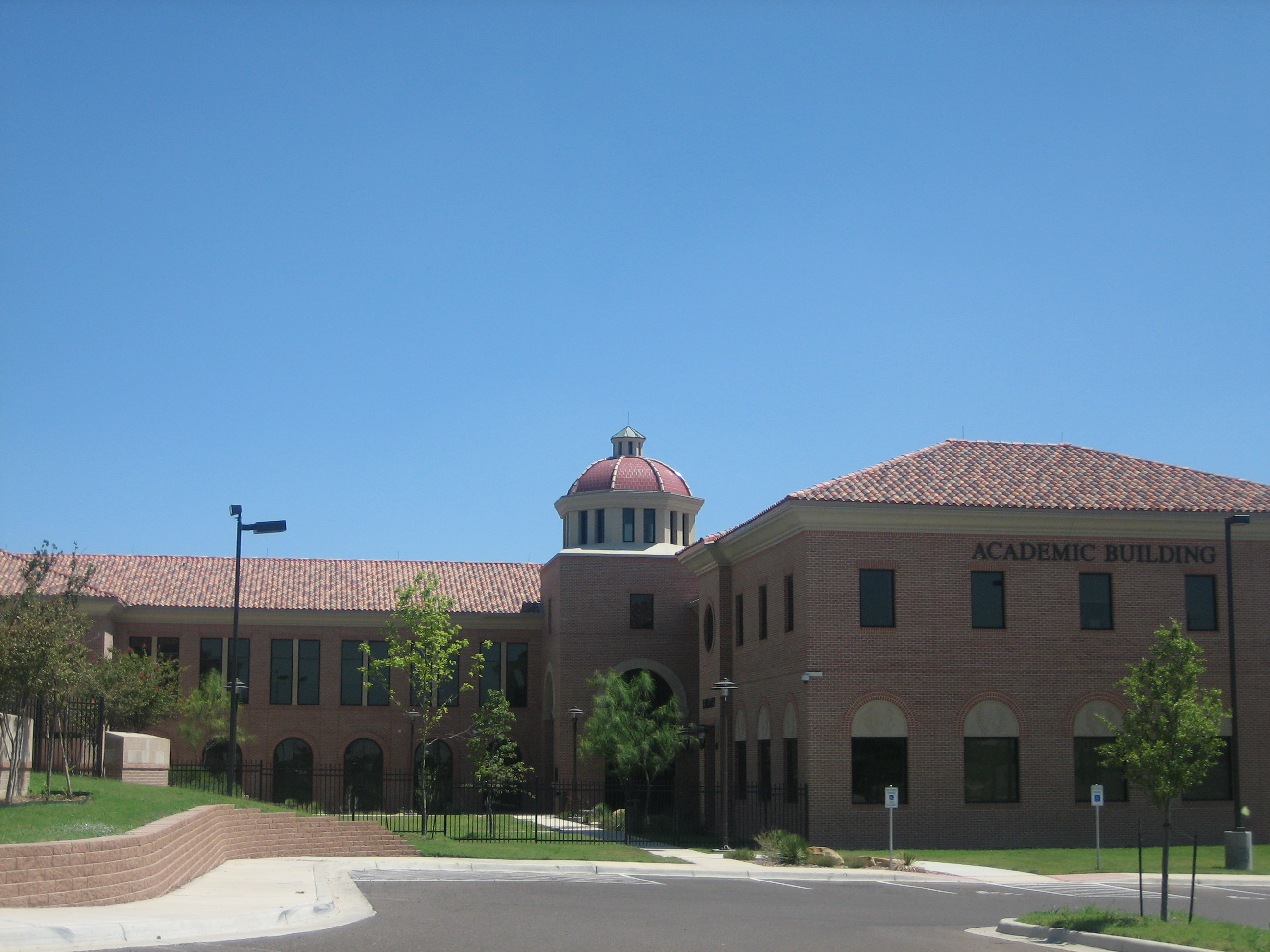
The Laredo Academic Building as seen from the northwest parking lot.

=== Laredo Veterans Affairs(VA) Outpatient Clinic ===
The Laredo VA Outpatient Clinic is owned by the University of Texas System and operated in conjunction with the UT Center at Laredo, the City of Laredo, and the United States Department of Veterans Affairs. The single-story building was constructed by the US Federal Properties Company and opened in 2013. To achieve a sense of cohesion, the building followed an architectural style similar to the aforementioned buildings.

=== Dental Program buildings ===
With the addition of the Bachelors of Science in Dental Hygiene program, from UT Health SA's School of Dentistry, in 2023, came the creation of three single-story portable buildings which house two classrooms and three "specialized" labs for the program.

=== Laredo Multipurpose Building ===
The Laredo Multipurpose Building is an under construction, three-story building designed by Alta Architects and Ayers Saint Gross to be constructed by Joeris General Contractors. Construction began in October of 2026. The first and second floors will be reserved for academic facilities, including classrooms, labs, and offices, and the third floor will be designated as shell space for building utilities and climate control. The project has been allocated a budget of US$62,380,778 with construction estimated to begin in June 2026. Once completed, the building will be the first permanent construction building erected under the UT Center at Laredo’s stewardship.

== Clinics ==
=== Dementia, Geriatric & Brain Health Clinic ===
The Dementia, Geriatric & Brain Health Clinic stems from the UT Health SA's Glenn Biggs Institute for Alzheimer's & Neurodegenerative Diseases and is operated on campus. This clinic provides the Laredo region with local access to neurology services, neuropsychology/diagnostic testing, genetic counseling, genetic testing, online support groups, support resources, and advanced treatment with clinical trials.

On May 23, 2025, US$1,400,000 was allocated for the "expansion" of the center's dementia clinic

=== Laredo VA Outpatient Clinic ===
The Laredo VA Outpatient Clinic, located at 4602 Bartlett Avenue, Laredo, Texas, one block north of the main academic buildings, offers primary care, mental health care, podiatry, pathology, and nutritional/dietary services for veterans. The clinic also has a pharmacy and laboratory on-site for prescribed medication and testing, respectively.

== Logos & Wordmarks ==
=== Logos ===
The UT Center at Laredo utilizes multiple variations of their name for branding across their website and social media accounts. While the center's website does not provide the center's official school colors, the colors of the horizontal, vertical, and simplified logos/wordmarks have three recurring colors: Orange , Navy Blue , and Light Blue (wordmarks and logos)/ (simple).

==== Simple Logo ====
In 2017, The University of Texas at Dallas (UT Dallas) faced issues with retaining its identity across social media platforms. This dilemma led to the creation of UT Dallas' simplified logo, the UTD Monogram, which aimed to solidify its brand and identity while maintaining the message of UTD's communications.

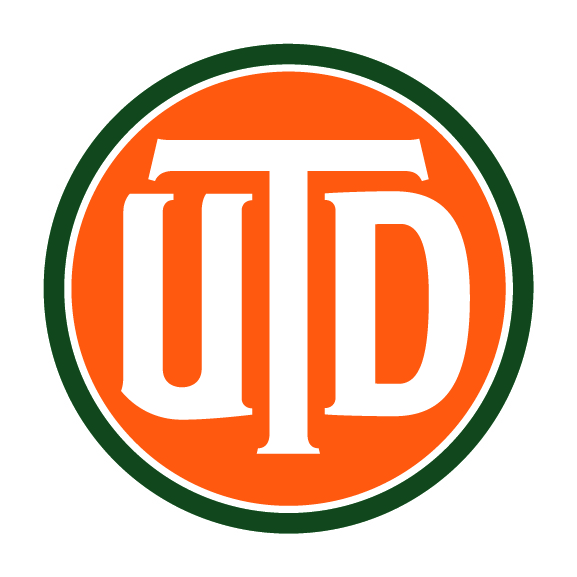
UTD Monogram

Similarly, the UT Center at Laredo employs a simplified logo for branding, and to maintain their identity and message across their social media accounts. The simplified logo features a shortened version of the center's name, "UT Center @ Laredo," in three different font styles and colors.

The UT Center at Laredo's simplified text logo: "UT Center @ Laredo"

==== Horizontal Logo ====
The UT Center at Laredo's horizontal logo features the Seal of the UT System to the right of the center's wordmark.

Horizontal logo featuring the UT System's Seal to the left

==== Vertical Logo ====
The UT Center at Laredo's vertical alternative logo depicts hierarchy by including the Seal of the UT System above the center's name.

Vertical alternative logo for The UT Center at Laredo featuring the Seal of the UT System above the center's vertically aligned name.

=== Wordmarks ===
UT Center at Laredo for a light contrast background.

UT Center at Laredo for a dark contrast wordmark.
