= Heidi Chumley =

American primary care physician and academic administrator

Dean of the Ross University School of Medicine
- Incumbent
- Assumed office 2021

Personal details
- Children: 5
- Education: Abilene Christian University; University of Texas Health Science Center at San Antonio; University of Miami

Heidi S. Chumley is an American primary care physician and academic administrator specializing in family medicine. She has served as dean of the Ross University School of Medicine since 2021. Chumley was provost of the American University of the Caribbean from 2013 to 2021.

== Early life and education ==
Chumley is from Seabrook, Texas. She attended Louisiana Tech University before transferring to Abilene Christian University as a freshman in September 1988 where she played on their basketball team. On December 17 the same year, she was diagnosed with Guillain–Barré syndrome. Chumley earned a bachelor's degree in biochemistry from Abilene Christian University. She completed a M.D. from the University of Texas Health Science Center at San Antonio. She completed her residency there in family medicine and a fellowship in academic leadership. Chumley earned an executive M.B.A. with an emphasis on Latin America and the Caribbean from the University of Miami.

== Career ==
Chumley practiced family medicine before entering academia. For eight years, Chumley worked at the University of Kansas School of Medicine including as the vice chancellor for educational resources and interprofessional education. She was its senior associate dean for medical education.

From 2013 to 2021, Chumley was the provost of the American University of the Caribbean.

In 2021, she became dean of the Ross University School of Medicine. Chumley heads Adtalem Global Education's academic council.

== Personal life ==
Chumley has five children.
