= Rochelle Buffenstein =

American biologist

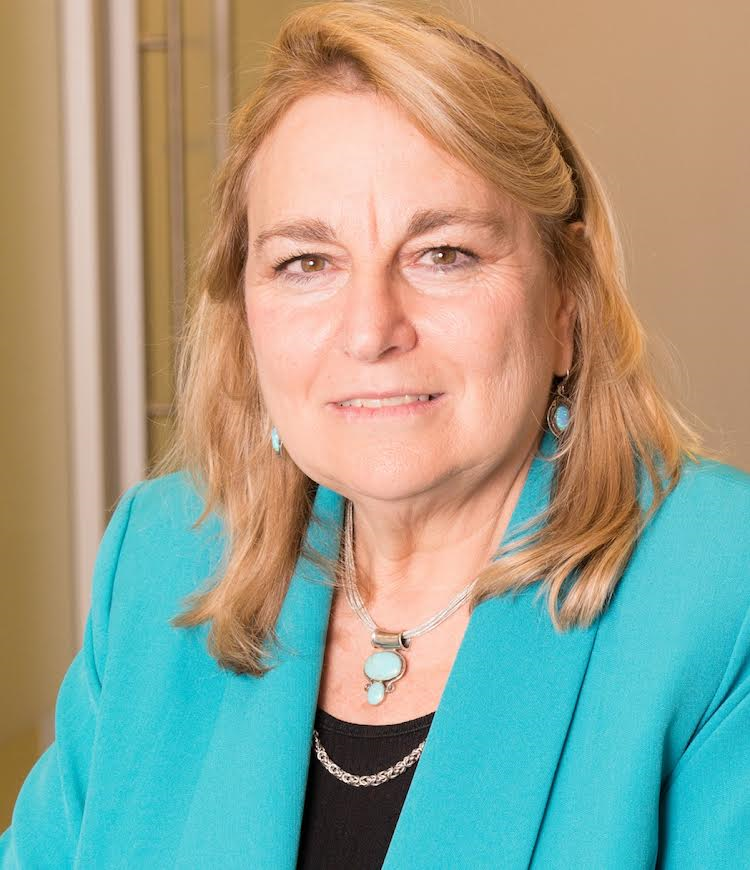
- Born: Harare, Zimbabwe
- Education: University of Cape Town, PhD
- Known for: Aging studies in naked mole-rats
- Scientific career
- Fields: Aging, Proteostasis
- Workplaces: University of Illinois Chicago Calico Life Sciences, a subsidiary of Alphabet Inc. Barshop Institute for Longevity and Aging Studies at the University of Texas Health Science Center at San Antonio

Rochelle Buffenstein is an American comparative biologist currently working as Research Professor at the University of Illinois Chicago. Previously, she was a senior principal investigator at Calico Life Sciences, an Alphabet, Inc. funded research and development company investigating the biology that controls aging and lifespan where she used the extraordinarily long-lived cancer resistant naked mole-rat as an attractive counter-example to the inevitability of mammalian aging; for at ages greatly exceeding the expected maximum longevity for this mouse-sized rodent, they fail to exhibit meaningful changes in age-related risk of dying or physiological decline. As such these rodents likely provide the blueprint for how to stave off myriad adverse effects of aging and provide proof of concept that age-related health decline can be avoided in humans.

== Early life and education ==
Rochelle was born in Harare, Zimbabwe and grew up on a farm in the Eastern Highlands. While at highschool she attended a talk by Dr. John Hanks on elephant population dynamics and was so enthralled by it that she decided she wanted a similar career in animal research. She attended the University of Cape Town, where while a student, she worked as a research assistant to Professor Jennifer Jarvis and went with her to Kenya in 1980 to study the behavior and ecology of naked mole-rats in their natural habitat, leading to the seminal discovery that naked mole-rats were eusocial. They returned to the laboratory with several colonies which she has maintained for more than three decades.

She completed her PhD under the mentorship of Professors Jennifer Jarvis and Gideon Louw where her dissertation addressed many aspects of the physiological ecology of rodents living in arid environments. Thereafter, Rochelle undertook a postdoctoral fellowship at the University of New South Wales in Sydney, Australia where she studied several aspects of the environmental physiology of red and eastern grey kangaroos under the guidance of Prof. Terence Dawson. Following this she worked at the University of California, Irvine with Professor Richard MacmIllen on the ecophysiology of desert rodents in the Owens Valley at the White Mountain Research Station.

== Career ==
Rochelle’s first tenured faculty position was in the department of physiology at the Medical School of the University of the Witwatersrand, Johannesburg, South Africa. Her early research was primarily field-based, and addressed physiological and molecular responses of various mammals to life in extreme environments. In this regard, she has worked with over 168 different species including desert rodents in Namibia and Kenya, tenrecs in Madagascar, mole-rats, golden moles, and bats in South Africa as well as marsupials in Australia.

Her career in the United States began at The City College of the City University of New York where she obtained numerous awards for her teaching. Bringing her colony of naked mole-rats with her, she began characterizing their negligible senescence in a collaborative study with Dr. Timothy O’Connor. Ten years later, she moved to the Barshop Institute for Longevity and Aging Studies at the University of Texas Health Science Center at San Antonio where she was a Professor in the department of Physiology and further expanded her aging research.

She is a fellow of the Gerontological Society of America and the American Aging Association and also was past chair of the Biological Sciences Section of the GSA and from 2013-2014 served as President of the American Aging Association. Rochelle is a fellow of the Cell Stress Society International.

== Research ==
Buffenstein's current research involves determining why some mammalian species can avoid the vagaries of aging and maintain good health for the majority of their long-lifespans. She uses a comparative biology approach to address age-related changes in physiological function, most notably cardiac function, and age-related diseases such as cancer and neurodegeneration. She pioneered the naked mole-rat as a model system in biomedical research. Not only does she currently maintain the world’s largest captive colony, but over the years she has provided thousands of animals to numerous laboratories across the globe to expand their use in various fields of biomedical research. Her laboratory, using a multiomic approach specifically focuses on physiological and molecular mechanisms that may contribute to the prolonged good health and longevity of naked mole-rats. She has conducted research demonstrating the astonishing finding that naked mole-rats defy the Gompertz–Makeham law of mortality. Her lab has investigated the role of the immune system and numerous aspects of proteostasis in the extraordinary resilience of naked mole-rats against many forms of stress and disease including UV radiation, hypoxia, carcinogen, and chemotherapy exposure.

Buffenstein has authored more than 200 publications. Along with two of her colleagues, Thomas J. Park and Melissa M. Holmes, she published The Extraordinary Biology of the Naked Mole-rat in 2021.
