= Steven N. Austad =

Biogerontologist

- Citizenship: American
- Education: University of California, Los Angeles (BA); California State University, Northridge (BS); Purdue University (PhD)
- Awards: Nathan A. Shock Award; Robert W. Kleemeier Award; Irving S. Wright Award of Distinction
- Scientific career
- Fields: Biogerontology, Biology of Aging
- Workplaces: University of Alabama at Birmingham (2014–present); University of Texas Health Science Center at San Antonio (2004–2013); University of Idaho (1993–2004); Harvard University (1986–1993)
- Website: www.stevenaustad.com

Steven N. Austad is the Protective Life Endowed Chair in Health Aging Research, a Distinguished professor and Chair of the Department of Biology at the University of Alabama at Birmingham from 2014 to 2022.

After earning a BA in English literature from UCLA, Austad left academia for a number of years during which among other things, he drove a taxi cab in New York City, worked as a newspaper reporter, and trained lions for television and movies. His interest in biology was awakened by his lion training, and he returned to academics to study biology more formally. He received a BS in biology from California State University, Northridge and his PhD in biology from Purdue University. After postdoctoral research at the University of New Mexico, he accepted a position as assistant professor in the Department of Organismic and Evolution Biology at Harvard University in 1986. Leaving Harvard as an associate professor in 1993, he moved to the University of Idaho where he became full professor. From 2004 to 2013, he was a professor at the University of Texas Health Science Center at San Antonio. He served as interim director of the Barshop Institute before moving to his current position in 2014.

Dr. Austad is the Founding Director of the UAB Nathan Shock Center of Excellence in the Basic Biology of Aging, one of only 6 such Centers in the United States. He is also Senior Scientific Director of the American Federation for Aging Research (AFAR), a New York-based philanthropic organization which supports basic and clinical research and training to support and advance healthy aging.

In the past, his research was primarily field-based, particularly with opossums. He discovered that opossums off the predator-free island of Sapelo Island lived 25% longer than their cousins on the mainland Georgia. Betting against S. Jay Olshansky, he predicted that there will be someone at least 150 years of age by the year 2150 who was born before 2000.

His current research interests include discovering why organisms age at different rates, particularly in especially long-lived organisms such as quahog clams and hydra. He is also interested in studying indicators of animal healthspan as well as the effects of rapamycin on mouse healthspan and sex differences in mechanisms of aging.

Dr. Austad's research and teaching have won multiple local, national, and international awards, including the Fifth Nathan A. Shock Award, the Robert W. Kleemeier award, Purdue University Outstanding Alumnus Award, the Irving S. Wright Award of Distinction, the Fondation IPSEN Longevity Prize, and the Caroline P. and Charles W. Ireland Prize for Scholarly Distinction. He is a fellow of the Gerontological Society of America and the American Association for the Advancement of Science. In 2021, he was appointed Protective Life Endowed Chair of Health Aging Research at the University of Alabama at Birmingham.

He is author of more than 200 scientific articles and more than 150 newspaper columns on science. His book Why We Age: What Science Is Discovering about the Body’s Journey Through Life has been translated into 8 languages. His new book, Methuselah's Zoo: what nature can teach us about living longer, healthier lives was released by MIT Press in 2022 and reviewed favorably in Science Magazine. Between 2012 and 2013, he wrote a series of biweekly columns for the San Antonio Express-News called "On Aging". Until recently, he currently wrote a similar biweekly column on science for AL.com as well as occasional pieces for the Huffington Post. These columns can be found at his website www.stevenaustad.com and a selection of them are available in a book titled To Err is Human, To Admit It is Not and other Essays (2022).

== Bibliography ==
- Austad, Steven N. (1999). Why We Age: What Science Is Discovering about the Body's Journey Through Life. Wiley. ISBN 978-0-471-29646-1.
- Methuselah's Zoo: What Nature Can Teach Us about Living Longer, Healthier Lives (2022)
- To Err Is Human, To Admit It Is Not and Other Essays (2022)
- Real People Don't Own Monkeys (2022)

== Academic positions ==
- Protective Life Endowed Chair in Health Aging Research, UAB (2021–present)
- Founding Director, UAB Nathan Shock Center of Excellence in the Basic Biology of Aging
- Senior Scientific Director, American Federation for Aging Research (AFAR)

== Selected publications ==
- Why We Age: What Science Is Discovering about the Body's Journey Through Life (1999)
- Methuselah's Zoo: What Nature Can Teach Us about Living Longer, Healthier Lives (2022)
- To Err Is Human, To Admit It Is Not and Other Essays (2022)
- Real People Don't Own Monkeys (2022)
