= George M. Rapier III =

American physician

George M. Rapier III is an American businessman, and chairman and CEO of WellMed Medical Management, Inc., a diversified healthcare company and Physicians Health Choice, a physician-owned Medicare Advantage Organization contracted with the Centers for Medicare and Medicaid Services (CMS). WellMed is headquartered in San Antonio, Texas. It is South Texas’ largest physician‐owned practice management company, specializing in senior health care, and the largest primary care provider for seniors in this region. Wellmed is affiliated with Optum, part of UnitedHealth Group.

Rapier is a Dallas native who earned his medical degree from the University of Florida College of Medicine. He interned at the University of Texas Health Science Center at San Antonio, and also completed his residency here. Since 1985, Rapier has been an assistant professor of medicine at the UT Health Science Center.

In September 2009 Modern Physician Magazine named Rapier Physician Entrepreneur Of The Year.

In October 2009 The Blake, Kimberly and George Rapier Charitable Trust donated $300,000 to SAMM Ministries, a homelessness prevention program.
