= Rate-of-living theory =

Theory of biological ageing

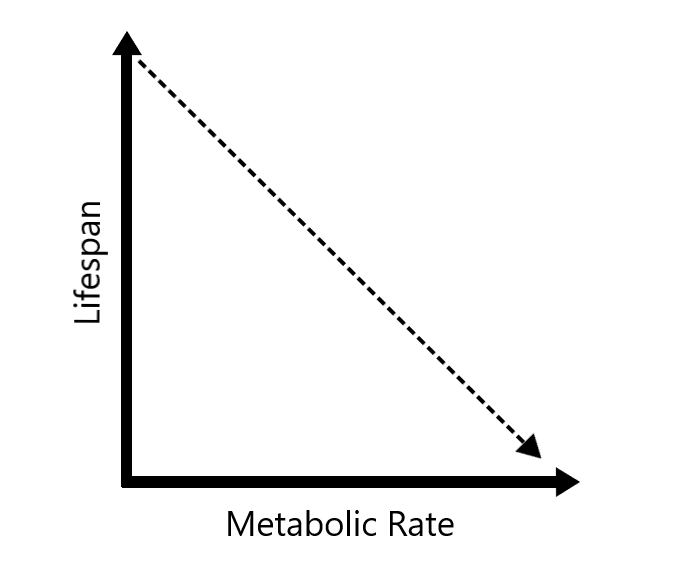
As metabolic rate increases, the lifespan of an organism is expected to decrease as a direct result. The rate at which this occurs is not fixed and thus the -45° slope in this graph is just an example and not a constant.

The rate of living theory postulates that the faster an organism's metabolism, the shorter its lifespan. First proposed by Max Rubner in 1908, the theory was based on his observation that smaller animals had faster metabolisms and shorter lifespans compared to larger animals with slower metabolisms. The theory gained further credibility through the work of Raymond Pearl, who conducted experiments on drosophila and cantaloupe seeds, which supported Rubner's initial observation. Pearl's findings were later published in his book, The Rate of Living, in 1928, in which he expounded upon Rubner's theory and demonstrated a causal relationship between the slowing of metabolism and an increase in lifespan.

The theory gained additional credibility with the discovery of Max Kleiber's law in 1932. Kleiber found that an organism's basal metabolic rate could be predicted by taking 3/4 the power of the organism's body weight. This finding was noteworthy because the inversion of the scaling exponent, between 0.2 and 0.33, also demonstrated the scaling for both lifespan and metabolic rate, and was colloquially called the "mouse-to-elephant" curve.

== Mechanism ==
Mechanistic evidence was provided by Denham Harman's free radical theory of aging, created in the 1950s. This theory stated that organisms age over time due to the accumulation of damage from free radicals in the body. It also showed that metabolic processes, specifically the mitochondria, are prominent producers of free radicals. This provided a mechanistic link between Rubner's initial observations of decreased lifespan in conjunction with increased metabolism.

== Current state of theory ==
Support for this theory has been bolstered by studies linking a lower basal metabolic rate (evident with a lowered heartbeat) to increased life expectancy. This has been proposed by some to be the key to why animals like the giant tortoise can live over 150 years.

However, the ratio of resting metabolic rate to total daily energy expenditure can vary between 1.6 and 8.0 between species of mammals. Animals also vary in the degree of coupling between oxidative phosphorylation and ATP production, the amount of saturated fat in mitochondrial membranes, the amount of DNA repair, and many other factors that affect maximum life span. Furthermore, a number of species with high metabolic rate, like bats and birds, are long-lived. In a 2007 analysis it was shown that, when modern statistical methods for correcting for the effects of body size and phylogeny are employed, metabolic rate does not correlate with longevity in mammals or birds.

== See also ==
- DNA damage theory of aging
- Life history theory
- Longevity quotient
