= Otto Heubner =

German internist and pediatrician

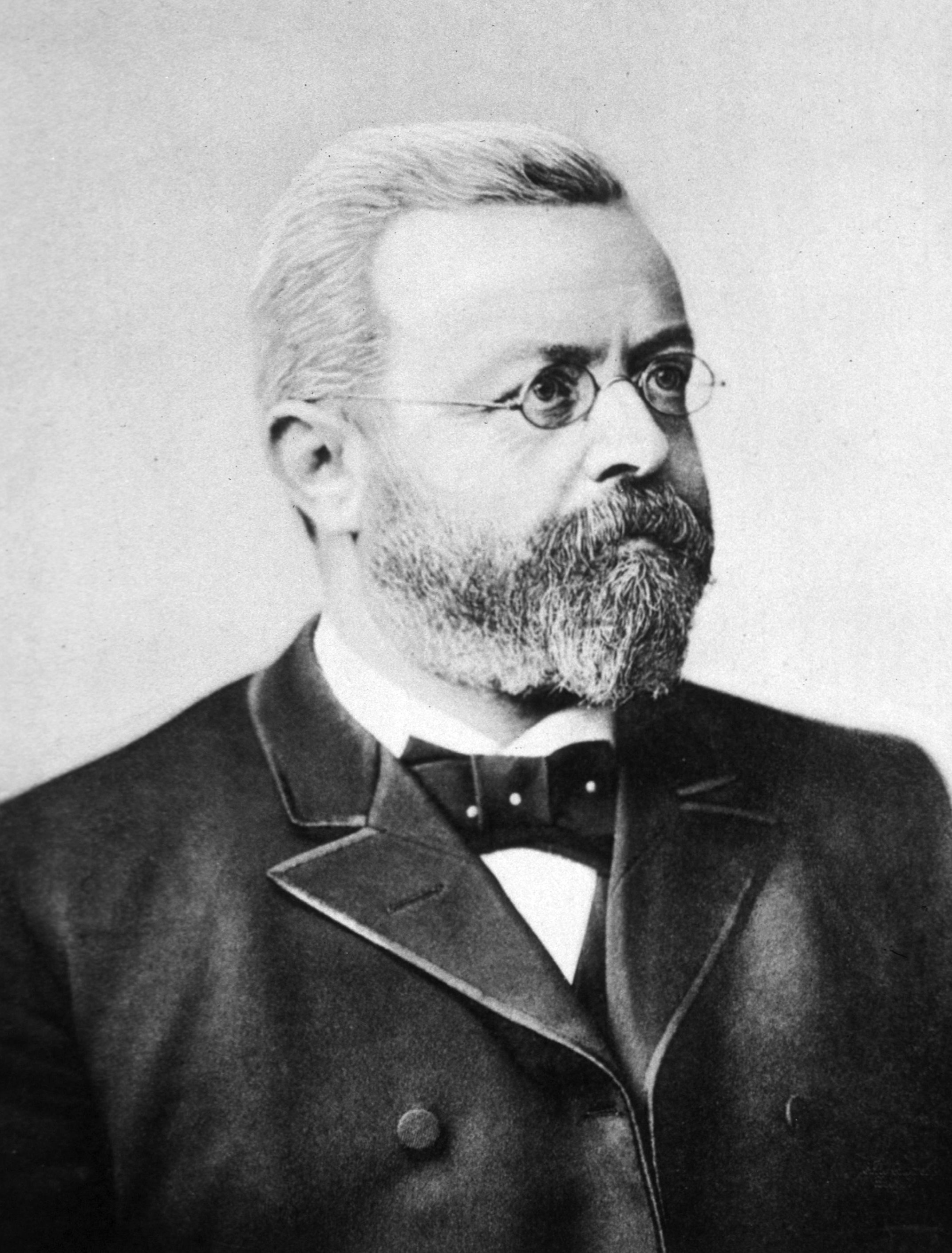
Otto Heubner

Johann Otto Leonhard Heubner (January 21, 1843 – October 17, 1926) was a German internist and pediatrician who was a native of Mühltroff.

He studied medicine at the University of Leipzig, and in 1867 became an assistant to Carl Reinhold August Wunderlich (1815–1877) at Leipzig. He later founded a children's hospital and clinic in Leipzig, and in 1891 was appointed to the chair of pediatrics. In 1894 he moved to Berlin, where he became director of the children's clinic and polyclinic at the Charité.

Heubner is considered one of the fathers of pediatric medicine. He also made important contributions to the treatment of infectious and gastrointestinal diseases. He was instrumental in improving infant mortality at the Charité, and introduced aseptic practices into the hospital environment.

With Max Rubner (1854–1932), he investigated energy metabolism in infants, creating the concept of a nutrition quotient. With Eduard Heinrich Henoch (1820–1910), he was among the first to use an antitoxin for diphtheria that had recently been developed by Emil von Behring (1854–1917). Heubner also made contributions in his research of cerebrospinal meningitis.

He provided an early description of syphilitic endarteritis obliterans, a condition that is sometimes referred to as "Heubner's disease". His name is also lent to "Heubner's artery", a cerebral artery that typically originates from the junction of the A 1 and A 2 segments of the anterior cerebral artery (ACA).

In 1999 the Otto Heubner Centrum für Kinder- und Jugendmedizin was founded at the University Hospital of the Charité-Berlin as a care center for young children and adolescents.
