= Max Rubner =

German physiologist and hygienist

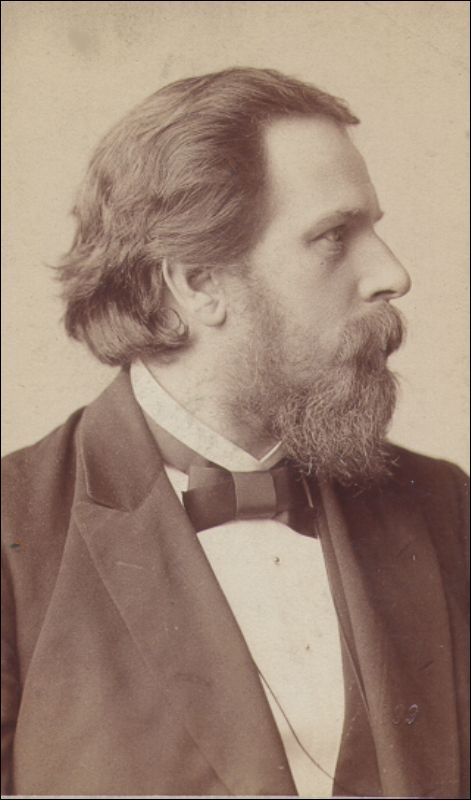
- Max Rubner
- Born: 2 June 1854; Munich, Kingdom of Bavaria
- Died: 27 April 1932 (aged 77); Berlin, Germany
- Education: Ludwig-Maximilians-Universität München
- Known for: Isodynamic law Rate-of-living theory
- Scientific career
- Fields: physiology
- Workplaces: Marburg University
- Doctoral advisor: Adolf von Baeyer; Carl von Voit

Max Rubner (2 June 1854, Munich – 27 April 1932, Berlin) was a German physiologist and hygienist.

== Academic career ==
He studied at the Ludwig-Maximilians-Universität München and worked as an assistant under Adolf von Baeyer and Carl von Voit, obtaining his doctorate in 1878. Later on, he taught as a professor at Marburg University (1885–1891), and in 1891 succeeded Robert Koch as a professor of hygiene at the Friedrich Wilhelm University of Berlin. In 1909, he succeeded Theodor Wilhelm Engelmann as chair of physiology at the Friedrich Wilhelm University of Berlin. Rubner was co-founder of the Kaiser-Wilhelm Institut für Arbeitsphysiologie, and became its director in 1913. With his assistant Gerhard Albrecht, Rubner set out to study labour not just as the expenditure of energy, but also the use of intellect. They rejected taylorism as being over-concerned with economic outputs, but rather advocated an approach which was more concerned with a biophysical approach to the elimination of fatigue.

== Contributions ==
Rubner is remembered for his research in metabolism, energy physiology, hygiene and dietary thermogenesis. His best-known research centers on what he termed the "isodynamic law" of calories (demonstrated in 1873, and published a decade later), according to which the form of human calorie intake is irrelevant to its effect on energy balance, often paraphrased as "a calorie is a calorie". In 1902, Rubner expressed his belief that this was over-simplistic, stating "the effect of specific nutritional substances upon the glands" may modify the effect of specific foods on energy balance, a view that is now increasingly accepted. With Otto Heubner (1843–1926), he performed important studies involving energy metabolism in infancy.

Rubner, who in 1902 established the laws of energy consumption in the body, is credited with the calorimetric determination of the energy from basic nutrients usable by the body, the so-called physiological calorific value: carbohydrates and proteins correspond to an energy intake of 1,717 kJ/100 g or 17.17 kJ/1 g (410 kcal/100 g or 4.1 kcal/1 g) and fat to an energy intake of 3,894 kJ/100 g or 38.94 kJ/1 g (930 kcal/100 g or 9.3 kcal/1 g), whereby these nutrients can replace each other energetically ("isodynamic law").

In 1885, Rubner accepted a call to the chair of hygiene and state medicine at the University of Marburg, initially as an associate professor and then in 1887 as a full professor. At that time, he was convinced that hygiene was merely applied physiology. In Marburg, he conducted work on thermal regulation, body surface area, and metabolism ("biological laws"). In 1891, Rubner succeeded Robert Koch as chair of hygiene at the Friedrich Wilhelm University of Berlin. In 1899, he became a member of the founding board of the German Society for Public Hygiene. A large new institute was built for him in 1905. In 1909, he moved to the chair of physiology, succeeding Theodor Wilhelm Engelmann. In 1909, he served as chairman of the Society of German Natural Scientists and Physicians. From 1913 to 1926, Rubner was also the director of the Kaiser Wilhelm Institute for Work Physiology in Berlin, which he co-founded. Several academic institutions emerged from this foundation: the Institute for Occupational Research (now the Max Planck Institute of Molecular Physiology) in Dortmund, as well as the chair of occupational medicine at the Institute of Occupational Medicine at the Charité in Berlin. Numerous works on the physiology of nutrition and metabolism were produced here, including the hygienic effects of clothing, climate, air, water, housing, and temperature, extending to questions regarding the nutrition of entire populations. As part of his calorimetric research, he described the specific dynamic action of organic nutrients and the surface area law (the fundamental predictability of an organism's energy metabolism according to its body surface area).

In 1883, Rubner introduced the "surface hypothesis", which stated that the metabolic rate of birds and mammals that maintain a steady body temperature is roughly proportional to their body surface area. Rubner is also known for his "rate-of-living theory", which proposed that a slow metabolism increases an animal's longevity. His observation was that larger animals outlived smaller animals and that the metabolic rates of larger animals were slower pro rata. The theory might have been inspired by the Industrial Revolution by the logic that the more a machine is worked, the sooner it will wear out.

In 1894, Rubner established the validity of the principle of conservation of energy in living organisms, and from 1896 to 1903, he clarified the influence of hypothermia on metabolism as well as the effect of heat (conduction, radiation, evaporation) on energy loss. Together with Otto Heubner, he conducted studies in 1898/1899 on the metabolism of healthy and atrophic infants. Furthermore, he spent years researching the dietary energy requirements of specific professions. Rubner coined the terms "protein minimum" (the minimum daily protein intake required to maintain a balance between nitrogen intake and excretion) and "wear-and-tear quota" (daily nitrogen loss without protein intake). In 1914, Rubner defined 100 g of protein per day as the "hygienic protein minimum" for adults. According to Rubner, lifespan is a function of energy expenditure (see rate-of-living theory).

During World War I, Rubner was active in the field of national nutrition, investigating issues related to changing dietary habits caused by increasing urbanization and social shifts, as well as the consequences of the Allied blockade (famine) on the civilian population (1918). During the final years of his life, drawing from his research on nutrition and metabolism, he expanded his focus to broader humanitarian issues: global food security, the struggle for survival, hunger, malnutrition, disease, and poor living and health conditions.

Rubner was notoriously reserved and possessed a sense of sarcastic humor. As a researcher, he was meticulously precise and highly inventive, designing his own calorimetric apparatuses. Rubner can be considered the founder of scientific nutritional physiology, physicochemical experimental hygiene, as well as scientific occupational physiology, occupational medicine, and applied physiology.

== See also ==
- Rubner Peak
