= Long School of Medicine =

Medical school in San Antonio, Texas, US

Coordinates: 29.507562°N 98.575393°W

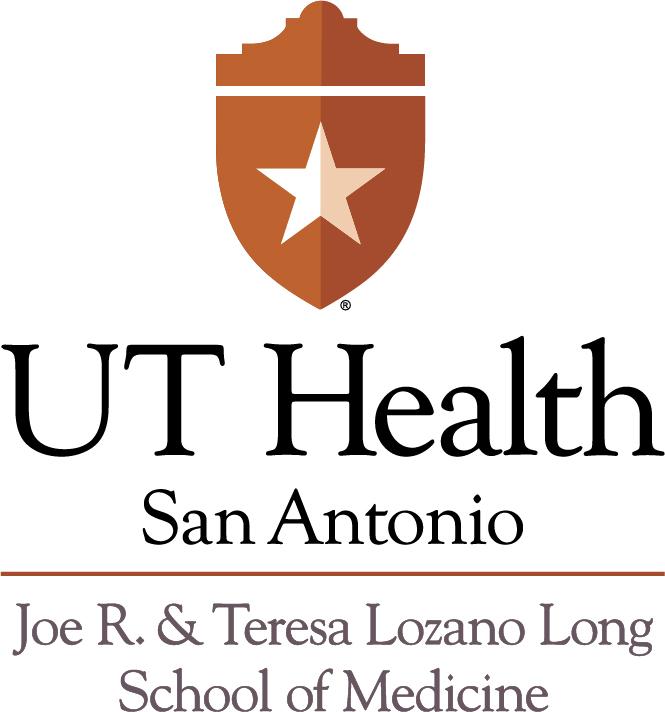
- Type: Public Medical school
- Established: 1959
- Parent institution: The University of Texas Health Science Center at San Antonio
- Location: San Antonio, Texas

The Joe R. and Teresa Lozano Long School of Medicine is the medical school of University of Texas Health Science Center at San Antonio. It is one of sixteen medical schools in the state of Texas. The medical school is located in San Antonio, Texas.

== Budget ==
The school's budget in 2009 was $415 million.

== Rankings ==
- U.S. News & World Report ranked the school 42nd nationally in primary care in 2010.
- University ranked 6th in the nation in clinical medicine research impact for the period 2001 to 2005.
- Ranked 51st in the world in the 2010 clinical medicine rankings.
- 1st for Hispanics in the medical school category.
- 1st in National Institutes of Health funding for aging research.
- Ranked 48th in NIH funding for research grants among 3,181 institutes in 2004.
- 10th in NIH funding for Cellular and Structural Biology.
- 17th in NIH funding for Physiology.

== University hospital ==
The school's main teaching hospital is the University Health System, and was ranked among the top 50 hospitals in the U.S. in kidney disorders in 2010.

== Departments ==
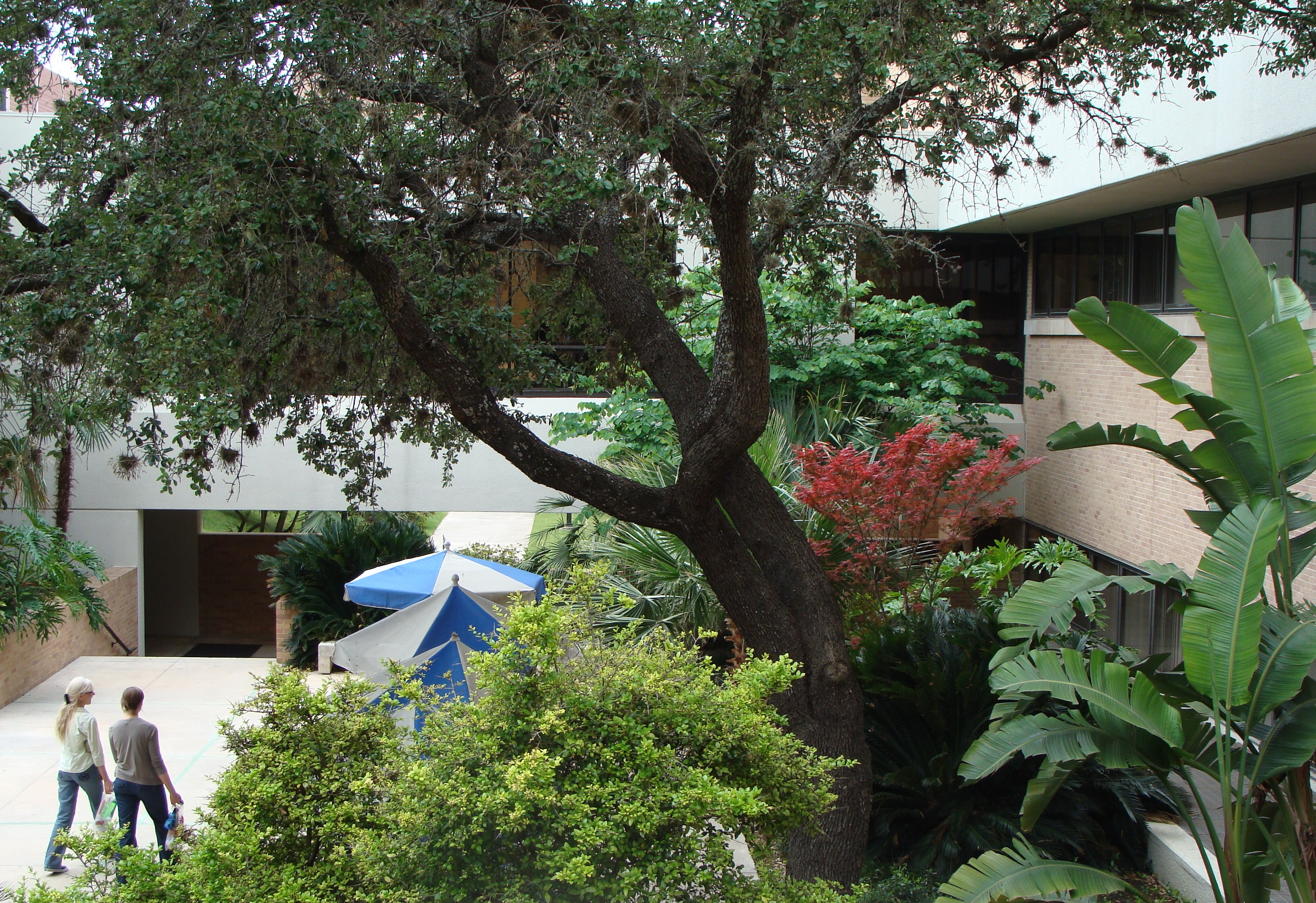

The departments are:

- Anesthesiology
- Cardiology
- Cardiothoracic Surgery
- Emergency Medicine
- Epidemiology and Biostatistics
- Family & Community Medicine
- Hepatology
- Medicine
- Neurology
- Neurosurgery
- Obstetrics and Gynecology
- Ophthalmology
- Orthopaedics
- Otolaryngology
- Pediatrics
- Psychiatry
- Radiation Oncology
- Radiology
- Rehabilitation Medicine
- Surgery
- Urology
