= Dolph Briscoe Jr. Library =

University library in San Antonio, Texas

Coordinates: 29.5064°N 98.5749°W

Dolph Brisco Jr. Library
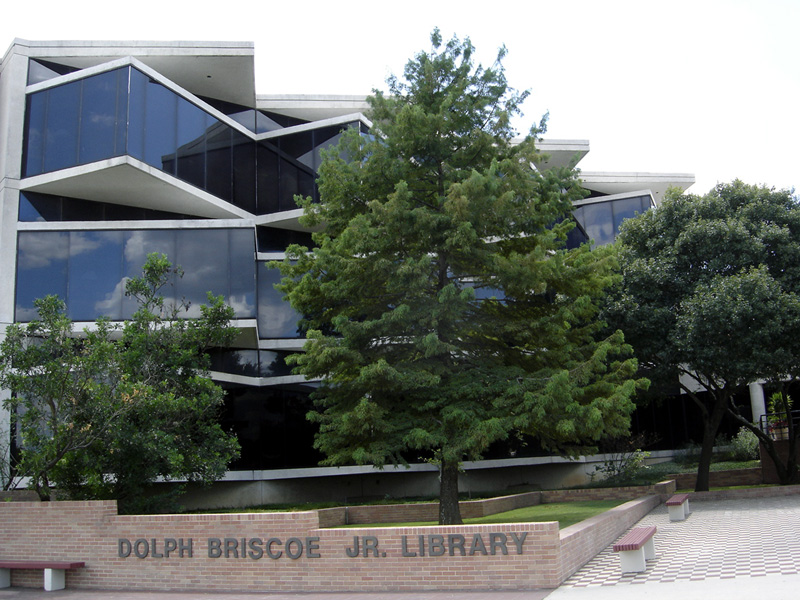
- Location: 7703 Floyd Curl Drive San Antonio, TX
- Established: 1983
- Branch of: University of Texas Health Science Center at San Antonio Libraries

The Dolph Briscoe Jr. Library is the central library of the University of Texas Health Science Center at San Antonio library system. It is located in South Texas Medical Center in San Antonio, Texas, US.

The award-winning library was designed by Kell Muñoz Architects. Completed in 1983, it was named in 1985 after Dolph Briscoe.

In 2005, the library was awarded the nation's highest library award for their outreach programs. The award was presented to the library by the first lady, Laura Bush.

== Special collections ==
The library is notable for a rare book collection, the only such repository in south and central Texas. The P.I. Nixon collection is home to over 5000 rare medical texts dating from the 15th to the early 20th century:

- The Canon of Medicine by Avicenna
- Anatomy of Melancholy by Burton, 1632 edition.
- De Medicina by Celsus, 1481 edition.
- The Micrographia by Robert Hooke
- De Humani Corporis Fabrica by Vesalius, 1543 edition
- Tables of the Skeleton and Muscles of the Human Body by Bernhard Siegfried Albinus, printed 1749

Original copies also exist by Nostradamus, Galen, Mascagni, Hieronymus Brunschwig, Bernardino Genga, and Withering.
