= S. Jay Olshansky =

American sociologist and biogerontologist

- Born: Stuart Jay Olshansky; February 22, 1954 (age 72)
- Education: Michigan State University, B.S. (1975); University of Chicago, M.S. (1982); University of Chicago, Ph.D. (1984)
- Known for: Gerontology
- Website: www.sjayolshansky.com

Stuart Jay Olshansky is an emeritus professor in the School of Public Health at the University of Illinois at Chicago concentrating on biodemography and gerontology and was co-founder and chief scientist at Lapetus Solutions, Inc.

He is also a research associate at the Center on Aging (University of Chicago) and at the London School of Hygiene and Tropical Medicine. Olshansky is an associate editor of the Journal of Gerontology: Biological Sciences and Biogerontology and is a member of the editorial boards of several other scientific journals. Olshansky has been working with colleagues in the biological sciences to develop the modern "biodemographic paradigm" of mortality – an effort to understand the biological nature of the survival and dying out processes of living organisms. The focus of his research has been on estimates of the upper limits to human longevity, exploring the health and public policy implications associated with individual and population aging, forecasts of the size, survival, and age structure of the population, pursuit of the scientific means to slow aging in people (The Longevity Dividend), and global implications of the re-emergence of infectious and parasitic diseases, and insurance linked securities.

== Biography ==
Olshansky was born on February 22, 1954. He attended Michigan State University and was awarded a B.S. in psychology in 1975. He then attended the University of Chicago and was awarded a M.S. in sociology in 1982. He received his Ph.D. in sociology at the University of Chicago in 1984.

His work on biodemography has been funded by a Special Emphasis Research Career Award and an Independent Scientist Award from the National Institute on Aging and a research grant from the U.S. Social Security Administration starting in 1991.

In 2011 he published an article on the longevity of United States presidents in the Journal of the American Medical Association.

Olshansky was the recipient of a 2005/2006 Senior Fulbright Award to lecture in France. In 2010 he was made fellow of the Gerontological Society of America; and in 2016 he received the Irving S. Wright Award from the American Federation for Aging Research and the Kent Award from the Gerontological Society of America.

Olshansky has been a vocal supporter of scientific attempts to increase the human healthspan. He is an advocate for prolonging the healthy life-span compared to increasing the overall length of life as such. In an interview he advocated for further study of calorie restriction, genetic study of humans centenarians, and for further study on life extension and senescence. He is co-author with Bruce A Carnes of The Quest for Immortality: Science at the Frontiers of Aging (Norton, 2001) and with Jim Kirkland and George Martin he co-edited "Aging: The Longevity Dividend", published in 2015.

== Lifespan Bet ==
On September 15, 2000, after American biologist Steven N. Austad was quoted in Scientific American as saying "The first 150-year old person is probably alive right now", he and Olshansky made their famous Lifespan Bet on whether someone born before the year 2000 will still be living and be of sound mind on January 1, 2150. Austad bet in favor. Olshansky took the view that it was unlikely anyone would live past 130. Austad and Olshansky put $150 each into an investment fund, with the money and interest to go to the winner, or his descendants, in 2150. They later staked another $150 each.
