= Barshop Institute =

US research institute

Sam and Ann Barshop Institute for Longevity and Aging Studies
- Established: 2001
- Mission: To understand the basic biology of aging and to discover therapies that treat and cure age-related diseases by fostering dynamic, collaborative research; educating and training future scientists and clinicians; and promoting public awareness of age-related issues.
- Director: Elena Volpi
- Key people: Adam Salmon – Associate Director
- Address: 4939 Charles Katz Drive
- Location: San Antonio, Texas
- Website: barshopinstitute.uthscsa.edu

The Sam and Ann Barshop Institute for Longevity and Aging Studies is a basic and clinical research institute located on the Greehey Academic and Research Campus of the University of Texas Health Science Center at San Antonio (UTHSCSA). It is a leading institute in the United States in geriatrics research. The Barshop Institute ranks #1 in National Institute on Aging funding among Texas institutions and is highly ranked in the country in National Institute of Health funding. The scientific director of the institute has been Elena Volpi, M.D., PhD, FGSA since July 2023. In 2009, one of the research projects of the institute was announced by Science magazine as one of the top scientific discoveries of the year.

The Barshop Institute is home to several prestigious National Institute on Aging (NIA) research centers and programs, including the Nathan Shock Center, the Claude D. Pepper Older Americans Independence Center, the Center for Alzheimer's Disease and Related Dementias Population Aging and Social Studies, and the Interventions Testing Program. Collectively, these NIH-supported initiatives advance the Institute's mission to uncover the biological mechanisms of aging, develop interventions that prevent or treat age-related diseases, and promote healthier aging across the lifespan. The Institute also fosters the next generation of aging researchers through its NIH-funded Biology of Aging Training Program (T32), which provides postdoctoral and predoctoral trainees with comprehensive research training and opportunities to design, conduct, and present innovative aging research to the broader scientific community.

== Research ==
More than 160 faculty members at the University of Texas Health Science Center at San Antonio are actively involved in biomedical and clinical research and educational activities that range from the molecular genetics of aging to issues of health care for the elderly population. Research at the Barshop Institute spans the continuum from basic discovery science to translational and clinical research aimed at extending healthspan and improving quality of life in older adults. Investigators study the fundamental biological processes that drive aging—including cellular senescence, mitochondrial dysfunction, metabolism, inflammation, genomic instability, and impaired tissue regeneration—and apply these discoveries to develop strategies for preventing or treating age-related diseases. Major areas of investigation include Alzheimer's disease and related dementias, cardiovascular disease, type 2 diabetes and metabolic disorders, cancer, frailty, sarcopenia, osteoporosis, and age-associated liver disease. Through the integration of laboratory research, animal models, clinical trials, and population-based studies, Barshop Institute scientists are advancing new therapeutic approaches that target the underlying mechanisms of aging to delay the onset of chronic disease, preserve physical and cognitive function, and promote healthy longevity.

== Centers ==
=== San Antonio Nathan Shock Center ===
The San Antonio Nathan Shock Center (NSC) is one of only eight National Institute on Aging (NIA)-funded Nathan Shock Centers of Excellence in the Basic Biology of Aging in the United States. Since its establishment in 1995, the Center has served as an internationally recognized resource dedicated to advancing the fundamental biology of aging and accelerating the development of interventions that promote healthy aging and extend healthspan. The overarching mission of the Center is to identify the molecular, cellular, and physiological mechanisms that drive the aging process and translate these discoveries into strategies that delay or prevent age-associated diseases and functional decline.

The San Antonio Nathan Shock Center provides investigators with an integrated, "one-stop-shop" research infrastructure that supports every stage of aging research—from experimental design and animal model development to functional phenotyping, pathology, metabolism, pharmacology, and data interpretation. This comprehensive approach enables investigators to conduct rigorous, multidisciplinary studies that examine lifespan, healthspan, and the biological mechanisms underlying aging. By integrating specialized expertise and state-of-the-art technologies within a single research environment, the Center accelerates scientific discovery while promoting collaboration among investigators locally, nationally, and internationally.

The Center is organized around six highly integrated research cores that provide specialized services and scientific expertise. The Administrative and Program Enrichment Core coordinates Center activities, provides biostatistical support, promotes community engagement, and facilitates career development through seminars, workshops, and the internationally recognized Masoro-Barshop Conference on Aging. The Aging Animal and Functional Assessment Core offers access to aged animal colonies, longevity studies, and comprehensive assessments of physical and physiological function. The GeroMetabolism Core provides advanced metabolomic, lipidomic, and metabolic phenotyping capabilities that enable investigators to examine metabolic mechanisms underlying aging and age-related diseases. The Pathology Core delivers expert histopathologic evaluation and disease phenotyping across multiple organ systems, while the Pharmacology and Drug Design Core supports the identification, optimization, and evaluation of pharmacological interventions targeting aging pathways. Finally, the Research Development Core expands aging research by providing pilot funding, mentorship, trainee support, and access to Center resources for investigators both within UT Health San Antonio and across the United States.

A distinguishing strength of the San Antonio Nathan Shock Center is its commitment to developing the next generation of geroscientists. Through pilot grant programs, mentorship initiatives, trainee internships, educational workshops, and collaborative research opportunities, the Center provides critical support for early-stage investigators pursuing careers in aging research. Investigators nationwide may compete for pilot funding and access to the Center's specialized cores, fostering new collaborations and expanding the national aging research community. These activities complement the Barshop Institute's NIH-funded Biology of Aging Training Program (T32), creating a rich educational environment for predoctoral students, postdoctoral fellows, and junior faculty.

=== Claude D. Pepper Older Americans Independence Center ===
The San Antonio Claude D. Pepper Older Americans Independence Center (OAIC) is one of only fifteen National Institute on Aging (NIA)-funded Pepper Centers in the United States. Established in 2015, the Center serves as the translational arm of the Barshop Institute's aging research enterprise, with the overarching goal of improving the health, physical function, and independence of older adults. In partnership with the South Texas Veterans Health Care System Geriatric Research, Education and Clinical Center (GRECC), the Center brings together basic scientists, clinician investigators, epidemiologists, and population scientists to translate discoveries in the biology of aging into interventions that preserve functional independence and improve quality of life.

The San Antonio Pepper Center is nationally recognized as the first Claude D. Pepper Center organized around the principles of geroscience—the concept that aging itself is the primary biological risk factor underlying most chronic diseases and functional decline. Rather than studying age-related diseases in isolation, investigators focus on the fundamental mechanisms of aging that contribute to conditions such as frailty, sarcopenia, mobility impairment, cardiovascular disease, type 2 diabetes, Alzheimer's disease and related dementias, and other chronic disorders affecting older adults. By targeting the biological processes responsible for aging, researchers seek to develop interventions capable of delaying or preventing multiple age-related diseases simultaneously while extending healthspan and maintaining independence. Particular emphasis is placed on addressing health disparities and improving outcomes among the diverse and medically underserved populations of South Texas, who experience an earlier onset of chronic disease and functional decline than many other U.S. populations.

The Pepper Center provides a comprehensive translational research infrastructure that supports investigators from laboratory discovery through clinical implementation. Its integrated research cores offer expertise in clinical investigation, geriatric phenotyping, biostatistics, epidemiology, population science, biomarker development, physiology, metabolism, and implementation science. These shared resources enable investigators to design and conduct highly sophisticated clinical and translational studies focused on preserving muscle function, mobility, cognition, metabolic health, and resilience in aging adults. The Center also serves as a hub for multidisciplinary collaborations that bridge preclinical discoveries with human clinical trials, accelerating the translation of promising interventions into evidence-based strategies that can be implemented in clinical practice.

A defining feature of the San Antonio Pepper Center is its commitment to developing the next generation of clinician-scientists and translational investigators in aging research. Through pilot project funding, multidisciplinary mentorship, educational seminars, career development programs, and collaborative research opportunities, the Center provides early-stage investigators with the resources necessary to establish independent research programs. Junior faculty benefit from access to experienced mentors across multiple disciplines, specialized research cores, and opportunities to participate in multicenter studies and national collaborations. These efforts are closely integrated with the Barshop Institute's NIH-funded Biology of Aging Training Program (T32), creating a comprehensive environment for training predoctoral students, postdoctoral fellows, clinical fellows, and junior faculty in translational geroscience and geriatrics.

=== Center for Alzheimer's Disease and Related Dementias Population Aging and Social Studies ===
The Center for Alzheimer's Disease and Related Dementias Population Aging and Social Studies (CAPAS) is a National Institute on Aging (NIA)-funded research center dedicated to advancing the understanding of Alzheimer's disease and related dementias (AD/ADRD) through multidisciplinary population science. The Center brings together investigators from epidemiology, demography, sociology, economics, psychology, public health, geriatrics, neurology, and biomedical sciences to examine the complex biological, behavioral, environmental, and social factors that influence cognitive aging and dementia risk. By integrating diverse scientific disciplines, CAPAS seeks to identify modifiable determinants of cognitive decline and generate evidence that informs strategies for preventing dementia, reducing disability, and promoting healthy cognitive aging across the lifespan.

The Center's research focuses on understanding how demographic characteristics, socioeconomic conditions, education, health behaviors, chronic disease, healthcare access, neighborhood environments, and social relationships interact with biological aging to influence the development and progression of Alzheimer's disease and related dementias. Investigators utilize large national and international longitudinal cohort studies, population surveys, administrative datasets, electronic health records, and advanced statistical modeling to examine risk and protective factors affecting cognitive health. This multidisciplinary approach allows researchers to identify vulnerable populations, characterize disparities in dementia incidence and outcomes, and evaluate interventions that may delay cognitive decline and improve quality of life for aging individuals.

A defining strength of CAPAS is its emphasis on health equity and the study of historically underrepresented populations. Investigators examine racial, ethnic, geographic, and socioeconomic disparities in dementia risk, diagnosis, treatment, caregiving, and healthcare utilization, with particular attention to Hispanic, rural, and medically underserved communities throughout South Texas and the United States. By investigating the social determinants of brain health alongside biological mechanisms of aging, the Center provides critical insights into why dementia disproportionately affects certain populations and identifies opportunities to reduce inequities through targeted prevention strategies, public health initiatives, and healthcare policy.

The Center also serves as an important resource for methodological innovation in population aging research. Faculty develop and apply advanced analytical approaches—including longitudinal data analysis, causal inference methods, machine learning, geospatial analysis, and health services research—to better understand the complex interactions among aging, chronic disease, cognitive decline, and social determinants of health. These capabilities enable investigators to translate large-scale observational data into evidence that informs clinical practice, community interventions, and national health policy.

In addition to its research mission, CAPAS is committed to developing the next generation of investigators in population aging and dementia research. Through pilot project funding, interdisciplinary mentorship, educational seminars, collaborative workshops, and research training opportunities, the Center supports early-career investigators pursuing research at the intersection of aging, dementia, and population health. Trainees benefit from access to nationally recognized experts in aging research, diverse population datasets, and collaborative opportunities spanning basic science, clinical research, epidemiology, and social science. These activities complement the Barshop Institute's NIH-funded Biology of Aging Training Program (T32) and foster a highly collaborative environment for training future leaders in Alzheimer's disease and aging research.

=== Interventions Testing Program ===
The Interventions Testing Program (ITP) is one of three National Institute on Aging (NIA)-supported testing sites that comprise the nationally coordinated Interventions Testing Program. The ITP was established by the NIA to rigorously evaluate pharmacological, nutritional, and biological interventions with the potential to extend lifespan, improve healthspan, and delay the onset of age-related diseases. Through a highly standardized, multi-institutional testing framework, the Program identifies interventions that target the fundamental biology of aging rather than individual diseases, providing critical preclinical evidence to guide future translational and clinical research.

The Barshop Institute serves as a major testing center within the national ITP consortium, collaborating closely with partner institutions to conduct large-scale lifespan and healthspan studies using genetically heterogeneous mouse models. Unlike studies utilizing inbred strains, the genetically diverse mice employed by the ITP more closely reflect the genetic variability observed in human populations, increasing the translational relevance of study findings. Candidate interventions are proposed by investigators from across the scientific community and undergo a rigorous scientific review process before being selected for testing. Each intervention is evaluated simultaneously at all participating ITP sites using identical experimental protocols, animal husbandry practices, dosing regimens, and outcome measures, ensuring exceptional scientific rigor, reproducibility, and confidence in the results.

Research conducted through the ITP has significantly advanced the field of geroscience by identifying interventions that reproducibly increase lifespan and improve measures of healthspan. Investigators evaluate a wide range of compounds and therapeutic strategies targeting key biological mechanisms of aging, including nutrient-sensing pathways, cellular senescence, mitochondrial function, proteostasis, inflammation, oxidative stress, autophagy, stem cell maintenance, and metabolic regulation. In addition to determining effects on longevity, studies assess functional outcomes such as physical performance, metabolic health, cardiovascular function, cognitive performance, cancer incidence, immune function, and age-related pathology. These comprehensive phenotypic assessments provide valuable insights into how interventions influence both lifespan and the quality of aging.

The Barshop Institute's extensive aging research infrastructure substantially enhances the capabilities of the Interventions Testing Program. Investigators have access to internationally recognized expertise in aging biology, comparative pathology, geriatric physiology, metabolism, pharmacology, molecular biology, and biostatistics, as well as state-of-the-art core facilities through the Nathan Shock Center of Excellence in the Basic Biology of Aging and the Claude D. Pepper Older Americans Independence Center. This integrated environment enables comprehensive mechanistic investigations that complement lifespan studies, allowing researchers to determine not only whether an intervention is effective, but also how it influences the biological processes underlying aging.

The Interventions Testing Program also provides exceptional opportunities for scientific collaboration and investigator development. Faculty, postdoctoral fellows, and trainees participate in multidisciplinary research teams that span basic biology, translational science, pathology, pharmacology, and bioinformatics. Through participation in experimental design, animal studies, data analysis, and dissemination of findings, trainees gain firsthand experience conducting rigorous, large-scale preclinical aging research. These opportunities are further strengthened through integration with the Barshop Institute's NIH-funded Biology of Aging Training Program (T32), providing comprehensive education in experimental geroscience and translational aging research.

== Clinical Research and Clinical Trials ==
Clinical research at the Barshop Institute is dedicated to translating discoveries in the biology of aging into interventions that improve healthspan, preserve functional independence, and prevent or delay the onset of chronic age-related diseases. The Institute maintains a robust clinical research infrastructure that supports Phase I–IV clinical trials, investigator-initiated studies, and multicenter collaborations spanning basic translational research through large-scale clinical investigations. Investigators conduct studies involving older adults across a broad spectrum of aging-related conditions, including frailty, sarcopenia, metabolic dysfunction, obesity, type 2 diabetes, cardiovascular disease, Alzheimer's disease and related dementias, mobility impairment, osteoporosis, and other chronic conditions that disproportionately affect aging populations. Clinical trials evaluate novel therapeutics, lifestyle interventions, nutritional strategies, exercise programs, and repurposed medications designed to improve physical function, cognitive health, metabolic resilience, and overall quality of life.

The Institute's clinical research enterprise is strengthened through close collaboration among physician-scientists, basic scientists, biostatisticians, epidemiologists, rehabilitation specialists, nutrition experts, and clinical research professionals. These multidisciplinary teams leverage the Barshop Institute's nationally recognized aging research programs—including the Nathan Shock Center of Excellence in the Basic Biology of Aging, the Claude D. Pepper Older Americans Independence Center, the Center for Alzheimer's Disease and Related Dementias Population Aging and Social Studies (CAPAS), and the Interventions Testing Program—to rapidly translate mechanistic discoveries into human studies. This integrated research environment enables investigators to evaluate interventions targeting the fundamental biological mechanisms of aging rather than focusing solely on individual diseases, reflecting the principles of geroscience that underpin the Institute's research mission.

A landmark addition to the Institute's clinical research portfolio is the Validation and Intervention Testing for Aging, Longevity and Healthspan (VITAL-H) clinical trial, supported by a contract of up to $38 million from the Advanced Research Projects Agency for Health (ARPA-H) through its Proactive Solutions for Prolonging Resilience (PROSPR) program. As the coordinating center for this first-of-its-kind national healthspan clinical trial, the Barshop Institute is leading an unprecedented effort to determine whether FDA-approved medications can slow the biological processes of aging and preserve health and functional capacity before the onset of chronic disease. The VITAL-H study will evaluate the effectiveness of rapamycin, dapagliflozin, and semaglutide in generally healthy adults between the ages of 60 and 65, using innovative measures of intrinsic capacity and healthspan rather than traditional disease-specific endpoints. This groundbreaking study represents one of the first large-scale clinical trials specifically designed to target aging itself as a modifiable biological process, with the long-term goal of delaying the development of multiple chronic diseases simultaneously and extending years of healthy, independent living.

The ARPA-H PROSPR award positions the Barshop Institute as a national leader in the emerging field of gerotherapeutics and establishes one of the largest federally funded clinical research programs dedicated to healthy longevity in the United States. Beyond evaluating promising interventions, the program is expected to establish new clinical trial methodologies, validate biomarkers and measures of biological aging, and provide a regulatory framework for future healthspan-focused therapeutics. Through collaborations with academic institutions, healthcare systems, and industry partners across the country, the Institute is helping build the scientific foundation necessary for future preventive therapies that target aging as the common biological driver of many chronic diseases.

The Barshop Institute conducts clinical trials aimed at translating laboratory discoveries into interventions for the treatment of age-related diseases. Its research brings together basic biology, translational science, clinical investigation, and population health, with a focus on understanding the aging process, and identifying approaches to extend healthspan, or the period of life spent in good health.

== Training and Education ==
=== NIA T32 Training Program for Research Scientists in the Biology of Aging ===
The NIA T32 Training Program for Research Scientists in the Biology of Aging is one of the nation's premier institutional training programs dedicated to preparing the next generation of leaders in geroscience. Established through support from the National Institute on Aging (NIA), the program provides rigorous multidisciplinary research training for both predoctoral (PhD and MD/PhD) students and postdoctoral fellows pursuing careers in the basic, translational, and clinical biology of aging. For more than three decades, the program has trained investigators who have gone on to become independent scientists, faculty members, and leaders in academia, government, and industry, significantly contributing to advances in aging biology and age-related disease research.

The overarching goal of the training program is to develop independent investigators capable of translating discoveries in the fundamental biology of aging into interventions that improve healthspan and reduce the burden of age-associated diseases. Trainees receive individualized, mentor-guided research experiences that integrate molecular, cellular, organismal, and translational approaches to understanding the mechanisms that drive biological aging. The curriculum emphasizes the principles of geroscience—the concept that targeting the biological processes of aging can simultaneously delay or prevent multiple chronic diseases—providing trainees with a broad scientific foundation while encouraging innovative, interdisciplinary research.

A defining strength of the T32 program is its structured approach to career development. Each trainee develops an individualized training plan with guidance from a primary mentor and multidisciplinary mentoring committee. The program combines intensive laboratory research with didactic coursework, journal clubs, works-in-progress seminars, grant-writing workshops, responsible conduct of research training, scientific communication, peer-review experience, and individualized career development planning. Regular evaluations ensure that trainees achieve progressive scientific independence while developing the professional skills necessary to compete successfully for fellowships, career development awards, and independent research funding.

The training environment emphasizes collaboration across basic, translational, and clinical research disciplines. Through participation in institute-wide seminars, center activities, collaborative research projects, and national scientific meetings, trainees interact with internationally recognized investigators and gain exposure to diverse scientific perspectives and emerging technologies. Access to state-of-the-art core facilities—including genomics, proteomics, metabolomics, imaging, pathology, bioinformatics, and animal model resources—provides trainees with advanced technical expertise while promoting interdisciplinary approaches to complex problems in aging research.

The Barshop Institute's T32 program is distinguished by its long-standing record of success in preparing independent investigators. Since its inception in 1988, the program has trained numerous scientists who have established successful research careers and obtained competitive NIH fellowships, career development awards, and independent research grants. The continued success of its alumni reflects the program's commitment to scientific excellence, mentorship, collaborative research, and the development of future leaders dedicated to advancing the biology of aging and translating discoveries into interventions that extend healthy lifespan.

=== Medical Student Training in Aging Research (MSTAR) ===
The University of Texas Medical Student Training in Aging Research (UT-MSTAR) is an NIH-funded T35 short-term research training program administered by the Barshop Institute and supported by the National Institute on Aging. Established in 2025, the program is directed by Elena Volpi, MD, PhD, FGSA, and represents a unique statewide collaboration among the four largest medical schools in The University of Texas System: UT Health San Antonio, UTHealth Houston, UT Medical Branch, and UT Southwestern Medical Center. The program was created to address the growing national need for physician-scientists with expertise in aging research and geriatric medicine by introducing medical students to aging research early in their professional training.

UT-MSTAR provides approximately 20 first-year medical students each year with an intensive eight-week summer research experience under the mentorship of accomplished investigators conducting basic, translational, clinical, behavioral, and population-based aging research. Students are paired with faculty mentors whose research encompasses the biology of aging, geroscience, Alzheimer's disease and related dementias, cardiovascular disease, metabolic disorders, frailty, sarcopenia, health disparities, and other age-related conditions. Through individualized research projects, trainees gain practical experience in study design, experimental methods, data analysis, scientific communication, and responsible conduct of research while developing an appreciation for interdisciplinary approaches to aging science.

In addition to mentored research, UT-MSTAR offers a structured educational curriculum that includes seminars on aging biology, geriatrics, research ethics, biostatistics, grant writing, scientific presentations, and career development. Students also participate in clinical shadowing experiences with geriatricians and clinician-scientists, allowing them to observe the translation of aging research into patient care and better understand the complex medical, functional, and psychosocial needs of older adults. At the conclusion of the program, trainees present their research at the annual UT-MSTAR consortium meeting and are encouraged to present their work at national scientific conferences.

The long-term objective of UT-MSTAR is to strengthen the national pipeline of physician-scientists dedicated to aging research by fostering sustained interest in geriatrics, geroscience, and translational research. Through individualized mentorship, multidisciplinary training, clinical exposure, and collaboration across four UT medical schools, the program equips future physicians with the scientific foundation, research skills, and professional networks needed to pursue careers focused on improving the healthspan, independence, and quality of life of older adults. As an integral component of the Barshop Institute's comprehensive research training portfolio, UT-MSTAR complements the Institute's graduate and postdoctoral training programs while expanding opportunities for early-career investigators to enter the field of aging research.
