= UT Health San Antonio Cancer Center =

Medical research institute in the United States

Coordinates: 29.513535°N 98.579059°W

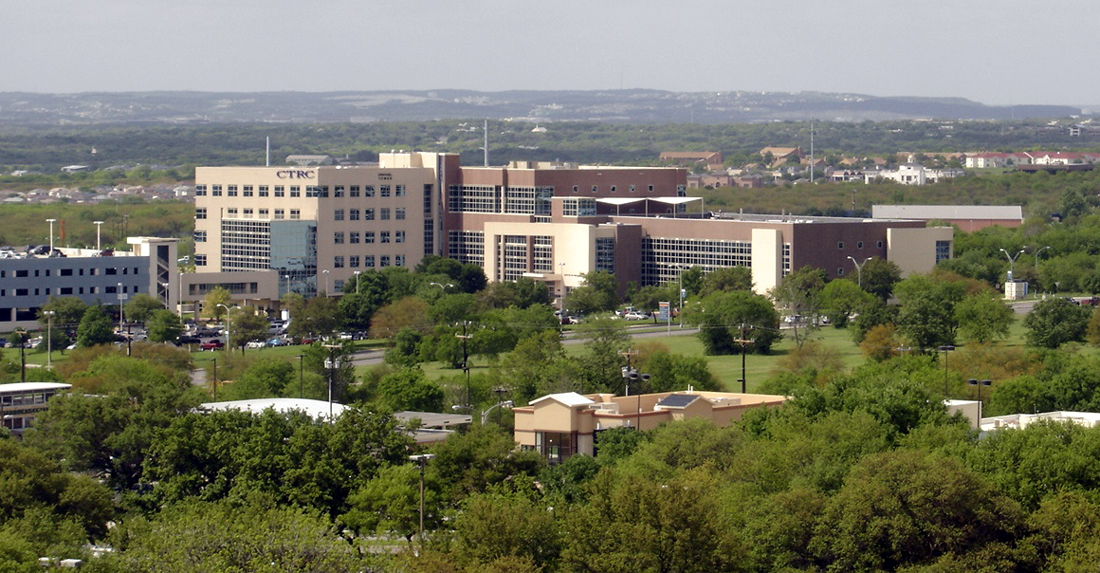
The CTRC is a major component of the University of Texas Health Science Center.

UT Health San Antonio Cancer Center, founded in 1974, is an NCI-designated Cancer Center in San Antonio, Texas. It is a component of the University of Texas Health Science Center, San Antonio which is located adjacently.

The center serves more than 4.4 million people in the high-growth corridor of Central and South Texas including Austin, San Antonio, Laredo and the Rio Grande Valley, and handles more than 120,000 patient visits each year, and has a faculty staff of 140.
