= University of Texas Health Science Center at San Antonio =

Academic hospital in San Antonio, Texas, US

The University of Texas at San Antonio Health Science Center
- Motto: Disciplina, Praesidium, Civitatis
- Motto in English: "The cultivated mind is the guardian genius of democracy"
- Type: Public academic health science center
- Established: 1959
- Parent institution: The University of Texas at San Antonio
- Endowment: $781 million (FY 23)
- President: Taylor Eighmy
- Faculty: 2,400
- Total staff: 8,500
- Students: 4,759
- Undergraduates: 3,656
- Postgraduates: 1,103
- Location: San Antonio, Texas, United States; 29.506°N 98.576°W
- Campus: 250 acres (100 ha); Urban
- Website: www.uthscsa.edu

The University of Texas at San Antonio Health Science Center (UT San Antonio Health Science Center) is a public academic health science center in San Antonio, Texas and is the medical education, and clinical branch of UT San Antonio consisting of the Health Science Center Campus, and the medical enterprise still known as UT Health San Antonio.

It is located in the South Texas Medical Center and serves San Antonio and all of the 50,000 square miles (130,000 km^{2}) area of Central and South Texas. It extends to campuses in the Texas border communities of Laredo and the Lower Rio Grande Valley.

The UT San Antonio Health Science Center produces more than 42,550 graduates; more than 4,700 students a year train in an environment that involves more than 100 affiliated hospitals, clinics and health care facilities in South Texas. The university offers more than 65 degrees, the large majority of them being graduate and professional degrees, in the biomedical and health sciences fields.

The Health Science Center Campus is home to the Mays Cancer Center, which is in partnership with the MD Anderson Cancer Center and is a designated a National Cancer Institute Cancer Center. The Mays Cancer Center's Institute for Drug Development (IDD) is internationally recognized for conducting one of the largest oncology Phase I clinical drug trials programs in the world. Fifteen of the cancer drugs most recently approved by the U.S. Food & Drug Administration underwent development or testing at the IDD. Other noted programs include: cellular and structural biology, urology, nephrology, transplantation biology, aging and longevity studies, cardiology and research imaging. UT San Antonio Medical School publishes a periodic magazine, Mission.

In August 2024, the University of Texas Board of Regents announced that the University of Texas at San Antonio and UT Health Science Center at San Antonio would merge to form a "world class university in San Antonio." The integrated universities will retain the UTSA name.

On August 22, 2025 the university was soft launched into the merger as part of the new UT San Antonio branding. The merger officially took effect on September 1, 2025, effectively folding UT Health SA into the new UT San Antonio.

== History ==
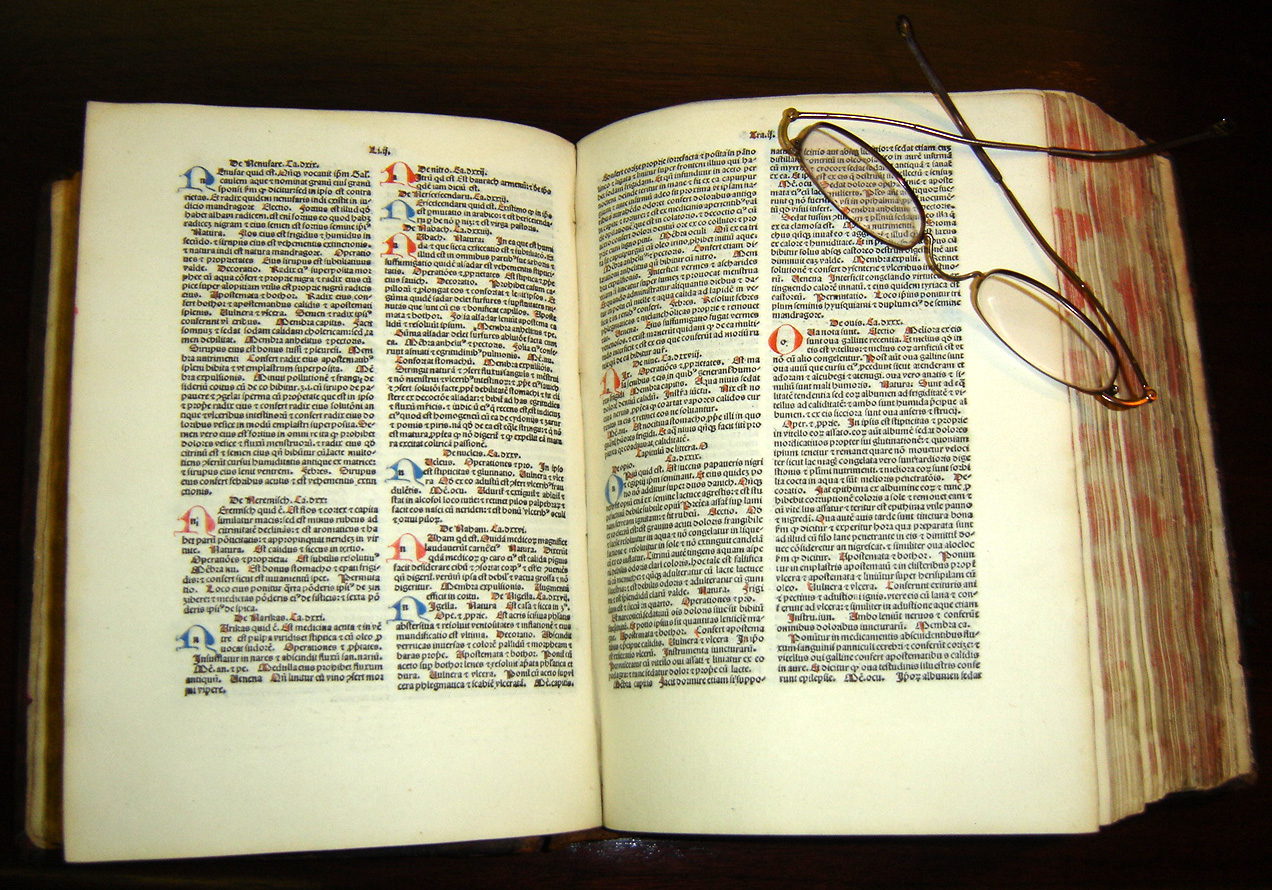
A Latin copy of Avicenna's Canon of Medicine, dated 1484, located at the P.I. Nixon Medical Historical Library

- 1959: South Texas Medical School is chartered.
- 1966: First class of 15 students is admitted to the Medical School; temporarily housed at Trinity University.
- 1969: Legislature authorizes creation of Dental School.
- 1970: Legislature authorizes School of Nursing.
- 1972: School of Allied Health Sciences and Graduate School of Biomedical Sciences created Institution is officially designated The University of Texas Health Science Center at San Antonio. Frank Harrison, M.D., Ph.D., appointed first president.
- 1976: Responsibility for the School of Nursing is transferred to the U. T. Health Science Center from the U. T. Nursing School at Austin.
- 1987: Gift of $15 million from H. Ross Perot finances creation of Institute of Biotechnology.
- 1992: National Institutes of Health funds HSC researchers' work on the Human Genome Project.
- 1998: State Legislature authorizes creation of a Regional Academic Health Center in the Lower Rio Grande Valley (RAHC), to be administered by the Health Science Center’s Medical School.
- 1999: Health Science Center is designated to receive a $200 million public endowment from the State of Texas to establish a Children’s Cancer Research Institute Construction begins on South Texas Centers for Biology in Medicine at the Texas Research Park.
- 2002: The Regional Academic Health Center in the Lower Rio Grande Valley (RAHC) opens its doors for medical students and residents.

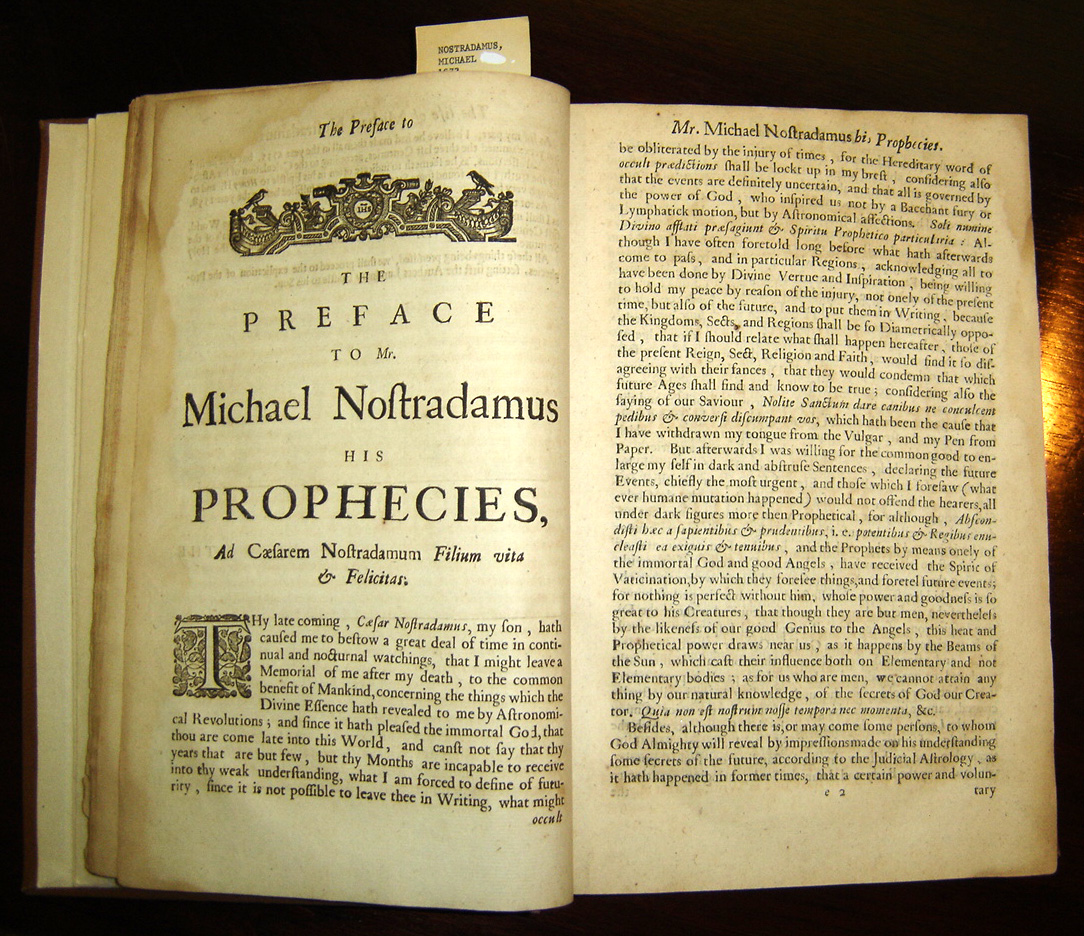
Copy of Garencières' 1672 English translation of the Propheties, located in The P.I. Nixon Medical History Library

- 2003: Health Science Center receives largest grant to date for a $37 million study of small subcortical strokes. Health Science Center and UT San Antonio establish the San Antonio Life Sciences Institute, a collaborative research and education partnership. A $300 million initiative announced to build a Research Tower in the South Texas Medical Center and recruit leading scientists for it.
- 2004: Health Science Center dedicates $50 million Children's Cancer Research Institute.
- 2006: The Regional Academic Health Center - Medical Research Division (E-RAHC) School of Medicine | UTRGV was dedicated April 25, 2006 on the campus of UT Pan American in Edinburg. Also administered by the Health Science Center, this division provides laboratory space and equipment for research on critical health problems of the South Texas/Border Region.
- 2007: Health Science Center receives a $25 million donation from the Greehey Family Foundation.
- 2007: Valero Energy Corporation donates $5 million to the university.
- 2007: The Cancer Therapy & Research Center is acquired by the Health Science Center.
- 2007: Health Science Center receives a $25 million donation from Joe R. and Teresa Lozano Long. The central campus is renamed the Joe R. and Teresa Lozano Long Campus.
- 2007: The second facility was dedicated at The Regional Academic Health Center in the Lower Rio Grande Valley campus - the Academic and Clinical Research building. This facility houses the RAHC clinical research center and also the South Texas VA Health Care Center.
- 2008: University Hospital announces plans for a $1 billion expansion that includes a new trauma tower.
- 2011: The Liaison Committee on Medical Education (LCME) put the Medical School on probation. The LCME cited curricular issues as a central feature that prompted the probationary status
- 2013: The Liaison Committee on Medical Education (LCME) removed the Medical School from its probation list.
- 2025: The University of Texas Health Science Center San Antonio merges with The University of Texas at San Antonio to create UT San Antonio.

=== 2010 Failed merger with University of Texas at San Antonio ===
State Senator Leticia Van de Putte championed the creation of a special advisory group that would research the benefits of a possible merger between the Health Science Center and the University of Texas at San Antonio (UTSA), which is also located on the city's northwest side. In 2010, the special advisory group, headed by Peter T. Flawn, former president of both UTSA and the University of Texas at Austin, concluded that a merger would not be in the best interest of the two institutions. Among its key arguments were that both institutions had strong leadership already on a positive trajectory, the merger would be a short-term distraction for UTHSCSA, and the benefit to UTSA's national stature would be slight.

The Health Science Center has a public–private partnership that is designed to promote research at the institution. The $300 million project, titled "The Campaign for the Future of Health", seeks to build new infrastructure with the South Texas Research Facility and the President's Excellence Fund.

== Campuses ==
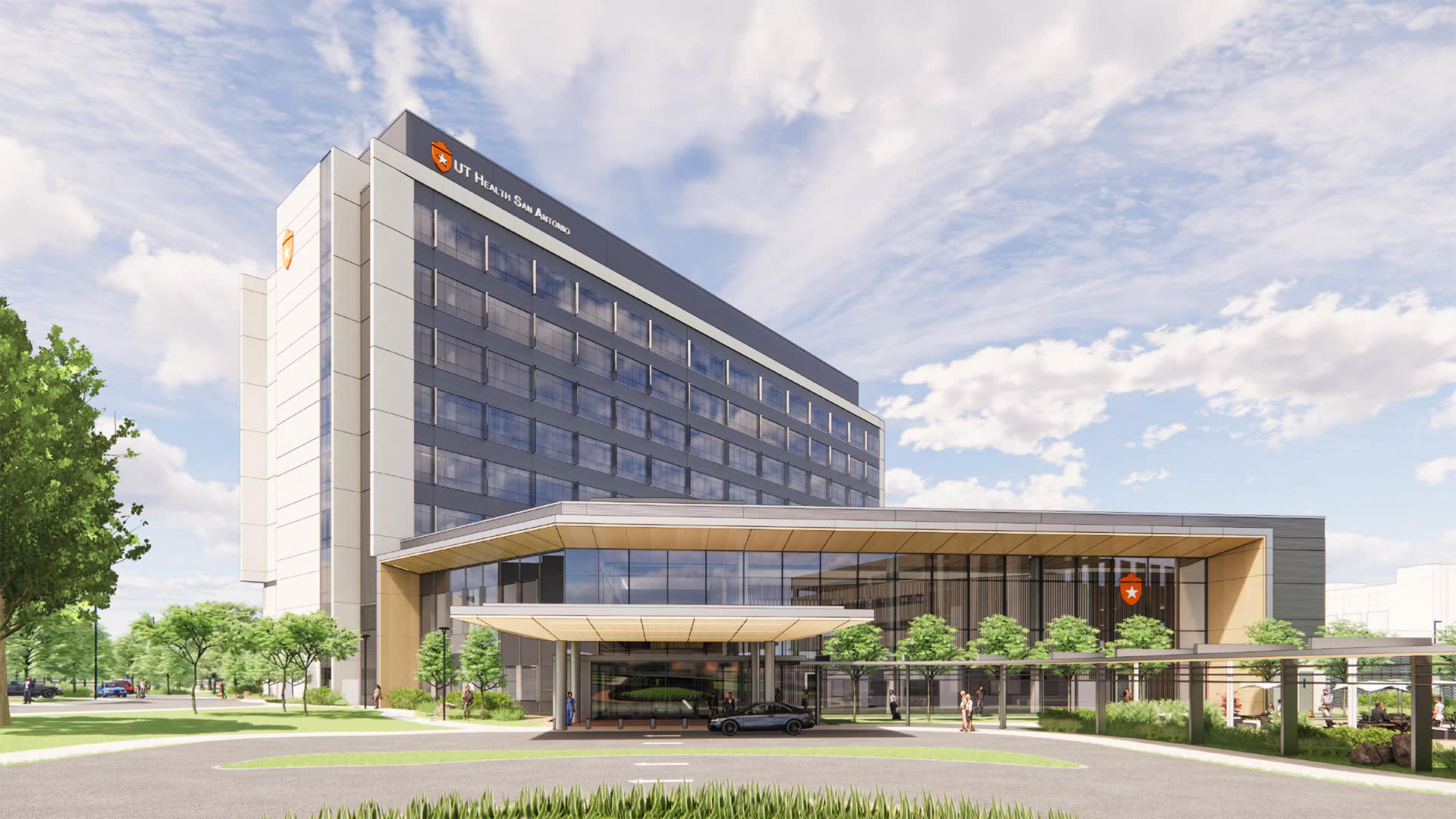
Renderings of the new Half-a-billion-dollar Multispecialty and Research Hospital. Adding more than 800 health care jobs, is projected to open in the late fall of 2024.

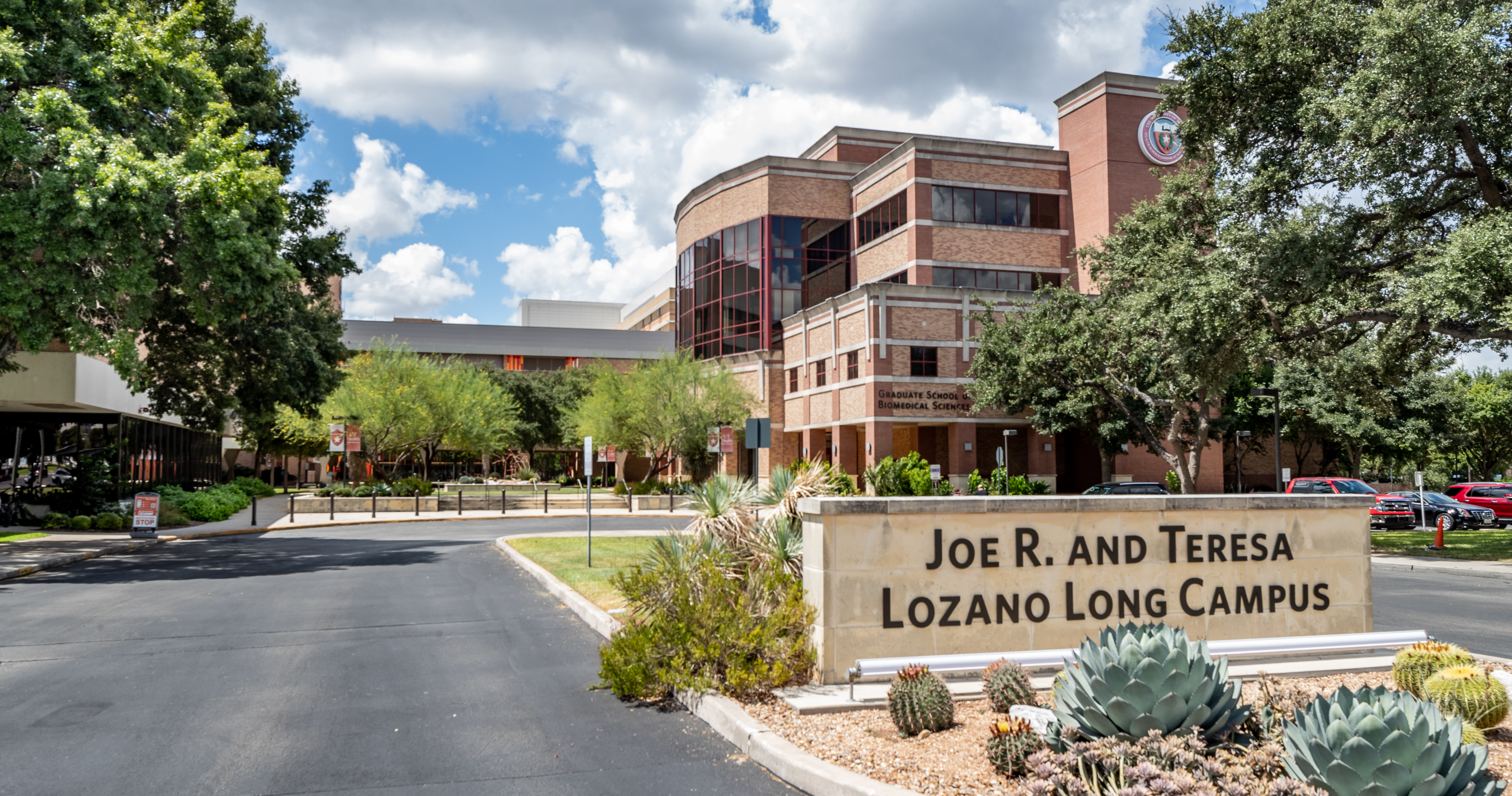
Main (Long) Campus Entrance

UT Austin's Pharmacy School is partially located on this campus. The school has eight campuses, spanning 250 acres (1.0 km^{2}) in total:

- Joe R. and Teresa Lozano Long Campus
- Greehey Academic and Research Campus
- Center for Oral Health Care & Research (COHR)
- Multispecialty and Research Hospital
- Texas Research Park Campus
- Medical Arts & Research Center
- Cancer Therapy & Research Center at UT Health San Antonio
- Regional Academic Health Center (RAHC) Harlingen
- Regional Academic Health Center - Edinburg (ERAHC) Edinburg
- Former UTHSCSA Laredo Campus

=== Campus design ===
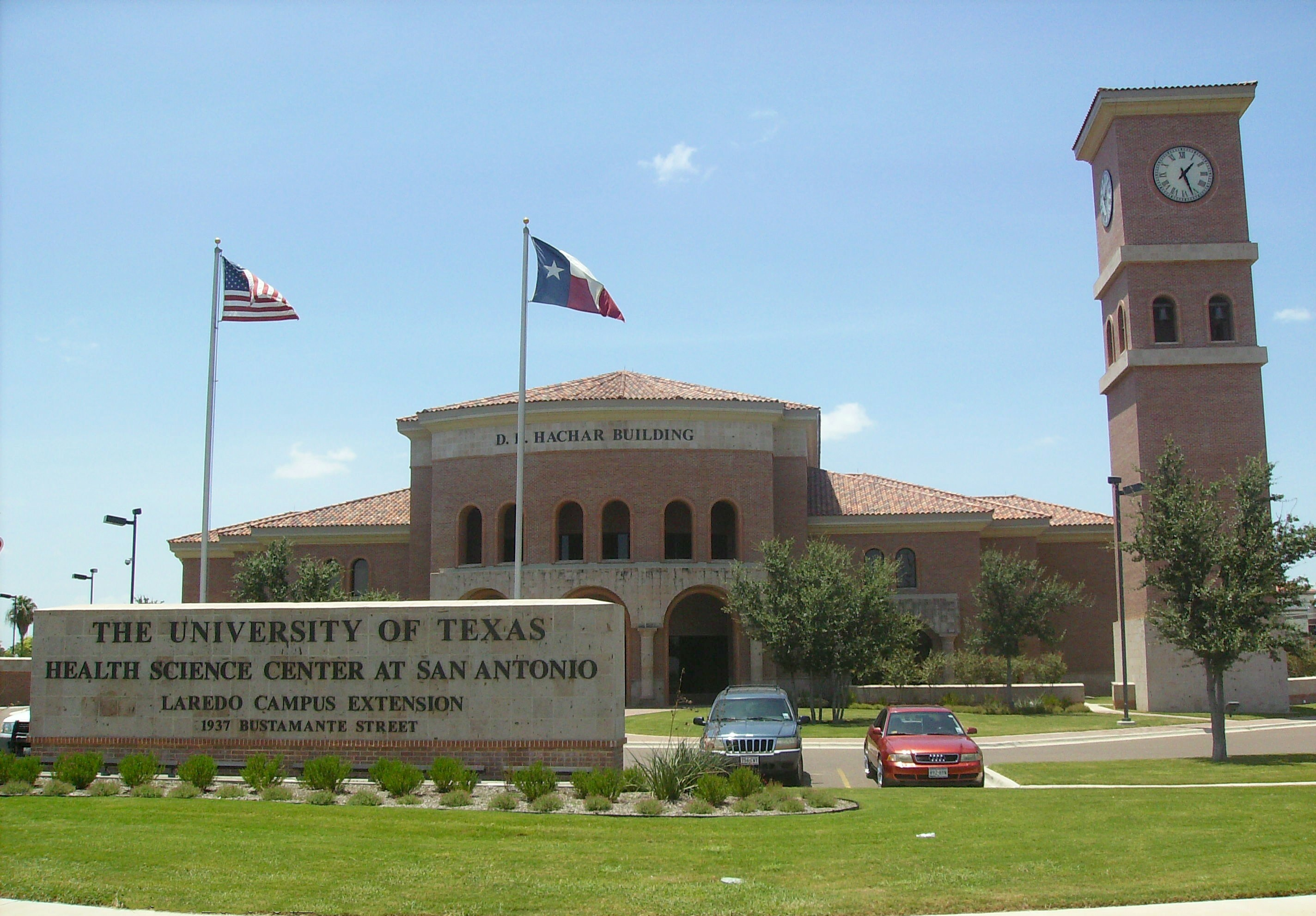
UTHSCSA campus in Laredo, Texas

The campus has a postmodern architecture, with several notable architects contributing to the design of the campus buildings, namely:

- Rafael Vinoly: South Texas Research Facility
- HKS, Inc.: The Administration Building
- Overland Partners Architects: The Barshop Institute, and the downtown University Hospital expansion project.
- FKP Architects: Medical Arts and Research Center (MARC)
- Perkins + Will: The new annex of the University Hospital.
- Kell Muñoz Architects: Dolph Briscoe Jr. Library

== Teaching hospitals and clinics ==
- University Hospital (ranked as one of the Top 50 hospitals in the US for seven years in a row, in 2007)
- The Center for Oral Health Care & Research (COHR)
- UT Health San Antonio Multispecialty and Research Hospital
- Audie L. Murphy Memorial VA Hospital
- Christus Santa Rosa medical center
- San Antonio State Hospital
- Brooke Army Medical Center (Fort Sam Houston)
- Wilford Hall Medical Center (USAF)
- Faculty Practice Plan: UT Health Physicians

== Rankings and research ==
=== Rankings ===
- The university was 51st in the world in the Academic Ranking of World Universities 2011 clinical medicine rankings.
- The University of Texas Health Science Center at San Antonio selected to Forbes Best-In-State Employers 2021 list.

=== Research ===
- CTRC is one of four National Cancer Institute (NCI)-designated cancer centers in the state of Texas.
- The liver transplant program is ranked 9th largest and most successful in the nation.
- Named a National Center of Excellence in Women's Health, by the U.S. Secretary of Health & Human Services
- Selected as National Institute of Aging-designated Alzheimer’s Disease Research Center (ADRC).
- Developed the UT Diabetic Wound Classification and ranked 20th in the world for diabetic foot research.

== Schools ==
There are six schools that offer undergraduate, graduate, and professional degrees as well as certifications both initial and post professional.

- School of Dentistry: Community Dentistry, Comprehensive Dentistry, Dental Diagnostic Science, Endodontics, General Dentistry, Oral and Maxillofacial Surgery, Orthodontics, Pediatric Dentistry, Periodontics, Prosthodontics, Restorative Dentistry.
- Graduate School of Biomedical Sciences: Biochemistry, Biomedical Engineering, Cellular and Structural Biology, Clinical Investigation, Clinical Lab Sciences, dental Hygiene, Dentistry, Microbiology and Immunology, Molecular Medicine, Pathology, Pharmacology, Pharmacy, Nursing, Physiology, Radiological Sciences.
- Joe R. and Teresa Lozano Long School of Medicine: Anesthesiology, Emergency Medicine, Family and Community Medicine, Medicine, Obstetrics and Gynecology, Ophthalmology, Orthopaedics, Pediatrics, Psychiatry, Radiation Oncology, Rehabilitation Medicine, Surgery, Urology.
- School of Health Professions: Clinical Laboratory Sciences, Dental Hygiene, Dental Laboratory Sciences, Dietetics, Emergency Health Sciences, Occupational Therapy, Physician Assistant Studies, Physical Therapy, Respiratory Care, Speech-Language Pathology.
- School of Nursing: Undergraduate professional nursing (Bachelor of Science in Nursing both traditional and accelerated-second degree), graduate nursing (Master of Science in Nurse Education, Doctor of Nursing Practice in Advanced Practice nursing specialties including Family Nurse Practitioner, Adult-Gerontology Acute Care Nurse Practitioner, Primary Care Pediatric Nurse Practitioner, Psychiatric-Mental Health Nurse Practitioner, and Nurse Anesthesia. Doctor of Nursing Practice in Advanced Practice Leadership and Executive Administrative Management. Doctor of Philosophy in Nursing Science in collaboration with the GSBS.)
- School of Public Health

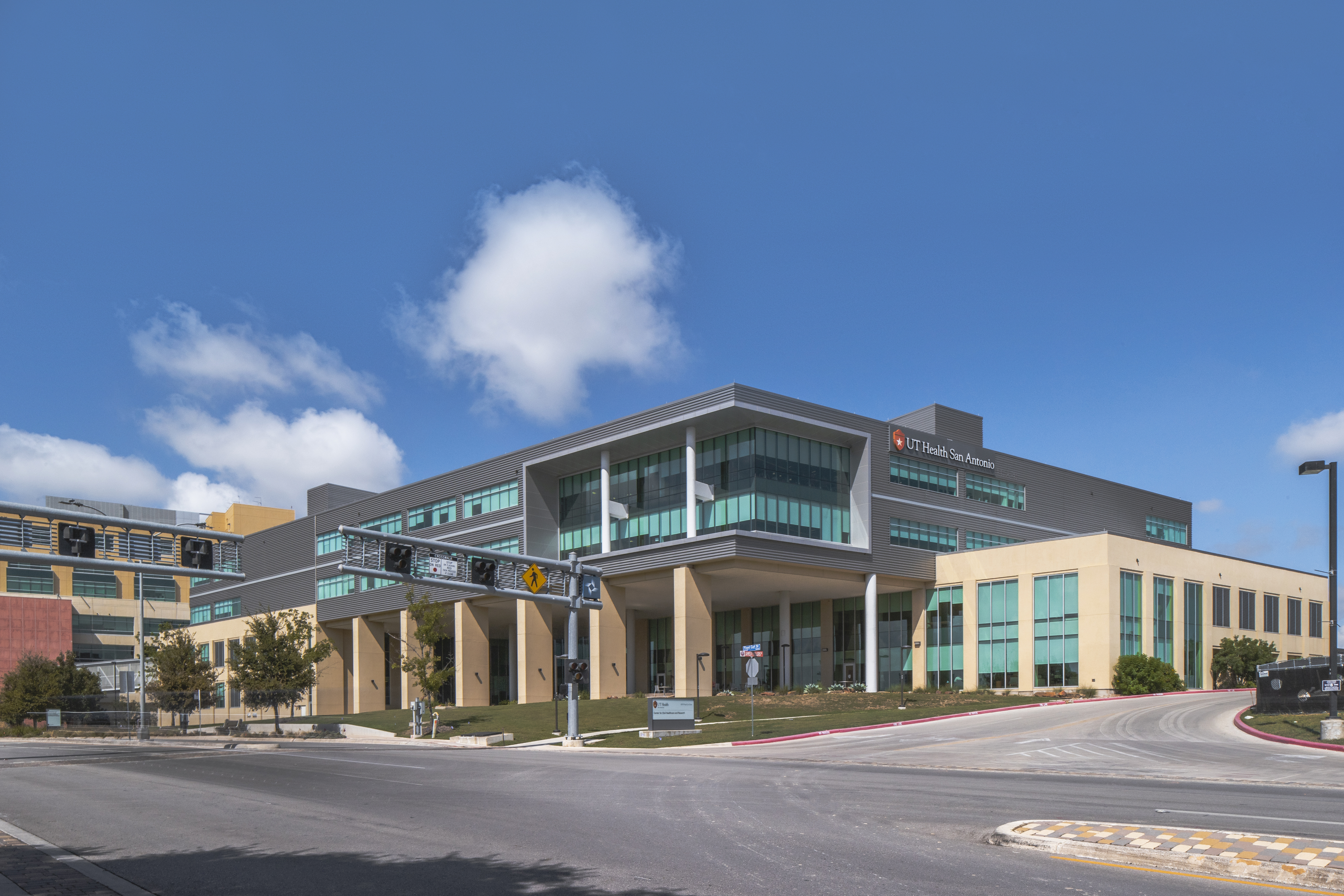
Center for Oral Health Care & Research (COHR)

- College of Pharmacy (affiliated with University of Texas at Austin)

== Centers and institutes ==
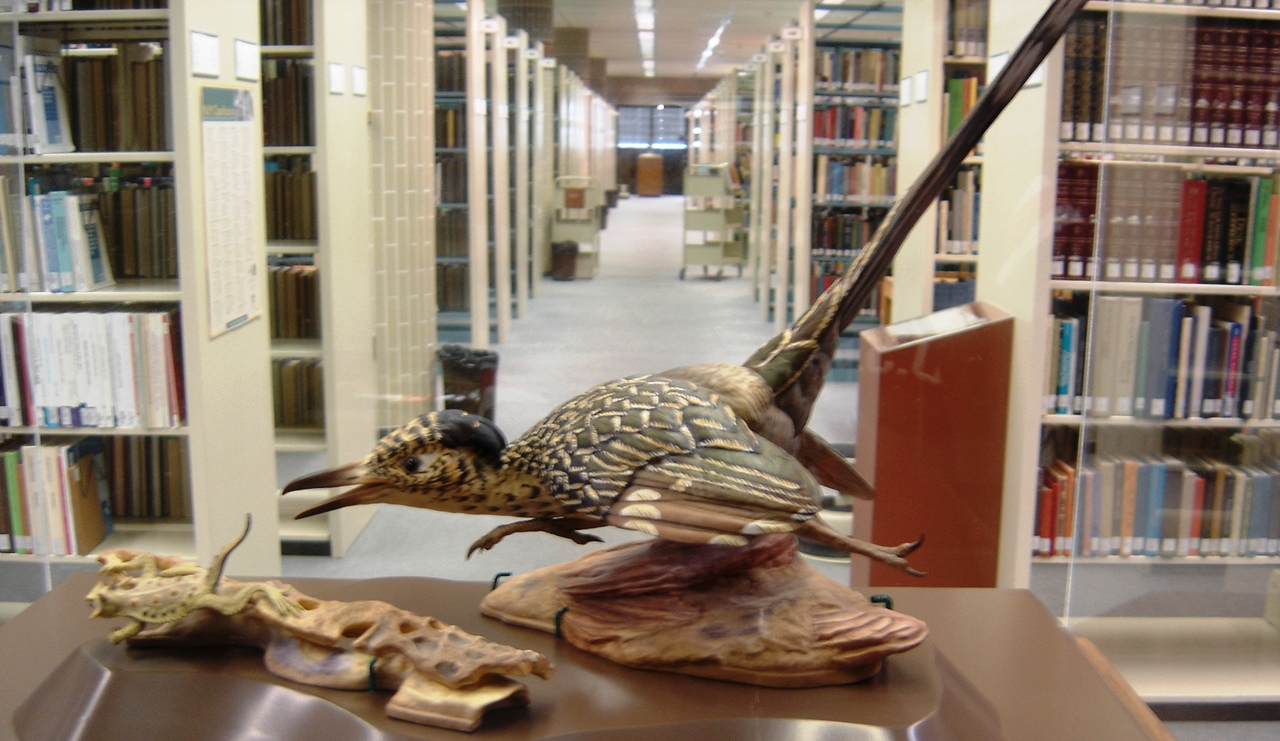
The Dolph Briscoe Jr. Library is the central library of the main campus.

- Addiction Research Treatment and Training Center of Excellence
- Academic Center for Evidence-Based Practice
- Aging Research and Education Center
- Be Well Texas
- Biomolecular Structure Analysis
- Center for Analytical Ultracentrifugation of Macromolecular Assemblies
- Center for Biomedical Neuroscience
- Center for Biomolecular NMR Spectroscopy
- Center for Integrative Health
- Center for Medical Humanities and Ethics
- Center for Neurosurgical Sciences
- Center for Oral Health Care & Research
- Center for Surface Plasmon Resonance
- Children's Cancer Research Institute
- Comparative Mouse Genomics Center
- Cancer Therapy & Research Center
- Geriatric Research, Education and Clinical Center
- Hemophilia Treatment Center
- Institute of Biotechnology
- Institutional Flow Cytometry Core Facility
- Lions Sight Research Foundation
- Nathan Shock Center of Excellence in the Basic Biology of Aging
- Regional Center for Health Workforce Studies at CHEP
- Research Imaging Center
- Sam and Ann Barshop Institute for Longevity and Aging Studies
- San Antonio Cancer Institute
- South Texas AIDS Center for Children and Their Families
- South Texas Environmental Education and Research Center
- South Texas Fertility Center
- South Texas Health Research Center
- South Texas Poison Center
- South Texas Women's Health Center
- Southwest Research Consortium
- Texas Center for the Study of Children With Special Health Care Needs
- Texas Diabetes Institute
- Wellness 360

== Notable alumni ==
- Kyle Altman (born 1986) - ex-professional soccer player, orthopedist
- Sharon Bannister - dentist, director of medical ops in the Office of the Surgeon General of the United States Air Force
- Heidi Chumley - physician, academic, dean of Ross University School of Medicine
- Ivan Edwards - flight surgeon, community activist, humanitarian
- Lawrence B. Harkless - podiatrist, academic, retired department head
- Mariannette Miller-Meeks (born 1955) - physician, politician
- Anita Thigpen Perry (born 1952) - nurse, ex-First Lady of Texas (longest serving)
- George M. Rapier III - physician executive, entrepreneur
- Susan Weintraub - scientist, academic, director of mass spectrometry

== See also ==
- University of Texas System
- San Antonio
- South Texas Medical Center
- The University of Texas at San Antonio
