= KCOR =

KCOR may refer to:

- KCOR-CD, a low-power television station (channel 27, virtual 34) licensed to serve San Antonio, Texas, United States
- KXTN (AM), a radio station (1350 AM) licensed to serve San Antonio, Texas, which held the call sign KCOR from 1946 to 2014 and from 2015 to 2019
- KMYO, a radio station (95.1 FM) licensed to serve Comfort, Texas, United States, which held the call sign KCOR-FM from 2000 to 2008 and from 2014 to 2015
- KWEX-DT, a television station (channel 41) licensed to serve San Antonio, Texas, which formerly used the call sign KCOR-TV
