= KXTN =

KXTN may refer to:

- KXTN (AM), a radio station (1350 AM) licensed to serve San Antonio, Texas, United States
- KVBH, a radio station (107.5 FM) licensed to serve San Antonio, Texas, which held the call sign KXTN from 1991 to 2019
