= KBBT =

Coordinates: 29.524°N 98.724°W

Schertz, Texas; United States
- Broadcast area: San Antonio, Texas
- Frequency: 98.5 MHz (HD Radio)
- Branding: 98.5 The Beat

Programming
- Language: English
- Format: Rhythmic contemporary
- Subchannels: HD2: Spanish CHR "Latino Mix"

Ownership
- Owner: Uforia Audio Network; (Univision Radio Illinois, Inc.)
- Sister stations: Radio: KMYO, KROM, KVBH; TV: KWEX-DT, KNIC-DT

History
- First air date: February 1, 1976
- Former call signs: KBOP-FM (1977–1993); KBUC (1993–2000)
- Former frequencies: 98.3 MHz (1968–2000)
- Call sign meaning: "Beat"

Technical information
- Facility ID: 3075
- Class: C1
- ERP: 97,000 watts
- HAAT: 302 m (991 ft)

Links
- Webcast: Listen Live
- Website: KBBT Online

KBBT (98.5 FM, "98.5 The Beat") is a rhythmic contemporary radio station serving the San Antonio, Texas area, but is licensed to Schertz. This station is owned by Uforia Audio Network under licensee Univision Radio Illinois, Inc. The station's studios are located in Northwest San Antonio and the transmitter site located in the unincorporated Bexar County near Government Canyon Park.

== Station history ==
KBBT originally launched as country outlet KBOP-FM at 98.3 and licensed to Pleasanton, Texas, on February 1, 1976. They later changed call letters to KBUC in 1993 but kept the Country format intact. In 1998 Univision, seeking to tap into a unique Hispanic audience that was non-Spanish speaking, very contemporary and influenced by present-day trends, acquired KBUC and applied for a city of license change to Schertz and a frequency switch to 98.5 to cover the San Antonio Metropolitan area, which was approved in early April 2000.

On September 29, 2000, Univision officially launched KBBT, the company's first non-Spanish formatted outlet in San Antonio (outside of bilingual-speaking Tejano sister station KXTN-FM and later on, Active Rock turned Top 40 KLTO), where it shot up to number one in the ratings and has retained that position since its inception. From the beginning, KBBT's musical formula, which started under its first program director J. D. Gonzalez, has centered on Hip-Hop/R&B hits, tailor-made for San Antonio, and in particular its large mix of teens, females, young adults, and bilingual Hispanic audiences. This formula has also served as the catalyst for the demise of the first KTFM, and later on, KCJZ/KPWT. Another defunct station, KSJL-FM, played hip-hop and R&B under the urban contemporary format throughout the 1990s until it switched frequencies in 1998 and took a more adult direction as KSJL-AM.

In 2010, KBBT phased in Rhythmic pop tracks, but at the same time continued to stick to its hip-hop/R&B formula as it faces competition from Top 40/CHR rivals KXXM and a new version of KTFM. It also embraced EDM as well, launching a weekly program that aired late Saturday nights/Sunday mornings.

=== Morning shows ===
Before 2002, KBBT had a morning show involving Danny B, Rude Dogg and others. In 2002, KBBT launched The Morning Mess, hosted by Xavier 'The Freakin' Rican' Garcia, Castro and Biggie Paul. The show was renamed to Xavier's World around 2008.

On October 20, 2015, Xavier's World Morning Show was taken off the air due to corporate-wide budget cuts, ending their 13-year run. On November 9, 2015, a new morning show debuted on KBBT titled The Dana Cortez Show, hosted by Dana Cortez and Anthony A. On August 20, 2018, the show moved to rival KTFM; on August 23, KBBT became the San Antonio affiliate of the syndicated Breakfast Club. The show would be dropped on August 3, 2020; after a period of mornings running jockless, KBBT added Wake Up with Rico & Carmen, hosted by Raul 'Rico' Colindres and his alter-ego Carmen (the voice behind the syndicated feature "Carmen's Calls"), in January 2021. The show was dropped in September 2021; in January 2022, The Dana Cortez Show returned to mornings.

== Morning Shows on KBBT ==
- Danny B and others in the morning, (2000–2002)
- The Morning Mess, later renamed to The Xavier's World Morning Show (2002–2015) (moved to KVBH)
- The Dana Cortez Show (2015–2018) (moved to KTFM)
- The Breakfast Club (2018–2020)
- Wake Up with Rico & Carmen (2021–2022)
- The Dana Cortez Show (2022–present)

== Current On-Air Staff ==
- The Dana Cortez Show (On-Air 5am-10am) (Dana Cortez Show)
- Hamm "Dj Hammburger" (Content Director & Music Director / DJ On-Air 3pm-7pm)
- Dj Ultrasonic (7pm-12am DJ)

== Former On-Air Staff ==
- Danny B
- Xavier Castro (now at KVBH)
- Biggie Paul
- Rude Dogg
- Lady K
- Romeo (Tejano Nation)
- Dionna in La Manana
- Valencia
- Robbie Rob (now at KVBH)
- Anthony Almanzar (now at KTFM)
- Brandi Garcia
- DJ Ocean

== KBBT-HD2 ==
In 2008, KBBT-HD2 simulcasted KLTO-FM (now KZAR) broadcasting an active rock format on 97.7.

In early 2011, KLTO changed the format to a Top 40/Dance station, branded as "Party 97.7". This would last until KZAR was sold in the latter half of 2011, then KBBT-HD2 went dark. As of May 2023, the HD signal for KBBT-HD1 returned to air and KBBT-HD2 now offers Latino Mix, a latin hits station.
