= KROM =

Regional Mexican radio station in San Antonio

- San Antonio, Texas; United States
- Broadcast area: Greater San Antonio
- Frequency: 92.9 MHz (HD Radio)
- Branding: Qué Buena 92.9

Programming
- Language: Spanish
- Format: Regional Mexican
- Subchannels: HD2: Spanish CHR "Latino Mix"; HD3: Regional Mexican "La Pantera 102.3"

Ownership
- Owner: Uforia Audio Network; (Tichenor License Corporation)
- Sister stations: Radio: KMYO, KBBT, KVBH; TV: KWEX-DT, KNIC-DT

History
- First air date: 1947 (as KITY)
- Former call signs: KONO-FM (1947–1960); KITY (1960–1990); KSRR-FM (1990–1993)
- Call sign meaning: Romántica (previous format)

Technical information
- Licensing authority: FCC
- Facility ID: 67071
- Class: C1
- ERP: 45,000 watts
- HAAT: 412 m (1,352 ft)
- Transmitter coordinates: 29°16′29.00″N 98°15′52.00″W
- Translator: HD3: 102.3 K272EK (San Antonio)

Links
- Public license information: Public file; LMS
- Webcast: Listen Live
- Website: Que Buena

KROM (92.9 FM) is a regional Mexican radio station in San Antonio, Texas. It is owned by Univision Radio. Its studios are located in Northwest San Antonio, and the transmitter site is in Elmendorf, Texas.

== History ==
This station began broadcasting as KONO-FM, the FM adjunct to KONO, in 1948. It broadcast a "good music" format that at one time aired in the evenings only and was sustaining with no commercials. On August 16, 1956, Mission Broadcasting, owner of the KONO stations, took KONO-FM off the air; it returned to the air in May 1957, now sharing a tower with KONO-TV (channel 12). In June 1960, the station changed call signs to KITY (pronounced "kitty") and began offering a longer broadcast day of programs.

Mission sold KONO and KITY in 1986 to Duffy Broadcasting. By this time, KITY aired a contemporary hit radio format. The station was renamed Power 93 under Duffy and introduced a morning zoo–type morning show, the Power 93 Morning Zoo, co-hosted by Elvis Duran (then styled "Lvis"). Duran hosted the program for seven months before leaving the station. KONO and KITY were included in a 1987 leveraged buyout of Duffy by Martin Greenberg, forming Genesis Broadcasting Corporation.

On September 6, 1990, KITY returned to adult contemporary as KSRR "Star 93". At the time, it was owned by Booth American's West Coast division, Genesis Broadcasting; when all of Booth's Texas stations were divested when Booth merged with Broadcast Alchemy to form Secret Communications, Tichenor Media bought KSRR for $3.8 million. Tichenor, a specialist in Hispanic broadcasting, relaunched KSRR as Spanish AC outlet "Éxitos en Español, KSRR FM 92.9" on March 27, 1993; later that year, it flipped completely to romantic as La Romántica with new KROM call letters.

In 1995, KROM flipped to Regional Mexican as Estéreo Latino. The Tichenor stations (including KROM) were sold to Univision in 2003. The station rebranded as Qué Buena on March 28, 2016 as part of brand changes at Univision's Regional Mexican stations.
