= KCOR-CD =

Television station in San Antonio

Translator of KNIC-DT, Blanco–San Antonio, Texas
- San Antonio, Texas; United States
- Channels: Digital: 27 (UHF); Virtual: 34

Programming
- Affiliations: 34.1: UniMás; 34.2: Univision; for others, see § Subchannels

Ownership
- Owner: TelevisaUnivision; (UniMas Partnership of San Antonio)

History
- Founded: March 23, 1988
- First air date: March 1991
- Former call signs: K17BY (1988–1997); KNIC-LP (1997–2001); KNIC-CA (2001–2015); KNIC-CD (2015–2019)
- Former channel numbers: Analog: 17 (UHF, 1991–2012), 34 (UHF, 2012–2015); Digital: 34 (UHF, 2015–2019)
- Call sign meaning: former call sign of KXTN and KWEX-DT, which were founded by Raoul A. Cortez

Technical information
- Licensing authority: FCC
- Facility ID: 48837
- ERP: 15 kW
- HAAT: 148.4 m (487 ft)
- Transmitter coordinates: 29°25′6″N 98°29′32″W

Links
- Public license information: Public file; LMS

KCOR-CD (channel 34) is a low-power, Class A television station in San Antonio, Texas, United States. It is a translator of Blanco-licensed UniMás station KNIC-DT (channel 17) which is owned and operated by TelevisaUnivision; it is also sister to San Antonio–licensed Univision outlet KWEX-DT (channel 41). KCOR-CD's transmitter is located on César E. Chavéz Bouelvard in downtown San Antonio; its parent station shares studios with KWEX-DT on Network Boulevard on the city's northwest side.

== History ==
The station began as a construction permit issued to Clear Channel Communications on March 23, 1988, to build a low-power television station on UHF channel 17 in San Antonio. Given the callsign K17BY, the station went on air in March 1991 and was licensed a month later on April 2, 1991. Also in March 1991, Clear Channel agreed to sell the station to Nicolas Communications, who assumed full control several weeks later. In November 1997, the station took call letters KNIC-LP, named after its owners, and in November 2001, the station upgraded to a Class A license, changing its call letters to KNIC-CA. Also in November, Nicolas Communications and Univision reached an agreement for Univision to buy the station, and the transaction was consummated in January 2002, in time for the launch of Univision's new network, Telefutura. KNIC-CA affiliated with the new network and simulcast its programming on KFTO-LP (now KFTO-CA).

Univision had been an applicant since 2000 for a full-service television station on UHF channel 52 in Blanco, and after winning the auction to build the station, they requested that the FCC change the allocation from channel 52 to channel 17. The FCC granted the request, to be effective in February 2003. In their formal application to build the full-service station, to be called KNIC-TV, Univision declared their intent to either move KNIC-CA to another channel, or to shut it down altogether. In September 2006, with KNIC-TV about to go on-the-air, Univision requested an STA to move KNIC-CA to channel 34. The FCC granted the STA, and KNIC-CA channel 17 went silent on September 28, 2006.

In moving to channel 34, KNIC-CA disrupted plans for digital operations for three other local television stations: KMHZ-LP, KVDF-CA and KEVI-LP. The stations had competing applications to build a low-power digital television facilities on channel 34, but Class A displacements have priority over other low-power applications not caused by displacement. A displacement occurs when a higher-priority station forces a lower-priority station to change its broadcast channel. Full-service KNIC-TV had priority over Class A low-power KNIC-CA, so KNIC-CA was displaced.

The station was licensed for digital operation on channel 34 on June 3, 2015, and changed its call sign to KNIC-CD.

The station changed its call sign to KCOR-CD on April 5, 2019.

== Technical information ==
=== Subchannels ===
Subchannels of KNIC-DT and KCOR-CD
Subchannel		Res.	Short name	Programming
KNIC-DT	KCOR-CD	Res.	Short name	Programming
17.1	34.1	720p	KNIC-DT	UniMás
17.2	34.2	720p	KWEX-DT	Univision (KWEX-DT)
17.3	34.3	480i	MVSGLD	MovieSphere Gold
17.4	34.4	480i	BT2	Infomercials
17.5	34.5	480i	SHOP LC	Shop LC
12.5		480i	StartTV	Start TV (KSAT-TV)

Simulcast of subchannels of another station
Subchannel broadcast with MPEG-4 video
Broadcast on behalf of another station

=== Analog-to-digital conversion ===
KNIC-CA was allowed to continue broadcasting its analog signal following June 12, 2009, which was the end of the digital TV conversion period for full-service stations, since it is a licensed low-power Class A station and has certain interference protection rights.

After the 2016–2017 FCC TV spectrum auction, KNIC-CD moved from RF channel 34 to RF channel 27 for testing in April 2019. The switch was completed in June 2019.
