= KNIC-DT =

Television station in Blanco, Texas

- Blanco–San Antonio, Texas; United States
- City: Blanco, Texas
- Channels: Digital: 18 (UHF); Virtual: 17
- Branding: UniMás 17

Programming
- Affiliations: 17.1: UniMás; 17.2: Univision; for others, see § Subchannels

Ownership
- Owner: TelevisaUnivision; (UniMas Partnership San Antonio)
- Sister stations: TV: KWEX-DT; Radio: KBBT, KMYO, KROM, KVBH

History
- Founded: July 13, 2005
- First air date: September 28, 2006
- Former call signs: KNIC-TV (2006–2009)
- Former channel number: Analog: 17 (UHF, 2006–2009)
- Call sign meaning: Nicolas Communications (former owner of former station on channel 17, KNIC-CD)

Technical information
- Licensing authority: FCC
- Facility ID: 125710
- ERP: 1,000 kW
- HAAT: 200 m (656 ft)
- Transmitter coordinates: 29°41′48″N 98°30′45″W
- Translator(s): KCOR-CD 34 San Antonio

Links
- Public license information: Public file; LMS
- Website: UniMás

KNIC-DT (channel 17) is a television station licensed to Blanco, Texas, United States, broadcasting the Spanish-language UniMás network to the San Antonio area. It is owned and operated by TelevisaUnivision alongside Univision outlet KWEX-DT (channel 41). The two stations share studios at the Univision Broadcast Center on Network Boulevard in Northwest San Antonio; KNIC's transmitter is located on Hogan Drive in Timberwood Park. Although Blanco is geographically within the Austin market, that city has its own UniMás station, KTFO-CD.

== History ==
KNIC-DT's history traces back to the March 1991 sign-on of K17BY, a low-power television station that San Antonio-based Clear Channel Communications (now iHeartMedia) was issued a construction permit to build on March 23, 1988; operating on UHF channel 17, Clear Channel sold the station in March 1991 to Nicolas Communications. In November 1997, the station changed its calls to KNIC-LP (in reference to its owners); Nicolas Communications sold KNIC-CA in November 2001 (the station received approval to upgrade its license to Class A status that same month) to Univision Communications, a sale that was completed in January 2002; that month, it became a charter affiliate of Univision's secondary network, TeleFutura (which relaunched as UniMás on January 7, 2013).

Univision had applied for a license to build a full-power television station in 2000 on UHF channel 52 in Blanco; after the Federal Communications Commission awarded Univision the license at auction, Univision requested that the FCC move the allocation to UHF channel 17; the request was granted in February 2003. KNIC-TV was founded on July 13, 2005. The formal application for KNIC-TV called for Univision to either move KNIC-CA to another channel, or to shut it down outright, KNIC-CA moved to channel 34 under special temporary authorization, before it ceased operations on September 28, 2006; its license survives as KCOR-CD, a translator of KNIC-DT. KNIC-DT was one of the few television stations to have been built and signed on by Univision Communications.

== Technical information ==
=== Subchannels ===
Subchannels of KNIC-DT and KCOR-CD
Subchannel		Res.	Short name	Programming
KNIC-DT	KCOR-CD	Res.	Short name	Programming
17.1	34.1	720p	KNIC-DT	UniMás
17.2	34.2	720p	KWEX-DT	Univision (KWEX-DT)
17.3	34.3	480i	MVSGLD	MovieSphere Gold
17.4	34.4	480i	BT2	Infomercials
17.5	34.5	480i	SHOP LC	Shop LC
12.5		480i	StartTV	Start TV (KSAT-TV)

Simulcast of subchannels of another station
Subchannel broadcast with MPEG-4 video
Broadcast on behalf of another station

=== Analog-to-digital conversion ===
Because it was granted an original construction permit after the FCC finalized the DTV allotment plan on April 21, 1997 , the station did not receive a companion channel for a digital television station. KNIC-TV ended regular programming on its analog signal, over UHF channel 17, on June 12, 2009. The station "flash-cut" its digital signal into operation UHF channel 18, using virtual channel 17.
