= SICC =

SICC may refer to:

- Sabah International Convention Centre, a convention center in Sabah, Malaysia
- Singapore International Commercial Court
- Supreme Islamic Courts Council, the former name of Islamic Courts Union in Somalia
- Spanish International Communications Corporation, an American media company co-founded by Emilio Nicolas Sr.
