= Raoul A. Cortez =

Mexican media executive (1905–1971)

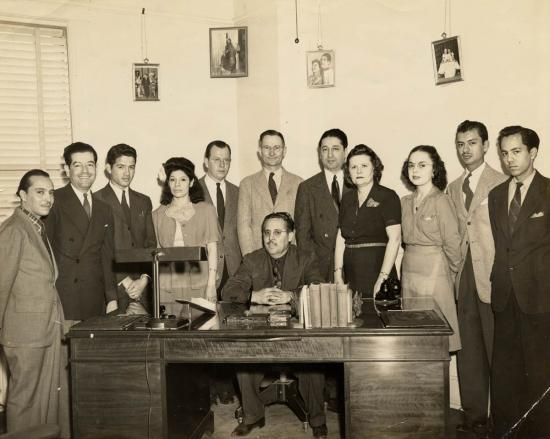
- Raoul A. Cortez (center, seated) and KCOR staff c. 1940
- Born: October 17, 1905; Jalapa, Veracruz, Mexico
- Died: December 17, 1971 (aged 66); San Antonio, Texas, United States
- Occupation(s): Spanish-language radio and television station owner and developer
- Known for: Founding KCOR AM and KCOR-TV stations, Latino rights activism

Raoul Alfonso Cortez Camarillo (October 17, 1905 – December 17, 1971) was a Mexican media executive, best remembered for founding KCOR, the first full-time Spanish-language radio station in the contiguous United States, in 1946. The station WKAQ was founded earlier in 1922 in Puerto Rico and owned by Angel Ramos.

== Life and career ==
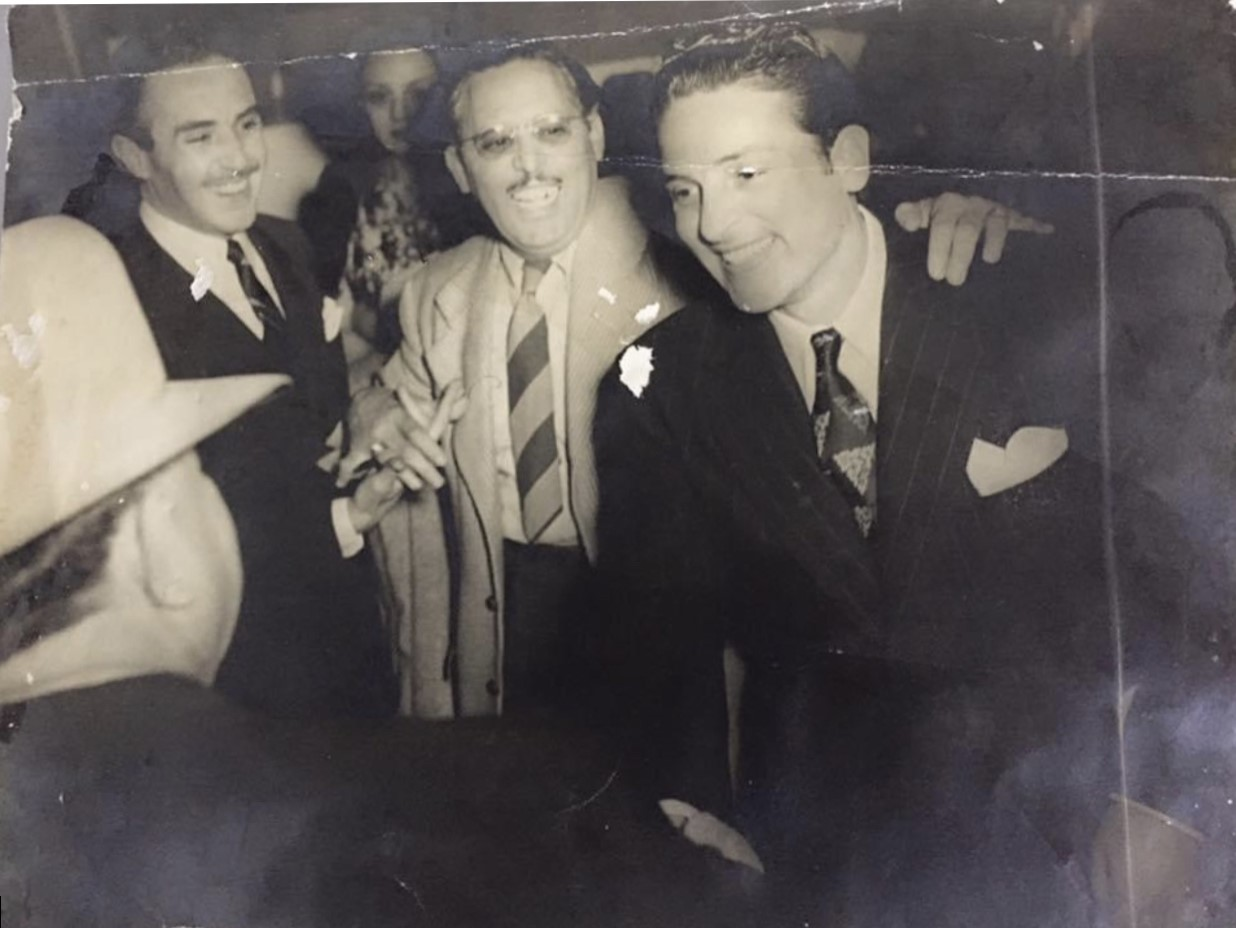
Raoul with Mexican movie star Arturo de Cordova and Argentinian-born Mexican movie star Jorge "Ché" Reyes

Raoul A. Cortez was born in 1905 in Xalapa, Veracruz, Mexico, one of nine siblings. His father owned a radio station in Nuevo Laredo, Tamaulipas, Mexico. As a young man, Cortez sold eggs on the streets to earn money for airtime on local radio stations, where he would produce a variety of hours in which he sold advertising. In the 1910s, the family emigrated to the United States, soon after the start of the Mexican Revolution. Cortez eventually settled in San Antonio, Texas, where he took on a number of different jobs, such as dressing windows for Penner's men's store and working as a sales representative for Pearl Brewery. He got his start in media working as a reporter for La Prensa, a San Antonio–based Spanish-language daily newspaper. His aim was to earn money to buy air time on a local radio station KMAC and once more produce his own Spanish language variety hour and sell the advertising time for his shows.

Cortez soon came to the conclusion that a new, full-time Spanish-language radio station was needed. He wanted to be able to broadcast Spanish-language programming all day, every day and night. However, during World War II, the U.S. Federal Communications Commission (FCC) had suspended the attribution of broadcasting licenses for new radio or TV stations, out of fear that non-English programming could be spreading anti-American propaganda. Once the war was over, the FCC was able to give out licenses again, and Cortez was among the first in line. In 1944, Cortez applied for a license to open his own radio station. To get around wartime restrictions on foreign language media, he stated that part of the station's purpose was to mobilize the Mexican-American community behind the war effort. The license was granted to him, and he eventually opened KCOR 1350 AM in San Antonio in 1946, the first all Spanish-language radio station owned and operated by a Hispanic, using the signature line "La Voz Mexicana, the Voice of Mexican Americans."

In 1947, Cortes requested the FCC to permit KCOR to change "from 1350 kc, 1 kw power, daytime only, to 1350 kc, 5 kw power, unlimited time, employing a directional antenna day and night, to install a new transmitter and change transmitter location." At the same time, the FCC also authorized a conditional grant for an FM Class B station.

Then, as now, full-power radio stations east of the Mississippi River have to start their 4-letter callsigns with 'W', and stations west of the Mississippi with 'K'. The following three letters came from Cortez's surname, making KCOR. Being on an AM frequency meant the station had a wide reach. Cortez brought in talent from Mexico and South Texas to play live music on the air. Programming also focused on sharing the Mexican community's challenges and triumphs, through call-in shows and advice programs. Cortez also formed the "Sombrero" radio network, a chain of stations across the USA that combined forces to improve and promote radio broadcasts. In 1953, Cortez brought in Manuel Bernal, a popular Mexican radio professional and a skilled musician and writer, to produce commercials and musical programs for the station. Bernal also composed numerous radio jingles. The radio station has remained on the air ever since. Today the station still broadcasts in Spanish only, under the same call letters, on the 1350 AM frequency, with programming from Univisión Radio.

An example of the positive contributions that KCOR made towards the promotion of Latino and Black artists locally was the case of Albert "Scratch" Phillips, one of the first black disc jockeys in San Antonio. Phillips was hired by KCOR in May 1951 to host a nightly two-hour rhythm and blues show. The show was destined to have a lasting and deep impact on the local music scene. Scratch Phillips was later credited by many artists for exposing them to the type of music that would inspire them to become musicians. He gave support to both local African-American and Chicano R&B groups and is recognized for introducing Soul Music to San Antonians a decade later.

Two years later, in 1955, after many years of lobbying, Cortez launched KCOR-TV Channel 41, broadcast on the new Ultra-High Frequency (UHF) band. This was the first television station aimed solely at a Hispanic audience in the continental U.S. and the first to broadcast on UHF. Initially, due to budget restrictions, programs were aired only in the evening, from 7:00 to 10:00, but slowly but surely, Cortez found sponsors who saw the value of advertising to the Hispanic community, and the station reached all-day broadcasting, offering a variety of daytime shows. Programs such as Teatro KCOR and Teatro Motorola, were written, directed, and performed by popular Tejano actor Lalo Astol, who also had been involved in KCOR radio productions. Besides locally-produced programming, the station aired movies and Variety shows from Mexico or ones featuring well-known Mexican actors. The station also offered community shows that answered common questions, like how to obtain a Social Security number or even assisting community members in finding a job.

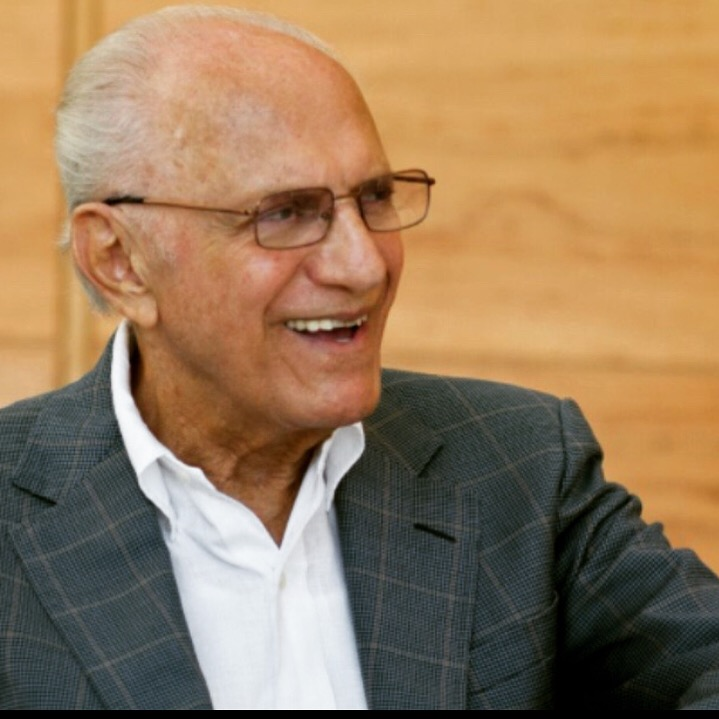
Emilio Nicolas Sr.

Emilio Nicolas Sr., Cortez's son-in-law, was heavily involved from the start, in both running the station and soliciting advertising. Recruiting advertisers was not easy in those early days because most television sets were not equipped to receive UHF. Receiving UHF channels required a converter box, quite an expensive thing at that time (about $150 in today's money), so Cortez had to work hard to encourage people to buy a converter to watch his channel. Despite vigorous efforts to attract more advertisers, in 1961, the financial challenges associated with being a UHF station eventually incited Cortez to sell KCOR-TV to a group of investors, including Emilio Nicolas, Sr. and Mexican media tycoon Emilio Azcárraga Vidaurreta. Under this new leadership, the station's call letters were changed to KWEX-TV.

Cortez served in various leadership roles with the League of United Latin American Citizens (LULAC), a leading national organization that fought for the civil rights of Mexican Americans. He served as director for District 15, which included San Antonio, and led the organization for two consecutive terms as president in 1948 and 1949, during which he oversaw the Delgado v. Bastrop Independent School District case, marking the end of segregation against Mexican Americans in Texas public schools. Cortez was active in helping the wider community of citizens in South Texas, including raising funds to help victims of the 1954 floods in the Rio Grande Valley. He also worked with Mexican President Miguel Aleman and U.S. President Harry S. Truman to ameliorate the plight of Black immigrant workers, through the bi-national "Bracero Program".

== Accolades ==
Cortez received numerous awards and honors for his achievements concerning Hispanic broadcasting and Latino rights in the USA. In 1981 the city of San Antonio named the Raoul A. Cortez Branch Library in recognition of his accomplishments. In 2006, the National Association of Broadcasters jointly honored Nicolas and Cortez with the NAB "Spirit of Broadcasting" award for their pioneering work in bringing Hispanic programming to America. In 2007 the professional publication Radio Ink created the Medallas de Cortez to recognize excellence in Hispanic radio broadcasting. In 2015 a new exhibit, titled American Enterprise, at the Smithsonian's National Museum of American History in Washington, D.C., featured Cortez and KCOR. On October 17, 2023, Cortez's 118th birthday, a Google Doodle was made honoring him.

== Death ==
Cortez died on December 17, 1971, in San Antonio, Texas. He was survived by his wife Genoveva Valdés Cortez, son Raoul Cortez Jr., and daughters Rosamaria Cortez (Toscano) and Irma Cortez (Nicolas).
