= KVBH =

- San Antonio, Texas; United States
- Broadcast area: Greater San Antonio
- Frequency: 107.5 MHz (HD Radio)
- Branding: Vibe 107.5

Programming
- Language: English
- Format: Rhythmic adult contemporary
- Subchannels: HD2: Tejano (Stream Tejano simulcast)

Ownership
- Owner: Uforia Audio Network; (Tichenor License Corporation)
- Sister stations: Radio: KMYO, KROM, KBBT; TV: KWEX-DT, KNIC-DT

History
- First air date: December 31, 1967
- Former call signs: KBUC-FM (1967–1988); KZVE (1988–1991); KXTN-FM (1991–2015); KMYO (2015); KXTN-FM (2015–2019); KVBH (2019–present)
- Former frequencies: 106.3 MHz (1967–1974)
- Call sign meaning: "Vibe"

Technical information
- Licensing authority: FCC
- Facility ID: 67064
- Class: C0
- ERP: 95,100 watts; (98,000 with beam tilt)
- HAAT: 434 m (1,424 ft)
- Transmitter coordinates: 29°16′29.00″N 98°15′52.00″W

Links
- Public license information: Public file; LMS
- Webcast: Listen Live
- Website: KVBH Online

KVBH (107.5 FM) is a commercial radio station in San Antonio, Texas. The station is owned by Uforia Audio Network and it airs a rhythmic adult contemporary radio format. Studios and offices are located on Network Boulevard in Northwest San Antonio. The transmitter site is in Elmendorf, on Elmendorf-Lavonia Road.

== History ==
=== KBUC-FM ===
On December 31, 1967, the station signed on as KBUC-FM. Its community of license was Terrell Hills, and it broadcast at 106.3 MHz. The power was only 3,000 watts, a fraction of its current output. KBUC-FM was the FM counterpart to AM daytimer KBUC, so programming could continue to be heard on the FM station after sunset. KBUC-AM-FM simulcasted a country music format, and were owned by Tom E. Turner and the Turner Broadcasting Corporation (which is not related to the current day Turner Broadcasting System).

In 1974, KBUC-FM moved from 106.3 to 107.5 to make way for a new station, KTUF (now KTKX at 106.7 FM). The move also included a power increase to 100,000 watts and a change in community of license to San Antonio. The new, more-powerful signal allowed KBUC-FM to be heard for many miles around the San Antonio radio market. KBUC-AM-FM continued airing country music and personality DJs, plus news from the ABC Information Network.

=== Switch to Tejano ===
In 1986, KBUC-AM-FM were bought by TK Communications. On September 2, 1988, TK changed the FM station's call sign to KZVE, becoming a Spanish-language adult contemporary station known as "K-Suave" ("K-Soft"). In addition, KBUC (AM) became KXTN, airing a Tejano music format.

In 1991, TK decided to swap the formats on the two stations, given that 1310 had significantly higher ratings than the FM counterpart, with 1310 AM becoming Spanish AC as KZVE, while 107.5 FM switched to Tejano. The AC format stayed on AM 1310 until 1997, when it began simulcasting 107.5 FM. In addition, 1310 changed its call letters to KXTN, while 107.5 simply added an "-FM" suffix, becoming KXTN-FM.

In 2003, Univision, which owns scores of radio and TV stations in some of the largest Hispanic media markets, bought KXTN-AM-FM.

=== Vibe 107.5 ===
On April 12, 2019, at 5:00 p.m., KXTN-FM dropped its longtime Tejano format and flipped to Rhythmic AC with a focus on classic hip-hop, branded as "Vibe 107.5". The first song on "Vibe" was "Return of the Mack" by Mark Morrison. The call sign was changed to KVBH on April 16, 2019. In June 2019, Xavier Castro ("the Freakin' Rican"), former longtime morning host at sister station KBBT, began hosting mornings on the station.

== KVBH-HD2 ==
KVBH broadcasts in the HD Radio format. Its HD2 subchannel carries the former Tejano format that previously aired on the main 107.5 signal and now broadcast on KXTN. KXTN and KVBH-HD2 are the Spanish-language FM flagship station for the San Antonio Spurs basketball team. During game broadcasts, KVBH-HD2 continues to air Tejano music through the Uforia app, while the digital signal carries the Spurs' play-by-play.

== KXTN-FM in other Texas cities ==
Since 2009, the station had rebroadcast on a subchannel of co-owned KDXX (previously KFZO and KESS-FM) in Lewisville via HD Radio on 107.9 HD-2. KFZO serves the Dallas-Fort Worth Metroplex. However, on June 29, 2013, with KESS-FM suddenly flipping formats on the main station from Rhythmic Top 40 to Regional Mexican as (previously on KFZO), the KXTN simulcast was replaced with the "Hot" format on 107.9-HD2 for over two weeks.

KXTN-FM programming was heard on the subchannels of these Univision-owned Texas radio stations:

Location	Callsign	Nickname	Frequency
Dallas-Ft.Worth, Texas	KFZO	Stream Tejano Dallas	107.1-HD2
Dallas-Ft.Worth, Texas	KESS-FM	Stream Tejano Dallas	107.9-HD2
Houston, Texas	KLTN	Stream Tejano Houston	102.9-HD2
Austin, Texas	KLJA	Stream Tejano Austin	107.7-HD2
