= KWEX-DT =

Television station in San Antonio

- San Antonio, Texas; United States
- Channels: Digital: 24 (UHF); Virtual: 41
- Branding: Univision 41; Noticias 41 (newscasts)

Programming
- Affiliations: 41.1: Univision; for others, see § Subchannels

Ownership
- Owner: TelevisaUnivision; (KWEX License Partnership, L.P.)
- Sister stations: TV: KNIC-DT; Radio: KBBT, KXTN, KMYO, KROM, KVBH

History
- First air date: June 10, 1955
- Former call signs: KCOR-TV (1955–1961); KUAL-TV (1961–1962); KWEX-TV (1962–2009)
- Former channel numbers: Analog: 41 (UHF, 1955–2009); Digital: 39 (UHF, 2002–2009), 41 (UHF, 2009–2019)
- Former affiliations: Spanish Independent (1955–1962)
- Call sign meaning: "WEX" = XEW backwards (the callsign KXEW was already used at the time)

Technical information
- Licensing authority: FCC
- Facility ID: 35881
- ERP: 785 kW
- HAAT: 388 m (1,273 ft)
- Transmitter coordinates: 29°16′29.8″N 98°15′53″W
- Translator(s): KNIC-DT 17.2 Blanco

Links
- Public license information: Public file; LMS
- Website: Univision 41

KWEX-DT (channel 41) is a television station in San Antonio, Texas, United States, serving as the local outlet for the Spanish-language network Univision. It is owned and operated by TelevisaUnivision alongside Blanco-licensed UniMás outlet KNIC-DT (channel 17). The two stations share studios at the Univision Broadcast Center on Network Boulevard in Northwest San Antonio; KWEX-DT operates a secondary studio facility at the Texas A&M–San Antonio Educational and Cultural Arts Center on South Santa Rosa Avenue in downtown San Antonio. The station's transmitter is located off US 181 in northwest Wilson County (northeast of Elmendorf).

== History ==
Former logo, used until December 31, 2012.

The station first signed on the air on June 10, 1955, as KCOR-TV. The call sign was taken from its radio sister station KCOR (1350 AM), which itself was named for Raoul A. Cortez, the owner and pioneer of the first full-time Spanish-language radio and television stations in the United States by the Radio Corporation of America (RCA). KCOR-TV was also the first Spanish-language commercial television station in the U.S., as well as the first television station in south Texas to broadcast on the UHF band. The station originally operated from studio facilities located on Network Boulevard (southwest of the present-day I-10) on the city's northwest side.

In 1961, after years of losses, Cortez sold the station to a consortium led by his son-in-law Emilio Nicolas, Rene Anselmo, Emilio Azcárraga Vidaurreta, Julian Kaufman and Frank Fouce. With the change in ownership, the station changed its call letters to KUAL-TV that year. Since the station's beginnings, Nicolas had worked side by side with Cortez, not only running the station, but producing many of channel 41's variety programs. Azcarraga's family owned Mexico's highest-rated television network, Telesistema Mexicano (forerunner of Televisa), allowing KUAL to gain stronger programming. Nicolas made the station a financial success, and in late 1962 Nicolas and his partners built their second television station, KMEX-TV in Los Angeles. The two stations, with KUAL as the de facto founding station of the entire network, formed the nuclei of the first Spanish language television network in the United States; later that year, the station changed its calls to KWEX-TV as the station became a charter affiliate of the Spanish International Network (which was relaunched as Univision in 1987).

On July 29, 2013, KWEX relocated from its longtime Durango Boulevard studios in San Antonio's Southtown district to a new 43,200-square-foot (4,013 m^{2}) facility on Network Boulevard. The facility, which was constructed over the course of six months, cost $10 million to build and included expanded master control and newsroom space, two studios for production of its newscasts and local programs (one of which included a kitchen set used for food segments); Univision's San Antonio radio cluster—KCOR, KBBT (98.5 FM), KCOR-FM (95.1 FM), KROM (92.9 FM), KXTN-FM (107.5)—relocated their operations to the facility in late summer 2013. Plans called for the former studio facility to be torn down with an apartment complex being built on the property, a plan that was opposed by the San Antonio Conservation Society and the Texas Historical Commission, who proposed that the building be restored and incorporated into the new development.

On August 10, 2013, KWEX signed a three-year lease agreement with Texas A&M University–San Antonio to use the university educational and cultural arts center on the site of the Museo Alameda (which closed in August 2012) in the Market Square district of downtown San Antonio as a secondary studio facility; the station built a 1,200-square-foot (111 m^{2}), HD-ready studio for use during live segments seen on the station's 5 and 10 p.m. newscasts as well as its morning news insert Despierta San Antonio, Texas A&M communications students would also have access to the studio when it was not in use for KWEX productions. The new facility opened on February 18, 2014.

== News operation ==
KWEX-DT presently broadcasts 20 hours, 55 minutes of locally produced newscasts each week (with 3 1/2 hours each weekday, one hour on Saturdays and two hours on Sundays); in addition, the station produces a series of interview segments titled Despierta San Antonio (Wake-up San Antonio), which airs at around 25 and 55 minutes past the hour during Univision's national morning program Despierta América on weekday mornings. On June 26, 2017, KWEX-DT became the first Spanish television station to launch a midday newscast, Edicion Digital San Antonio, airing weekdays at 11:30 a.m. On March 11, 2019, KWEX-DT began a morning newscast, Noticias Texas Central Primera Hora, which also aired on KAKW-DT in Austin.

== Technical information ==
=== Subchannels ===
The station's signal is multiplexed:

Subchannels of KWEX-DT
Subchannel	Res.	Short name	Programming
41.1	1080i	KWEX-DT	Univision
41.2	480i	GREAT	Great (4:3)
41.3	480i	Nosey	Nosey
41.4	480i	HSN	HSN
41.6	480i	QVC	QVC
41.7	480i	QVC-2	QVC2

Subchannel broadcast with MPEG-4 video

=== Analog-to-digital conversion ===
KWEX-TV ended regular programming on its analog signal, over UHF channel 41, on June 12, 2009, the official date on which full-power television stations in the United States transitioned from analog to digital broadcasts under federal mandate. The station's digital signal relocated from its pre-transition UHF channel 39 to channel 41.
