= Emilio Nicolas Sr. =

American businessman and media executive (1930–2019)

Emilio Nicolás Sr.
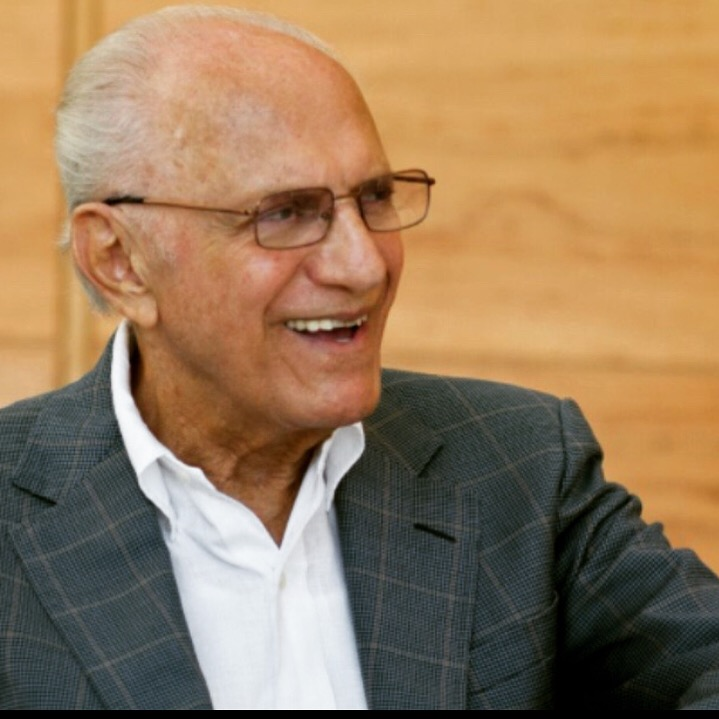
- Born: 27 October 1930; Frontera, Coahuila, Mexico
- Died: 12 October 2019 (aged 88); San Antonio, Texas, U.S.
- Education: St. Mary's University, Texas (B.S.); Trinity University (M.S.)
- Occupations: Spanish-language television station owner and network developer
- Known for: Founding KWEX-TV, SICC and Galavision, Latino rights activism
- Spouse: Irma Alicia Cortez (m. 1953)
- Children: 3

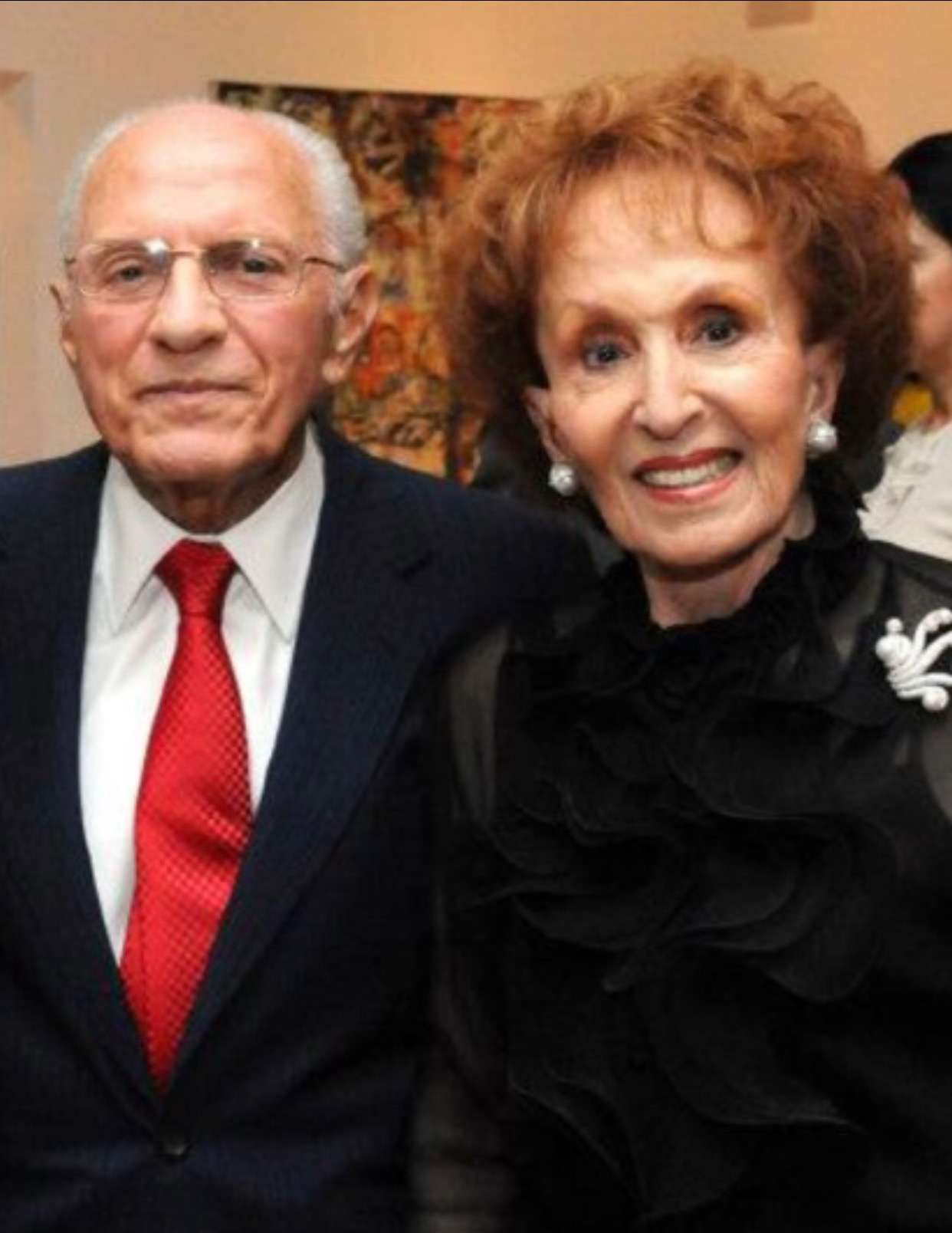
Emilio with wife Irma

Emilio Nicolás Sr. (27 October 1930 – 12 October 2019) was a Mexican media executive credited with a major role in creating and developing Spanish-language television stations and networks in the United States. After beginning his career at KCOR-AM and KCOR-TV in San Antonio, TX, Nicolás later took over the struggling TV channel and renamed it KWEX-TV, embarking on a rapid expansion and development which led to the creation of the very first US satellite interconnected television network, which was destined to become Univision.

== Life and career ==
One of five children, Emilio Rafael Nicolás was born in the mining town of Ciudad Frontera, located in northern Mexico, in the state of Coahuila, on the 27th of October, 1930 to parents Constantino and Miriam Saide Nicolás. Previously they had lived in Palestine, in the city of Bethlehem. Initially his parents owned a dry goods store there which was open all day, every day. The family later moved to Rosita where they expanded to three stores on the same block; one selling food and the others clothing. Emilio and his family lived above the stores.

Nicolás and his father would spend many hours listening to radio broadcasts together and in particular news reports from the US concerning Allied advances during WW2. After primary school, Nicolás attended a Marist Catholic boarding school for boys in San Luis Potosi. As well as French, algebra and trigonometry, he also studied international history. His father urged him to learn English too, so after graduating from high school in 1948, Nicolás emigrated north of the border to pursue his studies. Nicolás' father wanted him to attend St. Mary's University in San Antonio when he was 18 years old, but his application was refused, in spite of his academic qualifications, because his English was deemed to be insufficient. The school suggested he delay his enrollment until his language skills had improved. In the meantime he attended a US high school in order to improve his level of English. Nicolás was assiduous and would scour dictionaries to compile vocabulary lists, translating them into English and memorizing them. Watching movies as often as possible was also a source of learning. Listening to the dialogues, he picked up more and more English slowly but surely. He was finally accepted at St. Mary's University in San Antonio, Texas, but on probation, because despite his best efforts, his English was not yet fluent enough.

He nonetheless graduated in 1951 with a degree in chemistry, biology and mathematics. In 1952 he went on to earn a master's degree at Trinity University and initially hoped to become a doctor but was taken on by the Southwest Foundation for Biomedical Research (now known as Texas Biomedical Research Institute) to do research on polio vaccines as well as arteriosclerosis. In Pittsburgh, a researcher by the name of Jonas Salk had developed a vaccine for polio, and this created a need for laboratories across the country to search for ways of producing the serum on an industrial scale. Working as an assistant to the head of the foundation, Dr. Nicholas Werthessen, Nicolás and two others volunteered to be involved in the project, despite the risks entailed when working with the vaccine in its dry form. Although he enjoyed his work at the foundation, the hours were long and the pay was barely sufficient to raise a family on.

In 1953 Nicolás married Irma Alicia Cortez, whom had been dating since they had met at the annual ball at St Mary's. Lacking a tuxedo, Nicolás had been obliged to resort to borrowing a friend's army uniform. Their encounter at the ball was the prelude to a lengthy courtship, and a new direction for Nicolás. They had three children; Emilio Jr., Miriam and Guillermo. They would remain married for 67 years until Nicolás' death in 2019.

In 1955, Nicolás left the Southwest Foundation to devote himself fully to KCOR-AM and KCOR-TV, the first full-time Spanish-language radio and TV station in the continental USA, founded by his father-in-law, Raoul A. Cortez. He quickly took on several roles, working as a cameraman, an advertising salesman, a news producer and a news director. Initially the station had only one camera. By day Nicolás oversaw the news department and by night he produced live programming. Occasionally he would deliver editorials that he had written concerning subjects such as immigration or education. He brought badly needed discipline to a news department that had been somewhat disorganized prior. At the same time as he worked at the television station, Nicolas supplemented his income by producing jingles as well as commercials for advertisers across the US, a sideline that paid him well. In the course of his six years at KCOR-AM and KCOR-TV, Nicolas rose through the ranks and became the station's president. Soon he would also be handling advertising and production in Spanish for clients of Pitluk Advertising, the number one agency in San Antonio at that time.

In the early days, about half of the programs on KCOR-TV were live variety and entertainment shows, featuring some of the best available talent from Mexico. Prerecorded programs and movies were brought in from Mexico. KCOR-TV was a popular station among the Mexican and other Spanish-speaking residents of San Antonio; it was however unprofitable in its early years because advertisers were not very interested in this market and failed to use it for promotions. At the time, Hispanic viewers were not accounted for in the standard ratings services. Moreover, many viewers were cautious about acknowledging their heritage or disclosing their exposure to Spanish language media, for fear of discrimination. Another obstacle was that KCOR-TV broadcast in UHF, which not all TV sets at the time were equipped to receive. The station had been assigned channel 41 on UHF because once the war ended, most of the spare VHF bandwidth was soon taken up by a rash of new channels. The FCC wanted to open up UHF to accommodate further increases in demand. Unfortunately, receiving KCOR-TV required the installation of an additional converter and antenna which were an expensive purchase at that time. UHF was, according to Nicolás, "the real underdog frequency". To get around this, many promotions were held in which UHF-equipped TV sets were given away was prizes, in order to expand the audience.

In late 1961, despite spending heavily on live talent, revenue from advertising continued to be insufficient, and New York's financial institutions being reluctant to extend further credit, Cortez sold KCOR-TV to a group of five investors, including Nicolas and René Anselmo; Cortez's erstwhile partner Frank Fouce; XET's general manager Julian Kaufman, and Mexican entertainment mogul Emilio Azcárraga Vidaurreta, owner of Mexico-based Telesistema Mexicano (forerunner of Televisa). Sadly, Fouce died soon afterwards so his son, Frank Fouce Jr. stepped into his shoes. The partners expanded the company into two separate entities: "SICC", which stands for "Spanish International Communications Corporation", a holding company for an entity which soon expanded to seven TV stations across the country (the maximum number that was allowed by law), in urban centers such as San Francisco, Phoenix, New York and Miami as well as a handful of low-power stations in such cities as Tucson, Arizona and Austin, Texas, and "SIN" (the Spanish International Network), which provided programming and advertising.

Nicolas held a 20% stake in KCOR-TV and would remain as president and general manager for three decades, renaming the station KWEX-TV in February 1962. Nicolas had wanted the new call letters for KCOR-TV to be "KXEW", alas not possible because those particular call letters had already been taken (the first radio station that Azcarraga had set up in Mexico City was called "La XEW"). Finally an acceptable alternative was found: "KWEX". The call letters for KCOR-AM were kept for the radio station and it has continued to broadcast Spanish-language programming until today. Soon after this, they opened KMEX-TV in Los Angeles. They also had TV stations in separate companies like Los Cerezos in DC, Seven Hills in Phoenix, Bahia de San Francisco in SF and others.

In the following decade Nicolás, together with Rene Anselmo, successfully lobbied the U.S. Congress to make it obligatory for all television sets to be compatible with not only the historic VHF signal but also with the new UHF signal. As a result of these efforts, the All-Channel Receiver Act was passed by congress in 1961, bestowing on the FCC the authority to mandate that obligation.

A tireless advocate for Latino rights and for the betterment of the Latino community as a whole, in 1975, Nicolas launched the Teleton Navideno, a holiday-season charity drive that was broadcast on television, the aim of which was to collect funds for the less fortunate in San Antonio, and one which continues to do so today.

In 1976, as a public service to its audience which was predominantly Catholic, Nicolas initiated the first statewide transmission of a Catholic mass, via the SIN Television Network. This mass is broadcast still today from San Antonio's cathedral on Univision stations. In the same year, Nicolas and Rene Anselmo launched a groundbreaking satellite-interconnected television network, with KWEX and San Antonio the center of operations. With this new technology, content would be distributed across the country via satellite under the auspices of SIN, a totally innovative technique at that time and one that would later be replicated by CNN and Fox News. SIN grew exponentially and began airing the national Spanish-language television newscast in 1981. Under their leadership, the SICC network of television stations across the country was able to grow to over 280 affiliates.

Following concerns about FCC rules regarding foreign ownership of US media, the FCC and the U.S. Justice Department eventually encouraged a sale of the network between 1986 and 1987. Hallmark Cards was the highest bidder offering $301.5 million. The sale was orchestrated by Nicolas and after the deal was complete he stepped down. Hallmark Cards chairman at that time was Irvine Hockaday and he hosted a gala evening honoring Nicolas for his leadership over a 40 year career. The network later became Univision, which is at present the Spanish-language network with the highest audience in the US, watched by over 95% of Hispanic households and accounting for annual revenues in excess of $1 billion, in at least 60 markets.

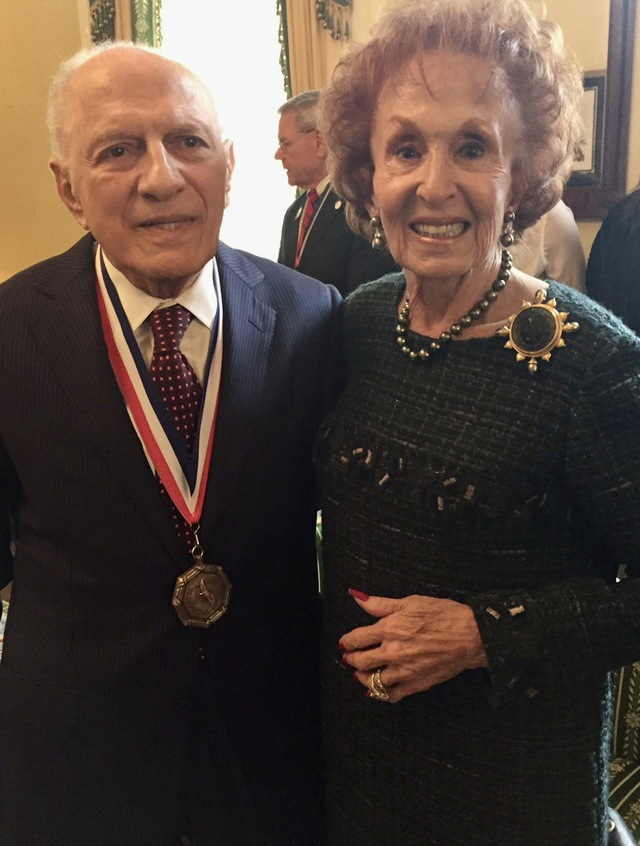
Emilio and Irma

Once their two-year non-compete agreement with Hallmark was over, and after spending precious leisure time traveling with his family throughout France, Nicolás combined forces with Emilio Azcárraga Milmo to expand Galavision, initially a cable channel, into another Spanish language broadcasting powerhouse, now one of the top Hispanic television networks in the US. Emilio Azcárraga Milmo's father was Emilio Azcárraga Vidaurreta and he had pioneered broadcasting in Mexico. Nicolas Communications Corporation (NCC) was set up in order to affiliate with this new broadcasting network. In 2003, Nicolás went into semi-retirement, selling his remaining TV stations to Univision, Entravision and Pappas Telecasting.

== Accolades ==
In a 2005 address to the U.S. House of Representatives, Rep. Charlie Gonzalez, (D-San Antonio), remarked that Nicolás' pioneering legacy was pivotal for Latinos, given the fundamental importance of television in today's society.

Nicolás was the recipient of numerous awards for his endeavors in the domains of advertising, television and civic causes. He received a Ford Foundation Award for work advancing literacy, an OHTLI award (Mexico's highest honor to a countryman living in a foreign land), the Corazon award from Univision, the Texas Medal of the Arts Award (TMAA), the Spirit of Broadcasting Award from the National Association of Broadcasters (NAB), an Emmy and a Telly Award.

Acknowledgement has been bestowed on Nicolás for his far-reaching editorials on subjects impacting Hispanic communities in the United States. Aired on SIN, his editorials attracted national attention to issues such as immigration laws and racial discrimination. Henry Cisneros, former mayor of San Antonio, praised Nicolas for instigating two extremely important U.S. Congress conference meetings. The result of these was the withdrawal of an immigration reform bill which was considered detrimental to Latinos.

In 2006, Nicolás and Cortez were jointly honored by the National Association of Broadcasters for their pioneering work in bringing Hispanic programming to America.

Nicolás served on the boards of the Southwest Foundation, the University of the Incarnate Word, Trinity University, the Moody College of Communication, the University of Texas Health Science Center at San Antonio, the Mexican American Legal Defense and Educational Fund, and the San Antonio Chamber of Commerce. He was also chairperson of the National Association of Spanish Broadcasters

In 2019, the headquarters of Texas Public Radio was named in honor of Nicolás and his wife, Irma.^{.}

In "American Enterprise," a Smithsonian American History Museum exhibit, Nicolás' extensive contributions to American media are recognized. This display traces America's growth from a small, fledgling nation to a global economic powerhouse.

== Death ==
On October 12, 2019, Nicolás died at his residence in San Antonio aged 88.

== Succession ==
Guillermo C. Nicolas His son, (born in San Antonio, TX on Christmas day 1963) is a successful entrepreneur and philanthropist that supports the intercultural communication via arts sponsorship.

The Texas Public Radio headquarters, located in the Alameda Theater in San Antonio (used by his grandfather for his radio and TV studios in the 40s and 50s) was named the Emilio and Irma Nicolas Media Center in honor of his parents because of his efforts
