= KMYO =

Spanish-language adult contemporary radio station in San Antonio

- Comfort, Texas; United States
- Broadcast area: Greater San Antonio
- Frequency: 95.1 MHz (HD Radio)
- Branding: Amor 95.1

Programming
- Language: Spanish
- Format: Adult contemporary

Ownership
- Owner: Uforia Audio Network; (Univision Radio Illinois, Inc.)
- Sister stations: Radio: KBBT; KROM; KVBH; TV: KWEX-DT; KNIC-DT

History
- First air date: 1991
- Former call signs: KYBC (1991–1992); KATG (1992–1994); KRNH (1994–2000); KCOR-FM (2000–2008); KGSX (2008–2014); KCOR-FM (2014–2015)
- Former frequencies: 95.3 MHz (1991–1994)
- Call sign meaning: My Yo! (previous format)

Technical information
- Licensing authority: FCC
- Facility ID: 25469
- Class: C1
- ERP: 100,000 watts
- HAAT: 201 m (659 ft)
- Transmitter coordinates: 29.634°N 98.800°W

Links
- Public license information: Public file; LMS
- Webcast: Listen Live
- Website: KMYO Online

KMYO (95.1 FM, "Amor 95.1") is a Spanish AC radio station owned by Uforia Audio Network in the San Antonio, Texas area. The city of license is Comfort, Texas. Its studios are located in Northwest San Antonio, and the transmitter site is in Lakehills, Texas.

== History ==
KYBC signed on 95.3 MHz in 1991. Three years later, the station became KRNH at 95.1, with the Satellite Music Networks Real Country format.

=== "La Kalle" and first era of "Latino Mix" ===
In 2008, KGSX switched to Latin pop as "95.1 La Kalle". In September 2014, the station rebranded as "Latino Mix".

=== Yo! 95.1: Classic Hip-Hop ===
On December 19, 2014, KGSX flipped to classic hip-hop as "Yo! 95.1" and changed their call letters to KCOR-FM. On January 20, 2015, KCOR-FM changed their call letters to KMYO, to go with the "Yo! 95.1" branding.

=== Return of "Latino Mix" ===
On April 19, 2017, at 5 pm, KMYO dropped its classic hip-hop format and changed to Spanish Top 40, returning to its former branding as "Latino Mix 95.1". Two days after the switch, Alpha Media's KTFM-HD2/K277CX dropped its struggling alternative rock format and picked up the classic hip-hop format, in response to KMYO's flip.

=== Amor 95.1 ===
On September 15, 2022, at 5 pm, after an hour of stunting with songs about Mexico, KMYO flipped to Spanish AC as "Amor 95.1", with the first song being "Fotos y Recuerdos" by Selena.

== Former logos ==
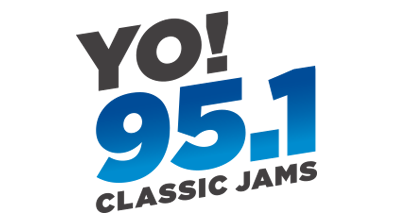
