= Univision =

American Spanish-language free-to-air television network

- Logo used since 2019
- Type: Free-to-air television network
- Country: United States
- Affiliates: See list of affiliates
- Headquarters: 605 Third Avenue; New York City 10158; U.S.

Programming
- Language: Spanish
- Picture format: 1080i HDTV; 1080p via ATSC 3.0 in some markets (re-scaled to 16:9 480i for some affiliated stations)
- Timeshift service: Univision East; Univision West

Ownership
- Owner: Grupo Televisa; TelevisaUnivision
- Key people: Daniel Alegre (CEO)
- Sister channels: UniMás; Galavisión; Univision Tlnovelas; TUDN; see list at bottom

History
- Launched: September 29, 1962; 64 years ago
- Founder: Debateable: Raoul A. Cortez, Emilio Nicolas Sr., Rene Anselmo
- Former names: Spanish International Network (1962–1987)

Links
- Website: www.univision.com (in Spanish)

Availability

Streaming media
- YouTube TV: Internet Protocol television

Univision (Spanish pronunciation: [uniβiˈsjon]) is an American Spanish-language free-to-air television network owned by Grupo Televisa and TelevisaUnivision. It is the United States' largest provider of Spanish-language content. The network's programming includes telenovelas and other drama series, sports, sitcoms, reality and variety series, news programming, and imported Spanish-language feature films. Univision is headquartered in Midtown Manhattan, New York City, and has its major studios, production facilities, and business operations based in Doral, Florida (near Miami).

Univision is available on pay television providers throughout most of the United States, with local stations in over 60 markets with large Spanish-speaking communities. Most of these stations air full local newscasts and other local programming in addition to network shows; in major markets such as Los Angeles, Miami, and New York City, the local newscasts carried by the network's owned-and-operated stations and affiliates are equally competitive with their English-language counterparts ratings-wise.

Randy Falco, who was executive vice president and COO since January 2011, took over as CEO in June that year after the departure of president and CEO Joe Uva in April 2011. In March 2018, Falco announced that he would be retiring and stepping down after seven years as CEO.

In May 2018, Vincent L. Sadusky, having previously been CEO of Media General Inc. and CFO and Treasurer of Telemundo Communications Inc., took over as CEO, replacing Falco.

In February 2020, Searchlight Capital Partners and ForgeLight acquired a 64% majority stake in Univision, with Televisa keeping their 36% minority stake. In December 2020, former Viacom CFO Wade Davis replaced Sadusky as CEO.

== History ==
=== Beginning as Spanish International Network ===
Univision's roots can be traced back to 1955, when Raoul A. Cortez started KCOR-TV, an independent station in San Antonio, Texas, which was the nation's first Spanish-only TV outlet. The station was not profitable during its early years, and in 1961, Cortez sold KCOR-TV – now known as KWEX-TV – to a group headed by Mexican entertainment mogul Emilio Azcárraga Vidaurreta, owner of Mexico-based Telesistema Mexicano (the forerunner of Televisa). Cortez's son-in-law Emilio Nicolás Sr., who helped produce variety programs for the station, held a 20% stake and remained as KWEX general manager for three decades. The new owners helped to turn around the station's fortunes by heavily investing in programming, most of it sourced from Telesistema Mexicano.

On September 29, 1962, Azcárraga and his partners launched a second Spanish-language station, KMEX-TV, in Los Angeles. KWEX and KMEX formed the nucleus of the Azcárraga-owned Spanish International Network (SIN), created in late 1962. SIN was the first television network in the United States to broadcast its programming in a language other than English. From 1963 until 1987, SIN was managed from offices in New York by Rene Anselmo, a U.S. native who had worked for Azcárraga in Mexico City for eight years as head of Telesistema's programming export subsidiary. Having supervised the launch of KMEX, Anselmo spearheaded SIN's expansion, first into the New York City area, when it founded WXTV in Paterson, New Jersey (licensed in 1965 and launched in 1968), next in Fresno, California (licensed in 1969 and launched in 1972 as KFTV), and then by acquiring WLTV in Miami in 1971. That year, Azcárraga and his partners incorporated these five stations (separately from SIN) as the Spanish International Communications Corporation (SICC), with Anselmo named as president.

Over the next 15 years, SIN and SICC would create other top-rated Spanish-language television stations throughout the United States; these included KTVW in Phoenix and KDTV in San Francisco (both owned by Anselmo) and a part-time affiliation with WCIU-TV in Chicago. The Mexican ownership interest in SIN and SICC transferred posthumously from Emilio Azcárraga Vidaurreta to his son, Emilio Azcárraga Milmo, in 1972. On July 4, 1976, the network began distributing its national feed via satellite, which originally was delivered as a superstation-type feed of San Antonio's KWEX-TV, before eventually switching to a direct programming feed of SIN, allowing cable television providers to carry the network on their systems at little cost. Between the mid-1970s and late-1980s, SIN began affiliating with startup Spanish-language stations in markets such as Dallas–Fort Worth (KUVN) and Houston (KXLN), as well as with independent stations that previously broadcast in English.

In Chicago, SIN moved its programming from WCIU-TV to new full-time affiliate WSNS-TV in July 1985. After WSNS was sold to Telemundo in 1988, what had become Univision moved its programming back to WCIU-TV, which agreed to air Univision programming on weekday evenings and weekends. In 1994, the network purchased English-language independent WGBO-TV after WCIU-TV turned down Univision's request to become a full-time affiliate in favor of maintaining its longtime multi-ethnic programming format. WGBO-TV became an Univision-owned station on December 31, 1994.

=== Relaunch as Univision ===
1986 became a pivotal year for the Spanish International Network and its owned-and-operated station group; in 1987, Nicolas sold his stake in the network to a partnership of Hallmark Cards and Televisa for 25 years, which formed Univision Holdings Inc. to operate the network and its stations. The Federal Communications Commission and SIN's competitors had long questioned whether the relationship between SIN and the Azcárraga family was impermissibly tight. Both the FCC and other Spanish-language broadcasters had long suspected that Televisa was merely using Nicolas to skirt FCC rules prohibiting foreign ownership of broadcast media.

The FCC and the U.S. Justice Department eventually encouraged a sale of the network to a properly constituted domestic organization. Spanish International Communications ultimately began discussions with various prospective buyers, culminating in Hallmark Cards (which owned a 63.5% interest), private equity firm First Chicago Venture Capital (which acquired 21.5%) and several other private investors (which collectively owned the remaining 15% held in a trust) purchasing the SIN stations for $600 million, while forming a new relationship with Televisa for the distribution of programs; the new group also adopted a new name for the network, Univision.

The first reference to the new Univision name was in "América, esta es tu canción", a song interpreted by Lucerito on her 1982 album Te prometo. The lyric that mentions the network is "cantaremos al mundo fantástico mágico de Univisión" ("we'll sing to the fantastic, magical world of Univision").

The initial logo under the Univision name Spanish International Network, that was used from 1987 to 1989; the logo was similar in resemblance to Televisa's station logo. Televisa still uses this logo today.

Joaquin Blaya, the network's new chief executive officer, would sign agreements to carry two programs that would change the face of the network. He signed contracts to develop programs hosted by Cristina Saralegui (who became the host of the long-running talk show El Show de Cristina ("The Cristina Show"), which aired on the network for 22 years) and Chilean-born Mario Kreutzberger – better known as Don Francisco (who brought his popular variety series Sábado Gigante ("Giant Saturday") to the U.S., which aired on Univision for 29 years until its cancellation in September 2015) – for the network. Univision also began production of its first morning program, Mundo Latino, which was anchored by Cuban natives Lucy Pereda and Frank Moro; Moro left the network to move to Mexico to continue his career as a soap opera actor, the network then brought in Jorge Ramos to replace him.

To appeal to Hispanics and Latinos of all nationalities, the network soon instituted a policy of maintaining neutrality with its use of Spanish dialects, slang and humor on its domestically produced programs, enforcing program producers to limit the use of humor and slang relatable only to a specific Hispanic nationality. It also prohibited the use of English in its programming or advertisements (outside of product titles and dialogue featured in film trailers), most obvious in the use of Spanish equivalent placenames such as "Nueva York" rather than New York. In 1988, Blaya also substantially ramped up production of American-based programs on Univision's lineup, reducing the share of programming imported from Latin America (most of which came from Televisa) on its schedule. With this, the network began producing programs for a national audience in mind, resulting in Univision's schedule consisting of 50% foreign programming and 50% U.S.-produced programming.

The first such program, TV Mujer ("Woman TV"), was a magazine-style talk show aimed at American Hispanic women, originally hosted by Pereda and Gabriel Traversari, featuring a mix of cooking and entertainment segments. The following year, Pereda was replaced as co-host by Mexican-American Lauri Flores, who previously swas director of programming, promotions, special events and public information at Houston affiliate KXLN-TV – where she also hosted a local community affairs program, Entre Nos. During Flores' tenure as host of TV Mujer, the program remained the #1 daytime show on Spanish-language television, outperforming its competition in its time period by 33%. Telemundo's Dia a Dia, which debuted prior to the premiere of TV Mujer, saw its ratings diminish as a result. Sábado Gigante model Jackie Nespral was added as host of the program for its final year on the network; she was originally hired as a fill-in co-host while Flores went on maternity leave, before becoming a full-time host during the show's final season. TV Mujer inspired a series of other programs, including Hola, America ("Hello, America") and Al Mediodia ("At Noon"), which never garnered the ratings of the original concept and were ultimately canceled.

However, the network's fortunes began to wane following the Hallmark purchase, when Televisa terminated its programming agreement with Univision, taking along with it the company's popular telenovelas. The network opted to replace the Mexican-produced serials with novelas produced in South America; however, viewership for its telenovelas declined with the programming shift. To make matters worse, with limited revenue from advertising, the sale to Hallmark left Univision with a huge debt load to cover. On February 1, 1990, Univision Holdings disclosed that it had failed to make an interest payment of about $10 million (totaling about $3 million to be paid to its bank lenders and about $7 million to holders of its junk-bond debt) that was due a day prior as part of its efforts to restructure its debt, citing insufficient cash flow for the missed payments. At the time, Univision had owed about $315 million to a group of banks led by Continental Bank of Chicago, about $135 million in senior subordinated zero-coupon debt and $105 million in 13 3/8% in outstanding subordinated debentures.

On March 30, Univision filed a motion in U.S. Bankruptcy Court to seek Chapter 11 creditor protection and financial reorganization unless it could convince its bondholders to accept an increased offer by Hallmark Cards Inc., in which they would receive $131 million for a face value of $270 million in securities on a blended basis, following an initial bid that was widely turned down by the bondholders. The holders of two different series of Univision Holdings' debt accepted the bid and tendered their securities by April 13, preventing the bankruptcy protection proceedings, with Hallmark's offer to purchase the debt securities being completed by April 25.

=== Revamp and competition with Telemundo in the 1990s and 2000s ===
Univision logo designed by Chermayeff & Geismar, used from January 1, 1990 to December 31, 2012. Univision used as screen bug until April 1, 2014

On April 8, 1992, Hallmark sold Univision to a group that included Los Angeles-based investor A. Jerrold Perenchio (a former partner in Norman Lear's Embassy Communications, who was outbid by the Hallmark-led consortium for the network in 1987), Emilio Azcárraga Milmo, and brothers Ricardo and Gustavo Cisneros (co-owners of Venezuelan broadcaster Venevision) for $550 million, in order to refocus its television operation efforts on cable provider Cencom Cable Associates, which it acquired the previous year for about $500 million. In order to comply with FCC rules on foreign ownership of television stations, the deal was structured to give Perenchio a controlling 75% interest in Univision's station group and 50% ownership of the network itself; Azcárraga and the Cisneroses held a 25% stake in the network and a 12.5% stake in the station group. The deal placed Univision under common ownership with competing cable channel Galavisión, which the Azcárraga-run Grupo Televisa owned at the time. The Cisneroses' ownership of stake in Univision led to the broadcast of Venevision telenovelas from Venezuela, & eventually, to the co-production partnership of Venevision International and Univision of telenovelas. The consortium ended up selling Univision for $13.7 billion in 2007.

The sale raised concerns by several Latino activist groups such as the National Hispanic Media Coalition – which subsequently filed a petition to the FCC to deny the sale of Univision and its television stations – that it would lead to a drastic reduction in Univision's domestically originated programming output in favor of lower-cost, imported Latin American content, and allow Azcárraga to potentially expand control of American Spanish language television in the manner of Televisa's near-monopoly in Mexican media. Indeed, this concern was effectively confirmed in the release of an FCC filing for the Perenchio-Televisa-Venevision purchase in which Perenchio indicated "the programs offered[...] by Televisa and Venevision will include at least a quantity of programs sufficient to fill a 24-hour-a-day, seven-day-a-week broadcast schedule", with local content consisting only of newscasts. This led Joaquin Blaya to resign from his role as Univision's president in May 1992 – after Perenchio had earlier assured him that the amount of domestic national programming on the network and its nine owned-and-operated stations would not be reduced before the filing was disclosed – concerned that it would limit opportunities to increase the amount of local programming content on Univision's stations.

Blaya was then hired by Telemundo as its president and chief executive officer, and was subsequently joined by four other Univision senior executives on that network's production and management team. The FCC expedited its review of the deal, and approved the purchase on September 30, 1992, stating that the consortium was quantified to acquire Univision and that it was "unconvinced" by the petitioners' arguments that it would dilute the amount of American programming on the network. Subsequently, in January 1993, Univision canceled three U.S.-produced programs – the newsmagazines Portada ("Cover Story") and Al Mediodía and the variety series Charytin International – resulting in the layoffs of 70 production staffers based at Univision's Miami headquarters and at Al Mediodía's base in Los Angeles; although two of the three programs were replaced by Televisa series (Portada was replaced in its Wednesday night slot with the variety series El Nuevo Show ("The New Show"), a Los Angeles-based series hosted by Paul Rodriguez, which had aired on Saturdays for several years prior), Univision executives cited that all three programs were discontinued due to low ratings and not because of any plan to eschew American programming with imported content. Televisa and Venevision's stakes in the network in exchange the two foreign partners get 14.7% of Univision's revenue also gave Univision access to a broad selection of programs from Televisa and Venevision are locked up until 2017.

In 1993, Univision owner Jerry Perenchio, in a swift and unprecedented move, after the acquisition, appointed a 27-year-old, Los Angeles native, Venezuelan-born, Miguel Banojian, known for his in-depth of the U.S. and Latin American Hispanic market, his impeccable professional skills, as well as his proven successful ratings track records to turn around the operations of the station group, but mainly Univision's West Coast flagship KMEX-Channel 34 Los Angeles, generating at the time of purchase of the company, approximately 40% of the overall Univision revenue. Under Banojian, the network increased monetary investments in the stations, expanding staff and resources, introducing new sets for its newscasts, hiring and appointing KVEA's main anchor Jesus Javier, reporter Pepe Barreto also from KVEA, as well as hiring Andrea Kutyas, joining news anchor Eduardo Quezada, who worked at KMEX from 1975 to 2003, to lead and reshape KMEX's 11 p.m. newscast, which became the #1 late news in the Los Angeles Market. The overall re-organization effort, included, the purchasing of new live production equipment, updated production units, new master control equipment; new station antennas with more transmission power and a new studio located in Westchester, replacing the Hollywood studio which served from 1962 to March 1993. Same year, A Mexico City-based "MEDIA HUB CENTER ALLIANCE" was created by Televisa AND KMEX; both companies shared its operational, technical and resources strengths to increase market presence, Miguel Banojian representing KMEX, Alejandro Burillo Azcarraga, Shareholder & Executive VP of Televisa and Félix Cortés Camarillo VP of News & Production operations of Televisa, signed the alliance which included shared news bureaus in Mexico City, Los Angeles, Tijuana, San Francisco, Dallas, and Houston; Such alliance locked a leasing agreement of "Two" 24 hours transponders from its newly launched Geostationary "Intelsat 601", which served the satellite sharing between the two countries; the newly created satellite hub was later used by both networks to share programming and sales needs. One of the iconic marketing move to revamp the then dying "KMEX" station, Mr. Banojian and the KMEX group of engineers, also designed, created and launched what became, "The first U.S Hispanic Aerial Newsgathering operation", which included a brand new helicopter with call sign "Aguila 1" ("Eagle one" in its English translation). The news sets, production equipment, master control equipment, and antenna were upgraded. With all these operational moves, not only did KMEX-34 poise itself to acquire 70% of the Hispanic market share in Los Angeles market against its competitors including Telemundo, but achieved something unprecedented in U.S. television history: KMEX Channel 34 became the first Spanish-language television station ever to outperform English-language network stations (like NBC station KNBC, CBS station KCBS-TV, ABC station KABC-TV and Fox station KTTV) and overcame what had been Telemundo's national competitive edge against Univision. That year, Univision increased its advertising rates and was able to increase its cash flow, which allowed to go on to a purchase mode, acquiring KXLN, the first Spanish-language television station in the Houston market. Perenchio also invested $37 million, in conjunction with rival Telemundo, to develop the National Hispanic Television Index, a ratings system created by A.C. Nielsen to track viewership of Spanish language television networks. Perenchio also implemented new programming requirements in which non-sports programs were no longer allowed to run 20 minutes over their allotted timeslot.

Jesus Javier was hired as KVEA's main anchor, joined by reporter Pepe Barreto. Andrea Kuyas and veteran (1975 to 2003) KMEX news anchor Eduardo Quezada led the 11 p.m. newscast, which became the #1 late news in the Los Angeles market.

Also in 1993, KMEX agreed to share operational and technical resources with Televisa to enhance market presence. Banojian representing KMEX, with Televisa executive VP Alejandro Burillo Azcarraga, and Félix Cortés Camarillo, Televisa News and Production VP signed the "Media Hub Center Alliance", which included shared news bureaus in Mexico City, Los Angeles, Tijuana, San Francisco, Dallas, and Houston. The alliance leased two 24-hour transponders on the new Intelsat 601 to share programming and ads.

KMEX also purchased a new helicopter "Aguila 1" ("Eagle 1"), becoming the first Hispanic station in the U.S. to add aerial capability.

Univision increased its advertising rates and subsequently was able to acquire KXLN, the first Spanish-language television station in the Houston market. Perenchio also invested $37 million, in conjunction with Telemundo and A.C. Nielsen, to develop the National Hispanic Television Index to track viewership in Spanish language markets. Perenchio also implemented new programming requirements in which non-sports programs were no longer allowed to run 20 minutes over their allotted timeslot.[5]

In 1996, Perenchio took Univision Holdings public for the first time. Univision also appointed Mario Rodriguez as its president of programming; Rodriguez developed a strategy to provide programming that would appeal to both Latino immigrants and native citizens, and increased domestic programming production (much of which consisted primarily of news, talk, and variety shows) to encompass 52% of the network's schedule. Univision also adopted the standard Latin American model of programming its prime-time telenovela lineup to appeal to different target audiences (with novelas aimed children airing at 7:00 p.m., those aimed teenagers at 8:00 p.m. and novelas targeted toward adults scheduled at 9:00 p.m. Eastern and Pacific). The following year, the network appointed former Housing and Urban Development secretary Henry Cisneros as its president and CEO, a post he remained in until his resignation in 2000 to head American CityVista, a contracting company that builds residential communities in inner cities.

At the same time, citing its dominance in the Spanish-language television market, having consistently beaten Telemundo and other smaller Spanish language networks in the ratings, the network decided to refocus its efforts on attracting Hispanic and Latinos viewers who preferred watching programs on English language broadcast and cable networks to grow its viewership further. The strategy helped Univision to nearly double its ratings during prime time by 1998, ranking as the fifth most-watched American broadcast network by the 1998–99 season (beating fledgling English-language networks UPN and The WB), as it steadily began to attract bilingual viewers away from the English-language networks. In September 1998, the network added two new shows to shore up its struggling afternoon lineup leading into the highly rated Cristina. While one of the programs – the game show El Bla-Blazo – lasted only a few years, it experienced more long-term success with the newsmagazine that followed it, El Gordo y La Flaca ("The Scoop and the Skinny", although alternately translated as "The Fat Man and the Skinny Girl"), a Miami-based entertainment news program hosted by Raul De Molina and Lili Estefan, who had become popular with viewers for their entertainment reports on the network's news programs.

In June 2001, Univision entered into a local marketing agreement (LMA) with Raycom Media to operate two television stations in Puerto Rico, WLII in Caguas and WSUR in Ponce, as part of a planned and protracted purchase of the two stations. At the time, WLII had long maintained an LMA with another Puerto Rican station, WSTE, which Univision maintained. Also around this time, Univision resumed its broadcast expansion by converting several television stations that it had acquired into affiliates of the network, including those in Raleigh, North Carolina (WUVC), Baltimore, Maryland (WQAW), Cleveland, Ohio (WQHS), Philadelphia, Pennsylvania (WUVP) and Atlanta, Georgia (WUVG) – including one acquired from USA Broadcasting that had previously been affiliated with the Home Shopping Network, which was left out of the group's charter affiliation deals for Univision Communications' secondary network TeleFutura (now UniMás) when it launched in January of that year. Both WLII and WSUR were sold to Univision Communications outright in 2005. Since that point, Univision also signed affiliation agreements with television stations owned by other media companies in cities such as Detroit, Seattle, Portland, Oregon, Minneapolis, Oklahoma City, Nashville and Kansas City – expanding its affiliate body further outside the Univision-owned stations and stations owned by Entravision Communications.

In June 2002, Univision acquired Dallas-based Hispanic Broadcasting Corp., owner of Spanish language radio stations in markets such as New York City (WADO), Los Angeles (KLVE), San Antonio (KGSX, now KMYO) and Dallas (KESS), in a $3.5 billion all-stock transaction. Following the FCC's long-awaited approval of the acquisition, the group was renamed Univision Radio. The negotiations to merge the two companies followed years of on-again/off-again negotiations in which each company made an offer to acquire the other, as well as occasional takeover attempts of other television and radio station groups (HBC once attempted to broker a deal to merge with the Spanish Broadcasting System, and made a failed attempt to acquire Telemundo before Sony Pictures Entertainment and Liberty Media acquired that network in 1998).

In April 2003, KMEX news anchor Eduardo Quezada left for KVEA and spent three years working as a news anchor before retiring in 2006; his oldest son, Eduardo Quezada Jr., is one of the news writers and editors at KMEX.

In late 2004, a feud began between Perenchio and Televisa head Emilio Azcárraga Jean, regarding Univision's continual editing of Televisa's programming, and the failure to pay for rights to broadcast Televisa-produced sports and specials. The feud intensified to the point where Grupo Televisa filed a breach of contract lawsuit against Univision in a U.S. federal court in June 2005, accusing the network of several actions, including "unauthorized editing" of Televisa programming; Televisa also barred its most famous stars from appearing on any Univision-produced series and specials. Rumors also circulated that Univision would form a partnership with Televisa's longtime rival TV Azteca, which for a short period of time, bought airtime rights and allowed its video footage to be used on Univision's news programs.

During the 2000s, Univision also lost several key on-air personalities to Telemundo, including longtime weekend news anchor María Antonieta Collins (who left to host the morning program Cada Dia), Primer Impacto anchor María Celeste Arrarás (who became the host of a similarly formatted newsmagazine, Al Rojo Vivo) and sports announcers Andrés Cantor (known to many Americans for his exuberant announcement of "Goal!" during football matches) and Norberto Longo. By the middle of the decade, Univision overtook UPN and The WB – which shut down in September 2006 and were replaced by The CW, which Univision also outranks – as the fifth highest-rated network in total viewership; since then, it also sometimes posts higher viewership in the key age demographics of Adults 18–34 and Adults 18–49.

Other key on-air personalities that joined Telemundo from Univision or Televisa in the 2000s are Lucero, Pedro Fernandez, Kate del Castillo, Aracely Arámbula, Raúl González, Blanca Soto, Laura Flores, Ana María Canseco, Cristina Saralegui, Fernando Fiore, Rodner Figueroa, fired for comparing Michelle Obama to a character from the movie Planet of the Apes, Barbara Bermudo, laid off by the network, Don Francisco, Natalia Cruz, Maria Elena Salinas, who retired in December 2017 after 36 years of news service, Arantxa Loizaga Lourdes Stephen, Felix Fernandez, laid off by the network, Jorge Ramos, who retired in December 2024 after 40 years of news service, and Maity Interiano, laid off by the network.

On April 7, 2005, Univision aired Selena ¡VIVE! ("Selena Lives!"), a three-hour tribute concert in honor of slain singer Selena (who was murdered via gunshot in March 1995 by a fan who worked as part of her managerial staff). The concert earned a 35.9 Nielsen household rating, becoming the highest-rated program that night on all of the network television as well as the most-watched Spanish-language program in American television history.

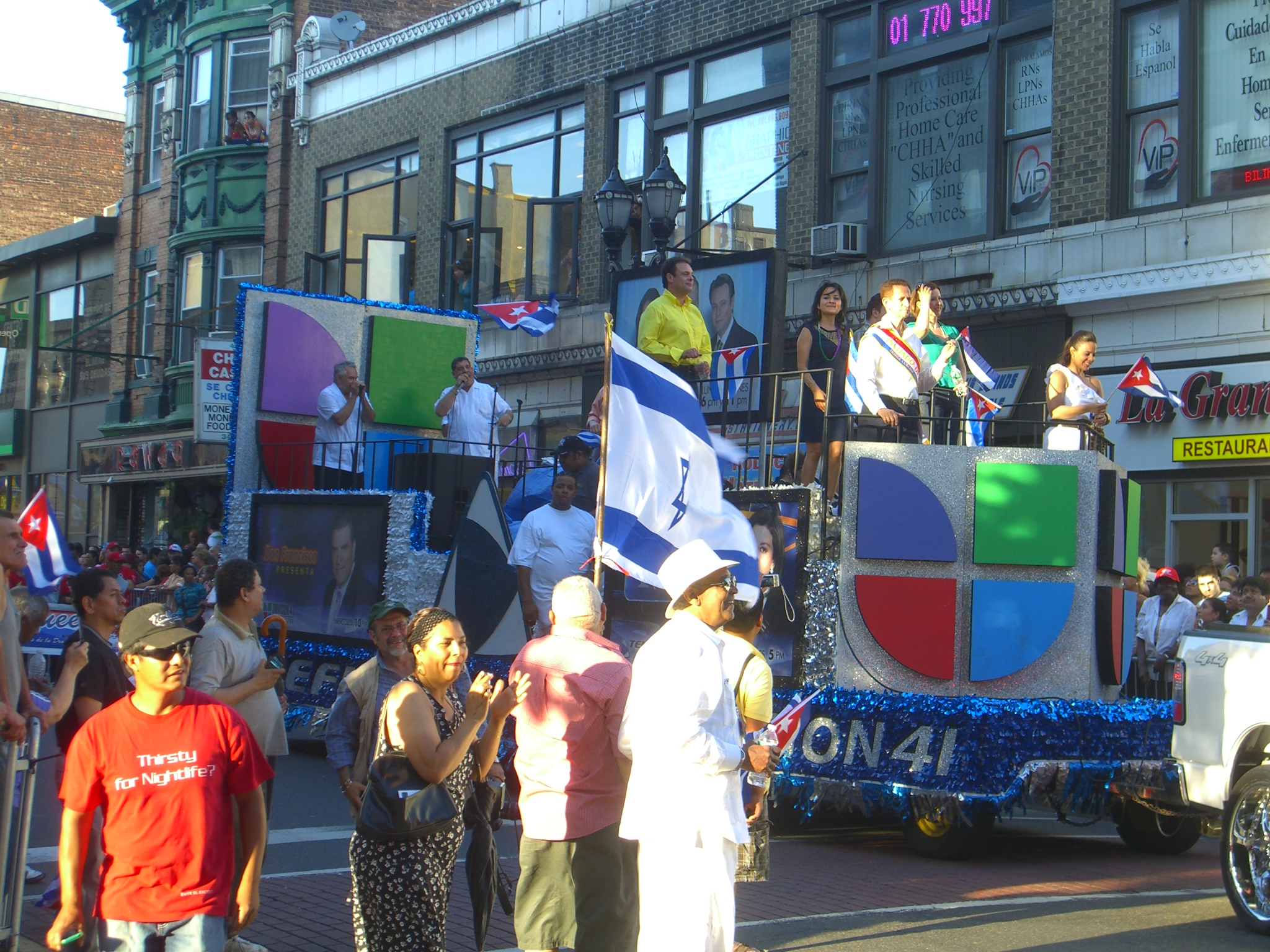
A Univision float in the 2010 North Hudson Cuban Day Parade in Union City, New Jersey

On February 9, 2006, Univision Communications announced that it was putting itself up for sale. News Corporation chairman Rupert Murdoch stated that his company was considering buying Univision, but backed off that position (the company had already owned duopolies in several markets, and could not acquire the existing Univision stations in any event as FCC rules prohibit common ownership of three television stations in a single market except in cases where a market has 20 full-power stations, and sell some of its stations to get below the FCC's 39% market reach cap for any individual station owner). Other expected bidders included Grupo Televisa (which would have had to acquire the network under a partnership, due to FCC laws that restrict ownership of a television station or network by a foreign company to a percentage of no more than 25%), Time Warner, CBS Corporation, Viacom, The Walt Disney Company, Bill Gates, and several private equity firms. The Tribune Company was rumored to be interested in buying Univision's sister network TeleFutura.

On June 27, 2006, Univision Communications was acquired by Broadcasting Media Partners Inc. – a consortium of investment firms led by the Haim Saban-owned Saban Capital Group (which had previously owned Saban Entertainment until its sale to The Walt Disney Company in June 2001, as part of News Corporation's sale of Fox Family Worldwide), TPG Capital, L.P., Providence Equity Partners, Madison Dearborn Partners and Thomas H. Lee Partners – for $12.3 billion (increasing to $13.7 billion or $36.25 per share by the sale's closure), plus the assumption of $1.4 billion in debt. The sale received federal approval and was formally consummated on March 27, 2007.

The buyout left the company with a debt level of twelve times its annual cash flow, which was twice the debt incurred in buyouts that occurred over the previous two years. However, Univision's shareholders filed two class action lawsuits against Univision Communications and its board members to stop the buyout – one of which claimed that the board members structured the deal to only benefit the company's insiders and not average stockholders, while the other was filed on behalf of a shareholder identified as L A Murphy, who claimed that the board put its own personal interests and the interests of the winning bidder ahead of shareholders, and also failed to adequately evaluate the company's worth. Additional lawsuits were filed in the meantime, including one against the Univision Records division for heavy-handed tactics, and a suit filed by a winner of a $30,000 makeover prize in a contest held by the network's morning program ¡Despierta América! who alleged that Univision broke its own contest rules.

On June 25, 2007, with the finale of La Fea Más Bella ("The Prettiest Ugly Girl", a telenovela based on the Colombian series Yo Soy Betty, la Fea), Univision led all U.S. broadcast networks – English and Spanish – with a 3.0 rating out of 9 share, placing as the second most-watched network television program that week. Later that year, Univision hosted the first Spanish-language presidential debate in the United States at the University of Miami, featuring candidates vying for the Democratic nomination. In May 2008, Univision Music Group was sold to Universal Music Group and combined with the latter's Latin music label to become Universal Music Latin Entertainment.

In 2009, the network sponsored a countdown in Times Square, similar to the New Year's Eve event. On the evening of June 12, at 11:59 p.m. Eastern Time, a 60-second countdown appeared on the Jumbotron-size screen in the Manhattan district to mark the shutdown of full-power analog television signals in the Eastern Time Zone, culminating in the message "BIENVENIDOS A LA ERA DIGITAL" ("welcome to the digital era"). The countdown was aired live by the network during Ultima Hora: Una Nueva Era, a special edition of its late-evening newscast Noticiero Univision: Ultima Hora. The ball was lighted in white but was not dropped, remaining positioned at the bottom where the lighted "2009" sign also remained, despite the four-month delay of the digital television transition from February 17. On December 7 of that year, Univision announced it would launch an in-house production division, Univision Studios, a Doral, Florida-based company that would produce original programming content for Univision and TeleFutura; former RTVE president Luis Fernandez was appointed to lead the new division.

=== 2010s ===
Univision logo, used from January 1, 2013 to January 29, 2019. The current logo (shown in the infobox) is similar to this logo, but renders it in a two-dimensional look.

During the first week of September 2011, the network reached a milestone, earning its first #1 ranking in the ratings among all American broadcast television networks – English and Spanish – in the 18–49 age demographic, assisted by a prime time soccer match between Mexico and Ecuador and the season finale of the Colombian reality game show Desafío: La Gran Batalla ("Challenge: The Great Battle"), along with the English networks having traditionally weak programming that time of year, prior to the launch of the fall television season.

In October 2011, Televisa reached an agreement to acquire a 5% ownership stake in Univision (marking the third time that the company held equity in Univision Communications in its history), with the option of expanding its interest in the future. As part of the deal, Televisa also signed a long-term extension to its program licensing agreement with Univision – which runs through at least 2020, through with an option to extend it to 2025 or later – which expanded upon the previous agreement, which was set to expire in 2017, to give Univision rights to stream Televisa content via the internet and on mobile platforms and covers key rights to matches from Mexican soccer leagues.

On October 17, 2012, Univision Communications unveiled an updated corporate logo, which was adopted on-air by the Univision network during the broadcast of its New Year's Eve countdown program ¡Feliz 2013! ("Happy 2013!") on December 31. The new logo shares the multicolored quadrant design of the previous logo (which had been used since January 1990), but now resembles a three-dimensional heart to represent its new slogan, "El latido del corazón hispano de Estados Unidos" ("The Hispanic Heartbeat of the United States"). The revised logo's new three-dimensional shape was intended to represent Univision's recent growth as a "360-degree", multi-platform media company, while its seamless form represented the unity of Hispanic cultures.

On May 8, 2012, Univision and ABC News announced that the two companies would jointly create an English-language digital cable and satellite news channel, later given the name Fusion in February 2013, that would be primarily aimed at English-speaking Hispanic and Latino American audiences; Fusion was launched on October 28, 2013.

The Root, an online magazine on African-American culture, was acquired by Univision in 2015. In January 2016, The Onion was acquired, along with its sibling properties. In April 2016, Univision bought out Disney's stake in Fusion. Afterwards, Fusion was made the anchor of online news publications group Fusion Media, which included the likes of The Onion and The Root.

Univision Story House was introduced in May 2016 as the content development and production unit. In August 2016, FMG acquired the online properties of Gawker Media, excluding Gawker.com, and renamed the company Gizmodo Media Group.

By April 2018, Vanity Fair reported Fusion Media to be deprioritized. In July 2018, it was reported that Univision plans on selling the Gizmodo Media Group and The Onion. In April 2019, Gizmodo Media Group and The Onion were sold to Great Hill Partners. The sale was completed on April 8, 2019, with Gizmodo Media Group and The Onion being merged to form G/O Media, Inc.

During the 2010s, the network reached viewership parity with the five major English-language U.S. broadcast television networks.

=== 2020s ===
In February 2020, Searchlight Capital Partners, LP ("Searchlight"), a global private investment firm, and ForgeLight LLC ("ForgeLight"), an operating and investment company focused on the media and consumer technology sectors, acquired 64% ownership stake of Univision, Televisa to maintain its 36% stake in Univision, and appointed former Viacom EVP and CFO Wade Davis as its CEO. The US federal government approved the foreign acquisition under specific conditions around safeguards of personal identifiable information of US consumers.

In March 2020, Univision launched in Latin America (excluding Mexico) replacing the panregional feed of Unicable.

In April 2021, Televisa announced that their ownership stake in Univision would increase to 45% and would merge its media, content, and production assets with Univision, creating its new parent company TelevisaUnivision.

In November 2021, Univision reacquired local stations in Tampa, Florida, Orlando, Florida and Washington, D.C., from affiliate operator Entravision.

On September 27, 2023, Univision co-hosted the second Republican primary debate, alongside Fox Business and Rumble, from the Ronald Reagan Presidential Library in Simi Valley, California, with its anchor, Ilia Calderón, serving as a moderator alongside Stuart Varney and Dana Perino.

On November 7, 2023, TelevisaUnivision CEO Wade Davis, as well as TelevisaUnivision Mexico co-CEOs Bernardo Gómez Martínez and Alfonso de Angoitia Noriega, met with former President Donald Trump at his residence in Mar-a-Lago. And on November 9, the network aired a special hourlong exclusive interview with him, with Enrique Acevedo of N+ as the interviewer. Due to a new unannounced policy prohibiting opposition advertising in single candidate interviews, the network abruptly canceled President Joe Biden's campaign ads which were set to air on network affiliates in Nevada, Arizona, Pennsylvania, and Florida during the Trump interview. The network also canceled a scheduled response with Maca Casado, Biden's Hispanic media director, which was set to air after the Trump interview. In the days following the interview, Univision's most prominent news anchor, León Krauze, left the network after 13 years of working with them, prompting many to believe that his departure was due to the way that Univision handled the Trump interview. The Washington Post reported that Jared Kushner, Trump's son-in-law, helped arrange the event and was in the room with the TelevisaUnivision executive. Well-known Latino artists and activists like political commentator and co-host of The View Ana Navarro and comedian, actor and host of The Daily Show John Leguizamo have been taking to social media to encourage people to boycott Univision due to the gracious tone of the interview, the softball questions asked during the interview, and the lack of follow-up questions, with some even calling Univision "MAGAvision". More than 80 organizations, including prominent Latino groups such as the Mexican American Legal Defense and Educational Fund (MALDEF), America's Voice and the Coalition for Humane Immigrant Rights, signed an open letter to Davis and other TelevisaUnivision executives, sharply criticizing the interview.

In August 2024, Univision welcomed two new affiliates, WHMB-TV in Indianapolis and WHME-TV in South Bend, both in Indiana.

In September 2025, Google and Univision's parent company TelevisaUnivision could not renew their contract, which caused all channels run by TelevisaUnivision to be taken off of YouTube TV. In response, TelevisaUnivision issued their own statement saying that Google should "do the right thing," and removing the channels during Hispanic Heritage Month was "insensitive and offensive."

== Programming ==
Univision operates on a 164-hour network programming schedule, which it adopted in January 2013. The network's base programming feed provides general entertainment programming on an uninterrupted 24-hour schedule each weekday, from 5:00 to 6:00 a.m. Monday through Friday and 8:00 a.m. to 5:00 a.m. Eastern and Pacific Time on Saturdays and Sundays (the first three hours of the secondary weekend schedule on Saturday and Sunday mornings, starting at 8:00 a.m. Eastern and Pacific Time, is occupied by the children's programming block "Planeta U"). The remaining weekend time periods are filled with infomercials (prior to 2013, the network had programmed a full 168-hour schedule, with reruns of past Televisa-produced entertainment programs filling the two hours on Saturday and Sundays now occupied by paid programming).

Although Univision's owned-and-operated stations and affiliates largely rely on the network's master feed to fill their daily broadcast schedule, many of its stations also produce their own local programming, usually in the form of newscasts and public affairs programs (production of local infotainment programming, and leasing of brokered programs such as direct response and religious content, is at the station's discretion). Many Univision stations and affiliates usually air limited local news programming, which are commonly reserved for early and late evening timeslots on Monday through Friday nights, with the master feed incorporating alternate programming that news programming may pre-empt on its broadcast outlets during these designated time periods (as well as others in which stations carry additional local programs); some of its stations may also air newscasts on weekday mornings (these are mainly limited to the network's O&Os and affiliates in larger markets) and/or on weekend evenings.

The majority of Univision's programming consists of telenovelas and series produced by Televisa, the majority of which originated on the company's flagship network in Mexico, Las Estrellas. Normally, the telenovelas would be on Las Estrellas for a few weeks, then airing in the United States on Univision, causing a delay. Prior to 2009, Univision had also broadcast telenovelas and other programs produced by Venezuelan broadcaster Venevisión. Otherwise, Univision produces a moderate amount of original programming, including the reality competition series Nuestra Belleza Latina ("Our Latin Beauty"), La Banda ("The Band") and Mi Pongo Mi Pie ("I Stand Up"); national news programming; entertainment news shows El Gordo y La Flaca and Sal y pimienta ("Salt and Pepper"); and sports discussion program República Deportiva ("Sports Republic"). Univision also operates its own television production unit, Univision Studios, which its corporate parent launched in 2009 and produces original content for the network.

The network's signature program, the variety show Sabado Gigante, hosted by Don Francisco, aired on Univision every Saturday night from April 12, 1986 to September 19, 2015 (its final episode was broadcast live in the U.S., Mexico and in Chile, where the program originated in 1962); in addition, from September 2004 to May 2015, Univision aired Clásicos de Sábado Gigante ("Giant Saturday Classics"), an early Sunday morning program consisting of condensed two-hour episodes of the series on an approximately one-year delay from their original broadcast. After Sabado Gigante ended its 29-year run on the network, Univision continued the Saturday evening variety tradition with its move of the Televisa-produced music and game show Sabadazo – which it had aired on Saturday afternoons since the show moved from sister network TeleFutura (now UniMás) in September 2012 – into part of Gigante's former time slot on October 17, 2015, before reverting to an afternoon slot and being replaced by the investigative news program Crónicas De Sábado after four months due to low ratings. As such, Univision is one of only two American television networks that airs the first-run program during Saturday prime time (CBS is the only other, although ABC, Fox and occasionally NBC broadcast live sporting events during Saturday prime on certain weeks of the year).

Univision also typically airs drama and variety series in the afternoon (telenovelas that appeal to teen or pre-teen audiences previously aired on early Saturday afternoons until 2011). Scripted series and variety shows (such as Bailando por un Sueño ("Dancing for a Dream"), Como Dice el Dicho ("As the Proverb Goes") and El Chavo Animado ("El Chavo: The Animated Series")) largely make up Univision's weekend lineup. Reality programming became a focal point of the network's Sunday primetime schedule beginning in 2007, with the debut of the beauty pageant competition series Nuestra Belleza Latina ("Our Latin Beauty"). Sitcoms, once a major part of the network's schedule, have a reduced presence on Univision in recent years; since 2008, the network has only obtained rights to two comedies produced by Televisa since that time (Durmiendo con mi Jefe ("Sleeping with My Boss") and Todo en Incluido ("All Inclusive"), both of which began airing on Univision in 2014), although it continues to air comedies that are no longer in production to which Univision continues to maintain U.S. distribution rights (including the family sitcom La Familia P. Luche and the sketch comedies La Hora Pico, Desmadruga2 and its spin-off Estrella2), mainly in overnight and select weekend timeslots.

Although its reliance on them has greatly decreased since 2009, the network also airs some feature films, generally older Mexican imported films from the 1960s to the 1980s, which occasionally air in weekend timeslots not occupied by afternoon football events or Sunday evening reality programs (this is in contrast to UniMás and Telemundo, which both air Spanish-dubbed versions of films produced for the English-language market, although Telemundo also airs Mexican-produced films in overnight timeslots). Until September 2009, when the network began ceding the time period to telenovelas, Univision filled the 10:00 p.m. (Eastern and Pacific Time) hour on Monday through Fridays with various programs each night (including Cristina, Don Francisco Presenta ("Don Francisco Presents"), the newsmagazine Aqui y Ahora ("Here and Now") and Televisa-produced sitcoms and sketch comedies), mirroring the scheduling of English language broadcast networks.

=== Distribution agreements ===
Country	Content partner
Mexico	Televisa (XEW-TDT, XEQ-TDT, XHGC-TDT and XHTV-TDT), Televisa Regional, Televisa Networks
Dominican Republic	Grupo Telemicro
Venezuela	Venevisión Media (Venevisión and Ve Plus TV)
Colombia	Radio Televisión Nacional de Colombia, Caracol Television and RCN Television
Honduras	TVC Channel 5
Peru	Grupo ATV (América Televisión, ATV, Global Television, La Tele, ATV+ and ATV Sur)
Argentina	TV Pública Digital and El Trece
Chile	Telecanal and La Red
Puerto Rico (Note: Note: Puerto Rico is an unincorporated territory of the United States.)	TeleOnce
Brazil	RecordTV
Costa Rica	canal 2 (Univision de Costa Rica), teletica and Repretel
El Salvador	Telecorporación Salvadoreña (Channels 4 and 6).
Panama	Telemetro and RPC

=== English subtitles ===
On January 30, 2012, Univision became the second Spanish language network in the United States to provide English closed captions transmitted over the CC3 caption channel, and the third broadcast network overall to provide bilingual closed captions in any format. The captions are intended to attract Hispanic viewers and others who are not fluent in Spanish, and primarily appear during the network's evening telenovela block each Monday through Friday from 7:00 to 11:00 p.m. Eastern and Pacific Time. Some weekend evening programs (such as Nuestra Belleza Latina) also utilize English captions, in addition to the native Spanish-language captions on the CC1 caption stream.

Prior to Univision adopting its English closed captioning, competing network Telemundo has carried English subtitles during its entire weeknight prime time schedule from September 8, 2003 to October 14, 2008, and again since March 30, 2009. Conversely, when the now-defunct Qubo Channel launched on January 8, 2007, most of its programming featured Spanish subtitles on the CC3 track in addition to the primary CC1 English captions.

Unlike the respective CC3 captions transmitted by Telemundo and Qubo Channel, Univision does not include these captions during most repeat broadcasts of telenovelas airing outside of the network's prime time schedule following the program's original run on the network.

=== Content editing ===
In 2004, Univision published a list of words it edited from programs broadcast by the network (mostly those acquired from Televisa and other distributors) to comply with broadcast decency standards set by the Federal Communications Commission. The words affected had no negative connotations in some Spanish-speaking countries, but had obscene connotations in other countries.

In June 2005, Grupo Televisa filed a lawsuit against Univision in a U.S. federal court, accusing the network of several actions, including "unauthorized editing" of Televisa programming. Since 2013, Univision has edited various telenovelas aired within its prime time schedule if a telenovela does not garner sufficient ratings; as such, scenes from a single program (such examples include Qué Bonito Amor ("Beautiful Love"), La Tempestad ("The Storm"), De Que te Quiero, te Quiero ("Head Over Heels") and La Malquerida ("The Unloved")) comprising 1½ to three episodes are sometimes removed and combined to fit into a one-hour timeslot. In 2015, the network implemented further content edits, removing scenes incorporating forms of physical violence or situations of a sexual nature or incorporating substance use involving minors on some of its telenovelas and anthology serials (such as La Rosa de Guadalupe and Como Dice el Dicho), regardless of the integrality of such depictions to the episode's plotline.

=== News programming ===
The network operates a news division, N+ Univision, which produces the network's flagship newscast Noticiero Univision, which airs in the form of two daily half-hour early and late evening broadcasts (the late-evening newscast formerly maintained a in-depth, investigative focused program Noticiero Univision Ultima Hora ("Noticiero Univision: Last Hour") from 2002 to 2008, under anchor Enrique Gratas, before reverting to the format of its early evening edition); it also produces the morning news and lifestyle program ¡Despierta América! ("Wake Up America!"), the late afternoon newsmagazine series Primer Impacto (which originally aired as a seven-day-a-week broadcast until 2007, and produces a condensed half-hour edition Primer Impacto Extra, which airs in place of late local newscasts on affiliates without their own news department or which choose to preempt regularly scheduled local newscasts on certain holidays) and the Sunday morning talk show Al Punto ("To the Point").

In 1987, Univision appointed Roberto FE Soto – a former producer at NBC News – to produce a revamped flagship evening newscast, Noticiero Univision, becoming the network's youngest executive; the network also reassigned Ramos and hired veteran journalist Maria Elena Salinas to co-anchor the evolving network newscast. Univision eventually decided to expand its news programming to afternoons; in 1992, the network debuted Noticias y Más ("News and More"), anchored by Nespral, Ambrosio Hernandez and Raúl Peimbert; Myrka Dellanos joined the program after Nespral's departure later that year. Hernandez and Peimbert left Univision in 1993 to join Telemundo, while Nespral became co-host of the weekend edition of NBC's Today. Univision had other plans for the moribund show: the network revamped its format, changed its name and its theme music, and hired Puerto Rican-born María Celeste Arrarás as a weekend reporter to serve as Dellanos' partner; the retooled newsmagazine series became Primer Impacto ("First Impact") in February 1994. For 14 years, from 1996 to 2009, John Lippman was Senior Vice President for News and Operations at Univision Television.

On April 14, 1997, Univision launched ¡Despierta América! as a Spanish-language competitor to NBC's Today, ABC's Good Morning America and CBS This Morning. The program – which originally ran for three hours, before expanding to four in 2013 – is known for coining the catch phrase, "échate pa' acá" ("Come here"), which is also the name of an entertainment segment focusing news and gossip about Latin entertainers. This format was later carried over to another show, Un Nuevo Día, when Telemundo retooled that program originally known as ¡Levantate! in 2013. ¡Despierta América! has since developed its own style of reporting news of various topics, such as immigration, sports, consumer, health, lifestyle, fashion, beauty and entertainment content.

Today, Univision's news programs typically outrank its Spanish-language competitors, with the early-evening edition of Noticiero Univision often placing ahead of its English-language rivals (NBC Nightly News, ABC World News Tonight and the CBS Evening News) among viewers in the 18–49 demographic. Most of Univision's owned-and-operated stations and affiliates produce their own local programming, usually in the form of local newscasts and public affairs programs. Newscasts aired on the network's stations are usually broadcast in early and late evening timeslots – with many non-O&Os not owned by Univision Communications and Entravision Communications airing them only on Monday through Fridays – although some O&Os and affiliates also air newscasts on weekday mornings and/or weekend evenings (with morning newscasts being limited mainly to the network's larger-market O&Os and affiliates).

In 2026, Univision fired Ambrosio Hernández, who hosted Noticias 23 and Al Punto Florida, as well as news director Yoly Zugasti as part of a wave of cuts at the company.

=== Sports ===
The network also maintains a sports division, Univision Deportes, which is responsible for the production of sports content on Univision, UniMás, Galavisión and its dedicated cable-satellite sports channel Univision Deportes Network. For the main Univision broadcast network, the division produces soccer matches from Liga MX (which have aired since 1987), select matches involving the Mexico and United States men's national teams, as well as tournament matches from the CONCACAF Gold Cup (the rights to which it assumed in 2000) and Copa América (which began airing in 1993). The network formerly held the Spanish language broadcast rights to the FIFA World Cup from 1970 until 2014 and the FIFA Women's World Cup from 1999 until 2011, with the rights migrating to Telemundo and NBC Universo beginning with the 2015 Women's World Cup.

In addition, the division also produces the weekly sports talk program República Deportiva, a Sunday daytime program that debuted in April 1999 with a companion late-night edition premiering in January 2015; and the weeknightly sports highlight/discussion program Contacto Deportivo ("Contact Sports"), which debuted in 2002 on what was then Telefutura, before moving to the main Univision network on March 2, 2015.

=== Children's programming ===
Children's programming has played a part in Univision's programming since its initial roots as the Spanish International Network. From 1962 until 2004, the bulk of SIN/Univision's children's programming was derived of mainly live-action and animated programming from Televisa and other content partners.

The network's first foray into children's programming, "Univision Infantiles", and featured Spanish-language dubs of the Japanese anime shows (Future Boy Conan and Voltron: Defender of the Universe). In June 1989, Univision launched a weekday and Saturday morning block, Univision y Los Niños, was in partnership of DIC Entertainment (Jayce and the Wheeled Warriors, Kidd Video, Rainbow Brite and The Adventures of Teddy Ruxpin). The block was discontinued in September 15, 1990, it was replaced with "Platavision", and it was carried with some DIC-produced shows. In 1991, Univision introduced "Chispavision", featuring the notable program was El Show de Xuxa ("The Xuxa Show"), a variety-based series starring the Southern Brazilian entertainer, which became a hit in the U.S. when it debuted on the network in 1992 (Xuxa would subsequently star in an American syndicated version of the program that aired for one season from 1993 to 1994).

In April 1995, Univision test-marketed Plaza Sésamo ("Sesame Plaza"), Televisa and Children's Television Workshop's (now Sesame Workshop) Spanish-language adaptation of Sesame Street featuring a mix of original segments featuring characters based on its U.S.-based parent series and dubbed interstitials from the aforementioned originating program, on its owned-and-operated stations in Los Angeles, Dallas and Miami. The success of the test run led the network to begin airing the program nationally beginning on December 11 of that year; the program aired on Univision until 2002, when it moved to its newly created sister network TeleFutura as part of its "Mi Tele" ("My TV") block (the Univision network resumed its relationship with the now-Sesame Workshop when it debuted the U.S.-based Spanish language spin-off Sesame Amigos ("Sesame Friends") in August 2015). The network aired its children's programs on weekday and Saturday mornings until April 1997, when Univision relegated its children's programming exclusively to Saturday mornings to make room for its new morning news/talk/lifestyle program ¡Despierta América!.

On March 30, 1996, after the children's block was hiatus since 1993, Univision debuted La Piñata Loca with the host by the comedian, George Ortuzar and entering into an agreement with Hanna-Barbera. A block featuring Spanish dubs of the animated series programming. The sub-block was launched within Saturday morning, "Giorgiomania" and featuring of the cartoon series, Cro (attempt with the based on "Sesame Street" was developed by Children's Television Workshop; now Sesame Workshop). The blocks were discontinued after February 27, 2000, when it was George "O" left Univision before the ending by the air, it was replaced with "¡De Cabeza!" debuted on October 7, 2000, which featured a mix of acquired programming from various provides, including Film Roman (Bruno the Kid and The Twisted Tales of Felix the Cat) and MB Producciones ("Mimi & Mr. Bobo") as well as some Japanese anime series such as Tenchi Universe and Lost Universe part of its inaugural lineup.

In 2003, Univision reduced the amount of children's programming on its schedule, reserving weekend morning and Saturday early afternoon timeslots for youth-oriented telenovelas. Following an agency investigation resulting from complaints by the United Church of Christ and the National Hispanic Media Coalition during license renewal proceedings for a Univision-owned television station in 2005, in February 2007, the FCC levied a $24 million fine – the largest single FCC fine filed against any corporation to that point – against the network's 24 owned-and-operated stations for circumventing federal guidelines requiring broadcast television stations and networks to air at least three hours of educational programming aimed at children by claiming the novelas (with the Televisa-produced Cómplices Al Rescate ("Friends to the Rescue") specifically cited as one example, due to the incorporation of occasional adult themes in some plotlines and complex subplots that were not suitable for younger children) as compliant educational programs in Children's Television Act filings for 116 weeks between 2004 and early 2006. The fine was paid as a component of a settlement that preceded the FCC's approval of Univision's acquisition by Broadcasting Media Partners Inc. to resolve then-pending license renewal applications for O&Os WQHS-TV in Cleveland and KDTV in San Francisco.

Through Univision's agreement to carry more programming that directly complies with the Children's Television Act's educational requirements in its payment of the fine, on March 3, 2008, the network launched a Saturday morning children's programming block, Planeta U ("Planet U"), consisting of Spanish-dubbed versions of American children's programs, with Dora the Explorer (which previously aired on competitor Telemundo via that network's "Nickelodeon en Telemundo" and "Telemundo Kids" blocks respectively), Go, Diego, Go!, Pinky Dinky Doo, Jakers! The Adventures of Piggley Winks, Inspector Gadget's Field Trip and Beakman's World as part of its inaugural lineup.

Before Walt Disney Television entered into an agreement with Univision, a sub-block during the first two hours of the block, "Disney Junior en Univision", debuted within "Planeta U" on June 28, 2014, featuring dubbed versions of Disney Junior original series (with Mickey Mouse Clubhouse and Handy Manny as the first to air as part of the sub-block; the latter's dub incorporates basic instruction in English words and phrases instead of those in Spanish, as the English version features).

=== Specials ===
Univision broadcasts several annual specials, including rights to several major Latin American award shows; through its programming agreement with Televisa, the network has held the U.S. broadcast rights to Premios TVyNovelas, a co-production of Televisa and the television publication TVyNovelas that honors the year's Mexican television programs, including telenovelas, since 1983. The 2013 telecast on April 28 of that year was the first to air simultaneously on Univision and the program's originating broadcaster in Mexico, Canal de las Estrellas.

Since 1989, the network has served as the broadcaster of Premio Lo Nuestro ("Our Thing Awards"), an awards show established by the network to honor the previous year's top artists in Latin music, with nominees initially selected by Univision and Billboard and winners decided by viewers (after Billboard created its own Latin Awards ceremony in 1994, the nominees and winners were selected by a poll conducted among program directors of Spanish-language radio stations throughout the United States, with results were tabulated and certified by Arthur Andersen).

In 2004, the network launched Premios Juventud ("Youthfulness Awards"), a viewer-decided awards show (similar in format and identical in target audience to the Teen Choice Awards) honoring Hispanics and Latinos in film, music, sports, fashion and pop culture. On August 24, 2005, Univision acquired the rights to broadcast the Latin Grammy Awards (which aired on the network for the first time exclusively in Spanish on November 3 of that year), after organizers with the Latin Recording Academy chose to end its four-year relationship with CBS (having canceled the 2001 broadcast following the September 11 attacks) were rebuffed by executives with that network in efforts to retool the show to better cater to a Hispanic audience; the Latin Recording Academy extended its agreement with Univision to televise the Latin Grammys for six years on June 26, 2012.

On October 1, 2012, Univision and Fundación Teletón announced the creation of Fundación Teletón USA, a foundation to benefit rehabilitation centers specializing in research and medical treatment of children with disabilities, cancer and autism around the United States. The partnership resulted in the development of Teletón USA, a 28-hour telethon based on the televised benefit created by Don Francisco – who has hosted the U.S. version since its inception – that originated in Chile in 1978, which was modeled after the now-discontinued telethons benefitting the Muscular Dystrophy Association that were started by Jerry Lewis. The first event on December 14 and 15, 2012 – which was watched by a cumulative 13.9 million viewers through its simulcast on Univision and co-owned radio network Univision America, and via live streaming on Univision.com and the UVideos platforms – raised US$8,150,625 (exceeding its initial goal of US$7 million).

Univision also broadcasts an annual New Year's Eve special, ¡Feliz!, as well as Spanish-language coverage of the Rose Parade.

From 1974 until 2000, SIN first and Univision later, took part in the annual Ibero-American OTI Festival for twenty-six editions representing the United States. Starting in 1978, the network organized a large-scale televised national competition to select its entry to the international festival, with many of its affiliates organizing local televised competitions to select their entries to the national final. SIN also staged the 12th edition of the OTI Festival at the DAR Constitution Hall in Washington, D.C. on 29 October 1983; with Univision staging the 18th edition at the James L. Knight Center in Miami on 18 November 1989, and the 19th edition at the Circus Maximus of the Caesars Palace in Las Vegas on 1 December 1990. SIN won the competition in 1986 with "Todos", written by Vilma Planas and performed by Dámaris Carbaugh, Miguel Ángel Guerra, and Eduardo Fabián; and Univision won the competition in 2000 with "Hierba mala", written by Angie Chirino, Olga María Chirino, and Emilio Estefan and performed by Hermanas Chirino.

== Stations ==
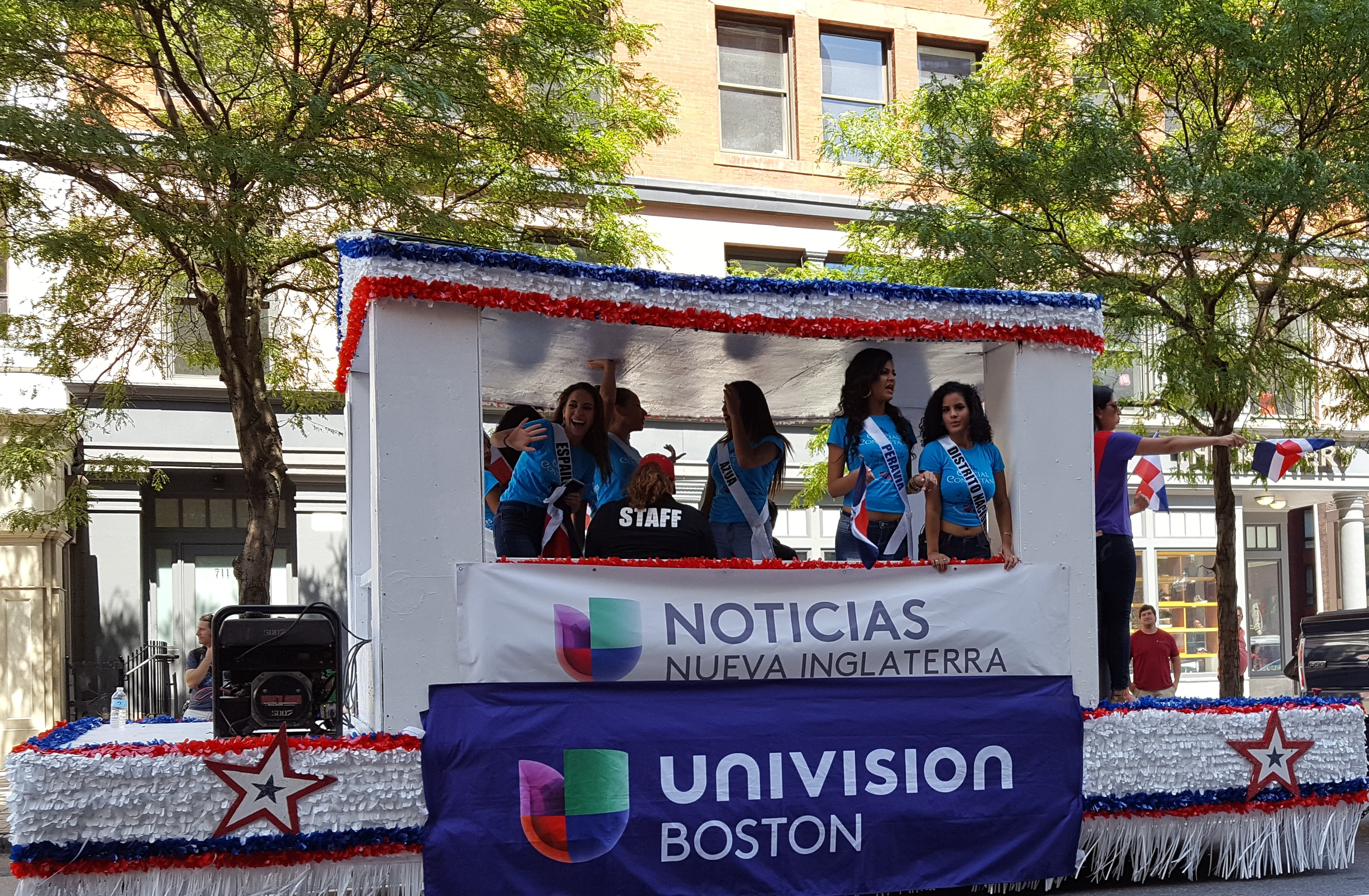
A WUNI float at Boston's Dominican Parade in 2016.

As of June 2018, Univision has 27 owned-and-operated stations, and current and pending affiliation agreements with 37 additional television stations, encompassing 25 states, the District of Columbia and the U.S. possession of Puerto Rico. The network has an estimated national reach of 58.35% of all households in the United States (or 182,330,440 Americans with at least one television set), making Univision the largest American Spanish broadcast television network by population reach percentage. Univision maintains affiliations with low-power stations (broadcasting either in analog or digital) in several markets, including a few larger markets such as San Diego (KBNT-CD and its repeater KHAX-LD), Minneapolis−St. Paul (WUMN-LD), and Kansas City (KUKC-LD). In certain other markets, these low-power affiliates also maintain digital simulcasts on a subchannel of a co-owned/co-managed full-power television station.

Currently outside of Univision's core O&O group, Entravision Communications is the network's largest affiliate operator by numerical total and market reach, owning or providing services to 13 primary affiliates of the network (including a station in one top-ten market Boston. In other areas of the U.S., Univision provides a national cable network feed that is distributed directly to cable, satellite and IPTV providers as an alternative method of distribution in markets without either the availability or the demand for a locally based owned-and-operated or affiliate station.

== Related services ==
=== Current sister channels ===
==== UniMás ====
UniMás is a companion Spanish-language broadcast television network that is owned by Univision Communications, which originally launched on January 14, 2002, as TeleFutura; the network adopted its current name on January 7, 2013. The network features programming aimed at young males between the ages of 18 and 35, featuring a mix of telenovelas, soccer, baseball, billiards and boxing events, reruns of classic novelas and comedy series and feature films (primarily Spanish-dubbed versions of American films) and beauty pageant events. As Telefutura, the network carried a similar programming format, including telenovelas produced by Televisa, Coral Productions, Venevision, RCTV, RCN and Rede Globo.

==== Galavisión ====
Galavisión is a cable and satellite network that originally launched on April 2, 1979, as a premium channel that carried classic and recent Spanish-language films (primarily those produced in Mexico) as well as Spanish-dubbed versions of recent American-produced films. The network converted into a general entertainment basic cable channel in 1984, offering programming sourced from Televisa (some of which originally aired on the then-Spanish International Network, and are now sourced from Televisa's Mexican-based networks Canal de las Estrellas, FOROtv, Gala TV and TeleHit) and SIN. During the mid-1990s, Galavisión incorporated some English-language programs to its lineup, as well as select news programs from the Televisa-owned cable news channel ECO. The network airs a mix of telenovelas and comedy series, as well as news, sports and specials originating from the Televisa networks. Other than the fact that both networks carry Televisa-produced programs, Galavisión is not related to Mexico-based Gala TV, which formerly went by the same name as the U.S. channel until 2014.

==== TUDN ====
TUDN is a sports channel operated in partnership between Univision and Televisa; it originally launched in 2012 as the Univision Deportes Network (UDN), serving as an overflow channel for Univision's existing sports rights (including Liga MX and the UEFA Champions League), as well as carrying programming sub-licensed from Televisa Deportes Network. In 2019, both services re-launched as the joint venture TUDN (referring to "Televisa Univision Deportes Network", but with the first two letters pronounced as the pronoun "tu"), signifying a larger degree of collaboration between the two services for studio programming and shared event rights. Univision Deportes Network officially rebranded as TUDN on July 20, 2019.

==== Fusion TV ====
Fusion TV is an American pay television news and satire channel owned by Fusion Media Group, a multi-platform media company owned by Univision Communications, which relies in part on the resources of its parent company's news division, Noticias Univision. In addition to conventional television distribution, Fusion is streamed online and on mobile platforms to subscribers of participating cable and satellite providers.

==== Univision tlnovelas ====
Univision tlnovelas is a digital cable and satellite network that launched on March 1, 2012. The channel carries a mix of first-run and repeat broadcasts of telenovelas sourced from Televisa's program library, in El Canal y las Estrellas, including those that were never previously aired in the United States, as well as content produced by Univision.

=== Video-on-demand services ===
Univision provides video on demand access for delayed viewing of full episodes of the network's programming through various means, including its TV Everywhere service UVideos, a traditional VOD service – called Univision on Demand – which is carried on most traditional cable and IPTV providers, and through content deals with Hulu and iTunes. and Verizon's go90 platform. Due to restrictions imposed on the streaming service by Univision Communications, Hulu limits day-after-air streaming of newer episodes of Univision's programs to subscribers of its subscription service until eight days after their initial broadcast, in order to encourage live or same-week (via both DVR and cable on demand) viewing. Like the video-on-demand television services provided by the other U.S. broadcast networks, Univision on Demand disables fast forwarding for content provided through the service.

==== UVideos ====
On October 29, 2012, Univision launched UVideos, a multi-platform streaming service – which incorporates a user interface accessible to and advertising aimed at both Spanish and English speakers – that originally encompassed a dedicated website at UVideos.com and a mobile app for smartphones and tablet computers supporting the Apple iOS and Android platforms (with programs streamable over 3G and WiFi networks). The service provides full-length episodes of Univision programs (including those produced by Televisa) as well as programs aired on sister networks UniMás and Galavisión, with the most recent episodes usually being made available for streaming on the service (as well as Univision on Demand) the day after their original broadcast to subscribers of participating pay television providers (such as Comcast, Verizon FiOS and Time Warner Cable) using an ISP account via an authenticated user login. The service also includes select original digital content, user-enabled English subtitling for most programs (except for excerpts from Noticiero Univision broadcasts) as well as a social stream featuring viewer comments from the UVideos and other social media platforms, which are time-synched to the user's local time zone to mimic a live relay to the user as posted during the program's original broadcast.

==== Univision NOW ====
On November 18, 2015, Univision launched Univision NOW, an over-the-top subscription video on demand streaming service, which features program content from both Univision and UniMás. Designed as a standalone offering that does not require an existing pay television subscription in order to access, the service is initially available via a dedicated website (univisionnow.com), as well as apps for iOS and Android devices. Available for subscription rates of either $5.99 per month or $59.99 per year, although prospective users can access content through a seven-day free trial, It can also be accessed by using a television provider. Univision NOW is identical to UVideos in terms of content and features, offering a catalog of telenovelas, news programming, reality series, awards shows and archived football matches (due to content restrictions imposed upon by Univision's content distributors, some entertainment programming seen on Univision and UniMás is not available on the service, and is not available for purchase in Puerto Rico, despite Univision's ownership of WLII-DT in the territory).

New episodes of prime time series aired on Univision and UniMás – both original content and programs from their distribution partners – are made available for streaming the day after their broadcast on the two linear television networks and are accessible for seven days following their airdate. In addition to providing full-length episodes of Univision and UniMás programs, the service allows live programming streams from both networks and newscast streams from local Univision owned-and-operated stations in certain markets (with its stations in New York City, Los Angeles and Houston initially being available); the live streams include a DVR-style "rewind" feature that allows users to replay programming from those streams up to 72 hours after their broadcast as well as push notifications to notify subscribers when live breaking news coverage is available. In November 2016 it began adding exclusive content, using the name Univision NOW Originals, with most exclusive content being telenovelas that have not aired on the Univision or UniMas channels, including Sin rastro de ti, Corazón que miente, and most recently, Las amazonas.

=== Univision HD ===
Univision's master feed is transmitted in 1080i high definition, the native resolution format for Univision Communications' network television properties. However, three Univision-affiliated stations transmit the network feed in 480i standard definition; two of the stations (Fort Myers affiliate WLZE-LD and Nashville affiliate WLLC-LD) are primary feed Univision affiliates that have not yet made technical upgrades to their transmission equipment to allow content to be presented in HD, while the third (Hartford affiliate WUVN) runs a standard-definition simulcast of its main HD feed on a digital subchannel.

Univision launched its high definition simulcast feed at 12:02 a.m. Eastern and Pacific Time on New Year's Day, January 1, 2010, on its East and West Coast flagship stations in New York City and Los Angeles, WXTV-DT and KMEX-DT. The first Univision program to be televised in high definition was that day's broadcast of the Tournament of Roses Parade. On January 18, 2010, Univision debuted the first telenovela to be broadcast in HD on the network, Hasta que el Dinero nos Separe ("Until Money Do Us Part"); the telenovelas Un Gancho Al Corazón ("A Hook to the Heart") and Sortilegio ("Love Spell") also began airing in high definition on that date. The network's coverage of the 2010 FIFA World Cup became the first sports event on Univision to be broadcast in HD.

Most of the network's programming is presented in HD As of October 2015 (including most telenovelas; sports programs, including football events and the sports analysis/variety program Republica Deportiva; news programs Noticiero Univision, Primer Impacto, ¡Despierta América!, El Gorda y La Flaca and Al Punto; variety series such as Nuestra Belleza Latina, La Banda and Sabadazo; and select movies) is broadcast by the network in high definition; exceptions exist with certain telenovelas, sitcoms and variety series as well as select children's programs aired as part of the "Planeta U" block produced prior to 2008 that air in reruns, which continue to be presented in their native 4:3 standard definition format. DirecTV added the East Coast HD feed on April 28, 2010. Dish Network added the HD feed on May 12, 2010.

Univision did not fully broadcast in a 16:9 presentation (except for Noticiero Univision: Edición Digital where it is resented in a 16:9 format, select programs such as Vino el amor, and most sporting events by both of the networks although Univision's (and Unimás's) on screen on screen graphics remains orientated in mixed 4:3 and 16:9 presentation for some of its on-screen graphics) until October 1, 2018, when it and UniMás repositioned their on-screen graphics into a 16:9-orientation.

With the deployment of ATSC 3.0, some Univision stations began broadcasting at 1080p such as WUVC-DT in Fayetteville, North Carolina, which broadcasts at 1080p through WRDC in Durham, North Carolina and KSTR-DT in Irving, Texas, which is an UniMás station that simulcasts its sister station, KUVN-DT at 1080p.

=== Other channels distributed by Univision ===
Univision distributes several of Televisa's domestic Mexican broadcast and cable networks in the United States via cable, IPTV and satellite as part of 'Spanish' or 'Latino' tiers requiring additional fees, with American advertising, promotional ads and public service announcements overlaid by Univision.

- Bandamax - Banda, Norteño and Regional Mexican music videos
- De Película - Modern-day Mexican films
- De Película Clásico - Classic Mexican films
- FOROtv - Noticieros Televisa rolling news programming
- RMS - Modern music videos
- TeleHit - Modern pop/rap music videos and comedy programming

=== Univision America ===
Univision America is a Spanish-language talk radio network that is distributed by Univision parent Univision Communications, which was launched on July 4, 2012, with affiliations with nine AM radio stations in Los Angeles, San Francisco and San Diego, California; Dallas and Houston, Texas; Chicago, Illinois, Las Vegas, Nevada; and Orlando and Miami, Florida. The network features talk shows focusing on issues of importance to Hispanic and Latino Americans, and produces features hourly national and international news updates. As of October 2015, Univision America has ten affiliates, all or which are owned by Univision Communications' radio division Univision Radio; it is also distributed nationwide to other areas without a local affiliate via iHeartRadio.

== International broadcasts ==
=== Mexico ===
Univision programming is available in Mexico through affiliates in markets located within proximity to the Mexico–United States border (such as KBNT-CD/San Diego (and repeater KHAX-LD); KUVE-DT/Tucson, Arizona; KINT-TV/El Paso, KLDO-TV/Laredo and KNVO/McAllen), whose signals are readily receivable over-the-air in border areas of northern Mexico. Some U.S.-based border affiliates are also available on subscription television providers throughout the country, including in the Mexico City area include WLTV of Miami, WXTV of the New York City and KMEX of Los Angeles.

=== Canada ===
The U.S.-based Univision network maintains a very limited over-the-air presence in Canada outside of Seattle affiliate KVOS, within parts of the Vancouver market, and Cleveland owned-and-operated station WQHS-DT, within areas within the London, Ontario, market.

On January 28, 2014, Toronto-based Corus Entertainment announced that it would relaunch its cable and satellite specialty channel TLN en Español (a Spanish-language spinoff of Telelatino, which launched on October 23, 2007, and already carried select programs broadcast by Univision through separate programming agreements) as a Canadian version of Univision through a brand licensing agreement with the U.S. network's parent, Univision Communications; the network was relaunched as Univision Canada on May 5, 2014.

=== Caribbean ===
In the Caribbean, Univision is broadcast on affiliated station WLII-DT in Caguas-San Juan and satellite stations WSUR-DT in Ponce and WOLE-DT in Aguadilla; these stations are owned by Liberman Media Group and broadcast under the TeleOnce branding. These stations, which were owned by Univision from 2005 to 2020, do not carry the complete main Univision programming schedule as seen in the United States mainland, offering a mix of programs seen on the main network feed (with some programs airing at different times than in the continental U.S.). In addition, Univision programming is available on many cable and satellite providers in other parts of the Caribbean via either Miami owned-and-operated station WLTV or WLII.

== Carriage disputes ==
Univision, UniMás, Galavisión, Univision Deportes Network and Univision tlnovelas were dropped by AT&T U-verse on March 4, 2016, because of a carriage dispute. Although AT&T also has DirecTV as a subsidiary of AT&T, along with U-Verse, despite being in the process to integrate with DirecTV and U-Verse, DirecTV customers were not affected, as they were taken in a different deal, which had been agreed to before the dispute ever occurred. All of Univision's channels and cable networks were later returned to the U-verse lineup on March 24, 2016.

On January 27, 2017, Charter Spectrum (along with Time Warner Cable and Bright House, which merged with Charter Communications in 2016) faced another dispute with Univision, warning Charter Communications that Univision could be removed from Charter by January 31, 2017. Prior to then, Univision sued Charter over pay carriage rates at the New York Supreme Court in July 2016. On January 31, 2017, Charter customers lost access to all of Univision's channels, including UniMás, UDN, and Galavisión (including access to its Owned-and-Operated Stations via Charter). On February 2, the New York Superior Court ordered Univision to end the blackout on Charter as negotiations continue. This blackout affects all Univision affiliates, even if Univision does not own them, so this dispute includes all stations owned by Entravision Communications, even if Entravision was not involved in the dispute.

On October 16, 2017, at around 5 PM EDT, Verizon FiOS, without any warning, pulled Univision, along with UniMás, UDN, and Galavisión despite the extension of an agreement arranged by the two. It also caused FOROtv to be removed during the dispute as well, despite not being owned by Univision.

On Sunday, July 1, 2018, Univision entered into a dispute with Dish Network and Sling TV. Dish and Sling subscribers lost access to Univision and UniMás east and west channels, affiliated stations, Galavision, Univision Deportes Network, ForoTV news channel and Univisíon tlnovelas channel. Many subscribers cancelled their subscription to Dish or Sling and switched to DirecTV, other streaming TV service, or to a cable provider that offered the Univision-owned channels. On April 1, 2019, a new agreement was reached between Univision Communications and Dish, restoring the channels that had been removed from the lineup, This does not affect Sling TV subscribers.

== See also ==
- List of Spanish-language television networks in the United States
- List of United States television networks
- Telemundo
