= KXTN (AM) =

Radio station in San Antonio, Texas

- San Antonio, Texas; United States
- Broadcast area: Greater San Antonio
- Frequency: 1350 kHz
- Branding: KXTN 1350 AM Tejano & Proud

Programming
- Languages: Spanish & English
- Format: Tejano
- Affiliations: San Antonio Spurs (Spanish)

Ownership
- Owner: Latino Media Network; (Latino Media Network, LLC)

History
- First air date: 1946
- Former call signs: KCOR (1946–2014; 2015–2019); KXTN (2014–2015)
- Call sign meaning: "Tejano"

Technical information
- Licensing authority: FCC
- Facility ID: 67069
- Class: B
- Power: 5,000 watts
- Transmitter coordinates: 29°31′27.8″N 98°37′6.1″W
- Repeater: 96.1 KBTQ-HD2 (Harlingen)

Links
- Public license information: Public file; LMS
- Webcast: Listen live (via iHeartRadio)
- Website: www.iheart.com/live/kxtn-1350-am-tejano-5205

KXTN (1350 kHz) is a commercial AM radio station broadcasting a Tejano radio format. Licensed to San Antonio, Texas, United States, the station serves the San Antonio metropolitan area. The station is owned and operated by Latino Media Network, under the license of Latino Media Network, LLC. Its transmitter are located separately in Northwest San Antonio.

== History ==
KCOR first signed on in 1946 as a 1,000-watt daytimer, owned by Raoul A. Cortez. The original call sign contained the first three letters of his last name. The station has been mostly Hispanic-owned and programmed through its seven-plus decades on the air, airing Tejano and Regional Mexican music.

In 2003, the station was acquired by Univision Radio, a subsidiary of the top Spanish-language television network in the United States, Univision. Univision later switched the format to Spanish-language talk, mostly from its own radio network.

On December 20, 2016, Univision announced that KCOR would be one of the charter affiliates of the company's new Spanish-language sports network, Univision Deportes Radio. The launch occurred in March 2017. From 2014 to 2015, the station had been simulcasting the Tejano music format of co-owned KXTN-FM and used the KXTN call sign. With the switch to sports, the call sign returned to KCOR.

In April 2019, KCOR dropped its longtime call sign, as well as the Univision Deportes Network, beginning a simulcast with Tejano sister station KXTN-FM, becoming KXTN in the process. On April 12, 2019, at 5:00 p.m., the two stations ended their simulcast, leaving the Tejano format solely on AM 1350 and on an HD Radio subchannel of 107.5, now known as KVBH-HD2. The FM station switched its call sign to KVBH, airing a Rhythmic AC format.

On June 3, 2022, Univision announced it would sell a package of 18 radio stations across 10 of its markets, primarily AM outlets in large cities (including KXTN) and entire clusters in smaller markets such as McAllen, Texas, and Fresno, California, for $60 million to a new company known as Latino Media Network (LMN); Univision proposed to handle operations for a year under agreement before turning over operational control to LMN in the fourth quarter of 2023. The sale was consummated on December 30, 2022.

Latino Media Network took control of operations of KXTN at the end of September 2023.
