= KMYS =

Television station in Kerrville, Texas

ATSC 3.0 station
- Kerrville–San Antonio, Texas; United States
- City: Kerrville, Texas
- Channels: Digital: 32 (UHF); Virtual: 35

Programming
- Affiliations: 35.1: Roar; 35.2/.3: The Nest

Ownership
- Owner: Deerfield Media; (Deerfield Media (San Antonio) Licensee, LLC)
- Operator: Sinclair Broadcast Group
- Sister stations: KABB, WOAI-TV

History
- First air date: November 6, 1985
- Former call signs: KRRT (1985–2006)
- Former channel number: Analog: 35 (UHF, 1985–2009)
- Former affiliations: Independent (1985–1986); Fox (1986–1995); UPN (1995–1998); The WB (1998–2006); FoxBox/4KidsTV (secondary, 2002–2008); MyNetworkTV (2006–2010); The CW (2010–2021); Dabl (2021–2025)
- Call sign meaning: "MyNetworkTV San Antonio" (former affiliation)

Technical information
- Licensing authority: FCC
- Facility ID: 51518
- ERP: 1,000 kW
- HAAT: 530.8 m (1,741 ft)
- Transmitter coordinates: 29°36′38″N 98°53′33″W

Links
- Public license information: Public file; LMS

KMYS (channel 35) is a television station licensed to Kerrville, Texas, United States, serving the San Antonio area with programming from the digital multicast network Roar. It is owned by Deerfield Media and operated by Sinclair Broadcast Group alongside NBC/CW affiliate WOAI-TV (channel 4) and Fox affiliate KABB (channel 29). The three stations share studios between Babcock Road and Sovereign Drive (off Loop 410) in northwest San Antonio, with administrative offices in an adjacent building west across its parking lot; KMYS's transmitter is located in rural southeastern Bandera County, near Lakehills.

Channel 35 began broadcasting in November 1985 as KRRT, the first independent station serving San Antonio and the first new commercial TV station in the San Antonio market in 28 years. It was owned in part, and eventually entirely, by TVX Broadcast Group, a Virginia-based group of independent stations. KRRT served as San Antonio's first affiliate of Fox when the network launched in 1986. TVX was acquired by Paramount Pictures in two stages between 1989 and 1991.

The Paramount Stations Group sold KRRT in 1994 to Jet Broadcasting of Erie, Pennsylvania. Jet then contracted with River City Broadcasting, owner of KABB, to run the station. The Fox affiliation moved to KABB, which was starting a news department; KRRT then became a UPN affiliate, and it also inherited San Antonio Spurs telecasts from KABB. After River City merged into Sinclair in 1996, KABB and other Sinclair-owned UPN stations switched to The WB in a major group deal that took effect in January 1998. KRRT became KMYS, an affiliate of MyNetworkTV, in 2006; it then became the CW affiliate in 2010, replacing KCWX. In September 2021, the programming that had been airing on KMYS, along with its "CW 35" branding, moved to a subchannel of WOAI-TV; KMYS itself began exclusively airing diginets ahead of conversion to ATSC 3.0.

== History ==
=== Early years ===
In December 1980, Hubbard Broadcasting petitioned the Federal Communications Commission (FCC) to add channel 35 to its table of allotments at Kerrville. The commission made the assignment effective January 1982, and three applications were received from Commanche Broadcasting; Hispanic American Broadcasting; and Tierra del Sol Broadcasting Corporation, owner of the recently built KVEO-TV in Brownsville. The commission selected Hispanic American Broadcasting—whose primary owner was communications attorney Raul Robert Tapia—over Commanche Broadcasting, a decision affirmed by the FCC's review board in 1984.

Tapia changed the name of his company to Republic Communications Corporation, for the Republic of Texas, and began building the station as KRRT (for his initials). He sold 49 percent to TVX Broadcast Group, a Virginia-based chain of independent stations, with TVX holding an option to acquire another 31 percent. The station went on the air from studios in San Antonio—located along Loop 410, near Ingram Park Mall, on the northwest side of the city—and a 473.3-meter (1,553 ft) tower near Medina Lake. It was the San Antonio area's first independent station and first new station since KONO-TV (channel 12, now KSAT-TV) signed on in January 1957; it had been the largest city in the country without one, and the only similar outlet was the KENS II cable service. The only UHF station in the market prior to KRRT was Spanish-language KWEX-TV.

The station began broadcasting on November 6, 1985. It affiliated with Fox upon its launch in October 1986; the next month, TVX exercised its option to increase its holdings in KRRT to 80 percent. In 1987, San Antonio got a second independent when KABB began broadcasting on channel 29.

At the same time that TVX was increasing its ownership interest in KRRT, it was also purchasing five independent stations in markets much larger than San Antonio from Taft Broadcasting. The Taft stations purchase left TVX highly leveraged and highly vulnerable. TVX's bankers, Salomon Brothers, provided the financing for the acquisition and in return held more than 60 percent of the company. The company was to pay Salomon Brothers $200 million on January 1, 1988, and missed the first payment deadline, having been unable to lure investors to its junk bonds even before Black Monday. While TVX recapitalized by the end of 1988, Salomon Brothers reached an agreement in principle in January 1989 for Paramount Pictures to acquire options to purchase the investment firm's majority stake. This deal was replaced in September with an outright purchase of 79 percent of TVX for $110 million. That year, TVX attempted to sell KRRT. In 1991, Paramount acquired the remainder of TVX, forming the Paramount Stations Group.

=== Attempts at launching a newscast ===
While KRRT never carried a newscast as a Fox affiliate, station management proposed starting a news operation on three separate occasions within the span of two years. Then-general manager Morrie Beitch proposed a 9-minute local news segment to launch January 1, 1991. The planned segment would cut in to a national newscast being planned by Fox at the time, which ultimately did not launch.

In September 1991, KRRT attempted again to establish an in-house news department. This time, Beitch proposed a 30-minute 9 p.m. newscast, which would be San Antonio's first had it debuted. Management targeted April 1992 as the debut for the newscast. Paramount budgeted over $1 million for the endeavor, which would include a new studio, news vans and cameras, and the hiring of 14–16 staffers. KRRT did not plan to poach talent from the existing stations in the market, with Beitch telling the San Antonio Light, "we're not going to try to lure Chris Marrou away (from KENS-TV)". Beitch added that the news presentation would be "very direct" and that it was "not going to be glitzy". Beitch departed the station shortly thereafter, returning to WLMT in Memphis to work for former TVX executives, and the news operation did not launch.

KRRT made a third attempt to start a newscast in February 1992. Newly appointed general manager Walt DeHaven (who transferred from sister station WTXF-TV in Philadelphia) said there was a "better than 50–50 chance" KRRT would enter the local news race. This time, management was angling for a launch in March 1993. Paramount budgeted $2.5 million to construct a new studio, purchase equipment, and hire 40 staffers. Changing budgetary priorities at Paramount pushed the projected introduction of such a newscast back, first to 1993 and then 1994.

=== From Fox to UPN ===
In November 1993, Broadcasting & Cable magazine reported that River City Broadcasting was close to buying KRRT, even though it had owned KABB since 1989. Reports circulated that such a deal would include affiliation with the new UPN network, then in the early formative stages, for its non-Fox independent stations. Though KABB secured the UPN affiliation as part of a group deal with River City, and Baker had told Variety that River City had been interested in a second San Antonio station since 1992, nothing came of this, in part because River City realized that changes to media ownership rules would come too late to permit River City to exercise its option to purchase KRRT in a timely manner. However, after Fox acquired the rights to NFL football in 1994, the station set up a new half-hour sports show, 35 Sports Street, hosted by KTSA radio personalities Mark Allen and Russell Scott.

In August 1994, Paramount sold KRRT and WLFL in Raleigh, North Carolina. The buyer for KRRT was a group owned by Myron Jones and John Kanzius; Jones and Kanzius were involved with Jet Broadcasting, owner of WJET-TV in Erie, Pennsylvania, and River City principal Barry Baker had gotten to know them at industry meetings. The concept of KABB assuming KRRT's operations under a local marketing agreement surfaced again in November 1994, this time with the Fox affiliation moving from channel 35 to channel 29.

Because of objections placed by San Antonio network affiliates KENS and KSAT, no sale had yet been approved by the FCC when Fox announced on January 4, 1995, that its affiliation would move to KABB on January 16. KABB had higher ratings; an impending 9 p.m. newscast, slated to launch that March; and a tower site at Elmendorf, from which other San Antonio-area TV stations (but not channel 35) are broadcast. That same day, UPN programming launched on KRRT instead of KABB. The deal was approved by the FCC and closed in midsummer; it allowed KABB to immediately expand the new 30-minute newscast to an hour, among other improvements. KRRT assumed broadcasts of games of the San Antonio Spurs from KABB in the 1996–97 season, freeing up channel 29 to preempt fewer Fox network programs.

River City sold its assets to Sinclair Broadcast Group in 1996. As Sinclair planned the various applications to conduct the River City merger, Jet Broadcasting sold the assets of KRRT to Sinclair and the license to Glencairn, Ltd.—97 percent of which was owned by Carolyn Smith, the mother of the controllers of Sinclair. The use of Glencairn as a licensee for stations to be managed by Sinclair in San Antonio; Columbus, Ohio; and Anderson, South Carolina, generated scrutiny and concerns as to whether a then-illegal duopoly was being constituted. The Rainbow/PUSH Coalition, headed by Jesse Jackson, announced in 1998 its plans to study the KABB–KRRT relationship in San Antonio, wanting to examine whether the latter station "[has] any meaningful corporate personality of its own". In March 1999, the FCC responded by asking Glencairn to amend its local marketing agreements so as to strip Sinclair of final decision-making authority as to programming.

=== WB affiliation ===
On July 21, 1997, Sinclair signed an affiliation agreement with The WB to switch the affiliations of KRRT and four other UPN affiliates to the network. San Antonio had previously not had a dedicated WB affiliate. The affiliation change took place on January 16, 1998; UPN programs resurfaced the next month in overnight hours on KMOL-TV, which was owned by UPN half-owner United Television, and later in the year on a translator of KTRG-TV in Del Rio. Also in 1998, KRRT began airing its first local news program: the WB 35 News at 5:30, a half-hour program produced and anchored by the KABB news team competing with national network newscasts.

KRRT continued to split half of the over-the-air rights to the Spurs until 2000, when a new UPN affiliate debuted in the market and initially took the Spurs with it. That station, KBEJ (channel 2), was managed by KENS. The Spurs' move from channel 35 to channel 2 lasted one season. Like KRRT itself, the transmitter was located to the northwest of San Antonio, not the south, and some NBA fans on the south side of San Antonio complained of poor reception of the new station. Average ratings for the Spurs fell from an 8.5 on KRRT in the 1999–2000 season to a 5.5 on KBEJ through February 2001. Before the 2001–2002 season, the Spurs moved back to KRRT, even though KBEJ had held a multi-year contract for the games; channel 35 then added eight games a season of the San Antonio Silver Stars women's basketball team between 2003 and 2007.

Sinclair filed to purchase KRRT outright in November 1999, upon the legalization of duopolies. However, it was not able to do so until December 2001, at which time Sinclair was fined $40,000 by the FCC for illegally controlling Glencairn.

=== Switch to MyNetworkTV ===
"My35" logo used by the station until the station ended its affiliation in August 2010.

In 2006, The WB and UPN were shut down and replaced with The CW, which offered programming from both predecessor networks. However, Sinclair was late to sign an agreement with The CW. The news of the merger resulted in Sinclair announcing in early March that 17 of its UPN and WB affiliates, including KRRT, would join MyNetworkTV, a new service formed by the News Corporation, which was also owner of the Fox network. On March 28, KBEJ signed with The CW. In June, KRRT became KMYS, reflecting its new affiliation. Four years later, however, Sinclair signed an affiliation agreement with The CW, and on August 30, 2010, CW programming moved to KMYS from KCWX.

As a MyNetworkTV and CW station, KMYS established a franchise of weekly high school football telecasts on Thursday nights in the fall, following in the footsteps of Sinclair stations in Nashville, Tennessee, and Birmingham, Alabama. Not all local school districts—notably the North East Independent School District and Northside Independent School District—were open to participating to avoid creating additional Thursday night games on short turnarounds. Meanwhile, the number of Spurs games aired on the station declined. In 2006–07, KMYS aired 31 games compared to 32 on Fox Sports Southwest and 10 on KENS. However, by 2009–10, KMYS and KENS were left to split 23 games among themselves as the cable channel aired 50. The station aired two games in 2016–17 and four in 2018–19.

On July 19, 2012, Sinclair announced that it would sell the license assets of KMYS to Deerfield Media (a similarly situated affiliate of Sinclair as Cunningham Broadcasting, the former Glencairn) to comply with FCC duopoly regulations following its purchase of WOAI-TV from Newport Television. Sinclair was able to own WOAI and KABB outright together, as KABB was the fifth-ranked station in total-day ratings. The transactions were completed on December 3, 2012; Sinclair retained control of KMYS's operations through joint sales and shared services agreements. Despite being commonly owned, operations of WOAI and KABB–KMYS were not consolidated in one facility until 2014.

=== Shift of The CW to a WOAI subchannel ===
On September 20, 2021, The CW affiliation and other programs aired on the main KMYS subchannel moved to the 4.2 subchannel of WOAI-TV, still known as "CW 35". The primary subchannel then began broadcasting Dabl, a digital multicast network, in advance of the station's 2022 conversion to ATSC 3.0 format.

On August 4, 2025, the station flipped to Roar.

== Technical information ==
=== Subchannels ===
The station's ATSC 1.0 channels are carried on the multiplexed signals of other San Antonio television stations:

Subchannels provided by KMYS (ATSC 1.0)
Subchannel	Res.	Short name	Programming	ATSC 1.0 host
35.1	720p	ROAR	Roar	KCWX
35.2	480i	TheNest	The Nest	KABB
35.3	720p	TheNest	The Nest	KABB

In exchange, from its transmitter in southeastern Bandera County near Lakehills, KMYS broadcasts KCWX and the Sinclair stations in 3.0 format:

Subchannels of KMYS (ATSC 3.0)
Subchannel	Short name	Programming
2.1	KCWX	MyNetworkTV (KCWX)
4.1	WOAI	NBC (WOAI-TV)
29.1	KABB	Fox (KABB)
29.10	T2	T2 (from Tennis Channel)
29.11	PBTV	Pickleballtv
35.1	ROAR	Roar

Subchannel streamed via the Internet

=== Analog-to-digital conversion ===
KMYS ended regular programming on its analog signal, over UHF channel 35, on February 17, 2009, the original target date for full-power television stations in the United States to transition from analog to digital broadcasts under federal mandate (which Congress had moved the previous month to June 12). The station's digital signal remained on its pre-transition UHF channel 32, using virtual channel 35.
