= KABB =

Television station in San Antonio

- San Antonio, Texas; United States
- Channels: Digital: 30 (UHF); Virtual: 29
- Branding: Fox SA Puro San Antonio

Programming
- Affiliations: 29.1: Fox; 29.2: Comet; 29.3: Rewind TV

Ownership
- Owner: Sinclair Broadcast Group; (KABB Licensee, LLC)
- Sister stations: WOAI-TV, KMYS

History
- Founded: April 19, 1985
- First air date: December 16, 1987
- Former call signs: KABB (1985–1987); KYRT (1987)
- Former channel number: Analog: 29 (UHF, 1987–2009)
- Former affiliations: Independent (1987–1995)
- Call sign meaning: Alamo Broadcasting

Technical information
- Licensing authority: FCC
- Facility ID: 56528
- ERP: 1,000 kW
- HAAT: 441 m (1,447 ft)
- Transmitter coordinates: 29°17′28″N 98°16′12″W

Links
- Public license information: Public file; LMS
- Website: foxsanantonio.com

KABB (channel 29) is a television station in San Antonio, Texas, United States, affiliated with the Fox network. It is owned by Sinclair Broadcast Group alongside NBC and CW affiliate WOAI-TV (channel 4) and co-managed with Kerrville-licensed KMYS (channel 35). The three stations share studios between Babcock Road and Sovereign Drive (off Loop 410) in northwest San Antonio, with administrative offices in an adjacent building west across its parking lot; KABB's transmitter is located near Elmendorf.

KABB began broadcasting on December 16, 1987. It was the second independent station for the San Antonio market after KRRT (now KMYS). KABB was built by Alamo Broadcasting Company and owned by River City Broadcasting between 1989 and 1996. Under River City, KABB outrated KRRT even though the latter was a Fox affiliate. KABB assumed the Fox affiliation from KRRT in January 1995 and debuted a 9 p.m. local newscast two months later. In 2012, Sinclair acquired WOAI-TV, bringing the city's NBC and Fox affiliates under common operation and a shared newsroom based at what had been KABB's studios on Loop 410.

== History ==
=== Construction and early years ===
Ten groups made applications by 1978 to operate UHF channel 29 in San Antonio. The first group to file was Family Television, Inc., which proposed a family-oriented independent station. By the time the Federal Communications Commission (FCC) designated the channel for comparative hearing in September 1981, seven parties remained in contention: Alamo Broadcasting Corporation, Christian Tele-Communications, Hubbard Broadcasting of San Antonio, Las Misiones de Béjar Television Company, Lee Enterprises, Tejas Broadcasting Company, and United Television Broadcasting Corporation.

In August 1982, FCC administrative law judge Joseph Stirmer selected Alamo for the permit. Of the seven groups, Hubbard, Lee, and Tejas were disqualified early on the basis of owning stations elsewhere. United Television was disadvantaged because of its majority ownership by United Cable, in spite of the involvement of Bob Roth, a longtime San Antonio broadcaster. Alamo, owned by Paris and Sherry Schindler, was owned by a family with a background in broadcasting, including construction permits for other stations in Texas and ownership of radio and TV stations in Texas and Arkansas. The ruling favoring Alamo was upheld by the FCC's review board in February 1983 and the full commission in March 1984, to the dismay of Misiones de Béjar and Christian Tele-Communications, who had appealed. With this ruling, the only recourse these companies had was to file a lawsuit in federal appeals court.

The final appeals were settled in late 1985, allowing work to proceed. By that time, the San Antonio market already had an English-language independent, KRRT (channel 35) in Kerrville. It leased land near Loop 1604 in Elmendorf for a tower as well as studio space at 520 N. Medina. KABB began broadcasting on December 16, 1987.

In April 1989, River City Television Partners of St. Louis agreed to purchase KABB. It was the second station purchase for the group, which under the name Atlantic Broadcasting had purchased KDNL-TV in St. Louis. That September, Alamo announced that the sale would not proceed, with a spokesman citing irreconcilable "material differences" between the parties. River City claimed that representatives for Alamo's parent, Schindler, refused to consummate the deal on time. River City moved to sue Alamo in federal court in Missouri on the grounds that Alamo's actions had resulted in "published untrue statements" disparaging River City and unfair use of contracts that River City had negotiated for programming. Two months later, the companies agreed on an $11 million sale of KABB to River City. By 1990, KABB had taken the total-day ratings lead over KRRT, even though the latter was San Antonio's Fox affiliate, with an average audience share of 8% compared to KRRT's 6%.

KABB became one of the television homes of the San Antonio Spurs basketball team beginning in the 1993–94 season. As part of an overhaul of the team's television rights, KABB aired about 60 percent of the team's road games, with the remainder on KSAT-TV (channel 12). For the 1994–95 season, KSAT had 25 games and KABB 16.

=== Becoming a Fox affiliate ===
In November 1993, Broadcasting & Cable magazine reported that River City was close to buying KRRT, then owned by Paramount Stations Group, even though River City had owned KABB since 1989. Reports circulated that such a deal would include affiliation with the new UPN network, then in the early formative stages, for its non-Fox independent stations. Though KABB secured the UPN affiliation as part of a group deal with River City, and Baker had told Variety that River City had been interested in a second San Antonio station since 1992, nothing came of this, in part because River City realized that changes to media ownership rules would come too late to permit River City to exercise its option to purchase KRRT in a timely manner.

In August 1994, Paramount sold KRRT and WLFL in Raleigh, North Carolina. The buyer for KRRT was a group owned by Myron Jones and John Kanzius; Jones and Kanzius were involved with Jet Broadcasting, owner of WJET-TV in Erie, Pennsylvania, and River City principal Barry Baker had gotten to know them at industry meetings. The concept of KABB assuming KRRT's operations under a local marketing agreement (LMA) surfaced again in November 1994, this time with the Fox affiliation moving from channel 35 to channel 29.

Because of objections placed by KENS and KSAT, no sale had yet been approved by the FCC when Fox announced on January 4, 1995, that its affiliation would move to KABB on January 16. KABB had higher ratings; an impending 9 p.m. newscast, slated to launch that March; and a better tower position, at Elmendorf with other San Antonio stations unlike KRRT. That same day, UPN programming launched on KRRT instead of KABB. The deal was approved by the FCC and closed in midsummer; it allowed KABB to immediately expand the new 30-minute newscast to an hour, among other improvements. KRRT assumed broadcasts of games of the San Antonio Spurs from KABB in the 1996–97 season, freeing up channel 29 to preempt fewer Fox network programs.

River City sold its assets to Sinclair Broadcast Group in 1996. As Sinclair planned the various applications to conduct the River City merger, Jet Broadcasting sold the assets of KRRT to Sinclair and the license to Glencairn, Ltd.—97 percent of which was owned by Carolyn Smith, the mother of the controllers of Sinclair. The use of Glencairn as a licensee for stations to be managed by Sinclair in San Antonio; Columbus, Ohio; and Anderson, South Carolina, generated scrutiny and concerns as to whether a then-illegal duopoly was being constituted. The Rainbow/PUSH Coalition, headed by Jesse Jackson, announced in 1998 its plans to study the KABB–KRRT relationship in San Antonio, wanting to examine whether the latter station "[has] any meaningful corporate personality of its own". In March 1999, the FCC responded by asking Glencairn to amend its local marketing agreements so as to strip Sinclair of final decision-making authority as to programming.

=== Common operation with WOAI-TV ===
On July 19, 2012, Sinclair announced that it would acquire NBC affiliate WOAI-TV (channel 4) from High Plains Broadcasting as part of its purchase of six television stations, along with the assumption of the operations of two others, from Newport Television. Since FCC duopoly regulations prohibited common ownership of more than two full-power stations in a single market, Sinclair spun off KMYS to Deerfield Media; however, Sinclair retained control of KMYS through a shared services agreement (SSA).

The operations of KABB and KMYS initially remained separate from WOAI-TV, with the two stations retaining competing news operations. After a March 2013 fire, WOAI business offices moved out of that station's studios and to KABB; Sinclair then began devising plans to move the remaining news functions to the KABB facility and business offices to a new, adjacent two-story building. This freed up the second floor of the KABB building for the enlarged news operation. The transition of WOAI employees to the KABB/KMYS complex was finalized in December 2014.

In October 2023, KABB changed its branding from "Fox 29" to "Fox SA".

== Local programming ==
=== News operation ===
By August 1994, construction was underway on a newsroom at KABB's studios on Loop 410. Though adding a newscast was projected to double the station's budget, management believed it was necessary to make the station stand out amid increasing television choices.

The Nine O'Clock News debuted on March 20, 1995, two months after the station became a Fox affiliate, as a half-hour program. Several members of the weeknight anchor team had ties to San Antonio: Jim Marsh worked at KSAT in the early 1980s, meteorologist Alex Garcia joined KABB from KENS, and sportscaster Dean Acosta was a San Antonio native. As a result of the LMA with KRRT, the newscast was expanded to an hour in September 1995. Also at that time, the station debuted a Sunday night sports show, Maximum Sports. In 1998, KRRT began airing its first local news program: the WB 35 News at 5:30, a half-hour program produced and anchored by the KABB news team competing with national network newscasts.

In 1999, KABB reformatted the 9 p.m. news in an attempt to reach younger viewers aged 18-34. It bought out the contracts of Marsh and his co-anchor Jody Manley, with Lu Parker and Michael Valdes as their replacements, and the KRRT newscast was dropped in January 2000 to focus on the KABB broadcast. Comedian Johnathan Walton joined the newscast to provide offbeat feature segments. Parker departed in 2003 to host a lifestyle show on KENS.

KABB expanded into morning news on January 2, 2006, with the debut of Fox News First, a morning newscast from 6 to 8:30 a.m. that replaced infomercials in the time slot. The program expanded to three and then to four hours (running from 5 to 9 a.m.) on September 8, 2008. With the consolidation of WOAI and KABB under one newsroom, the stations initially maintained separate formats and lineups of anchors with a shared pool of reporters. Valdes and four other employees, from the lead female anchor to the assistant news director, departed in 2014; some cited the changed corporate atmosphere at the combined WOAI–KABB operation. As of June 2025, the station aired 27 hours a week of news programs, including Fox News First, an hour-long midday show known as Fox News Midday, and the 9 p.m. newscast, as well as the weekly public affairs program Focus on South Texas.

Since 2021, KABB has produced newscasts for Sinclair-owned WXLV-TV in Winston-Salem, North Carolina. KABB 9 p.m. weeknight anchor Camilla Rambaldi presented the WXLV newscasts from San Antonio until she left the station in January 2024.

=== Daytime ===
Also aired by KABB is a lifestyle show, Daytime @ Nine, which follows its morning newscast. Daytime was introduced in 2011. Beginning in 2013, the program was co-anchored by Esteban Solis, a former convicted felon who also worked in KABB's sales department. In 2023, Solis was arrested for driving while intoxicated; he was removed from the program, whose title changed from Daytime with Kimberly and Esteban to simply Daytime.

== Notable former on-air staff ==
- Darren M. Haynes – sports reporter and anchor, 2010–2012
- Lu Parker — weekend anchor, 1998–2000; weeknight anchor, 2000–2003
- Johnathan Walton — segment host, 2000–2002

== Technical information ==
=== Subchannels ===
KABB broadcasts from a transmitter near Elmendorf. The station's signal is multiplexed:

Subchannels of KABB
Subchannel	Res.	Short name	Programming
29.1	720p	KABB	Fox
29.2	480i	Comet	Comet
29.3	480i	Rewind	Rewind TV
35.2	480i	TheNest	The Nest (KMYS)
35.3	720p	TheNest	The Nest (KMYS)

Broadcast on behalf of another station

=== Analog-to-digital conversion ===
KABB shut down its analog signal, over UHF channel 29, on February 17, 2009, the original target digital television transition date. The station's digital signal remained on its pre-transition UHF channel 30, using virtual channel 29.
