= WOAI-TV =

Television station in San Antonio

- San Antonio, Texas; United States
- Channels: Digital: 28 (UHF); Virtual: 4
- Branding: News 4 San Antonio; CW SA (4.2)

Programming
- Affiliations: 4.1: NBC; 4.2: The CW; for others, see § Subchannels

Ownership
- Owner: Sinclair Broadcast Group; (WOAI Licensee, LLC)
- Sister stations: KABB, KMYS

History
- First air date: December 11, 1949
- Former call signs: KMOL-TV (1974–2002)
- Former channel numbers: Analog: 4 (VHF, 1949–2009); Digital: 58 (UHF, 2000–2009), 48 (UHF, 2009–2019)
- Former affiliations: All secondary: DuMont (1949–1950); CBS (1949–1950); ABC (1949–1957); UPN (1998–2000)
- Call sign meaning: derived from former sister radio station WOAI (AM), randomly assigned

Technical information
- Licensing authority: FCC
- Facility ID: 69618
- ERP: 800 kW
- HAAT: 457 m (1,499 ft)
- Transmitter coordinates: 29°16′11.5″N 98°15′55.9″W

Links
- Public license information: Public file; LMS
- Website: news4sanantonio.com; cw35.com

WOAI-TV (channel 4) is a television station in San Antonio, Texas, United States, affiliated with NBC and The CW. It is owned by Sinclair Broadcast Group alongside Fox affiliate KABB (channel 29) and co-managed with Kerrville-licensed KMYS (channel 35). The three stations share studios between Babcock Road and Sovereign Drive (off Loop 410) in northwest San Antonio, with administrative offices in an adjacent building west across its parking lot; WOAI-TV's transmitter is located in northwest Wilson County (near Elmendorf).

== History ==
The station first signed on the air on December 11, 1949, as WOAI-TV. It was the first television station in the San Antonio market, owned by Southland Industries along with WOAI (1200 AM). WOAI-TV and WOAI radio are among the few broadcast stations located west of the Mississippi River that have a call sign beginning with "W". In the early days of broadcasting, most Central Time Zone states were in the "W" territory. In 1923, the dividing line was changed to the Mississippi River. Since WOAI radio was already on the air, it kept its W call letters and when it put a TV station on the air, it shared that call sign.

WOAI-TV has been an NBC affiliate since its inception, owing to WOAI (AM)'s longtime affiliation with the NBC Red Network. In its early years of operation, it also carried programming from the three other major networks of the time: CBS, ABC and DuMont. WOAI lost the CBS and DuMont affiliations to KEYL (channel 5, now KENS) when that station signed on in February 1950. The two stations continued to share ABC programming until KONO-TV (channel 12, now KSAT-TV) signed on in January 1957.

On May 27, 1965, Crosley Broadcasting announced that it was purchasing the WOAI stations for $12 million. The FCC approved the sale on September 16, 1965 and Crosley's ownership became effective at midnight on October 27. Crosley would change its name to Avco Broadcasting Corporation effective January 17, 1966.

On November 25, 1974, Avco, which had, at that time, decided to exit broadcasting, announced that 20th Century Fox, through its United Television subsidiary, would be acquiring WOAI-TV. On December 11, 1974, coinciding with the station's 25th anniversary, WOAI-TV changed its call letters to KMOL-TV. The change was brought on by an FCC regulation in place at that time that prohibited non-commonly-owned TV and radio stations in the same market from sharing the same base call sign. Avco had sold WOAI radio to local startup Clear Channel Communications earlier in 1974, and the radio station retained the WOAI call letters. The sale to Fox was completed on November 5, 1975, with the new owners officially taking control at 12:01 a.m. the following morning. Chris-Craft Industries gained majority ownership of United in 1981, merging the group with BHC Communications (the owners of KCOP in Los Angeles and KPTV in Portland, Oregon).

When KRRT (channel 35, now KMYS) dropped its affiliation with the United Paramount Network (UPN) to join The WB in January 1998, KMOL began carrying UPN programming during the overnight hours. At the time, Chris-Craft had owned a 50% interest in UPN. The UPN affiliation later moved to Fredericksburg-licensed KBEJ (channel 2, now MyNetworkTV affiliate KCWX), which signed on the air in August 2000.

On August 12, 2000, Chris-Craft Industries sold its television stations to the Fox Television Stations subsidiary of News Corporation for $5.5 billion. The deal was finalized on July 31, 2001. News Corporation then traded KMOL and sister station KTVX in Salt Lake City to Clear Channel in exchange for WFTC in Minneapolis. This tradeoff protected future sister station KABB (channel 29) from losing its Fox affiliation. Not only did the purchase reunite KMOL-TV with WOAI Radio, but channel 4 also became the television flagship of the San Antonio-based conglomerate. Clear Channel officially took control of the station when the deal closed on October 2, 2001. Speculation immediately began that Clear Channel would restore the heritage WOAI-TV call sign to channel 4. This officially occurred on September 23, 2002. Although Clear Channel's San Antonio radio cluster was located in Northwest San Antonio, off I-10, WOAI-TV remained based in its downtown studios on Navarro Street.

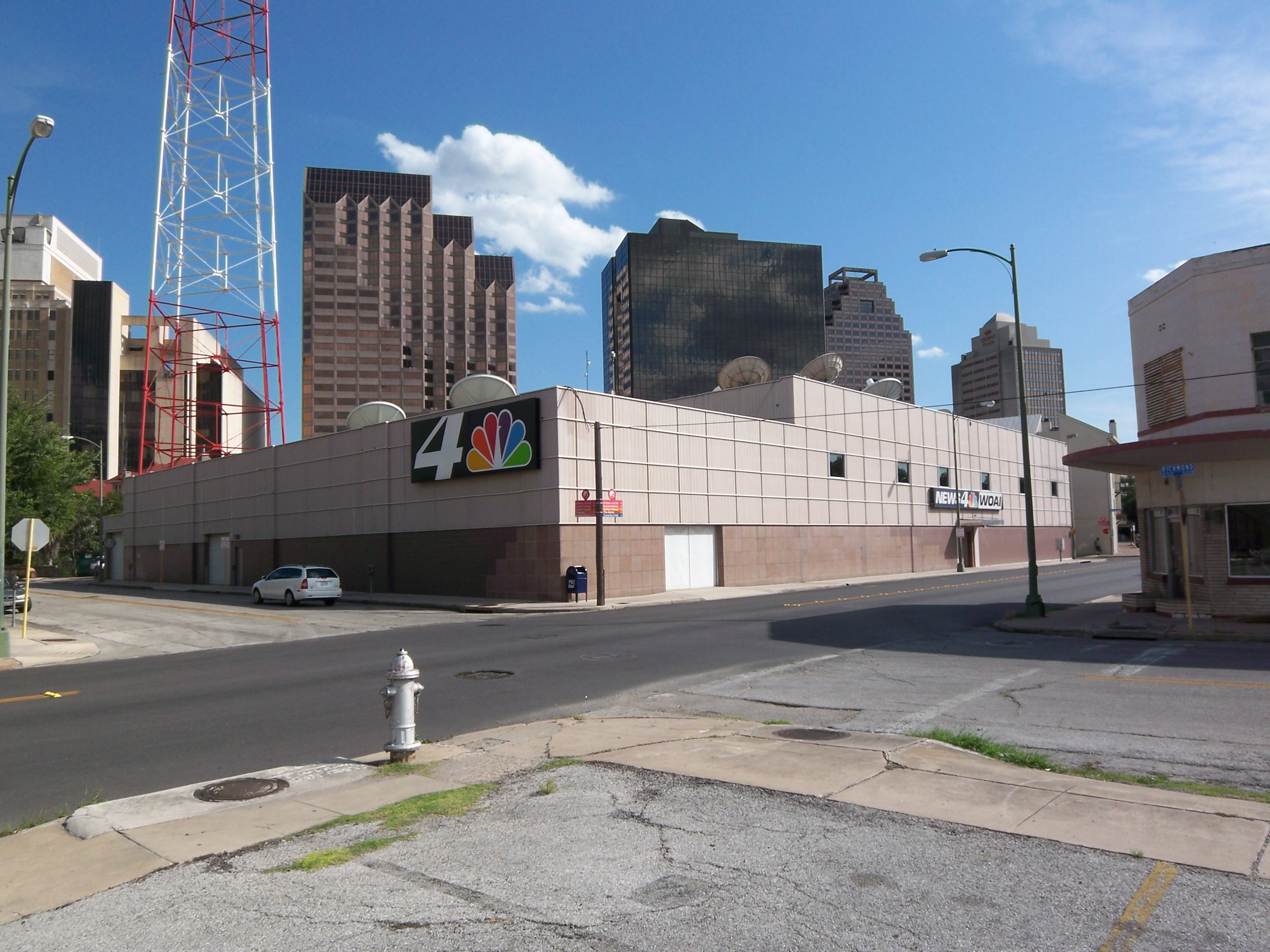
The former WOAI studio building, as seen from North St. Mary's Street.

On November 16, 2006, after being bought by private equity firms, Clear Channel announced that it would sell all of its television stations. On April 20, 2007, Clear Channel sold its entire television group to Providence Equity Partners-controlled holding company Newport Television; the group deal was finalized on March 14, 2008. However, channel 4 continued a news partnership with its former radio sister, and the two stations continued to share a website for two years afterward.

In May 2008, Newport Television agreed to sell WOAI-TV and five other stations to High Plains Broadcasting because of ownership conflicts. Providence Equity Partners also holds a 19% ownership stake in Univision Communications, the owner of Univision owned-and-operated station KWEX-TV (channel 41) and Telefutura station KNIC-TV (channel 17). In the case of San Antonio, it would have given Providence Equity control of three stations in the market. Even without KNIC in the picture, both WOAI and KWEX were among the four highest-rated stations in the San Antonio market at the time of the Clear Channel sale (and remain so today). The FCC normally does not allow two of the four highest-rated stations to be owned by a single entity. The sale was finalized on September 15, 2008. However, the sale to High Plains Broadcasting was in name only. Newport continued to operate the station under a shared services agreement, with High Plains only holding the FCC assets of the station (including the license). This effectively made High Plains Broadcasting a front company for Newport Television in a relationship similar to that between Mission Broadcasting and Nexstar Broadcasting Group as well as between Cunningham Broadcasting (and later Deerfield Media) and the Sinclair Broadcast Group. On December 17, 2007, WOAI debuted a slightly altered logo.

On July 19, 2012, Newport Television/High Plains Broadcasting reached a deal to sell 22 of the company's 27 stations to Sinclair, Nexstar and Cox Media Group. WOAI-TV was among the six that would be sold to Sinclair, making it a sister station to Fox affiliate KABB (channel 29) and CW affiliate KMYS (channel 35). Since FCC duopoly regulations forbid common ownership of more than two full-power stations in a single market from being under the same ownership, Sinclair spun off KMYS to Deerfield Media; however, Sinclair retained control of KMYS through a shared services agreement. In addition, while FCC rules disallow ownership of two of the four highest-rated stations in the same market, which normally precludes duopolies involving two "Big Four" network affiliates, Sinclair cited in its FCC purchase application that WOAI ranked as the fourth highest-rated station (behind KWEX-DT) and KABB the fifth-rated station in the San Antonio market in total day viewership. The Sinclair and Deerfield Media deals were consummated on December 3, 2012. KTVX, which had been a sister station to WOAI-TV since United Television acquired both stations in 1975, was sold to Nexstar, resulting in the two stations coming under entirely separate ownership and management for the first time in over 37 years.

The operations of KABB and KMYS initially remained separate from WOAI-TV, with the two stations retaining competing news operations. On the morning on March 19, 2013, a fire started in offices located on the second floor of WOAI-TV's studios, which resulted in the evacuation of the station's staff; the incident occurred during NBC News coverage of the papal inauguration of Pope Francis from Vatican City which stayed on the air for about six hours, allowing the station to focus on evacuation and backup broadcasting plans, as WOAI-TV was unable to broadcast from the building. For the remainder of the day, the station used a live truck to broadcast newscasts from a nearby parking lot, before temporarily moving to KABB/KMYS' facility on Babcock Road. Station and San Antonio Fire Department representatives cited an electrical short for causing the blaze. WOAI-TV moved back to the downtown facility on March 24. In October 2013, the San Antonio Express-News reported that Sinclair planned to move WOAI-TV's sales, promotions and executive offices from its Navarro Street studios to an adjacent building across the parking lot from KABB and KMYS' existing studio building and merge those same operations together in that building; the transition of WOAI-TV employees to the KABB/KMYS complex was finalized in the summer of 2014, with the completion of a shared newsroom on the second floor of the building that accommodates both WOAI-TV and KABB's respective news staffs.

== Programming ==
WOAI-TV carries the entire NBC programming schedule. However, the station airs several of the network's programs out of pattern: the fourth hour of Today airs on a one-hour delay from 11 a.m. to noon, and Late Night With Seth Meyers airs on a half-hour delay (starting at 12:07 a.m.); syndicated programs (as well as San Antonio Living) fill those programs' network-designated timeslots.

Outside of a delay of The CW's One Magnificent Morning block to early Monday mornings, WOAI-DT2 carries the entire CW programming schedule.

WOAI-TV also produces the hour-long daytime talk show San Antonio Living, which airs weekdays at 10 am. On August 22, 2010, WOAI-TV announced that it would replace Live! with Regis and Kelly with Rachael Ray on September 13 in an effort to boost ratings for San Antonio Living. The announcement sparked controversy with many loyal viewers as Live had connections with San Antonio as original co-host Regis Philbin was a fan of the San Antonio Spurs NBA franchise and San Antonio was showcased during the Fiesta event in a 1991 episode. What is now Live with Kelly and Mark returned to the market on KSAT in September 2011.

The station has aired many Spurs games through NBC's broadcast rights with the NBA from 1990 to 2002, and coming back in 2025 starting with a Tuesday night matchup between the Spurs and the Memphis Grizzlies. This includes the team's 1999 NBA Finals championship victory. WOAI's subchannel 4.2 carries a package of select Spurs games, split with KENS-TV and produced by FanDuel Sports Network Southwest.

=== News operation ===
WOAI-TV presently broadcasts 35 hours, 20 minutes of locally produced newscasts each week (with 6 hours, 34 minutes each weekday; one hour on Saturdays and 1 1/2 hours on Sundays); in addition, the station produces the half-hour sports highlight program Sports Sunday, which airs Sundays at 10:30 p.m. The station is branded as News 4 San Antonio, with the largest TV news operation in the city.

On September 16, 2009, WOAI-TV became the third television station in the San Antonio market (after KSAT and KENS) to begin broadcasting its local newscasts in high definition; with the change, the station introduced a new set for its newscasts as well as a modified version of its "big 4" logo (which was altered to a red, white and black color scheme). It was the first (and presently, the only) television station in the market to provide news video from the field in true high definition, as WOAI upgraded its ENG vehicles, satellite truck, studio and field cameras and other equipment to broadcast news footage from the field in high definition, in addition to segments broadcast from the main studio.

On September 6, 2010, WOAI-TV expanded its 6 p.m. newscast to one hour, with the addition of a half-hour extension at 6:30 pm. In 2011, the station's chief meteorologist, John Gerard (who announced his departure from WOAI in April 2014, to become the weekend meteorologist at CBS owned-and-operated station WFOR-TV in Miami), developed the "4-Zone Forecast"—a zonal forecast for four specific sub-regions of south Texas, compared to the broader regional forecasts for the area that are used by other local stations. In February 2012, WOAI introduced a storm chasing vehicle provided by Ancira, which is used during severe weather situations affecting south Texas. On January 25, 2016, WOAI debuted a half-hour noon newscast, which has now extended to a full hour.

== Technical information ==
=== Subchannels ===
The station's signal is multiplexed:

Subchannels of WOAI-TV
Subchannel	Res.	Short name	Programming
4.1	1080i	WOAI-DT	NBC
4.2	720p	CW	The CW
4.3	480i	Antenna	Antenna TV
4.4	480i	Charge!	Charge!

=== Analog-to-digital conversion ===
WOAI-TV ended regular programming on its analog signal, over VHF channel 4, on June 12, 2009, as part of the federally mandated transition from analog to digital television. The station's digital signal relocated its digital signal from its pre-transition UHF channel 58, which was among the high band UHF channels (52–69) that were removed from broadcasting use as a result of the transition, to UHF channel 48 for post-transition operations. WOAI-TV moved from RF channel 48 to RF channel 28 on June 21, 2019, as a result of the 2016 United States wireless spectrum auction.
