= Quest Couch =

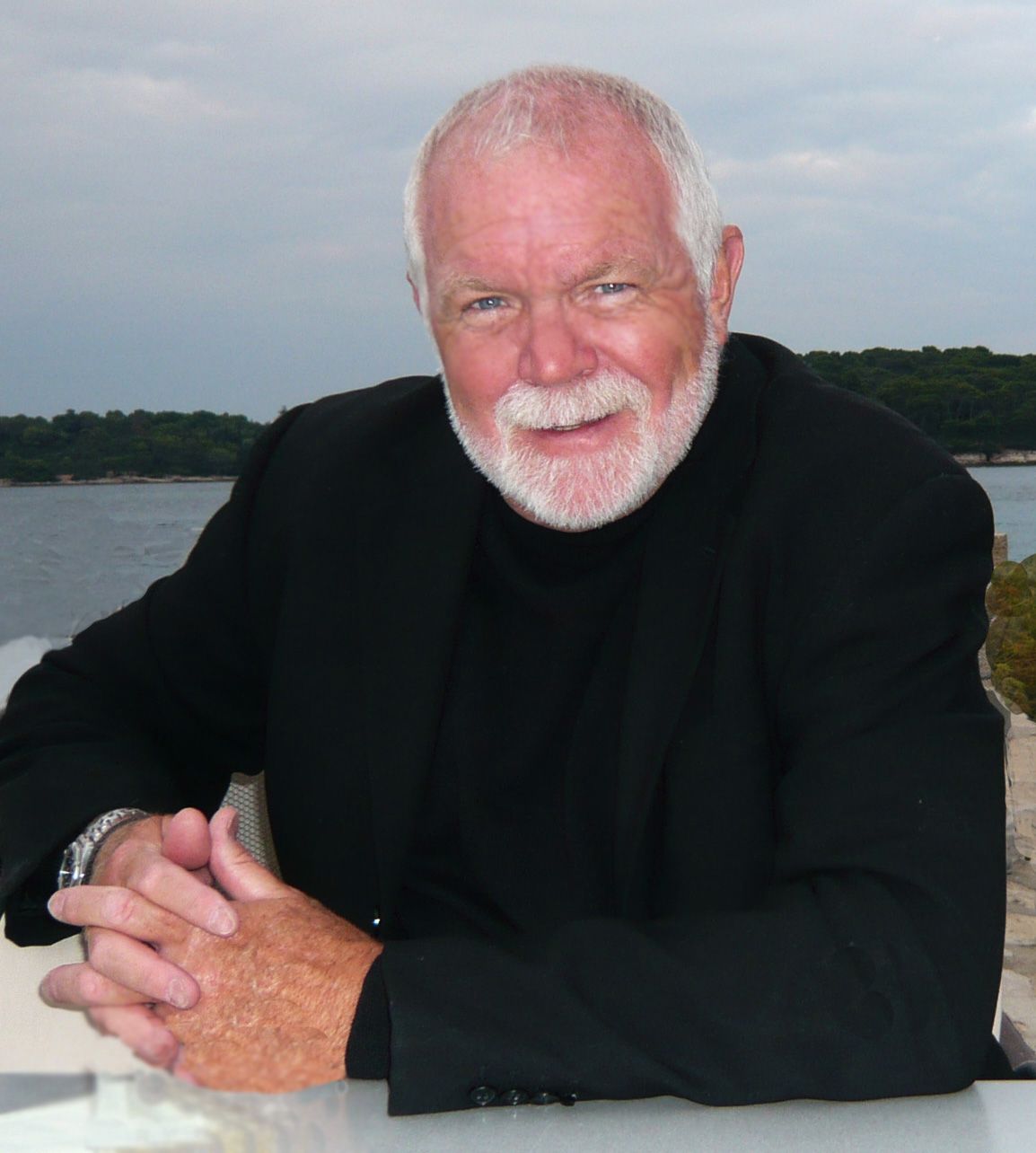
- Quest Couch
- Born: January 10, 1950; San Antonio, Bexar County, Texas
- Died: October 3, 2022 (aged 72)
- Occupations: Writer, photographer, inventor
- Website: www.lumiquest.com, www.casaquesttx.com

Quest Couch (born January 10, 1950 – October 3, 2022) was an American writer, photographer, designer and inventor. He created the LumiQuest line of photo flash accessories and is the author of several books on flash photography. He co-developed the CUDA line of SCUBA diving equipment in 1984. Couch continued to design and manufacture over 30 products under nearly a dozen patents. In 2016, he co-founded CasaQuest designing and building contemporary homes in the Texas Hill Country.

== Education ==
- B.S. 1972 Communications, University of Texas, Austin.
- M.A. 1974 Radio, television, film, University of Texas, Austin.

== Early Influences ==
While in graduate school Couch served as assistant to and was inspired by Rod Whitaker (pen name Trevanian), then University of Texas radio, television and film departmental chair and author. Whitaker introduced Couch to then CBS anchor Walter Cronkite. Later, Couch would write a script for Cronkite documenting the Lower Pecos Indians of Texas. The presentation was narrated by KENS TV anchor Chris Marrou. Over two decades, Quest Productions would produce, and Marrou would narrate over 30 films, videos and presentations for clients. Subjects ranged from children with muscular dystrophy to industry leaders, and three presidents of the United States, photographed for Lionel Sosa.

== Career ==
Couch has had a career in photography, writing, design, manufacturing and construction that has spanned over four decades. He developed the LumiQuest line of photographic accessories and he continues to design and market photographic accessories and contemporary homes.

- 1978: Founded Quest Productions.
- 1983: Judge at the National Film & Video Competition of the Public Relations Society of America.
- 1984: Co-developer of the CUDA line of SCUBA equipment.
- 1985: Judge at the American Multi-Image Festival.
- 1987: Co-founded LumiQuest, a manufacturer of photographic accessories, and continues to serve as C.E.O.
- 1993: Executive producer of the Opening Ceremonies for the U.S. Olympic Festival, San Antonio, TX.
- 1995: Producer and director of the opening ceremonies for the Senior Olympics.
- 2016: Co-founded CasaQuest, contemporary home design and construction.

== Books ==
- Creativity in a Flash: A Guide to Unlocking the Creative Potential of Your Hand-Held Flash. Fallenwater Publishing, 1996. ISBN 978-1-883403-42-3. ASIN B000AN0ZN4
- Flash: The Most Available Light. Fallenwater Publishing, 2004. ISBN 978-0-9748267-0-7.

== Patents ==
- U.S. Patent 4,752,263 - Scuba Buoyancy Control Device
- U.S. Patent D547,353 - Flash Diffusion Sheet
- U.S. Patent D342,273 - Light Diffuser for Electronic Flash
- U.S. Patent D335,717 - Portable Photographic Light Reflector
- U.S. Patent D312,471 - Reflective Camera Attachment
- U.S. Patent D640,723 - Gel Holder
- U.S. Patent D640,723 - Expandable Strap
- U.S. Patent D667,043 - Snoot with Telescopic Tube
- U.S. Patent 10364935 - Stand for Photographic Lights/Camera/Umbrella
- GB Patent 1044827DES - Reflective Camera Attachment
- CA Patent 60812 - Reflective Camera Attachment
- JP Patent 792573 - Reflective Camera Attachment
- FR Patent MA830/170590 - Reflective Camera Attachment

== Videos ==
Couch produces a series of instructional videos on flash photography and the use of LumiQuest Accessories

== Media ==
Quest Couch, his designs, products and inventions have been featured in the following articles and media:

American Media

Strobist (Oct 2008, Feb 2008, Nov 2007), Digital Photo (Sep 2008, Aug 2005, April 2008, Jan/Feb 2009), Imaging Info (Mar 2009), Digital Photo Pro Magazine (Nov 2009), Digital Pixels (Feb 2009), Picture Your World Photography (June 2009), The Digital Picture (Softbox Review), Gizmodo (Dec 2007), Photo Tidbits (April 2001), Camera Dojo (April 2008), Photo Tips Online (April 2009), John Milleker Photography (Dec 2008), Contact (Mar/April 1993), International Photographer (Aug 1991, Swimsuit 1992), Mac Design (July 2003), USA Today (April 8, 2009), Modern Photography (Mar 1988), Outdoor Photographer (April 1988, Aug 1992, April 2003, Sep 2003, Sep 2005, Nov 2009), Peterson's Photographic (Nov 91, Feb 92), Photo Electronic Imaging (Dec 1991, May 1992), Photo Methods (April 1988, Dec 1990), Photonews (Fall 2005), Photoshop (Feb 2004), Popular Photography (April 1989, Jan 1990, May 1990, Oct 1991, Sep 1992), Professional Photographer (Nov 91), Rangefinder (Dec 1991, Oct 1992, Dec 1992, Nov 1993, April 2004, June 2004), Shutterbug (May 1991, June 1991, June 1992, Aug 1992, Aug 1995, July 2009), Studio Photography (Feb 1991, Jan 1992), Studio Photography & Design (July 2003), Travel & Leisure (June 1989).

International

Australian Photography (Nov 1992), Chasseur d'lmages (Jan/Feb 1990), Color Foto (Nov 1990, Dec 1992), Focale (Jun 1990), Fotoheft (Jun 1990), Foto Creativ (May/Jun 1990), FotoDoka (April 1991), FotoGrafai (April 2005), Foto Magazine (Jun 1990), lnvista (Anno 11, Numero 32), Kaufberatung (Jan 1991), Leica Fotografie Intl (Jan 1991, Feb 1992), Makrofotografie (Aug 1990), MFM Fototechnik (May 1990), Sonderdruck Aus Photographie (Oct 1990).
