= List of Broward College alumni =

Broward College alumni

This list of Broward College alumni includes graduates, non-graduate former students, and current students of Broward College, a state college in Fort Lauderdale, Florida.

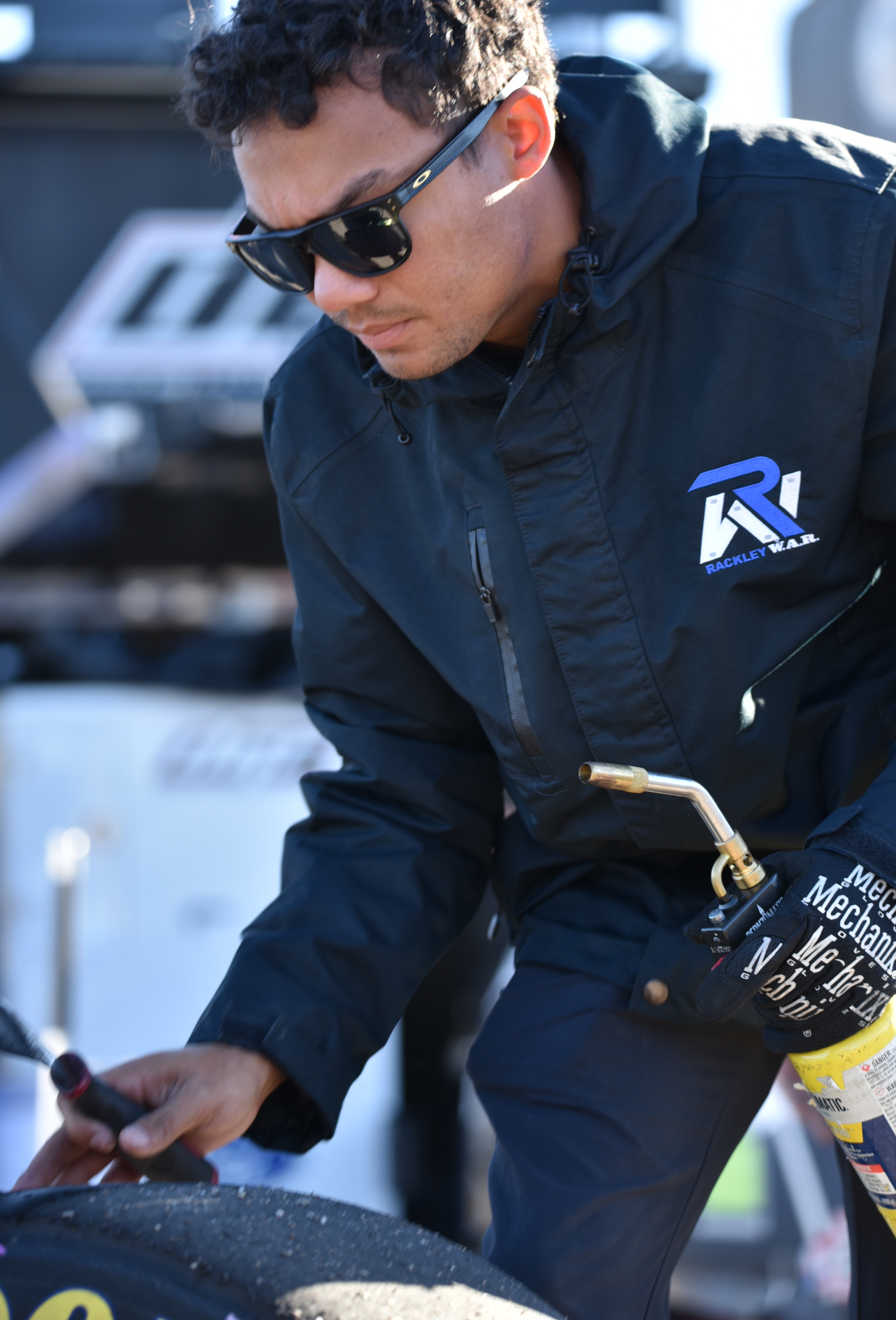
Brad Perez

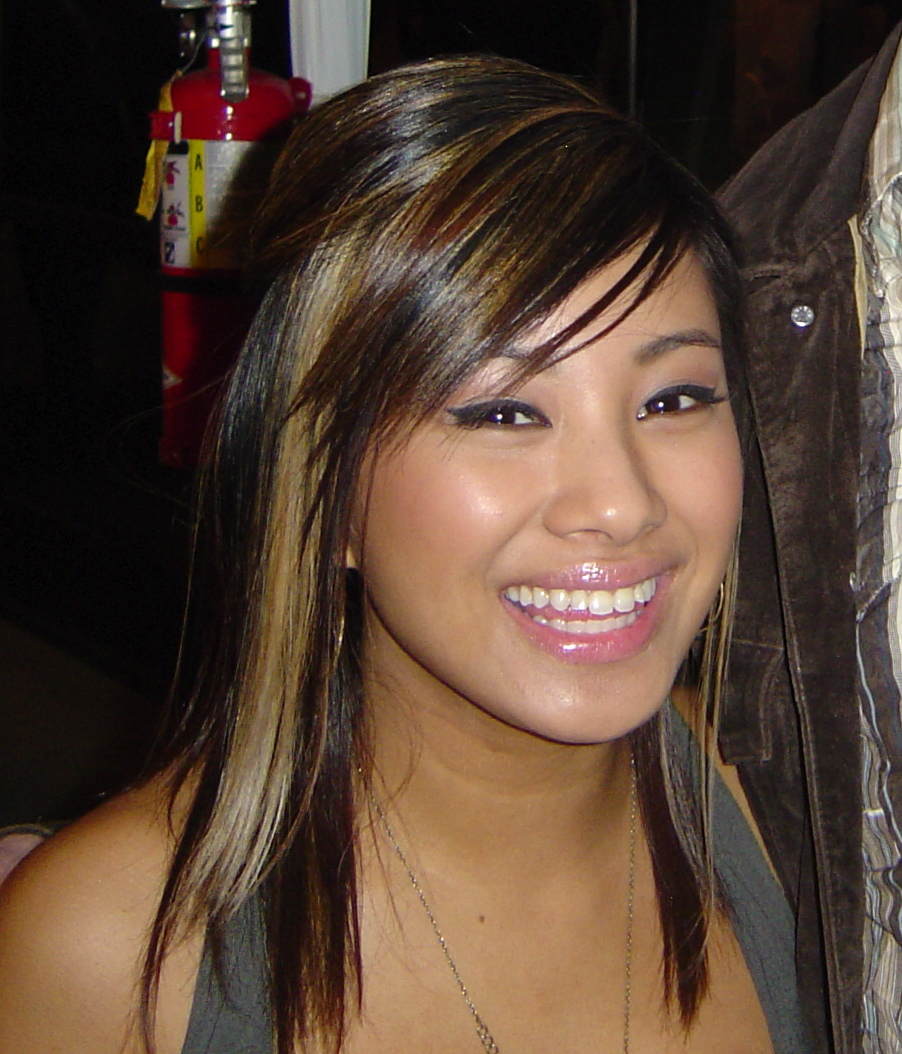
Ramiele Malubay

== List ==
Alumnus	Notability
Rita Mae Brown	Author, poet, essayist, and screenwriter
Mike Donald	Professional golfer
Parris N. Glendening	Former governor of Maryland
Drake Hogestyn	Actor, best known as John Black on Days of Our Lives
Rosemary Homeister, Jr.	Jockey
Barrington Irving	Pilot
Alexis Jeffers	Saint Kitts and Nevis politician
Mat Latos	Major League Baseball pitcher
Bobby Joe Long	Serial killer
Ramiele Malubay	Singer and American Idol contestant
Marilyn Manson	Entertainer, real name Brian Warner
Valeria Morales	Miss Colombia 2018
Jim Naugle	Former mayor of Fort Lauderdale, Florida
Don Newhauser	Former Major League Baseball pitcher
Brad Perez	NASCAR driver
Jonathan Putra	Video jockey, model, and musician
Steve Rosenberg	Major League Baseball player
Gerard John Schaefer	Murderer and suspected serial killer, known as "the Killer Cop"
Robert R. Shafer	Actor
Jason Steele	Former member of the Florida House of Representatives
Nancy Valen	Actress
Johnathan Walton	Emmy Award-winning reporter
