= LumiQuest =

- Company type: Private
- Industry: Photographic Accessories
- Founded: 1987
- Headquarters: New Braunfels, Texas, United States
- Area served: Worldwide
- Key people: Perry Thomson
- Products: Pocket Bouncer, 80-20, SoftBox, SoftBox II, SoftBox III, Pro Max System, FXtra and more
- Website: www.lumiquest.com

LumiQuest is an American manufacturer of photographic accessories, including folding light modifiers for shoe mount photographic flashes.

LumiQuest was founded in 1987 by Quest Couch and Heidi Kenny.

== Products ==
The LumiQuest line of flash modifiers is designed to help photographers control the quality of light from hot shoe mounted flashes. LumiQuest accessories fold flat for storage and attach to the flash with an UltraStrap. They modify the light in a variety of different ways depending on the model. By diffusing, bouncing, restricting or colorizing the light, the photographer can affect the quality of light and therefore the resulting photograph.

LumiQuest accessories are designed for serious amateur and professional photographers. These accessories are used under a variety of situations and applications: weddings, photojournalism, portraiture etc. NASA requested and LumiQuest fabricated accessories of Gore-Tex spacesuit material for use on the space shuttle.

LumiQuest produces a series of instructional videos on flash photography and the use of their accessories.
