= Maria L. de Hernández =

Mexican-American rights activist

- Born: María Rebecca Latigo de Hernández; July 29, 1896; Garza García, Mexico
- Died: January 8, 1986 (aged 89); Austin, Texas, United States
- Resting place: Orden Caballeros de América outside of Elmendorf, Texas
- Occupations: Mexican American rights activist; Labor leader; Civil rights; Radio announcer
- Years active: 1929–1986
- Known for: Co-founded Orden Caballeros de America (with her husband); Organized the Asociación Protectora de Madres
- Spouse: Pedro Hernandez Barrera
- Children: 10

María Rebecca Latigo de Hernández (July 29, 1896 – January 8, 1986) was a Mexican-American rights activist. She was born in San Pedro Garza García, Mexico. During the 1930s, she spoke publicly and demonstrated on behalf of Mexican Americans about their education in the United States. She and her husband, Pedro Hernandez Barrera, founded Orden Caballeros de America on January 10, 1929. She organized the Asociación Protectora de Madres in 1933. In 1970 she was active in the Raza Unida Party.

== Personal life ==
Hernández was married in 1915 at the age of 19 to Pedro Hernández Barrera. They were married in Hebbronville, Texas. They moved to San Antonio, in 1918, where they settled down, and their family eventually grew to include 10 children.

She died of pneumonia on January 8, 1986. She is buried in the plot of the Orden Caballeros de América outside of Elmendorf, Texas.
