= Elmendorf Beast =

Coyote blamed for attacks on livestock in Elmendorf, Texas

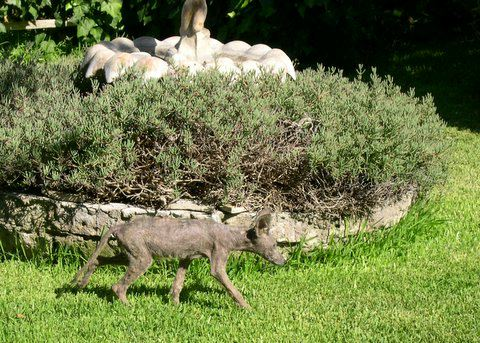
- A coyote with severe hair loss from mange, one suggested explanation for the creature

Creature information
- Grouping: Canidae
- Folklore: Local legend based on the misidentification of a known creature.

Origin
- First attested: 2004
- Country: United States
- Region: Elmendorf, Texas
- Details: Found in fields, forest, farm land

"Elmendorf Beast" was the name given to a coyote blamed for several attacks on livestock in Elmendorf, Texas. Various opinions have been offered as to the identity of the creature, including that it was a Mexican Hairless Dog whose appearance had been altered by sickness and/or congenital ailments, and that it was a wolf–coyote cross. Some local people have linked it to the legend of the Chupacabra, while others believe that it was the product of a lab experiment that escaped, or that it was a previously unknown form of canid that was forced into contact with humans after its natural habitat was destroyed.

== Analysis of the carcass ==
In August 2004, an animal eventually termed the Elmendorf Beast was shot and killed by local rancher Devin McAnally. The animal was found to be twenty pounds (nine kilograms). It had a severe overbite and unusual skin which was blue and hairless. Experts at San Antonio Zoo were unable to conclusively identify the creature, but based on its skull they speculated that it was a Mexican Hairless Dog. It was later determined by DNA assay conducted at University of California, Davis to be a coyote with demodectic or sarcoptic mange and not originally hairless. DNA gathered from the carcass was inconclusive due to environmental degradation, though it was confirmed that the animal was a member of the canine family.

Two similar carcasses were discovered in Texas and were found to be coyotes, suffering from very severe cases of mange.
