= KENS =

Television station in San Antonio

- San Antonio, Texas; United States
- Channels: Digital: 29 (UHF); Virtual: 5
- Branding: KENS 5 (call sign pronounced as a word)

Programming
- Affiliations: 5.1: CBS; for others, see § Subchannels

Ownership
- Owner: Tegna Inc., a subsidiary of Nexstar Media Group; (KENS-TV, Inc.)

History
- First air date: February 15, 1950
- Former call signs: KEYL (1950–1954); KGBS-TV (1954); KENS-TV (1954−2009)
- Former channel numbers: Analog: 5 (VHF, 1950–2009); Digital: 55 (UHF, 2002–2009), 39 (UHF, 2009–2019)
- Former affiliations: All secondary: DuMont (1950–1955); ABC (1950–1957); Paramount (1950–1953); NTA (1956–1961)
- Call sign meaning: Express-News Stations (originally shared with former sister radio station KENS)

Technical information
- Licensing authority: FCC
- Facility ID: 26304
- ERP: 1,000 kW
- HAAT: 441 m (1,447 ft)
- Transmitter coordinates: 29°16′11.5″N 98°15′55.9″W

Links
- Public license information: Public file; LMS
- Website: www.kens5.com

KENS (channel 5) is a television station in San Antonio, Texas, United States, affiliated with CBS and owned by the Tegna subsidiary of Nexstar Media Group. The station's studios are located on Fredericksburg Road in northwest San Antonio, near the South Texas Medical Center, while its transmitter is located off US 181 in northwest Wilson County (northeast of Elmendorf).

== History ==
The station first signed on the air on February 15, 1950, as KEYL; channel 5 was the second television station to sign on in the San Antonio market, debuting three months after primary NBC affiliate WOAI-TV (channel 4). The station has been a primary CBS affiliate since its sign-on, however it initially carried secondary affiliations with DuMont, ABC and the Paramount Television Network—the former two affiliations were shared with WOAI-TV. The station was originally owned alongside KABC radio (680 AM, now KKYX). KEYL was one of Paramount's strongest affiliates, carrying nearly the network's entire lineup. Among the Paramount programs that KEYL aired were Armchair Detective, Latin Cruise, Hollywood Reel, Hollywood Wrestling, Time for Beany and Movietown, RSVP.

In 1951, Storer Broadcasting (which had good relations with CBS) bought KEYL and KABC. On February 1, 1954, KABC and KEYL became KGBS and KGBS-TV. In November of that year, Storer was forced to sell KGBS-AM-TV to the San Antonio Express-News, in order to complete the company's purchase of WXEL in Cleveland as keeping KGBS-TV would have put the company one station over Federal Communications Commission (FCC) ownership regulations that went into effect that year which limited the number of television stations that could be owned by one company to seven, with no more than five of those allocated to the VHF band (at the time, newspapers could own television and/or radio stations in the same market provided that such ownership complied with the FCC-mandated ownership limits of each property in effect at the time). The Express-News then changed the call letters of the television and radio stations to KENS-TV and KENS.

DuMont ceased most network operations in 1955, but would honor network commitments until August 1956, when it ceased operations permanently. Channel 5 lost ABC programming when KONO-TV (channel 12, now KSAT-TV) signed on in 1957, leaving KENS as a full-time CBS affiliate. During the late 1950s, the station was also briefly affiliated with the NTA Film Network.

In early 1962, the Express-News and KENS-AM-TV were purchased by Harte-Hanks Communications; the radio station was sold off a few months later since Harte-Hanks was not interested in radio station ownership at the time. When the FCC tightened its cross-ownership rules in the early 1970s, Harte-Hanks sought grandfathered protection for its San Antonio media combination. However, while the FCC granted such protection to several media combinations across the country, it would not do the same to the Harte-Hanks combination in San Antonio. Accordingly, in 1973, Harte-Hanks opted to keep KENS-TV and sell the Express-News to Rupert Murdoch's News Corporation.

In the mid-1980s, KENS operated a short-lived local cable channel that was carried on Rogers Cablevision channel 24, called KENS II. The channel started its broadcasts on September 2, 1984. Under the direction of station manager Larry Smith, the channel's programming included replays of channel 5's local newscasts, broadcasts of Ron Taylor and Janie Groves' classified real estate programming and a few locally produced programs and specials such as Auto TV (hosted by Richard Courchesne and Michael Saul), and Barney Regets' computer generated musical video kaleidoscope created earlier at UA Columbia's Consumer Cable 29. In March 1985, KENS II expanded its timeslot to 24 hours. On March 24, 1985, KMOL-TV parent company United Television filed a protest with the FCC, claiming that by operating KENS II, KENS gave itself an unfair competitive advantage, and that Harte-Hanks was violating the spirit of the commission's long-standing rules that forbade duopolies. KENS management maintained that the duopoly rules did not apply to cable television. The claims of KMOL were rejected by the FCC that October in a decision that was closely watched by industry observers. In February 1988, KENS II cut back its timeslot in order to invest more financial resources into KENS-TV. Its remaining timeslots were filled in by the Travel Channel and the Fashion Channel. After a little over four years on the air, KENS II was shut down and was replaced by American Movie Classics on May 1, 1988.

In July 1990, it was reported that KENS was holding talks with ABC about switching to that network, which would have left existing affiliate KSAT without a network affiliation. Then-KENS general manager Michael Conly cited CBS's then-distant third ranking as a reason for wanting to switch networks, feeling that the poor performance of CBS programming at the time would harm KENS's overall dominance in the San Antonio market. The talks did not go anywhere, and the following month, both KENS and KSAT signed new affiliation agreements with their existing networks.

In 1993, Harte-Hanks acquired what at the time became the second incarnation of KENS radio (1160 AM). In September 1997, Harte-Hanks sold its remaining media properties, including the KENS stations, to the E. W. Scripps Company in order to concentrate on the company's direct marketing operations. At the same time, Belo Corporation announced that it would trade its controlling stake in the Food Network to Scripps in exchange for the KENS stations. The Harte-Hanks/Scripps deal and the transfer of Belo's stake in the Food Network to Scripps were both completed on October 15 of that year. At that time, Belo took over the operations of the KENS stations through a time brokerage agreement (TBA). Belo completed its purchase of the KENS stations on December 4, 1997. The second incarnation of KENS radio was sold to The Walt Disney Company in 2003, which converted the station into a Radio Disney outlet as KRDY. In August 2000, KENS began to manage upstart UPN affiliate KBEJ (channel 2, now KCWX) under a local marketing agreement (LMA). The LMA was terminated in April 2010, five months before the station lost its CW affiliation.

KENS remained closely associated with the Express-News, even though the station and newspaper had been under separate ownership for many years. The station shared its main website with the newspaper until the end of 2008, when the news partnership agreement between KENS and the Express-News ended. The station launched its own website, Kens5.com, on January 26, 2009. The site has been recognized with two Lone Star Emmy Awards for Interactivity and the 2011 and 2015 Regional Edward R. Murrow Award for "Best Large-Market Website."

On June 13, 2013, the Gannett Company announced that it would acquire Belo's television properties, including KENS, for $1.5 billion. The sale received FCC approval on December 20, and was formally completed on December 23, 2013, reuniting KENS with former Harte-Hanks sister stations WFMY and WTLV. On June 29, 2015, the Gannett Company split in two, with one side specializing in print media and the other side specializing in broadcast and digital media. KENS was retained by the latter company, named Tegna.

Nexstar Media Group acquired Tegna in a deal announced in August 2025 and completed on March 19, 2026.

== Programming ==
KENS clears the entire CBS network schedule. The station splits the CBS WKND lineup into two blocks that bookend its Saturday morning newscast (with the first hour airing before the program and the final two airing after it) and splits Face the Nation into two half-hour blocks (as such, it is one of several CBS affiliates that carry the program on both Sunday mornings and overnights in such a manner). KENS acquired the local syndication rights to Jeopardy! and Wheel of Fortune in September 1999 from KMOL-TV (now WOAI-TV).

The station also produces the local talk and lifestyle program Great Day SA, which airs weekdays at 9 a.m. (the format of the program is modeled after similar morning talk programs produced by other former Belo stations as well as certain ones owned by Gannett prior to the latter's purchase of Belo, including Dallas sister station WFAA's Good Morning Texas and Houston sister station KHOU's Great Day Houston); the program debuted on September 8, 2003, and features local and national music artists, celebrities, and local human interest stories. It was formerly hosted by 1994 Miss USA winner Lu Parker and later Kristina Guererro (later a reporter for the syndicated program Inside Edition, most recently an entertainment reporter for E!).

=== Past program preemptions and deferrals ===
From its September 1997 premiere to 2019, KENS preempted the Saturday edition of CBS This Morning due to its Saturday morning newscast (as a result, CBS This Morning Saturday did not air at all in the San Antonio market); the station also gained notoriety in 1993 by being one of the few CBS affiliates that chose to air the Late Show with David Letterman on a half-hour tape delay, in favor of airing syndication programming immediately following its 10 p.m. newscast. From September 1995 until both shows returned to their respective recommended 10 a.m. and 11 a.m. timeslots in September 1999, KENS began carrying The Price Is Right on a one-hour delay to air syndicated programs during the 10 a.m. hour, resulting The Young and the Restless to be moved concurrently to 3 p.m. After not airing the program for the first eight months, KENS also delayed The Late Late Show by three hours to 2:37 a.m. and later by 90 minutes to 1:07 a.m. during the entirety of Tom Snyder's and Craig Kilborn's runs as well as the first few years of Craig Ferguson's run.

=== Sports programming ===
KENS is one of the few stations in the United States that still maintains over-the-air broadcast rights to a major sports franchise: the station airs select NBA games featuring the San Antonio Spurs that are not carried by FanDuel Sports Network Southwest. During the 2021–22 season, KENS aired 10 Spurs games. The station also aired any Spurs games through the network's coverage with the NBA from 1976 to 1990.

KENS also provided coverage of the 1998, 2004, 2008, and 2025 NCAA Men's Final Fours, all of which took place at the Alamodome.

=== News operation ===
KENS presently broadcasts 36 hours, 55 minutes of locally produced newscasts each week (with 6 hours, 5 minutes each weekday; four hours on Saturdays and 2 1/2 hours on Sundays). Former KENS employee Bob Rogers was the station's longest-running news director. Under Rogers' stewardship, the ratings for Channel 5's newscasts shot to first place. Rogers was also responsible for hiring, coaching and helping the careers of many local and national news anchors, reporters and correspondents; he retired from the station in the late 1990s.

On January 7, 2008, when CBS's now-defunct morning program The Early Show abandoned its hybrid format that included local segments interspersed within the national program, KENS reduced its weekday morning newscast from three hours to two, airing from 5 to 7 a.m. Also at the same time, Itza Gutierrez left her position as anchor of the Saturday morning newscast to become a stay-at-home mother (she was later replaced by Stacia Willson, who was later promoted to the weekday noon newscast).

Emmy Award-winning longtime anchor Chris Marrou, who worked at KENS for 36 years beginning in 1973, retired from the station in 2009. Marrou and other well-known anchors helped KENS dominate the 5, 6 and 10 p.m. news timeslots from the 1970s to the early 2000s. Marrou presented a long-running segment seen at the end of the weeknight editions of the 10 p.m. newscast, the Eyewitness Newsreel, in which Marrou narrated a package of humorous local news segments juxtaposed with out-of-context soundbites of CBS News anchors, politicians or celebrities "commenting" on the situation done in a faux newsreel style. Marrou wrote the segment each weeknight. With Marrou's retirement that year, the Eyewitness Newsreel segment was discontinued. In 2009, KENS announced that Jeff Vaughn (who previously served as a reporter for NBC affiliate KSHB in Kansas City) would replace Marrou as co-anchor of the 5, 6 and 10 p.m. newscasts starting in January 2010. In 2015, Jeff Brady (former KSAT and WFAA anchor) returned to San Antonio to become the station's lead male anchor for the evening newscasts.

In early June 2008, KENS began promoting a 'big switch' occurring on June 30, a date which the station began production of newscasts in high definition. On August 2, 2010, channel 5 became the first television station in the San Antonio market with a local newscast during the 4 p.m. hour, when it debuted a half-hour broadcast at 4 p.m. on Monday through Friday afternoons (the station opted to slot Jeopardy! to bookend the 4 and 5 p.m. newscasts). On January 10, 2011, KENS expanded its weekday morning newscast to 2½ hours, through the addition of a half-hour broadcast at 4:30 a.m.

In April 2022, KENS dropped the Eyewitness name from its newscast title after 52 years; its newscasts became branded afterward as KENS 5 News.

==== Notable former on-air staff ====
- Dan Cook
- Gary DeLaune – sports anchor
- Ainsley Earhardt
- Chris Marrou – anchor (1973–2009)
- Lynne Russell – anchor (1980–1983)
- Michael Tuck – (1967–1970)

== Technical information ==
=== Subchannels ===
The station's signal is multiplexed:

Subchannels of KENS
Subchannel	Res.	Short name	Programming
5.1	1080i	KENS-HD	CBS
5.2	480i	Quest	Quest
5.3	480i	Crime	True Crime Network
5.4	480i	OPEN	Outlaw (soon)
5.5	480i	JTV	Jewelry TV
5.6	480i	WEATHER	Weather
5.7	480i	ShopLC	Shop LC
12.4	480i	H&I	Heroes & Icons (KSAT-TV)

Broadcast on behalf of another station

=== Analog-to-digital conversion ===
KENS ended regular programming on its analog signal, over VHF channel 5, on June 12, 2009, as part of the federally mandated transition from analog to digital television. The station's digital signal relocated its digital signal from its pre-transition UHF channel 58, which was among the high band UHF channels (52–69) that were removed from broadcasting use as a result of the transition, to UHF channel 39 for post-transition operations. The station vacated channel 55 in November 2008 to allow Qualcomm to begin testing for its now-defunct mobile television service MediaFLO.

In the interim period between November 2008 and June 2009, KENS's new digital signal hosted KWEX-DT, whose pre-transition digital signal broadcast on channel 39. After the digital transition was complete, KENS-DT retained the channel 39 facilities, while KWEX-DT launched its permanent digital operations on UHF channel 41 (the station's previous analog frequency). The transition also allowed former sister station KCWX (which prior to the conversion, did not have an over-the-air digital signal) to begin transmitting its digital signal on VHF channel 5.

KENS moved from RF channel 39 to RF channel 29 on June 21, 2019, as a result of the 2016 United States wireless spectrum auction.
