= Johnathan Walton =

American comedian

- Occupations: Journalist and podcaster
- Website: https://johnathanwalton.com/

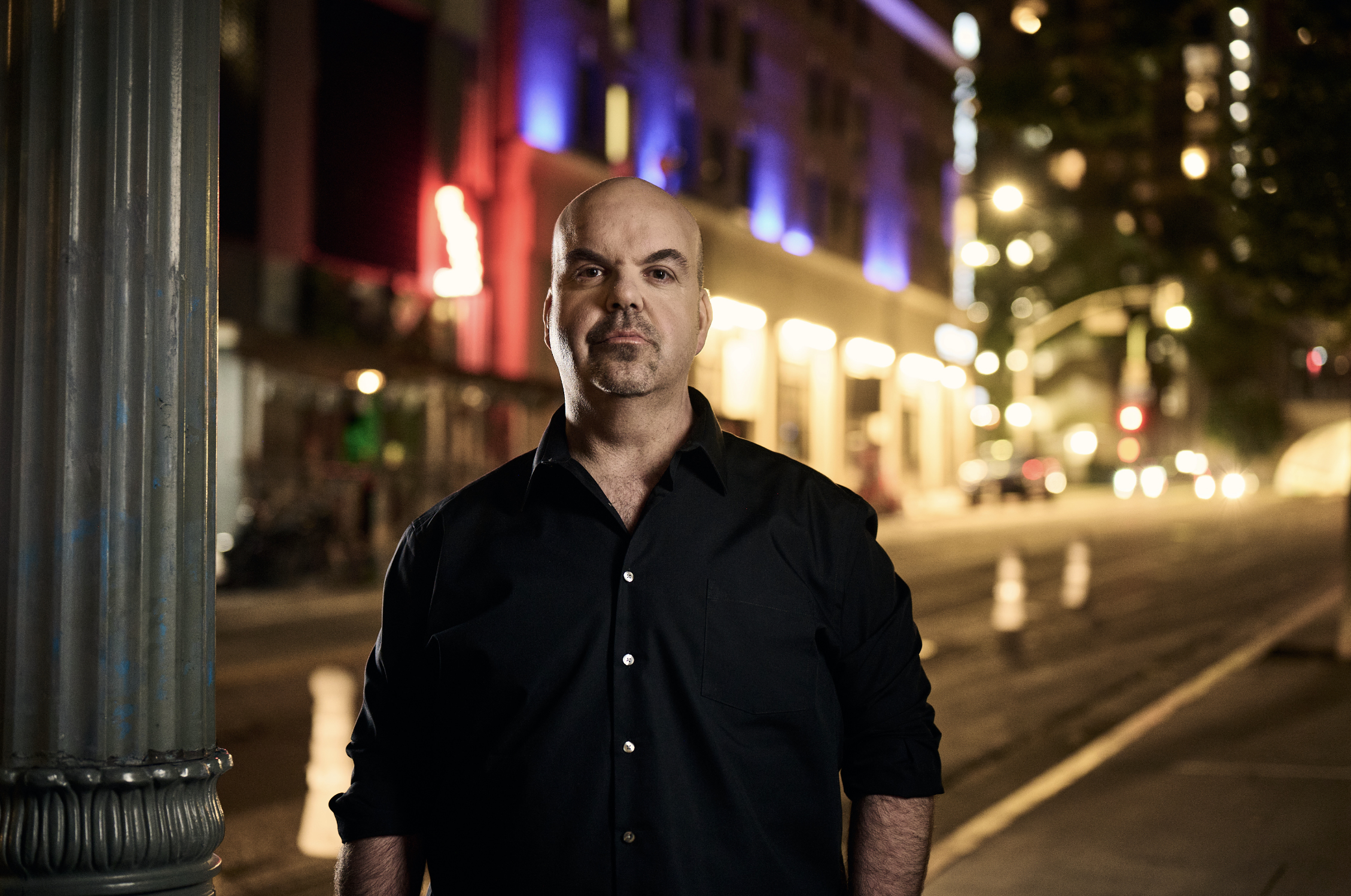
Johnathan Walton, Los Angeles, California

Johnathan Walton is a public speaker and author of the book Anatomy of a Con Artist: The 14 Red Flags to Spot Scammers, Grifters and Thieves. He also writes, produces and hosts the podcasts Hardcore Con, Queen of the Con, Cocaine Air, The Quarterback and The Con Artist and The Handyman of West Texas.

In his free time Walton is a vigilante who hunts con artists. The first con artist Walton put in jail was Marianne Smyth aka Mair Smyth aka Marianne Clark, who scammed hundreds of thousands of dollars from 43 victims, including Walton himself, in the United States and Europe, using an elaborate series of confidence tricks. She was convicted of stealing money from him and spent about two years in jail. After Smyth's Los Angeles conviction in 2019, Walton worked with authorities in the UK to get Smyth extradited and convicted in Northern Ireland in Sept 2025.

Walton also works as a television producer on reality television shows like American Ninja Warrior for NBC, Shark Tank for ABC and Savage Builds for the Discovery Channel. His career in unscripted television was preceded by a 10-year stint as an Emmy Award-winning TV news reporter and producer at local stations KHOU-TV in Houston, Texas, KABB-TV in San Antonio, Texas, and WSVN-TV in Miami, Florida.

== Awards ==
- Has won four Regional Emmys for his primetime television specials for CBS Houston (KHOU-TV).
  - 2006 Emmy for Walton's World Gone Wild aired Dec. 2005. KHOU-TV Houston Johnathan Walton, Reporter
  - 2005 Emmy for The Best of Walton's World Strikes Back aired Dec. 2004.
  - 2004 Emmy for The Best of Walton's World Gone Wild
  - 2003 Emmy for Christmas in Walton's World show.
- 2004 Texas Associated Press Broadcasters First Place Light Feature.
- Numerous Houston Press Club Lone Star Awards
- 2003 Houston Chronicle Award for "Baffoon". Described as "A pudgy, puckish clown for the 21st century,"
- 2006 Houston Chronicle Award for Funny Person on Local TV. Described as "tickles us best"
