= Chris Marrou =

American journalist

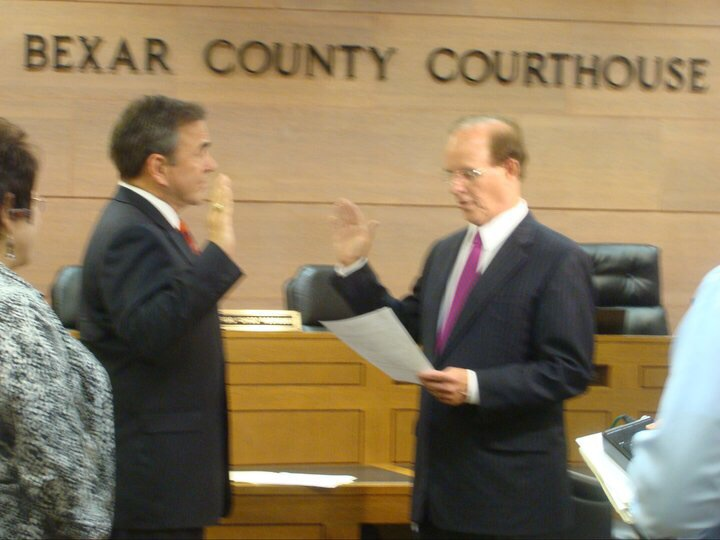
Being sworn in by Nelson Wolff.

Chris Rene Marrou (born November 12, 1947) is former news anchor for KENS 5-TV in San Antonio, Texas from 1973 to 2009. Marrou is known for doing segments where he involved himself in different occupations or tried unique endeavors (such as eating a hot chili pepper). At the end of the broadcast he ran the "Eyewitness Newsreel," for which he added humorous commentary to clips from the news.

== Early life and education ==
Marrou was born in Nixon, Texas, and moved with his family to Castle Hills, Texas when he was in grade school. He graduated from Robert E. Lee High School in San Antonio, Texas. After school he attended Princeton University from 1964 to 1967 to study political science.

== Career ==
=== Broadcasting ===
He returned to San Antonio and worked for WOAI-TV as a reporter, then had a brief stretch in Dallas at KRLD radio. In 1973, Marrou returned to San Antonio and joined the 10 o'clock news team at KENS as the anchor, alongside sportscaster Dan Cook. Except for a brief hiatus in 1980 to pursue an opportunity in Boston (where he presented the 5:30pm news at WBZ-TV, then an NBC affiliate), held that position until his retirement in 2009. KENS 5 news dominated the 6:00 PM and 10:00 PM news slots during the Marrou era.

Over his broadcasting career Marrou won several awards, including:

- Best Anchor in San Antonio 2007, San Antonio Current Reader Picks
- Best TV Newscast, 1995 and 1997, Texas Associated Press Broadcasters
- Best TV News Writing 1988, Texas Associated Press Broadcasters
- Best TV News Series 1988, Texas Associated Press Broadcasters
- Top Local News Anchor 1985, Television/Radio Age Magazine
- Best Documentary 1976, Texas Associated Press Broadcasters
- Inducted into the Texas Emmy Silver Circle, 2010.

=== Law ===
In 2007 Marrou received a law degree from St. Mary's University and passed the Texas bar exam in November 2007. In 2010, Marrou was appointed associate municipal judge of Von Ormy in southwestern Bexar County.

== Personal life ==
Chris Marrou is the brother of one-time Libertarian Party presidential nominee Andre Marrou. He married wife Kathy in August 1974; the couple has twin daughters, Molly and Mirage, born in 1988.
