= Elmendorf, Texas =

City in Bexar and Wilson counties in Texas, United States

- City
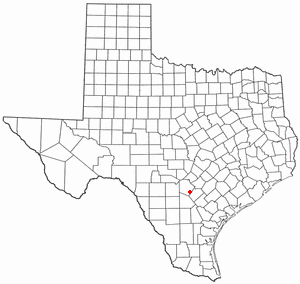
- Location of Elmendorf, Texas

- Coordinates: 29°15′12″N 98°19′12″W
- Country: United States
- State: Texas
- County: Bexar

Area
  - Total: 6.17 sq mi (15.98 km^{2})
  - Land: 6.14 sq mi (15.90 km^{2})
  - Water: 0.027 sq mi (0.07 km^{2})
- Elevation: 538 ft (164 m)

Population (2020)
  - Total: 1,862
  - Density: 350.2/sq mi (135.21/km^{2})
- Time zone: UTC-6 (Central (CST))
  - Summer (DST): UTC-5 (CDT)
- ZIP code: 78112
- Area codes: 210, 726
- FIPS code: 48-23272
- GNIS feature ID: 2410432
- Website: www.elmendorf-tx.com

Elmendorf is a city located in Bexar County and Wilson County, Texas, United States. It is part of the San Antonio—New Braunfels metropolitan statistical area. Its population was 1,862 at the 2020 census. It was founded in 1885, and named after Henry Elmendorf, a former mayor of San Antonio, and a German-Texan. For a long time, the biggest employer was Star Clay Products.

== Geography ==
Elmendorf is located in southeastern Bexar County 17 miles (27 km) southeast of downtown San Antonio at the junction of Farm to Market Road 327 and the Southern Pacific Railroad. A small portion of Elmendorf extends to the southeast into Wilson County.

According to the United States Census Bureau, the city has a total area of 4.5 square miles (11.7 km^{2}), of which 0.023 square miles (0.06 km^{2}), or 5.00%, is covered by water.

== Demographics ==
Historical population
Census	Pop.	Note	%±
1970	400		—
1980	492		23.0%
1990	568		15.4%
2000	664		16.9%
2010	1,488		124.1%
2020	1,862		25.1%
U.S. Decennial Census

=== 2020 census ===
As of the 2020 census, Elmendorf had a population of 1,862. The median age was 37.0 years. 26.1% of residents were under the age of 18 and 13.1% of residents were 65 years of age or older. For every 100 females there were 101.5 males, and for every 100 females age 18 and over there were 98.8 males age 18 and over.

0.0% of residents lived in urban areas, while 100.0% lived in rural areas.

There were 637 households, including 374 families, of which 40.2% had children under the age of 18 living in them. Of all households, 46.5% were married-couple households, 20.9% were households with a male householder and no spouse or partner present, and 25.0% were households with a female householder and no spouse or partner present. About 17.6% of all households were made up of individuals and 6.1% had someone living alone who was 65 years of age or older.

There were 670 housing units, of which 4.9% were vacant. The homeowner vacancy rate was 0.2% and the rental vacancy rate was 0.0%.

Racial composition as of the 2020 census
Race	Number	Percent
White	895	48.1%
Black or African American	23	1.2%
American Indian and Alaska Native	27	1.5%
Asian	13	0.7%
Native Hawaiian and Other Pacific Islander	0	0.0%
Some other race	438	23.5%
Two or more races	466	25.0%
Hispanic or Latino (of any race)	1,230	66.1%

=== 2000 census ===
As of the 2000 census, 664 people, 226 households, and 162 families were living in the city. The population density was 537.4 people per sq mi (206.8/km^{2}). The 266 housing units averaged 215.3/sq mi (82.8/km^{2}). The racial makeup of the city was 65.81% White, 0.75% African American, 1.05% Native American, 0.15% Asian, 28.46% from other races, and 3.77% from two or more races. Hispanics or Latinos of any race were 74.10% of the population.

Of the 226 households, 36.3% had children under the age of 18 living with them, 51.3% were married couples living together, 13.3% had a female householder with no husband present, and 27.9% were not families. About 24.3% of all households were made up of individuals, and 8.8% had someone living alone who was 65 years of age or older. The average household size was 2.93, and the average family size was 3.56.

In the city, the age distribution was 30.7% under 18, 8.6% from 18 to 24, 28.6% from 25 to 44, 22.0% from 45 to 64, and 10.1% who were 65 or older. The median age was 34 years. For every 100 females, there were 93.6 males. For every 100 females age 18 and over, there were 96.6 males.

The median income for a household in the city was $26,500, and for a family was $36,875. Males had a median income of $27,109 versus $19,583 for females. The per capita income for the city was $12,316. About 24.1% of families and 30.2% of the population were below the poverty line, including 39.6% of those under age 18 and 30.4% of those age 65 or over.

== Education ==
It is in the East Central Independent School District. The public high school is East Central High School.

== See also ==
- Elmendorf Beast
- Maria L. de Hernández – (July 29, 1896 – January 8, 1986), a Mexican-American rights activist, is buried in this town.
- Joseph D. Ball – (January 7, 1896 – September 24, 1938) is a serial killer suspected of killing up to 20 people in Elmendorf.
