= Greg Williams (sportscaster) =

American former radio personality

Greg "Greggo" Williams is an American former radio personality. Williams was most recently co-host of the sports talk program RAGE (Richie and Greggo Extravaganza) with Richie Witt. It aired at 2pm-7pm on KRLD-FM, "The Fan" 105.3, in Dallas, Texas. Williams first became popular as 'The Hammer', Mike Rhyner's partner on KTCK's top-rated The Hardline drivetime show, but his tenure there ended abruptly in 2008 after 13 years on the air.

== Career ==
Robert Gregory Williams was born in 1960 to parents "Junior" and Patsy Williams. Greg was a "service brat" living overseas until he was 13. He attended Boyd High School in Boyd, Texas, and graduated in 1978. He has two younger sisters, Ronna and Patti, and had a younger brother, Ron. In 1981 his only son Derek was born in Fort Worth. After graduating from Texas Christian University in Ft. Worth, TX, he started his career in Dallas/Fort Worth radio at WBAP-820 as co-host and show producer of popular host/columnist Randy Galloway. In the early 1990s Williams hosted a public-access television show called Sports Perspective.

It was also in the early 1990s that he first partnered with Mike Rhyner, with whom "Greggo" would become well known in the DFW area as co-host of the local hit radio show The Hardline. Rhyner, once "sports guy" on KZEW's much-lauded The Morning Zoo with LaBella & Rody, launched all-sports station KTCK in 1994, taking Williams with him to co-anchor the all-important drivetime slot.

The show was an immediate hit, and remains a top-rated sports talk show in its market still. Williams and Rhyner won a national acclaimed Marconi award from their efforts. Greggo was recognized as a top ten radio sports personality in the Nation, and the Hardline was constantly #1 in Arbitron ratings Men 25-54 demographic. Williams talents helped award the Hardline the #1 slot in DFW Arbitron ratings (men 25-52 demographic) for a decade. However, William's battle with cocaine addiction by mid-2007 led to his very sudden departure from the show (often described as "mid-syllable").

During 2007, a series of on- and off-air incidents had led to increased tension between the two hosts. On October 12, 2007, Williams was late for a live remote that The Hardline was doing that day, and did only one on-air segment before disappearing for unannounced reasons. Williams later admitted that program director Jeff Catlin had ordered him to take an immediate drug test, which Williams declined, because, as he later admitted, he "couldn't pass it". It was Williams' last show on KTCK.

Williams went into treatment for his addiction, while the station was prevented by privacy laws from discussing his situation in any way (as he was currently an employee on leave for medical treatment). However, his sudden absence was quickly noted by long-time fans, and became a "hot topic" of local discussion, leading to "Where's Greggo?" signs at KTCK remotes, and sightings reported in local newspapers such as The Dallas Observer. On The Hardline, Rhyner and Corby Davidson refused to comment on Williams' disappearance, eventually making a punch-line of both it, and Williams. His many "drops" (bits of dialog recorded from previous shows or interviews) were played back, along with less-than-subtle references to drug usage, such as playing Amy Winehouse's "Rehab" or Eric Clapton's "Cocaine" when coming back from commercials.

On December 20, KTCK was sent a "Cease and Desist" letter from Williams' attorneys preventing the station from referencing the former co-worker in any way by name or by on-air drops. On January 10, 2008 KTCK announced that Greg Williams had "resigned" from The Ticket. Greggo, however, maintained he had been fired, and claimed the company had given him (after 13 years) one month's severance pay.

On May 19, 2008, Williams announced that he had been officially diagnosed with depression and is currently taking prescription drugs to fight it. A few months later, in a cover story in the Dallas Observer, Williams described the entire series of events, admitting to cocaine abuse and other difficulties.

On September 8, 2008, Greg Williams began hosting a show called GameNight with Choppy & Greggo on 103.3 FM ESPN in Dallas with RJ Choppy.

On May 5, 2009, he reportedly was incoherent in comments made on the evening show he hosted with R.J. Choppy, and did not subsequently return. His claim has been that his doctor had made adjustments to his depression medication. It was eventually confirmed by Dallas Observer staff writer Richie Whitt that Williams was officially no longer working at ESPN Radio. However, Williams stated the actual reason he resigned from ESPN was due to station management refusing him to use the on air antics that he had found much success with on KTCK. Williams quoted "They wanted me to be bring the Ticket format to them, but they (ESPN) wouldn't allow me, to be me...so I quit. I play to win, I know how to win, if a program director will not allow me to run touchdown plays, I prefer to sit on the bench."

There were rumors around mid-June 2009 that Williams would return to the Dallas-Fort Worth airwaves as a guest on The Richard Hunter Show, hosted by former KTCK host Richard "Big Dick" Hunter, broadcast on Rational Radio KMNY 1360 AM. This happened on July 1, 2009, and again on the 2nd, 3rd, 6th and 7 July. Hunter commented that this was "the talk radio equivalent of a jam session" and he had wanted to have on Williams before Williams went to ESPN radio, but was not able to do so because of a contractual conflict. By July 22 however, he had seemingly begun a regular role on the show.

In December 2009, he returned to the airwaves as co-host of The Show with John Clay and Greggo, a syndicated sports talk program, alongside John Clay Wolfe. Williams broadcast from a studio in Fort Worth, Texas, although the flagship station for the program is Wolfe-owned KSEY ("ESPN 1230") in Wichita Falls, Texas. That show ended in February 2010 when Williams and Wolfe were unable to agree on financial terms. From May 2010 through March 2013, Williams co-hosted the sports talk program RAGE ("Richie and Greggo Extravaganza") with Richie Whitt. It aired at 2pm-7pm on KRLD-FM, "The Fan" 105.3, in Dallas, Texas. Williams was fired on April 15, 2013, and tweeted from his account the official letter from CBS announcing the move.

On December 6, 2022, Williams reunited with Mike Rhyner, who had retired in 2019 but returned to host an afternoon drivetime radio show at 97.1 The FREAK, now KEGL. The pair discussed Williams' drug issues and how he was fired from KTCK and reminisced about the good times as the top rated talk show hosts.

== Films ==
In 2015, Williams played the role of a DJ in the film Windsor.
