= Mike Rhyner =

American sports radio personality

Michael Rhyner, a.k.a. "The Old Grey Wolf", (born August 16, 1950) is a current podcaster and a former radio sports talk personality on KEGL 97.1fm The Freak and KTCK 1310am/96.7fm ("The Ticket") radio in the Dallas area. He helped found The Ticket in January 1994 and is sometimes referred to as the station's patriarch. He co-hosted The Hardline, a weekday afternoon show on the station, with Corby Davidson. He was on ESPN's list of "Sports Radio Personalities of the Year" in 1997, 1998, and 2003. He is a frequent guest on broadcast television.

== Early life ==
Rhyner was raised in the Oak Cliff district of Dallas, and he graduated from Kimball High School in 1968. As a boy, he was a fan of the Dallas Texans at the insistence of his father but later would switch his allegiance to the Dallas Cowboys. As a teenager, he played the drums in several local bands from which he said he earned a surprisingly good amount of money. He briefly attended El Centro College, part of the Dallas County Community College District, but did not graduate. In his early twenties, Rhyner continued to make a living playing music, but by his late twenties, he was not getting to where he felt he wanted to be. So, he returned to school to study radio broadcasting at the University of Texas at Arlington.

== Radio career ==
Rhyner started at KZEW in 1979 as a news intern and was shortly promoted to the assistant of the program director, Tom Owens. In 1982 at KZEW, he received a letter from the jailed John Hinckley Jr., attempted presidential assassin, who turned out to be a fan. The letter's creepiness proved to be a local sensation. In 1986, he left KZEW for WBAP to work in their sports department.

In 1994, Rhyner helped create The Ticket. He was responsible for selecting most of the original lineup, including George Dunham, Craig Miller, and Greg Williams. From 1995 to 2008, Rhyner co-hosted with Williams, and they were "the most dynamic duo in Dallas talk radio". In 2008, Rhyner had a public falling out with Williams, who left the show. The Dallas Observer in its year-end "best of" round up gave "Greg Williams versus Mike Rhyner" the award for best Dallas drama.

In 2009, CBS Radio attempted to poach Rhyner from KTCK, and Rhyner came close to accepting the new position but instead accepted an increased compensation package from Cumulus Media to stay with The Ticket. On July 3, 2014, Rhyner was inducted into the Texas Radio Hall of Fame. He styles his public personality as "The Old Grey Wolf", a cantankerous old fart and baseball fan in a football crazy world. Rhyner announced his retirement from the Ticket on January 6, 2020.

In 2022, Mike Rhyner announced that he would be joining a new talk radio station in Dallas. The Freak 97.1fm (formerly The Eagle) launched with Mike as one of the host of the Downbeat, later the Speakeasy. In April 2024, 97.1fm The Freak returned to The Eagle and a music platform.

In May of 2024, Rhyner launched the Your Dark Companion podcast under his new media company, Stolen Water Media, LLC, with his partner, Becca Moore. Shortly after, Stolen Water Media launched the Sunset Lounge DFW that hosts a network of podcasts: The Clubhouse Podcast, Beer 30 Sports O'Clock, Engel Angle, ¡Al Maximo! (a Spanish language sports podcast), Just Wondering...with Norm Hitzges, Signal 51 Chronicles (a true crime podcast), and Sunset Soccer Club

97.1 The Freak.[20]

== Personal life ==
Rhyner is divorced. He has a daughter named Jordan.

Rhyner is a band member of Petty Theft, a Tom Petty & the Heartbreakers tribute band. He also started a Byrds tribute band called the Nyrds and a Bob Dylan tribute band called Buick 6.
