= Purple Rain =

Purple Rain may refer to:

- Purple Rain (film), a 1984 film starring Prince
  - Purple Rain (album), the soundtrack album by American recording artist Prince for the film
    - "Purple Rain" (song), the title track of the album by American recording artist Prince
    - Purple Rain Tour, Prince's 1984–1985 concert tour
  - Purple Rain (musical), a 2025 musical based on the 1984 film
- Purple Rain (band), a South Korean rock band
- Purple Rain (cocktail), an alcoholic cocktail
- purplera1n, a jailbreaking utility
- Purple Rain protest, a 1989 anti-apartheid protest in Cape Town

== See also ==
- Purple Reign (disambiguation)
- Purple Haze (disambiguation)
