= KSEY =

KSEY may refer to:

- KSEY (AM), a radio station (1230 AM) licensed to Seymour, Texas, United States
- KSEY-FM, a radio station (94.3 FM) licensed to Seymour, Texas
