= Purple Reign (disambiguation) =

Purple Reign is a mixtape by Future.

Purple Reign may also refer to:

== Books ==
- Purple Reign, biography of musician Prince originally published as Slave to the Rhythm.
- Purple Reign, book by Nestor Aparicio

== Society ==
- Purple Reign, real life female superhero in Seattle's Rain City Superhero Movement

== Sports ==
- The Purple Reign, Gem City Rollergirls
- Purple Reign defense strategies, Huskies coach Jim Lambright
- Purple Reign, 1985–1987 victories of Marion High School

== Music ==
- Purple Reign (girl group), briefly including member Victoria Monét
- Purple Reign (show), a Prince tribute act

== See also ==
- Purple Rain (disambiguation)
- Purple Reign in Blood, 2005 album by Fenix*TX
