= Dan McDowell =

American radio personality (born 1969)

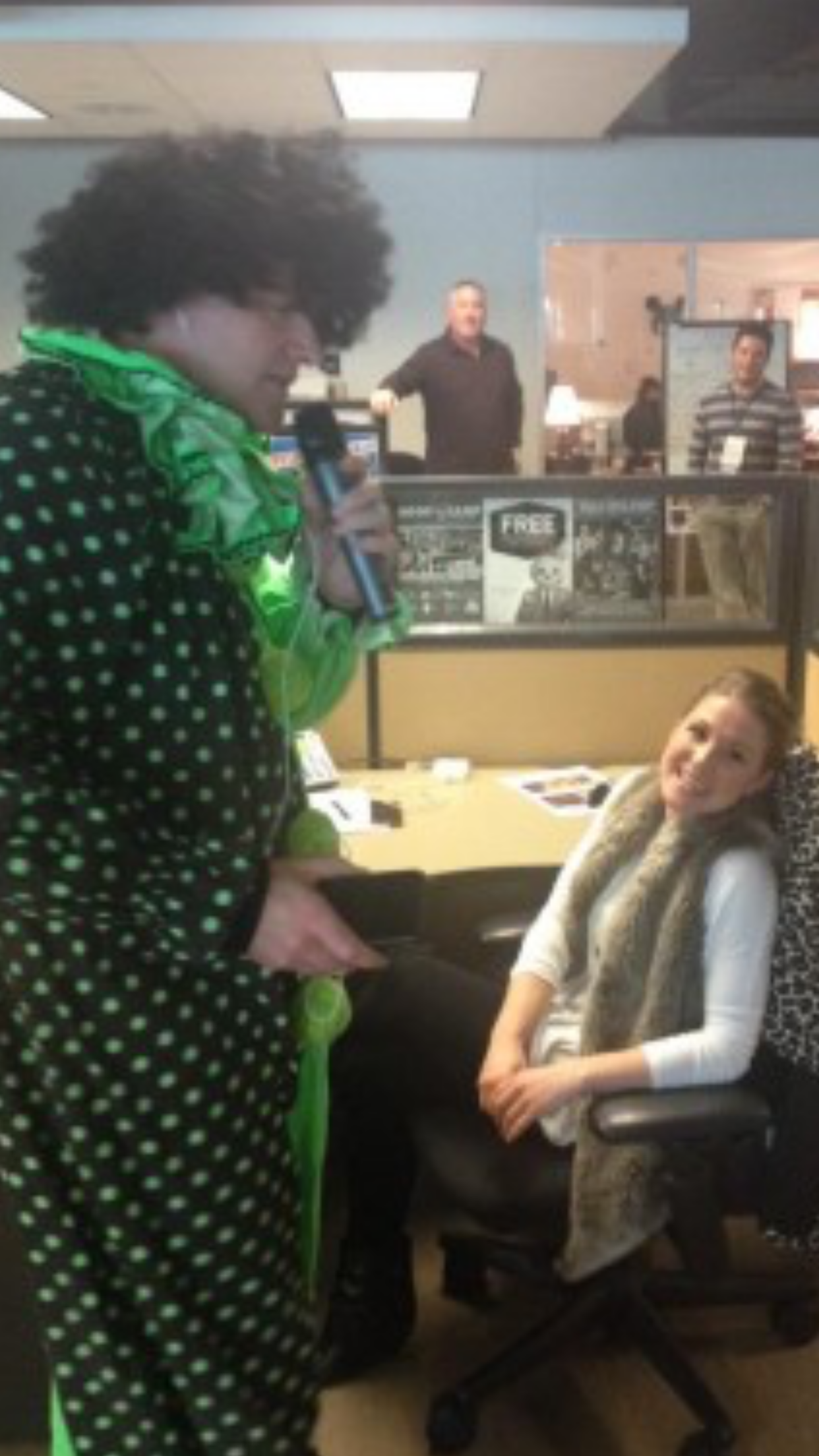
- McDowell (left) in 2014, dressed as a clown after a bet loss
- Born: Dan McDowell; March 3, 1969 (age 57); Cleveland, Ohio
- Education: Ohio University
- Spouse: Kathy McDowell
- Children: 2 Daughters
- Presenting career
- Show: The Hang Zone
- Station: 1310 KTCK (AM)/96.7 KTCK-FM
- Time slot: 12:00-3:00 PM
- Style: Sports Talk, Humor
- Country: United States
- Website: thehangzone.com

Dan McDowell is an American radio personality. Also known as "The Sports Fuhrer" and "Naughty Ben Franklin," McDowell co-hosted, until July 17, 2023, The Hang Zone with Jake “Kempanzee” Kemp on the sports radio station KTCK (AM)/KTCK-FM The Ticket in Dallas, Texas.

== Early life and education ==
McDowell was born in Cleveland, Ohio, and graduated from Ohio University.

== Career ==
McDowell started his radio broadcasting career in Ohio, doing play-by-play for WATH-AM 970 in Athens, Ohio. He was fired from the job due to a "Putting Down the Local Kids" segment. He moved through to Zanesville, Cleveland, Youngstown, and Dayton, Ohio before making his way to Dallas.

McDowell hosted a midday show in Youngstown, Ohio and eventually moved to the Dallas-Fort Worth area in 1999 to join Bob Sturm and The Ticket, together, they began on BaD Radio that same year.

In 2013, it was reported that McDowell and his co-host, Bob Sturm, would defect to rival station KRLD-FM after being offered a significantly larger contract. Ultimately McDowell stayed with The Ticket, citing the chemistry between hosts and damage that could be done to the station as his reasons for staying.

On February 10, 2020, it was announced that Bob Sturm would be leaving Bad Radio to Join Corby Davidson for the afternoon drive show on KTCK. It was also announced that Jake Kemp - the previous producer of the show - would join Mcdowell hosting daily 12–3.

On July 17, 2023 Dan and Jake resigned from KTCK due to a breakdown in contract negotiations.

McDowell and Kemp, along with fellow Ticket-alum Blake Jones, now produce The Dumbzone podcast.

== Controversies ==
=== Lee Corso Incident ===
McDowell has been part of many on air controversies at the Ticket, including in 2005, when American sports broadcaster and football analyst for ESPN Lee Corso was a guest on his show, and McDowell made an offhanded sexual joke about Corso that upset him, to which an argument ensued, and Corso called McDowell a 'big jerk."

== Adolf Hitler obsession ==
On several occasions, McDowell has expressed an obsession over Nazi leader Adolf Hitler. McDowell will occasionally make offhanded jokes and remarks about Hitler.

== Homer call of the week ==
"Homer Call of the Week" is a segment, co-created in 2000 by McDowell and Bob Sturm, on BaD Radio, that occurs during the football season. "Homer Call"s success led to the creation of the recurring segment, BaD Radio Reports, in 2006 to provide comedic content during the NFL offseason.

Every week, four recent over-the-top sports play-by-play broadcast moments from around the world are nominated for "Homer Call of the Week." They are played, and then the hosts and crew vote on one Homer Call that deserves to move on directly to Homer Call playoffs, and one that deserves to go to the Wildcard round. At the end of the season, the winners and wildcard candidates face off in a Homer Call playoff, until ultimately one Homer Call is deemed "Homer Call of the Year."

Some broadcasters reject their homerism and resent BaD Radio for inclusion of their audio clips in the segment, requiring Ticket staff to ask for audio for a fake segment called "Great Play-by-Play of the Week". Notably, George Dunham joined BaD Radio on-air and complained of his inclusion, noting he wasn't "screaming like a bunch of hyenas."

== Personal life ==
McDowell currently lives in the Dallas-Fort Worth suburb of Southlake, Texas with his wife Kathy, and two daughters Eva (23–24) and Eden (22).

== Awards ==
McDowell and his colleagues at KTCK have been nominated for, and received several NAB Marconi Radio Awards
