= KNTU =

Radio station at McKinney, Texas

- McKinney, Texas; United States
- Broadcast area: Dallas–Fort Worth–Denton
- Frequency: 88.1 MHz (HD Radio)
- Branding: 88.1 Indie

Programming
- Language: English (primary)
- Format: Alternative
- Subchannels: HD2: Jazz "88.1 The One"
- Affiliations: 24/7 News Network & NBC News Radio (national news partnership)

Ownership
- Owner: University of North Texas

History
- First air date: October 31, 1969 (at 88.5)
- Former frequencies: 88.5 MHz (1969–1979)
- Call sign meaning: North Texas State University

Technical information
- Licensing authority: FCC
- Facility ID: 69003
- Class: C1
- ERP: 55.0 kW
- HAAT: 135 meters
- Transmitter coordinates: 33.290059°N 97.136540°W

Links
- Public license information: Public file; LMS
- Webcast: Listen live
- Website: 88.1 Indie.com; KNTU Jazz (HD2)

KNTU (88.1 FM) is the radio station owned and operated by the University of North Texas. The signal of the station covers much of the Dallas–Fort Worth metroplex with an indie alternative format.

KNTU also produces the UNT football and men's basketball broadcast feeds for the Mean Green Sports Network, a radio property of Learfield for broadcast on commercial stations. Women's basketball moved to streaming only on Learfield's Varsity App beginning with the 2022–23 season.

== History ==
KNTU was founded in 1969 in part by Bill Mercer, former voice of the Dallas Cowboys, North Texas Mean Green, and a member of the Texas Radio Hall of Fame. Originally on the 88.5 FM frequency, the station officially went on the air on October 31, 1969. Along with music, Mean Green football game broadcasts were soon added, with Mercer providing play-by-play coverage and UNT students usually serving as his color commentators.

The station switched to a jazz format in 1981, while continuing to host public affairs shows and North Texas athletic events. While KNTU had no direct competitors, it shared audiences with 106.1 from 1987 to 1992 and 107.5 from 1992 to 2006 (both with the KOAI callsigns) as smooth jazz-formatted stations branded "The Oasis."

On July 29, 2022, KNTU switched to an alternative format, "88.1 indie," reflecting the station's independent status. The first song was "Icky Thump" by the White Stripes. The jazz format continues to stream online, and is broadcast on 88.1 HD-2.

The latest format flip puts KNTU in competition with North Texas Public Broadcasting's Adult album alternative-formatted KKXT (91.7), Audacy-owned KVIL (Alt 103.7), iHeartMedia's active rock-formatted KEGL (97.1 The Eagle), and iHeartMedia-owned KEGL-HD2 (97.1 HD2 The Edge).

== Signal ==
Unlike most of the area's FM stations (like competitor KVIL) which transmit their signals from Cedar Hill, KNTU transmits its signal from north Denton on land owned by UNT, which was a Nike Missile Base. Therefore, KNTU's signal is much stronger in the Northern parts of the Dallas/Fort Worth Metroplex. The station installed a new antenna during the first week of November 2022.

== Notable former KNTU students ==
- George Dunham (KTCK The Ticket)
- Craig Miller (KTCK The Ticket)
- Sean Bass (Sports Director, KTCK The Ticket)
- Mark Followill (PxP Dallas Mavericks, FC Dallas)
- Dave Barnett (PxP Dallas Mavericks, San Antonio Spurs, Texas Rangers)
- Craig Way (Voice of the Texas Longhorns)
- Tommy Bonk (LA Times writer who coined the phrase "Phi Slama Jama")
- Mark "Hawkeye" Louis KSCS Morning Show Host - Country Radio Hall of Fame
