= WNST =

Sports radio station serving the Baltimore, Maryland area

Coordinates: 39°25′04″N 76°33′23″W

- Towson, Maryland; United States
- Broadcast area: Baltimore metropolitan area
- Frequency: 1570 kHz
- Branding: Baltimore's Local Sports Voice

Programming
- Language: English
- Format: Sports radio

Ownership
- Owner: Nestor Aparicio; (Nasty 1570 Sports, LLC)

History
- First air date: 1955
- Former call signs: WTOW (1955–1958); WAQE (1958–1967); WTOW (1967–1986); WFEL (1986–1993); WKDB (1993–1999)
- Call sign meaning: Ravens' Nest or; Nasty; We Never Stop Talking

Technical information
- Licensing authority: FCC
- Facility ID: 25523
- Class: B
- Power: 5,000 watts (day); 237 watts (night)

Links
- Public license information: Public file; LMS
- Webcast: Listen live
- Website: www.wnst.net

WNST (1570 kHz) is a sports radio station located in Towson, Maryland, near Baltimore. It is owned and operated by local sports media personality Nestor Aparicio through Nasty 1570 Sports, LLC.

WNST was the first 24-hour all sports radio station in Baltimore. The station features local programming from 6:00 a.m. to 8:00 pm. Monday - Friday. When the local programming is not on the air, there is a live feed of Fox Sports Radio.

WNST ignited a debate in the Baltimore area by arranging a "Free the Birds" rally at Camden Yards to protest the ownership of the Orioles by Peter Angelos. The rally took place on September 21, 2006, during a make-up game against the Detroit Tigers.

On March 30, 2011, it was reported that Jen Royle, a Baltimore sports reporter for WJZ-FM (105.7) filed a $800,000 defamation suit against Aparicio and two WNST hosts, Glenn Clark and Drew Forrester. Royle, who also worked for MASN, claims that Aparicio and the WNST hosts hurt her reputation with damaging statements about her professional and personal life. Aparicio's lawyer said the accusations are "baseless", and Aparicio denied wrongdoing in a blog entry. Royle later dropped the lawsuit.
