= KYCN =

- Wheatland, Wyoming; United States
- Frequency: 1340 kHz

Programming
- Format: Country music
- Affiliations: CBS News Radio, Westwood One

Ownership
- Owner: Smith Broadcasting, Incorporated
- Sister stations: KZEW

Technical information
- Licensing authority: FCC
- Facility ID: 60644
- Class: C
- Power: 250 watts unlimited
- Transmitter coordinates: 42°2′44″N 104°56′47″W
- Translator: K224DT 92.7 (Wheatland)

Links
- Public license information: Public file; LMS
- Webcast: Listen
- Website: wheatlandradio.com

KYCN (1340 AM) is a radio station broadcasting a country music format. Licensed to Wheatland, Wyoming, United States. The station is currently owned by Smith Broadcasting, Incorporated and features programming from CBS News Radio and Westwood One. KYCN is rebroadcast on FM translator K224DT at 92.7 MHz.

== History ==
The Federal Communications Commission (FCC) issued the original construction permit for KYCN to Pioneer Broadcasting, Inc. in late 1962, and the station officially went on the air on August 15, 1963. Since its inception, the facility has served as the primary news outlet for Wheatland and Platte County. Technical logs from the early 1970s confirm that the station has consistently operated as a low-power local outlet on 1340 kHz.

=== Ownership ===
The current licensee, Smith Broadcasting, Inc., acquired the station in the mid-1990s as part of an effort to maintain independent local radio in small Wyoming markets. Under the leadership of Kent Smith, the company integrated KYCN with sister station KZEW (FM), which signed on in 1984. Smith Broadcasting has historically focused on preserving local sports and community news rights in the face of larger regional consolidation.

== Progamming ==
KYCN maintains a Country Music format. The station serves as a regional affiliate for national networks, including CBS News Radio and Westwood One. On Sunday mornings, the station broadcasts a specialty music block titled "The Neon Beat", hosted by John Christopher, which features artists from the mid-20th century. Additionally, the station provides localized agricultural weather forecasts and maintains broadcast rights for Wheatland Bulldogs athletics.

=== Power ===
Stations on the six local AM channels (1230, 1240, 1340, 1400, 1450, and 1490 kHz) were historically mandated to broadcast at only 250 watts at all times. In the early 1980s, the FCC updated these rules to allow daytime power of up to 1,000 watts, but strict interference protections meant many small-market stations, including KYCN, maintained their original 250-watt configuration to avoid costly technical studies or equipment upgrades.
