= Justin F. Kimball High School =

School in Dallas, Texas, United States

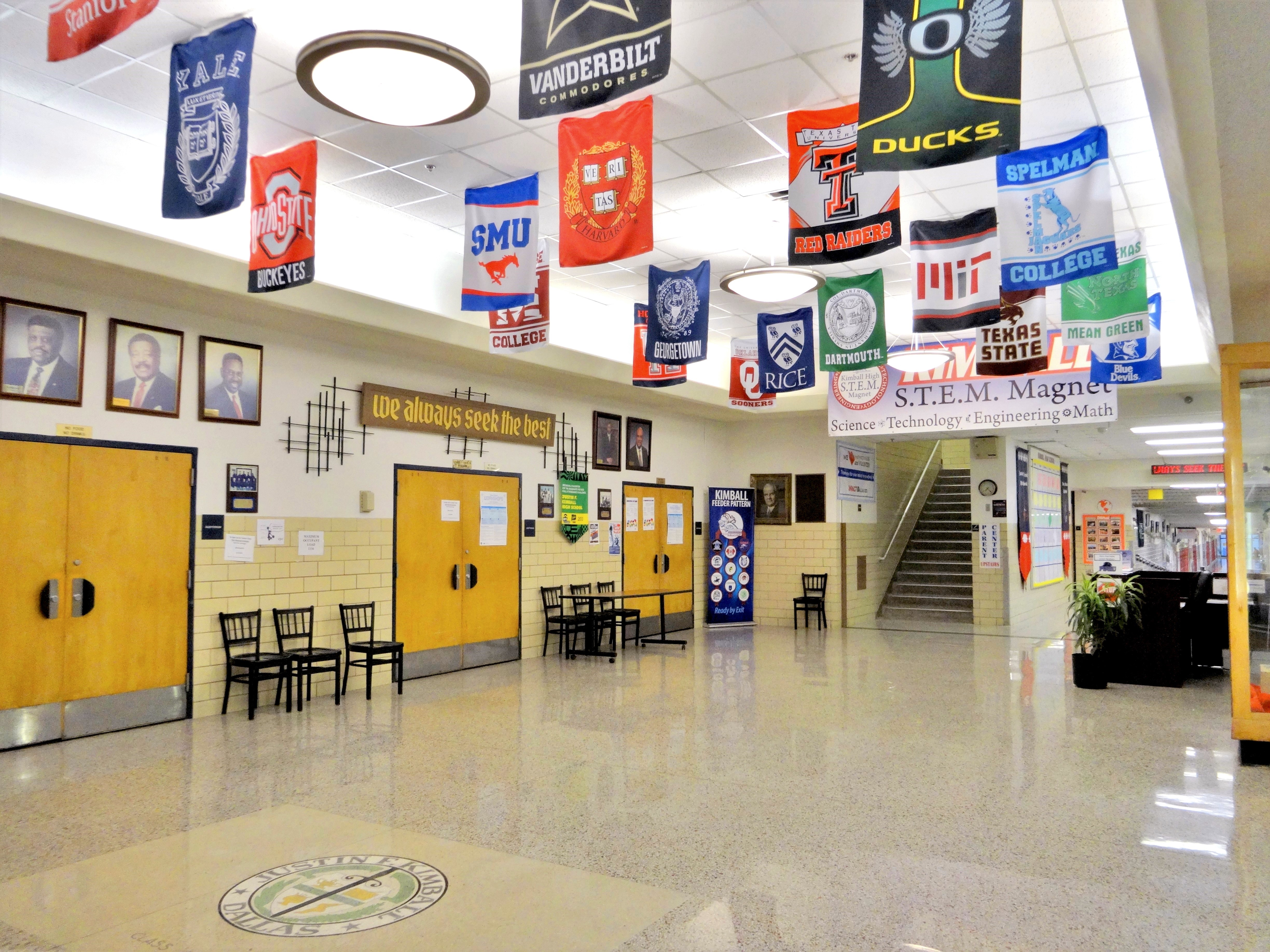
- Main lobby

Location
- 3606 South Westmoreland Road; Dallas, Texas 75233; United States; 32°41′57″N 96°52′40″W

Information
- Type: Public, secondary
- Motto: Optima Petimus (Latin: "We Always Seek the Best!")
- Established: 1958
- School district: Dallas Independent School District
- Principal: Llewellyn Smith
- Faculty: 83.79 (FTE)
- Grades: 9 - 12
- Enrollment: 1,255 (2023-2024)
- Student to teacher ratio: 14.98
- Color: Navy Blue red white
- Mascot: Knight
- Feeder schools: T.W. Browne Middle School
- Website: School website

Justin F. Kimball High School is a public secondary school in the Oak Cliff area of Dallas, Texas, United States. It enrolls students in grades 9–12, and is a part of the Dallas Independent School District. The school is named in honor of Justin Ford Kimball, a prominent citizen of Dallas, Texas, former school superintendent, and founder of a predecessor of the Blue Cross and Blue Shield Association. In 2015, the school was rated "Met Standard" by the Texas Education Agency.

It serves a section of Cockrell Hill.

== History ==
Kimball opened its doors in 1958, graduating its first class in 1960 with 165 students. Dr. W.P. Durrett served as the founding principal of the school. His tenure of 16 years ran from 1958 until his retirement in 1974, and was longer than that of any subsequent principal. Through his inspiring and dynamic leadership, the student body established the traditions and values of the school. An annual scholarship award in his name is granted each year by the Kimball Alumni Association to two outstanding students who demonstrate academic and leadership success.

Although Dallas ISD began integrating high school campuses in the 1965–1966 school year, Kimball's student body was primarily Caucasian until the late 1970s. The ethnic makeup of the student body changed gradually during the 1980s, and by 1990 Kimball's students were almost entirely Black. Today, Kimball is roughly 70% Hispanic and 30% Black. When Moisés E. Molina High School opened in 1996, attendance boundaries were redrawn, and many areas that had attended Kimball for decades were rezoned to the new school.

Since its founding in 1958, the school has graduated over 20,000 students. Kimball graduates have contributed in many fields - athletics, politics, entertainment, music, health, business, cultural, arts, science, and engineering. A number of Kimball students have won appointments to various military service academies through the years.

In 2008, the school celebrated its fiftieth anniversary with a celebration hosted by the Kimball Alumni Association.

== Athletics ==
The Kimball Knights compete in the following sports:

- Baseball
- Basketball
- Cross country
- Football
- Golf
- Soccer
- Softball
- Swimming and diving
- Tennis
- Track and field
- Volleyball
- Wrestling

=== State Titles ===
- Boys Basketball
  - 1990(5A), 1996(5A), 1997(5A), 2011(4A), 2012(4A), 2014(4A), 2023(5A), 2025(4A/D1), 2026(4A/D1)
- Girls Soccer
  - 1983(5A), 1984(5A)

== Neighborly ==
Kimball High School has had a long and storied rivalry in sports with David W. Carter High School. The annual football game between the two is known as "The Oak Cliff Super Bowl".

== Controversy ==
In January 2020, a shooting incident occurred during a high school basketball game at the Davis Field House in Dallas. According to a press release from the Dallas Police Department, a fight broke out at the location at around 9:10 p.m., resulting in the shooting of an 18-year-old male. The individual was transported to a local hospital where they remained in critical condition the following night. The teams involved in the game were identified as South Oak Cliff High School and Justin F. Kimball High School.

In late March 2022, according to Dallas Weekly, a group of students from Justin F. Kimball High School in Dallas organized a walk-out to express their dissatisfaction with the quality of food being served in the school. The demonstration was initially planned and announced by students via an Instagram page, which had been documenting food-related issues at the school for several weeks, including mold found on sandwiches and discolored oranges.

== Notable alumni ==
- Michael Adams (2002) — former NFL player
- Steve Bartlett (1966) — U.S. Congressman (1983-1991), Mayor of Dallas (1991—1995)
- Parris Afton Bonds — New York Times Best Seller and cofounder of Romance Writers of America
- David Chalk (1968) — baseball player, first-round draft choice of California Angels
- Tim Choate (1973) — actor film and television actor
- Tashaun Gipson (2008) — NFL player for Jacksonville Jaguars, Cleveland Browns
- DeMarcus Granger (2005) – USA Today All-American, former NFL defensive tackle
- Brandon Harrison (1990) — football player, University of Illinois (1995), 4th-round pick for San Diego Chargers
- Bob Johnson — MLB player for Texas Rangers
- Jalen Jones (born 1993) - basketball player for Hapoel Haifa in the Israeli Basketball Premier League
- Don King (1982) — Green Bay Packers quarterback (1987)
- Acie Law (2003) — NBA player for Atlanta Hawks
- Ken Lacy (1979) — former NFL player
- Sheryl Stamps Leach (1970) — creator of famous children's purple dinosaur "Barney"
- Belita Moreno (1968) — actress, best known for playing Benita "Benny" Lopez on George Lopez
- Marquis Pleasant — former NFL player (Cincinnati Bengals)
- Mike Rhyner — former radio host of The Hardline on KTCK
- Quinton Ross (1999) — former NBA player for Dallas Mavericks
- Jeryl Sasser (1997) — former NBA player, played for Bnei HaSharon of Israeli basketball league
- Jason Sasser (1992) — former NBA player
- Chad Slaughter (1995) — former NFL player
- Phillip Tanner (2006) — former NFL player for Dallas Cowboys
- Stephen Tobolowsky (1969) — Tony Award-nominated actor
- Stevie Ray Vaughan — Rock and Roll Hall of Fame musician & 6-time Grammy winner
- B. J. Ward (2000) — former NFL player
- Marvin Washington (1984) — former NFL player San Francisco 49ers, Denver Broncos, and New York Jets
- Todd Whitten (1983) — head football coach, Sam Houston State University
- Charles Woods (2018) - NFL defensive back for Los Angeles Rams
