= Nestor Aparicio =

American sports writer and radio personality (born 1968)

Nestor Aparicio (born October 14, 1968), known by the nickname "Nasty Nestor," is an American sports writer and radio personality.

Aparicio was born and raised in Dundalk, Maryland. He is Venezuelan-American, and the first cousin, once removed of former Major League Baseball shortstop Luis Aparicio, as his father is a first cousin of Luis Aparicio. He began as a sports writer at The Evening Sun edition of The Baltimore Sun where he continued as a sportswriter and music critic from 1986 until 1992. Starting in 1992 at WITH-AM 1230, Aparicio began doing daily sports talk radio both in Baltimore and later for three years at Sporting News Radio in national-syndication with 425 cities across the USA. He retired from daily radio in 2004 to concentrate on running the WNST radio station and website, which he owns and operates as Nasty 1570 Sports, LLC.

== Free the Birds ==
2006 marked the Baltimore Orioles ninth straight losing season, causing much of the Baltimore fan base to become disgruntled with the team's ownership. A grass-roots movement called "Free the Birds" was spearheaded by Aparicio.

For several weeks, WNST aggressively promoted a protest rally that was to take place against the Detroit Tigers at Oriole Park at Camden Yards. The protest was not so much aimed towards the team itself, as it was the club's owner, Peter G. Angelos. According to the Associated Press (AP), during the fourth inning of the game, at exactly 5:08 p.m., Aparicio led a "walkout", with the protest fans leaving the game in unison. The precise time of departure, 5:08, was significant in that "5" stood for Brooks Robinson's number and "8" for the number worn by Cal Ripken Jr. Many of the protesters wore black T-shirts that read "Free the Birds", a phrase that was chanted loudly through the walkout. Aparicio estimated that 2500 fans were involved in the protest, but the Associated Press gave a figure of 1000.

After the walkout, Aparicio was quoted in the AP by saying, "We have a chance to make a memorable civic statement about how we, as fans, are fed up with the embarrassment that the Orioles have become." Peter Angelos had a different take on the rally. "Whoever joins that protest has no comprehension of what it costs to run a baseball team," Angelos said. Referring to Aparicio, Angelos added, "he is a very unimportant person who has delusions of grandeur."

In the weeks following the protest, Aparicio created a website in honor of the rally, and declared to his listeners that he would form a union in protest of Angelos and his ownership of the franchise. Aparicio likened it to what "many of those in those asbestos lawsuits did a generation earlier" (a knock on the litigation that led to Angelos' success as a trial attorney). "And what could Peter Angelos possibly say to disparage the same kind of union that made him a wealthy man", said Aparicio after launching his website.

== Disputes ==
Aparicio was videotaped attempting to strangle Gordon Keith of KTCK-AM The Ticket in Dallas while covering Super Bowl XLIII in January 2009. The two were separated and police were called. The year before, Nestor reportedly called a member of The Ticket a "[expletive] Jew" during Super Bowl week.

On March 30, 2011, it was reported that Jennifer Royle, a Baltimore sports reporter for WJZ-FM (105.7) filed a $800,000 defamation suit against Aparicio and two WNST hosts, Glenn Clark and Drew Forrester. Royle, who also worked for MASN, claims that Aparicio and the WNST hosts hurt her reputation with damaging statements about her professional and personal life. Aparicio's lawyer said the accusations are "baseless", and Aparicio denied wrongdoing in a blog entry. Royle later dropped the lawsuit.

== Published works ==
- Aparicio, Nestor (2001). Purple Reign - Diary of a Raven Maniac. Nasty. ASIN B000YL7U1W.
- Aparicio, Nestor (2013). Purple Reign 2 - Faith, Family & Football. WNST. ASIN B00CWIC9Z2.
