= KVDT =

Radio station in Allen, Texas

- Allen, Texas; United States
- Broadcast area: Dallas–Fort Worth metroplex
- Frequency: 103.3 MHz

Programming
- Language: English
- Format: Christian radio
- Network: VCY America

Ownership
- Owner: VCY America; (VCY America, Inc.)

History
- First air date: December 1, 1981
- Former call signs: KEMM (1981–2001); KESN (2001–2022)
- Former frequencies: 92.1 MHz (1981–2000)
- Call sign meaning: VCY Dallas, Texas

Technical information
- Licensing authority: FCC
- Facility ID: 58265
- Class: C
- ERP: 98,000 watts
- HAAT: 606 meters (1,988 ft)
- Transmitter coordinates: 33°32′08″N 96°49′54″W

Links
- Public license information: Public file; LMS
- Webcast: Listen live
- Website: www.vcy.org

KVDT (103.3 FM) is a non-commercial radio station licensed to Allen, Texas, United States, and serving the greater Dallas–Fort Worth metroplex. It carries Christian radio programming as an owned and operated outlet of VCY America.

KVDT has an effective radiated power (ERP) of 98,000 watts. The transmitter site is on FM 902 southeast of Collinsville, Texas, in Grayson County. The signal covers the northern parts of the Dallas–Fort Worth metroplex and North Texas as well as Southern Oklahoma.

== History ==
=== Early beginnings ===
The station first signed on the air on December 1, 1981. The call sign was KEMM. From 1981-2000, the station was licensed to Commerce, Texas, broadcasting on 92.1 MHz with a country music format.

In 2000, KEMM was acquired by ABC/Disney. It went silent on September 28, 2000. This was in preparation of a move to the more lucrative Dallas market, to become the home for ESPN Radio programming.

=== ESPN Radio 103.3 ===
The city of license was switched to Allen and the transmitter was relocated to Collinsville in 2001. The station was re-launched on April 27, 2001, as 103.3 KESN with a new sports radio format. Fourteen outlying stations were rearranged and relocated to make way for KESN to move into DFW, all at ABC/Disney's expense. Among KESN's most notable local programs was Galloway and Company, hosted by Randy Galloway until his retirement in October 2013.

Despite different owners and a merger of ABC Radio into Citadel Broadcasting, KESN, WBAP, and WFAA-TV maintained a strong partnership (as WFAA is the local ABC television affiliate). In early 2006, 103.3 ESPN welcomed WFAA-TV personality Dale Hansen, a former Dallas Cowboys radio analyst and host on rival station KTCK, to the station. KTCK had become the Cowboys' flagship station, and many speculated that Hansen leaving KTCK for KESN was due to his criticism of the team. The official explanation, however, was that Hansen's ratings did not justify his salary request.

Beginning in the 2011 Major League Baseball season, KESN and KZMP acquired the rights to broadcast all Texas Rangers baseball games for the next four years. English-language broadcasts aired on KESN while the Spanish-language broadcasts were heard on KZMP. These broadcasts were in addition to the Dallas Mavericks broadcasts that were already heard on KESN. Rangers games remained on KESN until the 2015 season, when they returned to KRLD-FM.

Until mid-2011, KESN broadcast in HD Radio, with its HD2 signal simulcasting KZMP (ESPN Deportes Radio) and its HD3 substation broadcasting an audio simulcast of ESPNews. The HD broadcasts were later discontinued. Because the license to broadcast digital HD Radio is perpetual, the station could resume digital broadcasts at any time.

==== LMA with Cumulus ====
On August 7, 2013, it was announced that Cumulus Media, owner of KESN's rival KTCK, would take over operations of ESPN 103.3 through a long-term local marketing agreement (LMA) with Disney, beginning on October 8. Programming on both stations would remain the same. The change took effect once Cumulus closed on the sale of FM station KTDK 104.1 of Sanger to Whitley Media. However, on September 20, 2013, the Federal Communications Commission (FCC) rejected the sale citing that the license transfer was not a true sale in that all economic risk would remain with Cumulus as Whitley would get the same brokerage fee regardless of the price the station would have sold for. Cumulus would remain the de facto owner of the station. Eventually, the license of KTDK 104.1 was cancelled, and its call sign was deleted by the FCC on October 18, 2013, at the request of Cumulus.

In 2015, KESN became the only Disney/ABC-owned station on FM. Former sister station KZMP (1540 AM) aired Spanish language sports programming until September 2016, when it was flipped to a regional Mexican format. The change left the DFW market without an ESPN Deportes Radio affiliate until its re-affiliation in July 2018. ESPN Deportes Radio discontinued its radio broadcasts in September 2019.

==== End of Cumulus LMA ====
All local programming on KESN, with the exception of the Dallas Mavericks games, ended on October 7, 2020, following the expiration of the LMA with Cumulus. The station then began broadcasting only ESPN Radio network programming, with no local shows, except for Dallas Mavericks games. Prior to the end of local programming on KESN, share ratings for KESN's primary shows lagged behind that of rival sports outlets KTCK-FM and KRLD-FM.

On August 23, 2021, iHeartMedia announced that, after 20 years on KESN, Dallas Mavericks game broadcasts would move to iHeart-owned mainstream rock station KEGL 97.1 The Eagle. (That station relaunched to a hybrid sports/hot talk format as "97.1 The Freak" on October 3, 2022). While the Mavericks previous contract with ESPN 103.3 ran through 2023, Mavericks owner Mark Cuban exercised an out clause in the contract triggered by the end of the LMA of KESN by Cumulus Media a year prior; the Mavericks would later move their radio broadcasts to KEGL.

=== Sale to VCY America ===
On December 21, 2021, Disney announced the company would sell KESN to Christian radio group VCY America for $9.25 million. The network filed to convert KESN to non-commercial operation upon the sale's closure. VCY America also owns KVCE in Lubbock, which makes KESN its second Texas station and continues VCY's nationwide expansion. Later in 2022, VCY added a third Texas station, KVLM in the Midland-Odessa region.

The sale was consummated on March 9, 2022, at which point the station joined the VCY America network at 10:30 pm. This changeover left the Dallas-Fort Worth area without an ESPN Radio affiliate. The station changed its call sign to KVDT on March 22, 2022. The call letters represent the VCY network and the words Dallas and Texas.

== Signal ==
Unlike most of the area's FM stations, which transmit their signals from Cedar Hill, KVDT transmits its signal from an area east of Collinsville. Therefore, KVDT's signal is much stronger in the northern parts of the Dallas–Fort Worth metroplex, including Dallas, Decatur, Denton, and McKinney.

The signal is also strong in cities further north and outside of the Metroplex such as Gainesville, Sherman, and Bonham, to as far north as Ardmore and Durant in Oklahoma. In Fort Worth and areas south of Dallas, the station's signal is considerably weaker, which has caused problems for some of its listeners in these areas, especially during the sports radio era where listeners were following live sporting events.

== Notable on-air staff ==
=== Former ===
- Tim Cowlishaw
- Randy Galloway
- Michael Irvin
- Nate Newton
- Marc Stein
