= KTDK =

Radio station in Sanger, Texas (1989–2013)

Coordinates: 33.536°N 96.832°W

Defunct on FM 104.1
- The Ticket's station logo used 2001-2013.
- Sanger, Texas; United States
- Broadcast area: Dallas-Fort Worth Metroplex; Sherman; Denison; Gainesville
- Frequency: 104.1 MHz

Programming
- Format: Defunct (was Sports radio)

Ownership
- Owner: Cumulus Media; (Susquehanna Radio Corp.)

History
- First air date: December 1, 1989 (36 years ago) (as KWSM)
- Last air date: October 7, 2013 (12 years ago)
- Former call signs: KWSM (1988–1997); KXIL (1997–1998); KXZN (1998–1999); KMRR (1999–2001)

Technical information
- Facility ID: 26146
- Class: C3
- ERP: 6,200 watts
- HAAT: 192 meters (630 ft)

KTDK was a radio station with studios located in Sanger, Texas, United States, formerly under ownership of Cumulus Media. Previously, they simulcast KTCK SportsRadio 1310 The Ticket.

== History ==
The station was granted a construction permit in 1988 as KWSM in Sherman, co-owned with KTXO (1500 AM, now KJIM); it began broadcasting in December 1989. In its early years, KWSM programmed a classic hits format. In 1993 the station moved its license to Sanger, near Denton, and moved into the Dallas-Fort Worth market; when the new facility signed on in 1994, KWSM changed its format to classic country music. From 1997 to 1999, 104.1 saw several callsign changes beginning with a change to KXIL. A year later, Susquehanna Radio Corporation acquired the station, changed callsigns to KXZN and simulcast KKZN "93.3 The Zone" (classic rock). The following year, 104.1 changed callsigns again to KMRR in accordance with 93.3's change to an adult alternative format, KKMR "Merge 93.3" (that station is now a simulcast of Newstalk 820 WBAP).

In May 2001, 104.1 changed callsigns to KTDK and converted to a full-time simulcast of KTCK for the northern portion of the Metroplex. This arrangement continued for the remaining 12 years of 104.1's operation, even after Susquehanna Radio's merger with Cumulus Media in 2005 and Cumulus' acquisition of Citadel Broadcasting in 2011. In 2013, Cumulus announced that it reached a local marketing agreement with Disney's KESN ESPN 103.3. For the deal to happen, Cumulus sold KTDK to Whitley Media for $100. The deal called for Cumulus to continue operating KTDK under a time brokerage agreement. However, on September 20, 2013; the Federal Communications Commission rejected the sale. The FCC ruled that since part of the sale's proceeds would go towards reimbursing Whitley for operating costs, Cumulus would retain all economic risk for operating the station. It also ruled that Cumulus would have realized nearly all profit or loss if Whitley were to sell KTDK to a third party. Therefore, the FCC determined that the sale to Whitley was a straw purchase in which Cumulus would remain the de facto owner of KTDK.

On October 7, 2013, the simulcast of KTCK was dropped so that Cumulus' LMA of KESN could take effect the following day. The simulcast moved to WBAP-FM 96.7. On October 16, it was revealed that Cumulus returned the KTDK license to the FCC on the same day. The station’s call letters have been deleted and the allocation became available in a spectrum auction. A construction permit was granted for a class C3 FM station on November 3, 2021, for KTCG of Sanger. KTCG of Sanger was granted a license on October 13, 2022, to transmit with an effective radiated power of 6,200 Watts from a radiation center 181 meters above ground at 33-28-47.7 N 97-3-23.5 W. KTCG is owned by Radio Brands, Inc.

As of April 2016, the 104.1 frequency has been utilized by a few low-powered stations such as KEJC-LP in Dallas, KYRE-LP in Mansfield, and KLEJ-LP in Fort Worth; all broadcasting at 100 watts. There are other applications on file with the FCC for more Low Power FM stations within the Dallas/Fort Worth area on this particular frequency.
