= Purple Haze (disambiguation) =

"Purple Haze" is a 1967 song by The Jimi Hendrix Experience.

Purple Haze may also refer to:

== Film and television ==
- Purple Haze (film) a 1982 dramedy about a young man expelled from school and subsequently drafted to fight in Vietnam
- Purplehaze, one of 17 colors of the Sonochrome spectrum of pre-tinted film stocks introduced by Kodak
- "Purple Haze" (Eureka), an episode of Eureka TV series

== Brands and drugs ==
- Purple Haze (beer), an American beer
- Purple Haze (cannabis), a high-potency strain of Cannabis sativa

== People ==
- Purple Haze, a ring name of American professional wrestler Mark Lewin
- Alter ego and alias of Dutch DJ Sander van Doorn

== Military ==
- Purple Haze, an expanded version of the Vietcong (video game)

== Music ==
- Purple Haze (a cappella group), a choir at Northwestern University
- Purple Haze (album), a 2004 album by rapper Cam'ron
- "Purple Haze" (Groove Armada song), from the 2002 album LoveBox
- "Purple Haze", a song by DJ Kay Slay and Cam'ron from the album Diplomatic Immunity and The Streetsweeper, Vol. 1

== Manga ==
- Purple Haze, the Stand of Pannacotta Fugo from the fifth part of JoJo's Bizarre Adventure, Golden Wind

== See also ==
- Trapped in a Purple Haze, a TV movie
- Haze (disambiguation)
