= Burton Gilliam =

American actor

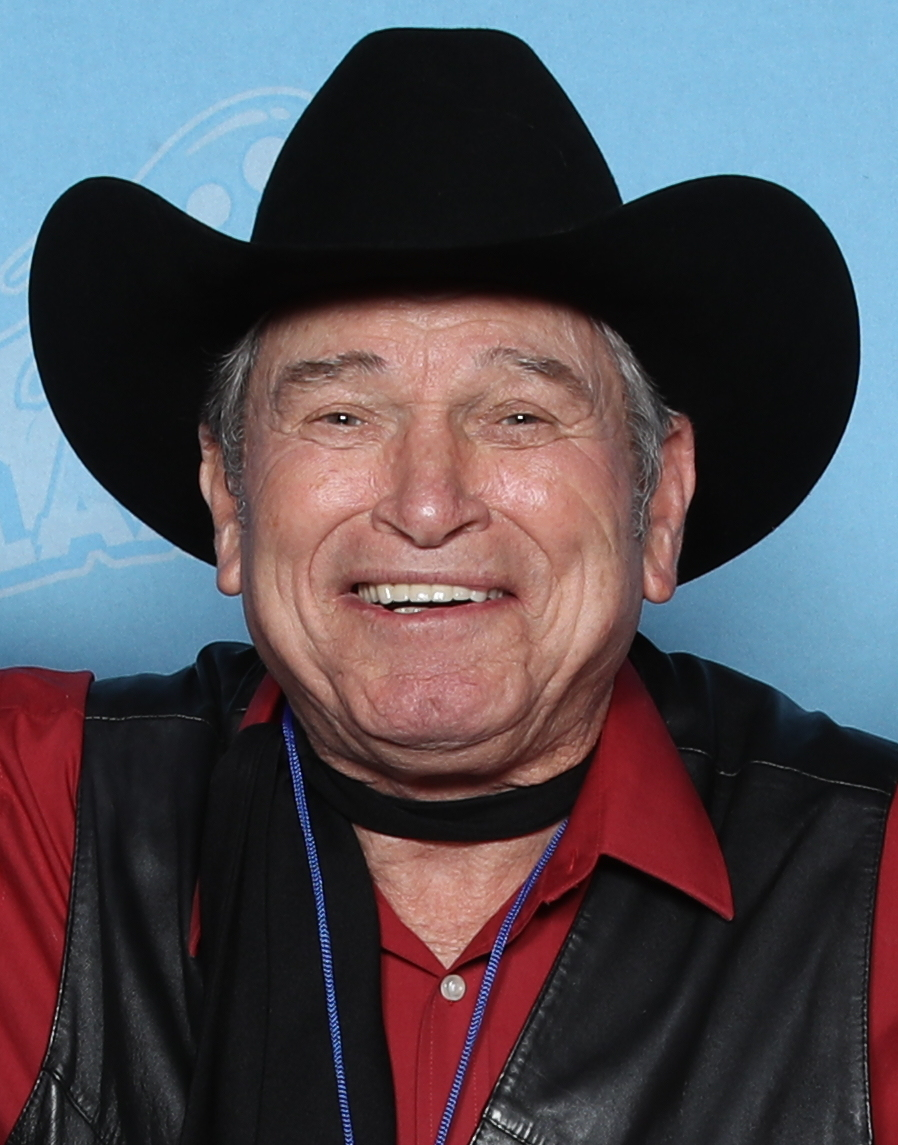
- Gilliam at the 2019 GalaxyCon Raleigh
- Born: August 9, 1938 (age 87); Dallas, Texas, U.S.
- Occupation: Actor
- Years active: 1973–present
- Spouse: Susan Gilliam
- Children: 2
- Relatives: Hollie Vise (granddaughter)

Burton Gilliam (born August 9, 1938) is an American actor. He is best known for memorable roles in several popular 1970s movies such as Blazing Saddles and Paper Moon, as well as comedic cameos in Back to the Future, Part III (1990) and Honeymoon in Vegas.

== Biography ==
=== Career ===
Before acting, Gilliam was a member of the Coast Guard's boxing team, where he won 201 out of 217 fights. He remained in the boxing world for decades, working as a referee in California.

While working as a firefighter for the city of Dallas, Gilliam appeared in the role of "Floyd", the desk clerk, in the film Paper Moon. He then went on to appear in such popular movies as Blazing Saddles and Back to the Future Part III. Performing in Blazing Saddles was difficult for him, since he played a despicable racist who repeatedly hurls racial insults (including "nigger") at the black characters, especially the hero, played by Cleavon Little. Gilliam was so uncomfortable with his use of that slur that he apologized to Little, who had to remind him that it simply was a word in the script and that the racial insults were treated unambiguously negatively since he was playing a villain. Gilliam was also embarrassed by being the main protagonist in the infamous campfire (eating baked beans and farting) scene.

Gilliam also has had roles in movies such as Honeymoon in Vegas, Thunderbolt and Lightfoot, Farewell, My Lovely (1975 film), Fletch, Gator, Telefon and The Terror Within II. His television appearances include Alice, Charlie's Angels, Mama's Family, The A-Team, The Dukes of Hazzard and The Fall Guy, and he appeared as a regular on Evening Shade.

=== Personal life ===
Gilliam was born in Dallas, Texas. He lives with his wife, Susan, in Allen, Texas, just north of Dallas. He has two children and four grandchildren and two great-grandchildren. His granddaughter Hollie Vise is an American former world champion artistic gymnast.

Gilliam graduated from Woodrow Wilson High School in 1956 and was inducted into the school's hall of fame in 2004. In 2018, he was the grand marshal of the Dallas St. Patrick's Day parade.

== Filmography ==
=== Films ===
- 1973 Paper Moon as Floyd, Desk Clerk
- 1974 Blazing Saddles as Lyle
- 1974 Thunderbolt and Lightfoot as Welder
- 1975 At Long Last Love as Man At Racetrack
- 1975 Farewell, My Lovely as Cowboy
- 1975 Hearts of the West as Lester
- 1975 The Night That Panicked America as "Tex"
- 1976 Gator as "Smiley"
- 1977 Another Man, Another Chance as Sheriff Murphy
- 1977 Telefon as Gas Station Attendant
- 1978 The Beasts Are on the Streets as Al Loring
- 1979 The Jericho Mile as Jimmy-Jack
- 1982 Foxfire Light as Deke
- 1985 Fletch as Bud
- 1986 Uphill All the Way as Corporal
- 1987 The Girl
- 1987 The Underachievers as "Red"
- 1988 Red River as Buster
- 1990 Back to the Future Part III as Elmer H. Johnson, Colt Gun Salesman
- 1991 The Terror Within II as Dewitt
- 1992 Quake as Willie
- 1992 Honeymoon in Vegas as Roy Bacon, Elvis Impersonator
- 1994 The Getaway as Gollie
- 1995 Wild Bill as Lynch
- 1995 Born to Be Wild as Dwayne
- 1999 Soccer Dog: The Movie as The Mail Man
- 2001 The Journeyman as Silas Bishop
- 2002 Mi Amigo as Older Pal Grisham
- 2002 An Eye for Detail as Professor William Seymore
- 2003 Sweet Hideaway as Detective Dick Johnson
- 2003 88 Hits as Victor Bordeaux
- 2003 Shtickmen as Ray Sellers
- 2005 Drop Dead Sexy as "Big Tex"
- 2006 Killing Down as Turner
- 2007 Cake: A Wedding Story as Judge
- 2009 Fire from Below as Bubba
- 2010 Breaking the Press
- 2012 Shattered Dreams V as Daddy
- 2012 Return to Vengeance as Leonard
- 2014 The Wisdom to Know the Difference as Jesse
- 2017 The Lucky Man as Pawn Broker's Dad

=== Television ===
- 1980 The Girl, the Gold Watch & Everything as Hoover Hess
- 1981 The Girl, the Gold Watch & Dynamite as Hoover Hess III
- 1986 North and South Book II as Corporal Strock
- 1986 Dream West as Martineau
- 1990-1994 Evening Shade as Virgil
- 1997 The Love Bug as Mechanic Race Announcer

=== TV guest appearances ===
- 1975 The Waltons as J.D. Paulsen
- 1977 Charlie's Angels as Ulmer
- 1976-1978 Alice as Buford Baker / Jimmie Joe Castleberry
- 1979 Soap as Buck
- 1979 Young Maverick as Barbary Kid
- 1979 B. J. and the Bear as Lacy
- 1980 Flo as J.J. Castleberry
- 1979-1982 The Dukes of Hazzard as Heep / Tom Colt
- 1983 Knight Rider as Gene, Trucker
- 1983 Gun Shy as Jeremiah Jones
- 1983 The A-Team as Sheriff Jeff Lewis
- 1983 The Fall Guy as Sheriff
- 1985 Hail to the Chief as Clovis Montgomery
- 1987 Mama's Family as Bud
- 1995 Weird Science as "Snake"
- 1999 Sliders as Stage Driver
- 1999 Walker, Texas Ranger as Frank

=== Video games ===
- 1996 Redneck Rampage as Leonard (voice)
- 1998 Redneck Rampage Rides Again as Leonard (voice)
