= Haze (disambiguation) =

Haze is an atmospheric phenomenon.

Haze may refer to:

- Haze machine, device used in the entertainment industry to simulate the atmospheric phenomenon
- Turbidity, the cloudiness of a fluid or transparent solids, such as glass or plastic, as measured by the percentage of light that is deflected or attenuated
- Haze (optics), the scattering of light out of the regular direction during reflection or transmission
- Corneal opacification, central corneal opacification is a diagnostic "danger sign" in red eye (medicine)
- Hazing, a practice of harassment and initiation
- Hazing, to use voice, body and hand movements to scare away a wild animal

Haze may also refer to:

== In film ==
- Haze (2005 film), a 2005 Japanese thriller film written and directed by Shinya Tsukamoto
- Haze (2010 film), a 2010 Turkish film

== In gaming ==
- Haze (video game), PlayStation 3 video game developed by Free Radical Design released in 2008

== In music ==
- Haze (band), progressive rock band
- "Haze", song by nu-metal band Korn from their untitled album and featured in the video game, Haze
- ”Haze” song by 5 Seconds of Summer from 5SOS5
- ”Haze” song by Europe from Walk the Earth

== In literature ==
- Dolores Haze, the character after whose nickname Vladimir Nabokov's novel Lolita is named

== People ==
=== Surname ===
- Eric Haze, graffiti artist and designer
- Jenna Haze, American pornographic actress
- Jonathan Haze, American actor
- John Haze, also known as Doktor Haze, English circus owner and performer
- Scott Haze, American actor

=== Stage names ===
- Angel Haze, stage name of Raykeea Wilson, an American rapper
- Haze, stage name of Malaysian singer Harikrish Menon

== Other ==
- Haze (cannabis), an identifying name for a strain and a varieties of cannabis strains
- Haze, the NATO reporting name for the Soviet Mil Mi-14 military helicopter

== See also ==
- Purple Haze (disambiguation)
