= Justin Ford Kimball =

American businessman (1872–1956)

Justin Ford Kimball (August 25, 1872 – October 7, 1956) was an American businessman, educator, and inventor of the Blue Cross Group Hospital Insurance (now Blue Cross Blue Shield).

== Early life ==
Kimball was born to Justin A. Kimball and Elizabeth Kimball (née Ford) on a farm near Huntsville, Texas. He attended Mount Lebanon College in Louisiana in 1890. After graduation, he enrolled in Baylor University, where he graduated with an M.A. in 1899. He married Annie Lou Boggess in 1905 and had two sons and two daughters.

== Work in education ==
Kimball moved to Chicago to start postgraduate work at the University of Chicago, and also attended law school at the University of Michigan. He then moved to Louisiana and started work as a teacher in the rural schools. He then moved to Mexia, Texas, then Navasota, Texas, where he found jobs as a teacher until 1895, when he became principal in the small school system of Temple, Texas. In 1900, he was promoted to superintendent of the same school system.

Over the years, he established himself as a prominent education leader. His success in the schools prompted the Dallas Independent School District to hire him as general superintendent of Dallas ISD, and held that position from 1914 to 1924. His leadership role with Dallas ISD won him the position of president of the Texas State Teachers Association. He was also awarded an honorary doctorate from his alma mater, Baylor University. Kimball's overloaded schedule affected his health drastically, and he resigned from his position as superintendent after advice from his doctor. Kimball was the first superintendent to write a book called "Our City Dallas".

Despite his resignation from the school system in Dallas, he was immediately asked to perform lecture series at Baylor University, Southern Methodist University, the Peabody College for Teachers in Nashville, and the University of Texas. He accepted an education professorship at Southern Methodist University in 1925.

Kimball was later appointed vice-president of the cluster of Baylor health extensions in Dallas, including Baylor University Medical Center, Baylor College of Dentistry, Baylor College of Medicine, and the Baylor School of Nursing.

== Work in the medical industry ==
During his first year (1929) in office as vice-president of the Baylor health system, after noticing large amounts of unpaid bills, many belonging to Dallas educators, he developed a plan in which a person could prepay US$0.50 a month, or $6.00 per year to cover the cost of a 21-day stay at a hospital, effective beginning one-week into the hospital stay. Fees incurred within that first week would cost $5.00 per day above the prepaid coverage. This plan was adapted from the prepayment plans offered to workers in the railroad and lumber industries and eventually would become the predecessor of what is now the Blue Cross and Blue Shield Association.

His plan was popular amongst Dallas educators, with 75 percent of Dallas teachers enrolling. Employees of the Dallas Morning News and WFAA-TV and WFAA Radio also joined the program. The success rate of his plan prompted the American Hospital Association to ask Kimball to prepare a paper detailing the mechanics behind the program. Unable to attend himself, his paper was read and well received by A.H.A. members, leading to their designating him an honorary life member.

== Later years and death ==
In 1939, Kimball retired from his role as vice-president of the Baylor health system. He accepted a job as an adjunct professor at Southern Methodist University, lecturing about education administration. He later wrote Our Dallas (1927), a history book about the City of Dallas, which became popular among teachers, and was used for many years by primary schools in the city.

A Christian, Kimball also served as chairman of the civil service commission of the City of Dallas. From 1949 to 1952, he served on the Texas State Board of Education (now the Texas Education Agency).

Kimball worked on revising his book (Our Dallas) on his last years, as well as supervising and tending to his farms.

Kimball died at his Dallas home on October 7, 1956. Two years after his death, Dallas ISD named their newest high school, Justin F. Kimball High School, in his honor.
