= Shtickmen =

2006 mockumentary

Shtickmen is a mockumentary film about the life of struggling comedians, and the things they have to do to make a living. It stars Dean Lewis, Jeff Hays, Burton Gilliam, David Wilk and Gordon Keith. It was released in 2003 and subsequently received 5 awards at various festivals around the world. This led to a distribution deal with Blockbuster Video, where it was released in January 2006.
