= Dunham and Miller Show =

- Genre: Sports, Talk
- Running time: 3 hours (approximately)
- Country of origin: United States
- Home station: KTCK
- Starring: George Dunham; Craig Miller; Gordon Keith
- Produced by: Jacob Detamore
- Original release: Present
- Website: Official site

The Dunham and Miller Show is a morning drive-time radio show on KTCK The Ticket, broadcast in the Dallas-Fort Worth metroplex. The show, active since 1994, airs from 6:00 am to 9:00 am on weekday mornings. The Dunham and Miller Show features George Dunham and Craig Miller as the two primary sports hosts, along with Gordon Keith, who adds cultural and comedic commentary. The three hosts are collectively referred to as the Musers, and two of them have been called comic geniuses by Hector Saldana of the San Antonio Express-News. The show has been nominated for the prestigious Marconi Award on seven occasions. This seventh time they won the Marconi for Major Market Personality's of the Year 2021. They also have received the Dallas Observer's Best Local Sports Radio Show award for 2011.

== History ==
George Dunham and Craig Miller originally met at their alma mater, the University of North Texas, where they crossed paths during Freshman English. They later alternated hosting duties for show on a campus radio station before eventually moving on to their professional careers. The Dunham and Miller Show was one of the original shows aired on The Ticket when the station debuted in 1994 on 1310 AM in the Dallas-Fort Worth Metroplex. Dunham and Miller added Gordon Keith to their crew in 1995 and have maintained the same core of hosts ever since.

== Popularity ==
The Musers regularly post the highest ratings in Dallas radio among sports shows. In its "Best of Dallas 2011" article, the Dallas Observer noted, "Dunham & Miller are at this point basically lapping the field in Arbitron ratings. Every hour their show attracts twice the ratings as the offerings of ESPN-103.3 FM and KRLD-105.3 FM The Fan. Combined." Dunham and Miller have also been nominated for the Marconi award for National Major Market Personalities of the year two times; they then won the award for Sports Station of the year, along with the rest of The Ticket, in 2007. The program has been named Best Sports Talk Show by the Dallas Morning News, Fort Worth Star-Telegram, and Dallas Observer.

The show is known for its use of comedic impressions done by Dunham and Keith, accompanied by the dry humor of Miller. Popular characters have included a fake Jerry Jones, a fake Wade Phillips and a fake Bruce Bochy.

== Show schedule ==
Mon-Fri @ 6:15 am – Gordo's O-Deck
Mon-Fri @ 7:10 am – Muse in the News (featuring Gordon Keith )
Mon-Fri @ 8:40 am – 8:40 Bit
Tuesdays @ 8:50 am – Biggest Show Coming to Town
Fridays @ 7:30 am – Scatter Shooting
Fridays @ 7:50 am – Emergency Brake of the Week

== Current crew ==
=== Hosts ===
- George Dunham
- Craig Miller
- Gordon Keith

=== Producer ===
- Jacob Detamore

=== Board Operator ===
- Tyler Samsel

=== Ticket Tickers ===
- DJ Ringenberg
- Ryan Baldwin
