= Gordon Keith (radio host) =

American radio host

Gordon Keith is an American broadcaster on KTCK SportsRadio 1310 AM "The Ticket" in Dallas, Texas. He has shared hosting duties with George Dunham and Craig "Junior" Miller since 1994.

== Early life ==
Keith was born in Fort Worth, Texas. He then lived in Mississippi before returning to Texas to graduate from Richardson High School.

Keith was interested in John F. Kennedy's assassination and went so far as to buy Lee Harvey Oswald's bathtub from the estate of Oswald's wife, Marina, and then wrote loving words about it for his award-winning Dallas Morning News column.

== Television ==
- February 2007 to January 2009 – Host and Executive Producer – WFAA presents The Gordon Keith Show on WFAA (Channel 8, Dallas, Texas). Guests included Will Ferrell, Zach Galifianakis, Kristen Bell, and Jimmy Kimmel.
- October 2001 to March 2003 – Feature reporter on The Mark Cuban Show on KTVT (Channel 11) and KTXA (Channel 21).
- 2000 – The Ticket TV Show on KSTR
- April 1998 to September 2000 – Correspondent, Positively Texas on KTVT (Channel 11)
- 1997 – Correspondent, Texas Rangers broadcasts on Fox Sports Southwest and KXTX (Channel 39)
- 1996 – Feature reporter and writer, "Call It Like It Is – The Deion Sanders Show" on KDFW (Channel 4)
- 1995 – Feature reporter, The Ticket on TV show on KDFI (Channel 27)

== Voice ==
- 2000 – Voice of animated character "Chadsworth" (1 episode) in "Nana and Li'l Puss Puss" for DNA Productions
- 1998 – Voice of animated character "Sydney" (9 episodes) for children's program "Jingaroo" by DNA Productions

== Film ==
- 2003 – The role of Frank Sellers in 2003's indie feature Shtickmen.
- 2009 – Cameo role in 2009's indie short "The Keith Coogan Experience"

== Print ==
- 2012–Present columnist, Dallas Morning News
- 2005 to 2011 – Humor columnist, Quick DFW, a weekly newspaper from the publishers of The Dallas Morning News
- 2005 – Columnist, The Sports Page Dallas
- 2000 – Author, Buff Tanner: Total Man (Orez Publishing, 2000) ISBN 0-9677978-0-2, a parody of the self-help motivational industry
- 1999 to 2004 – Contributing Writer for the Dallas Observer
- 1997 – Buzz column with Lisa Davis, Fort Worth Star-Telegram

== Radio career ==
Keith has been with Dallas sports radio station KTCK ("The Ticket") since before the station went on the air in January 1994. His first position was an unpaid intern for Skip Bayless' morning show. According to Keith, the role lasted two weeks. He started working with Craig Miller and George Dunham on the Dunham and Miller Show, and joined the show as an on-air personality when it moved to mornings in October 1996.

He is known for his characters and celebrity impersonations, including Jerry Jones and Tiger Woods.

A long-running feud has existed between members of The Ticket and Nestor Aparicio, an American sports writer and radio personality. On January 30, 2009, during Super Bowl week in Tampa, Florida, while roaming the Radio Row with a wireless microphone, Keith approached Aparicio in an alleged attempt to bury the hatchet. Aparicio assaulted Keith before the scuffle was broken up by Super Bowl security. The incident was broadcast live during The Ticket's morning show.

== Television career ==
From February 2007 until January 2009, Keith hosted 100 episodes of The Gordon Keith Show, first on KFWD then on WFAA. The show won three Lone Star Emmy Awards before its cancellation due to layoffs at WFAA.

== In popular culture ==
The FX drama Justified makes frequent use of the names of "Ticket" personalities for supporting characters as writer/producer V.J. Boyd is a former Dallas resident and an active fan of KTCK. The sixth-season episode "Dark as a Dungeon" makes reference to Gordon Keith as Mary Steenburgen's character Katherine Hale recalls him as "beard, wouldn't shut up about Lee Harvey Oswald" and describes him as "kind of wheels off". The Gordon Keith character is unseen, a deceased mob assassin who links several other supporting characters together.

== Recognition ==
In July 2017, Gordon Keith won the "DFW's Favorite Broadcaster" tournament hosted by The Dallas Morning News.
