= John Clay Wolfe =

American radio host (born 1972)

- Born: August 28, 1972 (age 53)
- Occupations: radio personality, entrepreneur

John Clay Wolfe (born August 28, 1972) is an American radio personality and owner/founder of GiveMeTheVIN.com one of the largest online car buying websites, who resides in Fort Worth, Texas.

Wolfe also hosts a nationally syndicated radio show The John Clay Wolfe Show, broadcast coast to coast each Saturday morning on stations like 95.5 KLOS Los Angeles, Dallas–Fort Worth Lone Star 92.5, Houston 94.5 The Buzz, Washington DC BIG 100, Las Vegas 97.1 The Point, Colorados 103.5 The Fox, Tampa Bay 98Rock and numerous additional markets via syndication through (Westwood One). Wolfe broadcasts all of his live shows from a state-of-the-art private studio in Fort Worth, Texas. He pioneered both the purchase of live callers' automobiles sight-unseen over commercial radio airwaves and the sight-unseen purchase of cars via GivemetheVIN.com.

Alongside Greg Williams, Wolfe was co-host of syndicated sports radio show The Show with John Clay and Greggo. The Show aired on KSEY ("ESPN 1230AM") in Wichita Falls, Texas, and KPUR (1440 AM, "The Score") in Amarillo from December 2009 through the end of February 2010 when Williams left the show over a salary dispute. Wolfe also hosted a weekday lunch hour program "The Daily Nooner" on KFXR (1190 AM) in Dallas-Fort Worth.

Wolfe graduated from Southern Methodist University in Dallas, Texas in 1995 with a bachelor's degree in psychology. Wolfe worked his way through Southern Methodist University operating both his Fort Worth college hotspots, and concert promotion business. While at SMU, he began promoting concerts for names like Jack Ingram, Dave Mathews Band, Blues Traveler, and numerous others . Years later, Ingram is a regular on Wolfe's radio programs to date. In late 2004, he suffered a spinal cord injury during a moto-cross accident that left him paralyzed from the waist down, but has since regained his ability to walk unassisted.
