= KJIM =

Radio station in Sherman, Texas

- Sherman, Texas; United States
- Broadcast area: Sherman-Denison-North Dallas-Fort Worth Metroplex
- Frequency: 1500 kHz
- Branding: K-JIM AM 1500 - FM 101.3

Programming
- Format: Primary Adult standards Secondary: Classic hits/Soft adult contemporary
- Affiliations: Westwood One - America's Best Music; NOAA Weather Radio

Ownership
- Owner: Bob Mark Allen Productions, Inc.

History
- First air date: December 19, 1947 (as KTAN)
- Former call signs: KTAN (1947–1958); KTXO (1958–1991)
- Call sign meaning: Originally used for 870 KJIM

Technical information
- Licensing authority: FCC
- Facility ID: 21598
- Class: D
- Power: 1,000 watts Daytime Only
- Transmitter coordinates: 33°41′30″N 96°33′30″W
- Translator: 101.3 K267CB (Sherman)

Links
- Public license information: Public file; LMS

KJIM (1500 kHz) is a commercial AM radio station in Sherman, Texas. The station is owned by Bob Mark Allen Productions. KJIM airs a primary adult standards radio format featuring programming from America's Best Music, a service of Westwood One, and also airs secondary classic hits and soft adult contemporary formats. World and national news is heard every hour from CBS Radio News as well as a broadcast cycle of NOAA Weather Radio station WXK22. KJIM's studios, offices, and the transmitter are on Woodlawn Road in Denison, Texas.

Because AM 1500 is a clear-channel frequency reserved for WFED in Washington, D.C., and KSTP in St. Paul, Minnesota, KJIM is a daytimer and must sign-off at sunset. Programming is heard around the clock on FM translator K267CB at 101.3 MHz.

== History ==
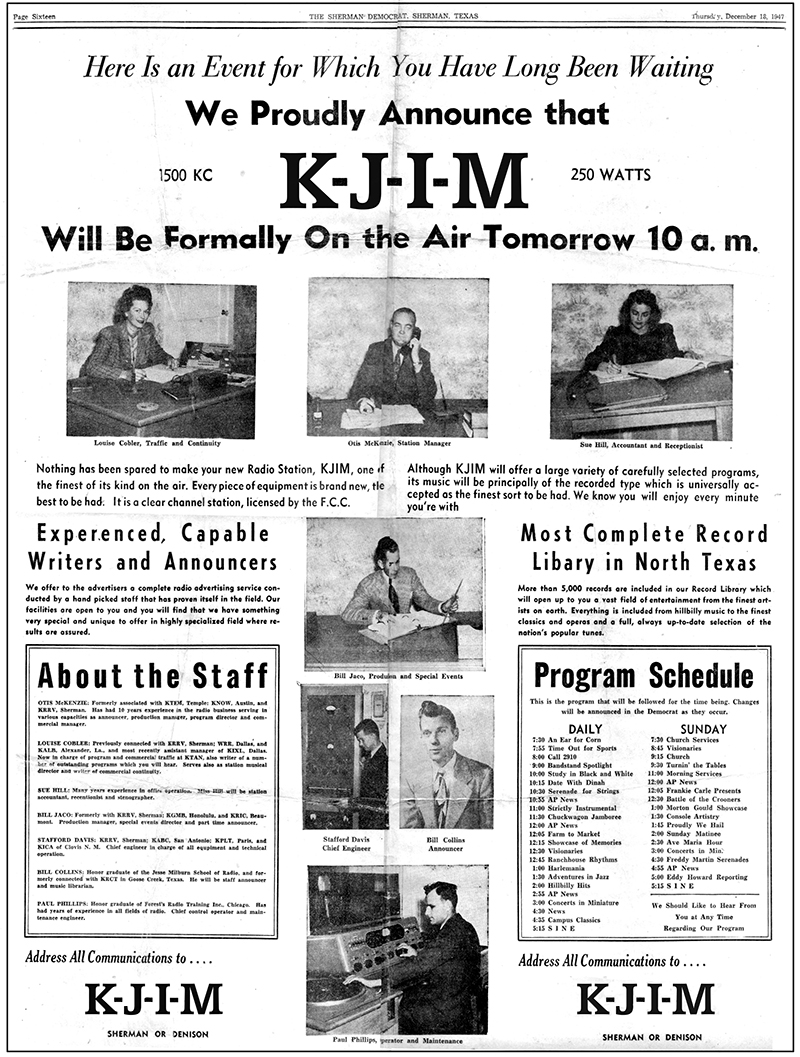
Advertisement announcing station's opening in 1947

KJIM originally held the call sign KTAN and was established on December 19, 1947. Its original format was Classical music. The owners were: Joe Carroll and Elmer Scarborough (1947–48), Tony Anthony, and E. T. Fant Jr (1948-?) Charles L. Cain (?-1953) Col. Howard L. Burris (1953–55; operated under an LMA to Howard Davis) Galen O. Gilbert (1955–57; Gilbert later owned KDNT-Denton) J. Lou Groves (1957; Groves was a theater operator) Senator William J. Samples (1957–58) and King Fisher/Jimmy Fisher/Harry O'Conner dba O'Conner Broadcasting (1958.) Programs: "An Ear for Corn" (morning show) "Concerts in Miniature" (hosted by Bill Jaco,) Notables: Bill Jaco (who was the first to broadcast on the station, and was PD) Otis McKenzie, Bill Collins, Louise Cobbler, Sue Hill, Paul Phillips, Stafford E. Davis. Located at 2024 N. US 75, south of US 82.

In 1958, the station adopted the call letters KTXO, and began airing a Country and Western format (one of the first Texas stations to go C&W). Its call letters stood for Texas and Oklahoma.

Owners: King Fisher/Jimmy Fisher/Harry O'Conner/Paul Carter dba O'Conner Broadcasting (1958–60) Bill Jaco and Tom Spellman (1960–69; Jaco was a disc jockey) Floyd Shelton (1969-?) Larry Henderson (co-owned with his wife). Notables: David Sprowl, John Scott, Bill Jaco, Gary King. Increased power to 1,000 watts in 1968. Sister station to KWSM. Located on US 75, south of US 82, then to the Grayson Bank Building, then to near the Woodlawn Country Club (1968–present).

On July 31, 1991, the station adopted the call letters KJIM and began airing an oldies format. The calls are taken from the longtime KJIM on 870 kHz in Fort Worth.

On September 22, 1995, Bob Allen dba Bob Mark Allen Productions, Inc. became a licensee after the transfer of ownership was approved by the FCC. "Bobbin'" Bobby Allen began his radio career in Oklahoma City in the 1950s. He later worked on air at a number of stations in the Midwest including, KIOA and KSO in Des Moines, Iowa; KRMG and KELI in Tulsa, Oklahoma. Allen later became a well-known Top 40 DJ and talk show host in Fort Worth, Texas, working at KXOL and KFJZ. He left radio to establish his own advertising agency to service a growing Tandy Corporation (headquartered in Fort Worth). Allen built his agency on work done for Tandy's Radio Shack brand. Later, he became a staple in the automotive business, representing McDavid Automotive Group. Featured in the auto dealer's TV commercials, Allen's own Great Dane, Widetrack, became a star of the campaign.

On March 16, 2016, the Federal Communications Commission granted the construction of an FM translator station, K233CV to Bob Mark Allen Productions, Inc. to simulcast the programming of KJIM 1500 as part of the AM Revitalization Act. The low-power FM signal (now K267CB) at 101.3 began broadcasting full-time, day and night, 7 days a week, on March 27, 2017. The low-power transmitter antenna sits on a tower located in Sherman near Texoma Parkway and Hwy 691. The station continues to broadcast a primary and syndicated adult standards format focusing on and featuring music from the 1950s to current songs that fit within the adult format, with a secondary focus on classic hits and soft adult contemporary. Both KJIM and K267CB feature news on the hour from CBS Radio and extended local newscasts each morning. Both KJIM and K267CB also broadcasts a half-cycle on NOAA Weather Radio’s WXK22 which serves the Sherman-Denison area every hour and was also used on weather alerts including the Emergency Alert System with a bit of NOAA Weather Radio broadcast.
