= Craig Miller (broadcaster) =

American radio host (born 1965)

Craig "Junior" Miller
- Born: Craig Miller; December 20, 1965 (age 60); Amarillo, Texas
- Spouse: Natalie Solis
- Presenting career
- Show: Dunham and Miller Show
- Stations: KTCK 1310 AM Previous Stations KRLD (AM) and KNTU
- Time slot: 6:00-9:00 AM
- Style: Sports talk, humor
- Country: United States
- Website: www.theticket.com/Shows/TheMusers/tabid/418/Default.aspx

Craig "Junior" Miller (né Craig Andrew Miller; born 20 December 1965 Amarillo, Texas) is an American radio personality and member of the Dunham and Miller Show, heard 6:00–9:00 am on sports radio KTCK 1310 AM in Dallas, Texas. Miller co-hosts the show with long-time friend and college roommate George Dunham, alongside Gordon Keith.

== Biography ==
Miller is one of the few remaining original Ticket hosts. Miller has been co-hosting with Dunham on the station since 1994. Miller has been nominated for and received several NAB Marconi Radio Awards throughout his career.

In 2023, Miller, Dunham, and Keith were inducted into the Texas Radio Hall of Fame.

In 2025, Miller, Dunham, and Keith launched a podcast, called "The Musers, The Podcast," on the Cumulus Podcast Network.

Miller and his cohosts have the highest rated morning radio program in the Dallas-Fort Worth market.
