= BaD Radio Show =

BaD Radio
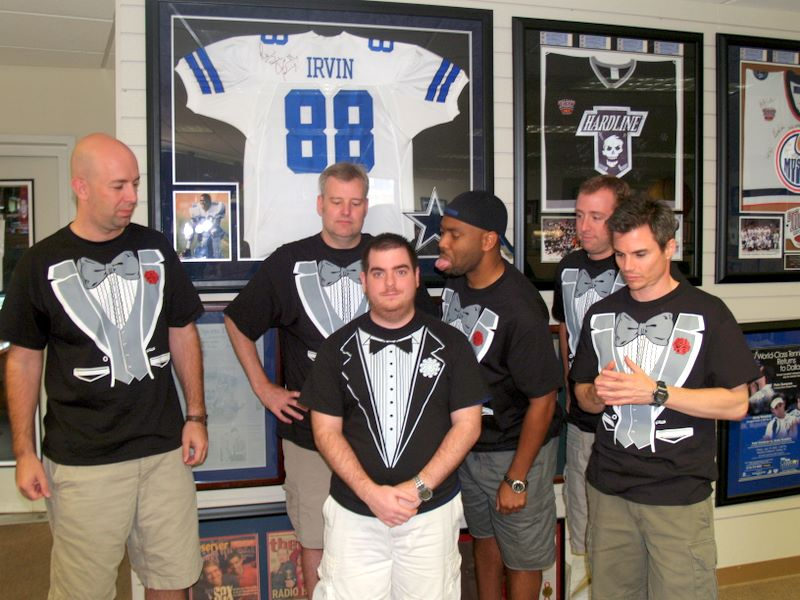
- Genre: Sports/Talk
- Running time: 3 hours
- Country of origin: USA
- Language: English
- Home station: KTCK (AM)
- Starring: Bob Sturm; Dan McDowell; Jake Kemp Producer; David Mino Board Operator; Julie Dobbs Ticker Girl
- Produced by: Jake Kemp
- Recording studio: Dallas, TX
- Website: Bob and Dan's site

The BaD Radio Show (short for Bob and Dan) was a midday radio program on Dallas, Texas radio station KTCK "1310AM, 96.7FM, The Ticket". The show was hosted by Bob Sturm and Dan McDowell, and aired Monday through Friday from 12pm to 3pm.

== Cast members ==
=== Bob Sturm ===
Originally from Wisconsin, Bob Sturm graduated from Liberty University and started his broadcasting career in Lynchburg, Virginia. He eventually came to Dallas in 1998, where he became the host of The Ticket's night time show. He is affectionately referred to as "The Sturminator". Bob is often called a "sports bully" on the show because he constantly intimidates his audience and guests with his encyclopedic sports knowledge, declaring that he's not "just some dude in the next cubicle over." Bob also hosts the Dallas Cowboys pre-game show. Bob claims to have tipped cows as a youth, although the act of cow tipping is considered urban legend. Bob also claims to love the TV show Abby and Britney on TLC.

=== Dan McDowell ===
Dan McDowell, a native of Cleveland, Ohio, is Bob's counterpart. Dan graduated with a degree in communications and a minor in Sports Science from Ohio University. McDowell hosted a midday show in Youngstown, Ohio and eventually moved to Dallas, in 1999, to become the host of The Ticket's midday show. It is well documented in P1 (Ticket fans) lore that Dan brings the funny, while Bob brings the lunch pail.

=== Jake Kemp ===
Jake Kemp is the show's producer. He also hosts the podcast "It's Just Banter," with fellow KTCK employee, TC Fleming, as well as "The Shake Joint" with Sean "Sea Bass" Bass. Kemp is perhaps most well known for his hatred of space and space-related topics and his love for teacher-student sex scandals. He is also the inventor of the bit "Older than Chris Berman". He once received a tattoo while talking on-air that read "R.I.P. Lil Peep". He is a proud alumnus of Richland High School (North Richland Hills, Texas).

Actively hates Alexander Radulov and thinks the Dallas Stars should bench him.

=== David Mino ===
David Mino is the board operator for BaD Radio and the Hardline. He has been with the show since 2014, when then board operator, Jake Kemp, became producer.

=== Julie Dobbs ===
Julie Dobbs provides "Ticket Tickers" between commercials, and often interacts with the rest of the hosts during several segments. She is a recent cancer survivor and started her 10am-3pm ticker duties in July 2018.

== Former cast members ==
=== Donovan Lewis ===
Donovan was the show's "Yuck Monkey", in Ticket lexicon, and delivered the show's opening. He transferred to The Ticket in 2006 after working for sister station KDBN "93.3 The Bone", where he was known as "The Bone Brotha". He is known to his audience on The Ticket as "The Great Donovan," or "Donnie-Doo". A member of Alpha Phi Alpha while a student at East Texas State University (now Texas A&M-Commerce), Donnie had several regular segments, including Daily Donovan (where he visited a variety of sports-related topics), Ask a Black Guy, and the wildly popular Ghetto Jeopardy. Donovan is also a cousin of Marvin Young a.k.a. Young MC and contributed to his 1989 hit "Bust a Move" as well as other songs

Donovan became co-host of the 10 a.m. to 12 p.m. show with Norm Hitzges in 2015.

=== Tom Gribble ===
Tom was the show's former producer. He graduated from Texas A&M University and started his radio career as an intern for Kidd Kraddick on flagship station KHKS "KISS FM". While there, he earned the nickname "Flakeboy", which originated from a stunt during which he went to a supermarket and asked for a single flake of cereal. He then served in Iraq. Afterwards, he returned to Dallas and became the producer of BaD radio. He could often be seen going about town screaming phrases such as, "This is amazing!", "Merry Christmas Philadelphia!", "Merry Christmas Eagles!", and "3 and 0 in the month of December against the NFC East, on the road!". He is also known as "Scoops Callahan: The 1920s Reporter Guy".

=== Michael Gruber ===
"Grubes" attended the University of Phoenix and majored in women's studies. But he's most well known for his friendship with Dallas Mavericks forward Dirk Nowitzki based on Dirk's purchase of Gruber's parent's home in Dallas. He announced that he was leaving The Ticket to attend the University of North Texas.

== Bits ==
=== Homer Call of the Week ===
Homer Call of the Week, one of the "most popular segments of the show", is a collection of audio highlights in which sports announcers express overzealous zeal for the team they are paid to cover. On a weekly basis, clips are voted on by the hosts and crew and ranked based on absurdity.

=== Gay or Not Gay ===
Bob and Dan ask the hypothetical question, “is this gay, or not gay?”, based on descriptions of situations submitted by listeners. The bit is a tribute to broadcasters Opie and Anthony, who originated it. Due to political correctness, the bit name has changed to Gonk or Ragonk.

=== Ask Sports Sturm ===
Bob reviews questions, submitted by listeners, which cover unusual or challenging sports topics.

=== What's on my Tivo ===
Bob and Dan discuss TV shows of the day based on the contents of their DVRs.

=== Guest Booking League (GBL) ===
During the summer sports lull, after hockey and basketball end, a draft of potential future guests is conducted. In order to level the playing field, Hollywood A-listers are placed in a category separate to that of the more bookable personalities. This is commonly a venue the show utilizes to recall memorable film and TV characters (ex. The Oh Face Guy from Office Space and Jon Gries from Napoleon Dynamite) and to learn what the actors who portrayed them are doing now. Rather than crowning a league champion, the show institutes a punishment for the two lowest point totals. Past punishments have included going to a Dallas Stars game in full medieval knight's costume and skydiving.

=== 1920s Reporter Guy – Scoops Callahan ===
Tom Gribble takes on a persona of a cub reporter from the 1920s, complete with 1920s lingo. This character is commonly referred to as Scoops Callahan. The character asks legitimate questions in an unconventional way, typically at the end of a sports press conference.

=== Irv and Joe Game ===
On road trips, BaD Radio competes to see who can pirate the most airtime off of a local radio station by posing as a caller. Extra seconds are awarded for changing topics, working in ticket host names and dropping in a "baby arm".
