= Corby Davidson =

American radio personality (born 1969)

- Born: Corbett Davidson; September 15, 1969 (age 57); Arlington, Texas
- Education: Texas Christian University Lamar High School
- Spouse: Julie Davidson (2000–present)
- Presenting career
- Show: The Hardline
- Station: KTCK 1310 AM
- Time slot: 3:00-7:00 PM
- Style: Sports Talk, Humor
- Country: United States
- Previous show: BaD Radio
- Website: web.archive.org/web/20090209055128/http://theticket.com/Shows/TheMusers/tabid/418/Default.aspx

Corby Davidson, (born Corbett Davidson on September 15, 1969) is an American radio personality.

Also known as "The Snake", "The Cobra", and "Friendly Cobra", Davidson co-hosts The Hardline with Bob Sturm & Dave Lane on sports radio station KTCK (AM) 1310 The Ticket in Dallas, Texas. The Hardline radio show has won several Dallas Observer Awards for Best Sports Talk Show. Davidson was born in Arlington, Texas, graduated from Lamar High School in Arlington, went to TCU but didn't graduate. In 2000, Davidson married Julie Davidson, and together they have two children, Ike and Van.
