= KSEY (AM) =

- Seymour, Texas; United States
- Broadcast area: Wichita Falls, Texas
- Frequency: 1230 kHz
- Branding: ESPN 1230

Programming
- Format: Defunct (was Sports)
- Affiliations: ESPN Radio

Ownership
- Owner: Mark V. Aulabaugh
- Sister stations: KSEY-FM

History
- First air date: 1951
- Last air date: 2023
- Call sign meaning: SEYmour

Technical information
- Licensing authority: FCC
- Facility ID: 71536
- Class: C
- Power: 1,000 watts (unlimited)
- Transmitter coordinates: 33°35′49″N 99°16′42″W
- Translator: 105.7 K289CP (Seymour))

Links
- Public license information: Public file; LMS

KSEY (1230 AM, "ESPN 1230") was a radio station licensed to serve Seymour, Texas, United States. The station's broadcast license was held by Mark V. Aulabaugh.

KSEY broadcast a sports talk format to the greater Wichita Falls, Texas, area. The station was the flagship station for the syndicated The Show with John Clay and Greggo hosted by John Clay Wolfe and Greg "Greggo" Williams. That show ended in February 2010 when Williams and Wolfe were unable to come to financial terms.

Established in 1951, the station was assigned the call sign KSEY by the Federal Communications Commission.

Following the death of the station owner in 2023, KSEY's license was canceled as a matter of law due to being silent over a year on March 18, 2024, at 12:01 a.m.

The Federal Communications Commission cancelled the station’s license on March 28, 2024.
