= Purple Rain (cocktail) =

Name for two different mixed drinks

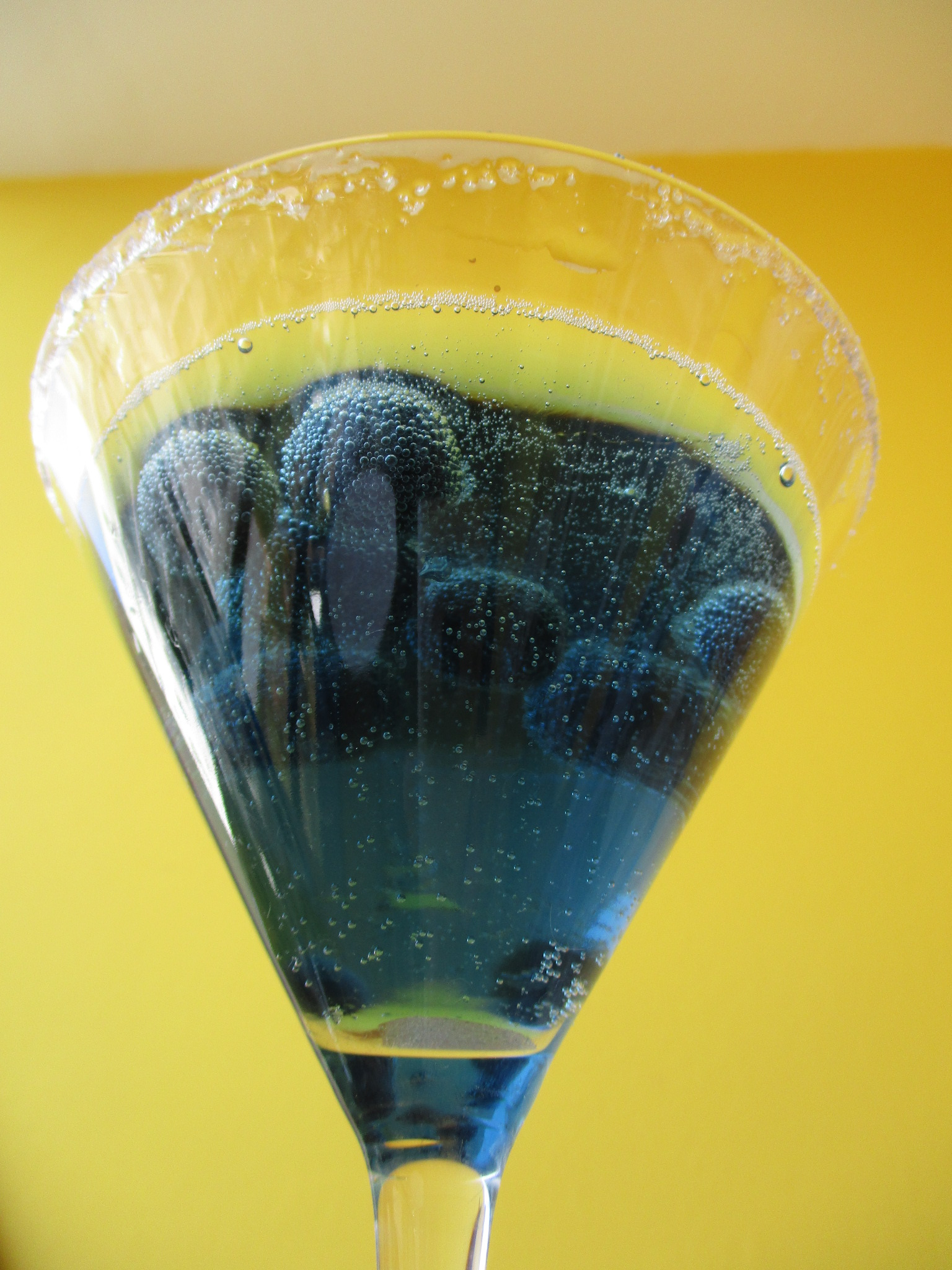
Purple Rain

A Purple Rain is any of at least two popular mixed drinks.

The more common version is a variation on the highball Long Island Iced Tea, substituting either ginger ale, ginger beer or a lemon-lime soda for the sour mix, and Chambord for the cola "float". This variant is purported to have been originally concocted by Prince at his famous bar / dance club / entertainment venue at the corner of North First Avenue and North Seventh Street in his home city of Minneapolis.

The other is a long cocktail made from vodka, lemonade, blue Curaçao and grenadine. The name of this version originates from the appearance of the drink as the grenadine is added as the final ingredient, since the sinking of the red grenadine through the blue of the other ingredients creates the impression of purple rain.

Like many cocktails, this drink has many other variations that have been created, depending on where it is made and who it is made by.

== Grape juice variants ==
One variant uses vodka, orange liqueur, blue curacao, lime juice, pineapple juice, and concord grape juice. Another uses Greenbar Tru Lemon Vodka, Licor, lemon juice, and grape juice.
