= KSEY-FM =

- Seymour, Texas; United States
- Frequency: 94.3 MHz

Ownership
- Owner: Mark V. Aulabaugh
- Sister stations: KSEY (AM)

History
- First air date: June 26, 1981
- Last air date: c. 2023
- Call sign meaning: Seymour

Technical information
- Facility ID: 71535
- Class: A
- ERP: 3,000 watts
- HAAT: 34 meters (112 ft)

KSEY-FM (94.3 FM) was a radio station licensed to Seymour, Texas. The station broadcast a country music format and was owned by Mark V. Aulabaugh.

Following the death of the station owner in 2023, KSEY-FM's license was canceled as a matter of law due to being silent over a year on March 18, 2024, at 12:01 a.m.
