= George Dunham =

American radio personality (born 1965)

- Born: George William Dunham; June 28, 1965 (age 61); San Antonio, Texas
- Presenting career
- Show: Dunham and Miller Show
- Station: KTCK 1310 AM
- Time slot: 5:30-10:00 AM
- Country: United States
- Website: www.theticket.com/the-musers/

George William Dunham (born June 28, 1965); is an American radio personality and member of the Musers in Dallas, Texas. Dunham co-hosts the show with long-time friend and college roommate Craig Miller, along with their co-host Gordon Keith. A 1988 graduate of the University of North Texas, Dunham served as the football play-by-play commentator for the school's Mean Green Radio Network from 1994 until 2014. His first on-air experience was at KNTU, the University of North Texas campus radio station. His son was offered and accepted a football scholarship to attend UNT beginning in fall of 2010. Dunham talks about his past and playing football in junior high against hated rival Fredericksburg when he played special teams at Llano Junior High. Dunham's junior high football coach commonly referred to a player at Fredericksburg, called Pie Eater. Anthony Lynn, LA Chargers head coach and former Texas Tech running back during a radio interview on Thursday, June 20, 2019, asked Dunham about Pie Eater the former punter at Fredericksburg Junior High. Dunham is a 1983 graduate of Carrollton R. L. Turner High School.

Dunham started his professional broadcasting career at KRLD working as a sports reporter for Brad Sham and Chuck Cooperstein.

Dunham and his fellow "musers" were named the National Major Market Personalities of the Year for 2021 by the NAB Marconi Radio Awards. In 2023 they were named to the Texas Radio Hall of Fame.

Co-hosts and callers frequently refer to Dunham by the numerous nicknames that he has acquired over the course of his broadcasting career. These including "Georgio," "Jub-Jub," "Jub," "The Jubinator," "The General," "Jah," "The Big Man," "BC Georgie", “Moose”, and "International Chirp Chirp."

== Other appearances ==
From 1999 to 2009, Dunham served as the public address announcer for the Dallas Cowboys at Texas Stadium. When the team moved to AT&T Stadium and changed flagship stations in 2009, he was replaced by local DFW DJ Jody Dean. This is referred to often on the Ticket, as several characters during skits will jokingly refer to Dunham as "Jody".

Dunham did color commentary and play by play for University of North Texas football and basketball games from 1990 to 2014.

He also provided play-by-play commentary for the Arena League's Dallas Desperados.

== Emergency Brake of the Week ==
Dunham is the host of the show's weekly "Emergency Brake of the Week" segment. The segment highlights moments during the past week of programming on the station in which a host or guest made a confusing, odd, or inappropriate comment that disrupted the broadcast. The moments are then voted on by listeners via phone.
