= Sonochrome =

Brand of kodak film stock

Sonochrome was a brand of Kodak film stock that was pre-tinted, but did not interfere with the optical soundtrack on the film. It was introduced in 1928 and was discontinued in the 1970s. Sonochrome stocks did not see much use in features after the 1930s, but were widely used in theater snipes (short advertisements) and special scenes in films.

== Colors available ==
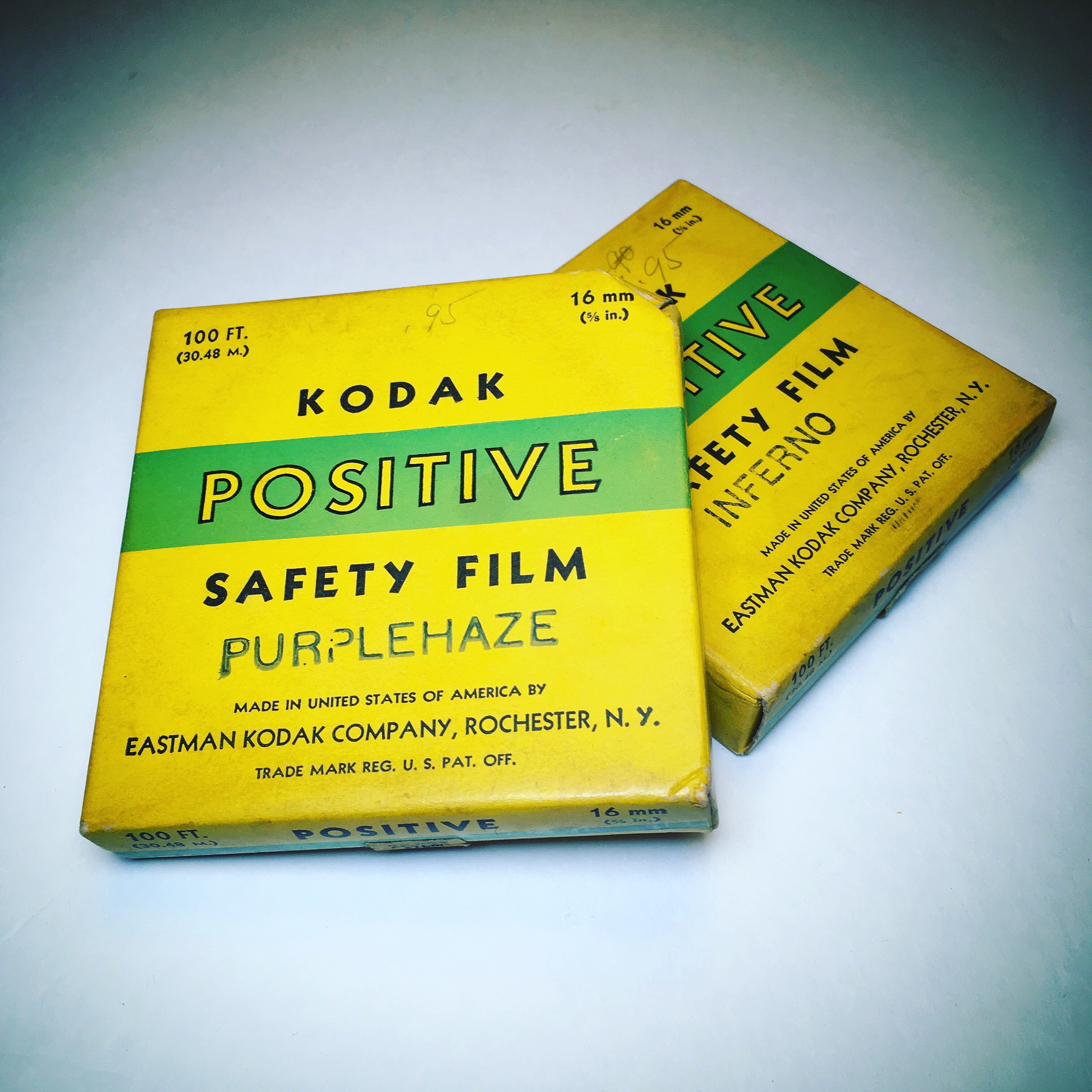
Kodak Sonochrome 16mm Film (1930s)

There were 17 colors in the Sonochrome spectrum:

- Rose Doree
- Peachblow
- Afterglow
- Firelight
- Candleflame
- Sunshine
- Verdante
- Aquagreen
- Turquoise
- Azure
- Nocturne
- Purplehaze
- Fleur de lis
- Amaranth
- Caprice
- Inferno

== See also ==
- Film tinting
- Film colorization
