= Chuck Cooperstein =

American sports radio personality

Chuck Cooperstein is an American sports radio personality based in Dallas, Texas.

== Biography ==
Cooperstein is the radio voice of the Dallas Mavericks, and has been since 2005. He has also worked for Westwood One on its college football and basketball broadcasts in various periods since 1995 (Football) and 1991 (Basketball). Also since 1985, he has served as a play-by-play voice of TCU and University of Texas football, and TCU, SMU and Texas A&M basketball. Chuck has also called NFL games for Westwood One. He worked for KRLD Radio in Dallas between 1984 and 1992; WIP Radio in Philadelphia from 1992 to 1993; KTCK Radio in Dallas from 1994 to 1997; WBAP Radio in Dallas from 1997 to 2001; KESN/ESPN from 2001 to 2016; Cumulus Media/ESPN from 2017 to 2020; ESPN Radio from 2020 to 2021; and iHeart Radio from 2021–present.

== Personal life ==
He is a resident of Irving, Texas with his wife Karen. He has one son; Jeffrey (born 2/27/96). He attended high school at Friends Academy in Locust Valley, NY, and college at the University of Florida

== See also ==
- KTCK (AM)
