= Randy Galloway =

American journalist

- Born: January 19, 1943 (age 83); Mayfield, Kentucky, U.S.
- Occupations: Radio show host, Journalist
- Known for: Galloway and Company

George Randolph Galloway (born January 19, 1943) is an American sports columnist for the Fort Worth Star-Telegram and a graduate of Sam Houston State University. Until September 2013, he was the host of Galloway and Company, the drive-time program on KESN 103.3 FM, ESPN Radio's Dallas affiliate and also heard on ESPN Xtra on XM Radio.

== Career ==
Previously, Galloway has been a columnist for The Dallas Morning News and a radio host for News/Talk 820 WBAP. In 1998, he left The Dallas Morning News after 31 years, accepting a 5-year, $1.5 million contract with the Fort Worth Star-Telegram.

Listeners have become accustomed to Galloway's trademark wit and sarcasm as well as his Texas drawl.

On Friday, December 15, 2006, Galloway paid former Dallas Cowboys' quarterback Quincy Carter's $500 bail after Carter was arrested on marijuana charges.

Galloway broadcast his 5,000th show April 11, 2008, celebrated by KESN in a day-long promotion. President George W. Bush called in as a special guest and congratulated Randy, including an invite to the Oval Office.

In March 2009 Galloway admitted in one of his articles that Buck Showalter told him off the record in 2003 he believed Alex Rodriguez may have been on steroids. Galloway admitted the media should have done more to uncover the baseball steroid scandal.

== Personal life ==
Galloway lives in Aledo, Texas, with his wife Janeen. They have two daughters together.

He enjoys Lone Star Park and used to own horses.
