= Jen Royle =

American sports journalist and chef (born 1974)

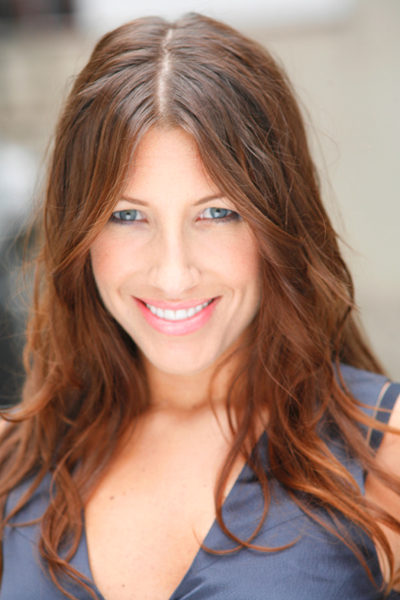
- Born: Jennifer L. Royle; September 3, 1974 (age 52); Mansfield, Massachusetts, U.S.
- Education: Salve Regina University; Cambridge School of Culinary Arts
- Occupation: Chef

Jennifer L. Royle (born September 3, 1974) is an American former sports reporter and writer who is known for working for the YES Network as a New York–based reporter for the MLB New York Yankees baseball team from 2003 to 2006. She is also known as a chef and contestant on ABC's The Taste and Food Network's Beat Bobby Flay.

== Early life and education ==
Royle, born in Mansfield, Massachusetts, was born to Francis K. "Frank" Royle (1945–2006) and Dianne (Borriello) Royle. She attended Mansfield High School in Mansfield, Massachusetts and graduated in 1992. Later that year, she attended Salve Regina University and graduated in 1996 with a bachelor's degree.

== Sports reporter career ==
In 2003, Royle's career began when she was hired as a clubhouse reporter by the YES Network, for whom she would be a regular broadcaster to the New York Yankees before departing in 2006. Her very first interview was at a locker room at the old Yankee Stadium, where she would ask players questions after the game between the New York Yankees and the Boston Red Sox.

After three years working at YES, Royle worked for the MLB Advanced Media, providing coverage from the New York Yankees clubhouse – regular season and postseason games. Conducted exclusive one-on-one on-camera interviews with various Yankees & MLB players, managers and coaches. In May 2008, she joined XM Satellite Radio where she would be reporting two New York City baseball teams such as the New York Yankees and the New York Mets before leaving in 2009. A year later, Royle joined MASN, a Baltimore and Washington D.C.–based regional sports network which airs Baltimore Orioles and Washington Nationals games. She then moved on to WJZ-FM in Baltimore, where she became a beat reporter/radio co-host for Orioles and Baltimore Ravens coverage.

A year prior, Royle worked for the SB Nation as an MLB Columnist for five months before leaving in 2012. A year later, she would join WEEI-FM, a radio station based in Lawrence, Massachusetts, where she served as radio talk show host. A further year later, Royle joined the Boston Herald, serving as a news reporter covering the Boston Celtics, Boston Red Sox, Boston Bruins and the New England Patriots.

== Culinary career ==
Royle appeared in season three of the ABC cooking show The Taste, after which she made the decision to focus exclusively on cooking. She worked at Mario Batali's Babbo in the Seaport, then launched a private cooking company.

In January 2019, she launched a new career as a chef with the opening of a restaurant in Boston. In 2020 she opened TABLE Mercato, an Italian market next door to TABLE restaurant. In 2021, she opened her third location, a Gelateria called TABLE Caffe. Royle is outspoken on social media and regularly engages in online altercations with customers who have issues with the restaurant or leave negative reviews. In February 2024, she attracted attention when she aggressively messaged a customer on his Instagram regarding a cancellation, leading to Royle and TABLE shutting down their social media accounts.

== Personal life ==
She has two brothers. Royle's father died in 2006 due to complications of lung cancer.
