= KZEW =

- Wheatland, Wyoming; United States
- Frequency: 101.7 MHz
- Branding: The Zoo

Programming
- Format: Adult contemporary

Ownership
- Owner: Smith Broadcasting, Inc.

History
- First air date: November 15, 1984
- Former call signs: KYCN-FM (1984–1998)
- Call sign meaning: Sounds like "Zoo"

Technical information
- Licensing authority: FCC
- Facility ID: 60645
- Class: A
- ERP: 3,000 watts
- HAAT: 38 meters (125 ft)
- Transmitter coordinates: 42°2′44″N 104°56′47″W

Links
- Public license information: Public file; LMS

KZEW (101.7 FM, "The Zoo") is a radio station broadcasting an adult contemporary music format licensed to Wheatland, Wyoming, United States. The station is currently owned by Smith Broadcasting, Incorporated, a locally owned media company based in Wheatland. Under owner Kent Smith, the station has been recognized by the Wyoming Association of Broadcasters and won the Small Market Station of the Year award for its coverage of local emergency alerts.

== History ==
TKZEW began broadcasting as KYCN-FM on November 15, 1984. The call sign was changed to the current KZEW on September 4, 1998. Ownership of the station has been held by Smith Broadcasting, Inc. since its acquisition in the 1990s. Prior to 1998, the KZEW call sign was used by what was then an album-oriented rock station in Dallas, Texas which from 1973 to 1989 invented the phrase "The Zoo" on September 19, 1973. In 2017, the station was brought back by the former staff of the original radio station. The station identifies on-air as "101.7 The Zoo". It broadcasts an Adult Contemporary format centered on music from the 1980s to the present.
