= KTCK (AM) =

Radio station in Dallas

- Dallas, Texas; United States
- Broadcast area: Dallas–Fort Worth metroplex
- Frequency: 1310 kHz
- Branding: SportsRadio 96.7 & 1310 The Ticket

Programming
- Language: English
- Format: Sports radio
- Affiliations: Fox Sports Radio; Westwood One Sports; Compass Media Networks; Dallas Stars

Ownership
- Owner: Cumulus Media Inc.; (Cumulus Licensing Holding Company LLC)
- Sister stations: KLIF, KPLX, KSCS, KTCK-FM, WBAP, WBAP-FM

History
- First air date: March 1, 1922
- Former call signs: WRR (1921–1978); KAAM (1978–1994)
- Call sign meaning: "The Ticket"

Technical information
- Licensing authority: FCC
- Facility ID: 8773
- Class: B
- Power: 25,000 watts (day); 5,000 watts (night)
- Transmitter coordinates: 32°56′41.4″N 96°56′26″W
- Repeater: 96.7 KTCK-FM (Flower Mound)

Links
- Public license information: Public file; LMS
- Webcast: Listen live; Listen live (via iHeartRadio); Victory+
- Website: theticket.com

KTCK (1310 kHz; "SportsRadio 1310 The Ticket") is a commercial sports AM radio station licensed to Dallas, Texas, which serves the Dallas–Fort Worth metroplex (DFW). Its daytime power is 25,000 watts, which is reduced to 5,000 watts at night. The station's studios are located in the Victory Park district in Dallas, just north of downtown, and the transmitter site is in Coppell. The station is currently owned by Cumulus Media. KTCK's programs are simulcast on KTCK-FM (96.7 MHz), licensed to Flower Mound, Texas.

KTCK's current callsign and format only date back to 1994. However it is one of the oldest radio stations, including the oldest in Texas, having received its first broadcasting license, as WRR, in March 1922. In addition, prior to its first broadcasting license, WRR was issued an initial transmitting authorization in the summer of 1921, and the station evolved from even earlier work conducted by the Dallas Police Department.

== History ==
=== Station origin ===
The genesis of what would become WRR began through the efforts of local amateur radio enthusiasts belonging to the Dallas Radio Club, in conjunction with Henry "Dad" Garrett, who was Dallas' superintendent of police and fire signals. Inspired by activities at the New York City police department, Frank M. Corlett, a local district manager for the American Radio Relay League, approached the Dallas police about setting up something similar. A short notice in the December 28, 1920, edition of The Dallas Morning News stated that Corlett was developing a system in cooperation with Police Commissioner L. E. McGee which would be used to "notify the near-by police of the escape of prisoners and to give a description of suspects fleeing from Dallas". In early February, it was announced that the plan was now operational, consisting of nightly transmissions between 7 and 10 o'clock. The primary outlet was Corlett's Special Amateur station, 5ZC, located at his home at 1101 East Eighth Street. Two alternate sites were included: Bennett Emerson's Special Amateur station, 5ZG, located at 3720 Wendelkin Street, and John Dorea's amateur station, 5JG, at 117 West Twelfth Street. In early June 1921, it was again announced that the daily police bulletin transmissions had been inaugurated by Corlett and Emerson.

"Dad" Garrett was also involved in the developmental work. Garrett had had an early interest in radio communication. In 1912, a fire broke out that was being dealt with by a majority of the fire department. Meanwhile, a second major blaze occurred, but because the telephone lines were down, there was a delay in alerting crews at the site of the need to deal with the second emergency. Radio was still an unperfected technology, but Garrett recognized its future potential for speeding up communication during emergencies. In May 1921, it was reported that he had installed on a fire truck a radio receiver constructed by Corlett and had successfully received transmissions sent by Emerson and Garrett's son, Charles Garrett.

=== WRR ===
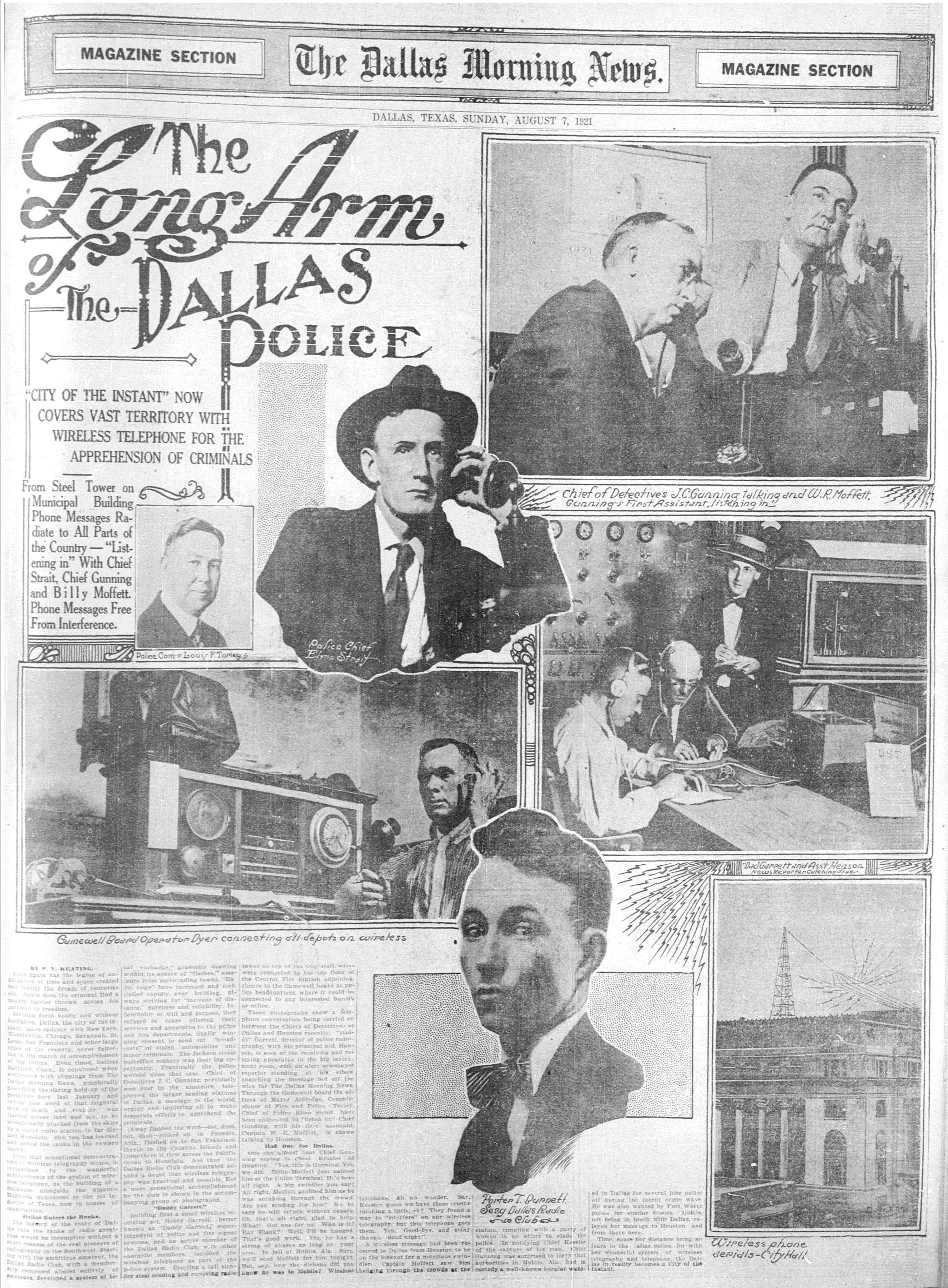
Sunday Magazine article in the August 7, 1921, issue of The Dallas Morning News reviewed the police radiotelephone station that had just been licensed as WRR.

In July 1921, Bennett Emerson sold his transmitting equipment to the city for $250, and it was installed on the second floor of the Central Fire Station at 2012 Main Street, where it came under the oversight of "Dad" Garrett. On August 5, 1921, a Limited Commercial license with the randomly assigned call letters WRR was issued to "City of Dallas (Police and Fire Signal Dept.)", which authorized transmissions on the wavelengths of 400, 450 and 500 meters (750, 667 and 600 kHz), for communication with "Police and Fire Signal portable stations, general communication and broadcasting with amateur stations".

An early review of the new station noted that in addition to broadcasting police reports, it had been used for a two-way conversation between the Chief of Detectives in Dallas and Houston. WRR soon expanded its offerings beyond police and fire reports. In mid-December, it ran a telephone line to the local First Baptist Church's auditorium in order to broadcast Dr. George Truett's Sunday services. By early February 1922 the station's daily schedule included entertainment programs, featuring sports reports and weather forecasts, plus piano, vocal and saxophone solos. "Dad" Garrett's assistant, Lynn B. Henson, took on the majority of the responsibility for running the station.

From 1912 to 1927, the Department of Commerce regulated U.S. radio, and initially, there were no specific restrictions on stations broadcasting entertainment to the general public. The first formal standards were adopted effective December 1, 1921, which specified that broadcasting stations had to hold a Limited Commercial license that also authorized operation on the "entertainment" wavelength of 360 meters (833 kHz) or the "market and weather reports" wavelength of 485 meters (619 kHz). At the time this regulation was adopted a small number of stations already met the new requirements, although this did not include WRR, whose current Limited Commercial license did not have an assignment for either of the broadcasting wavelengths, and as of late January 1922 the station was reported to be broadcasting on 450 meters. In early February 1922, WRR was reported to now be on 360 meters, but it wasn't until March 13, 1922, that the station was issued a new Limited Commercial license that included an authorization to use both broadcasting wavelengths. For this reason the Federal Communications Commission (FCC) records generally list March 13, 1922, as WRR's "Date First Licensed".

In early April 1922, as WRR's focus turned toward general broadcasting, a second transmitter was installed, operating on 200 meters (1500 kHz) under the call sign of 5ZAQ, which took over the broadcasting of fire signals. The common use of 360 meters led to some unique cooperative experiments, including a June 1922 wedding where the three main participants were located at different radio station studios, with the groom broadcasting his responses over WRR, the bride's from WDAO (a short-lived station operated by the Automotive Electric Company), and the minister officiating through the Dallas Morning News' WFAA (now KLIF (AM)).

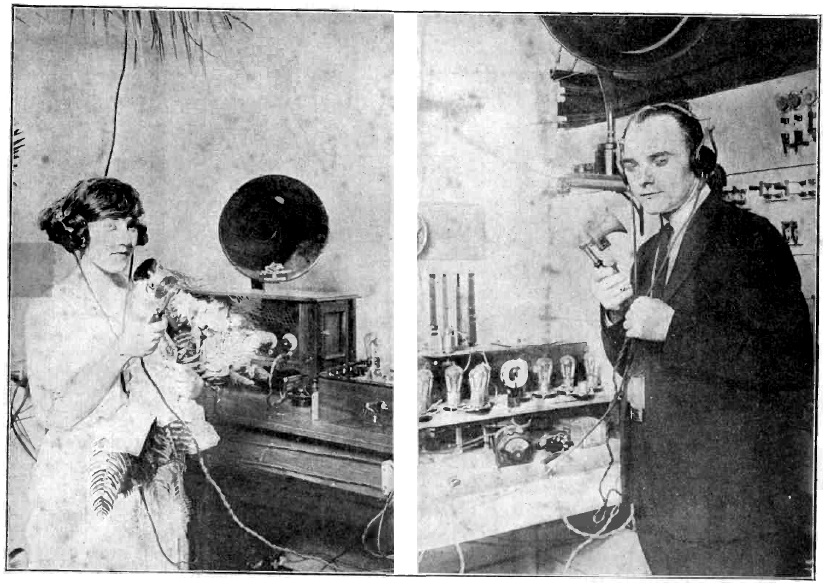
On June 29, 1922, a cooperative radio wedding had the groom at WRR, the bride at WDAO, and the minister at WFAA.

As additional broadcasting stations were established, the joint use of 360 meters led to the need to develop timesharing agreements between the stations to avoid interference. By early July there were five local stations — three in Dallas and two in Fort Worth — and an agreement was concluded which allocated timeslots for the period from 8:45 A.M. to 10:00 P.M. on weekdays, and from 11:00 A.M. to 10:00 P.M. on Sundays. Under this plan, WRR's weekday assignments included "Weather forecast on 485 meters. Lecture and music on 360" from 12:00 noon-12:30, "Baseball, markets, music" from 3:00-3:30, "Police bulletins" from 7:00-7:15, and music from 8:30-9:00. Its Sunday schedule consisted of police bulletins at 7:00 P.M., followed by a church service at 8:00. By the end of 1922, the number of broadcasting stations licensed in the United States had ballooned to over 500. WRR stood out as one of fewer than ten stations operated by a municipality.

In 1925, it was decided that the city could not afford the expense of operating a radio station, and WRR's license was allowed to lapse, leading to its deletion in late July. However, a committee of civic leaders, headed by Edwin J. Kiest, the owner of the Dallas Times Herald, and George B. Dealy, President of the Dallas Morning News, raised the funds needed to revive the station, which was relicensed in October. Beginning in the mid-1920s, WRR started accepting advertising. The station became financially self-supporting and began providing surplus funds to the city government.

Over the years, the number of available transmitting frequencies was expanded. The Department of Commerce and, beginning in 1927, the Federal Radio Commission (FRC) worked to accommodate a growing number of stations, and WRR experienced a series of frequency reassignments. In late 1928, under the provisions of a major reallocation resulting from the FRC's General Order 40, WRR was assigned to full-time operation using 500 watts on a "regional" frequency, 1280 kHz. On March 29, 1941, implementation of the North American Regional Broadcasting Agreement resulted in all the stations on 1280 being shifted to 1310 kHz, which has been the dial position of WRR and its successors ever since.

In 1948, WRR launched an FM station, which was assigned the call letters WRR-FM. Initially WRR provided more popular programming, while the FM station featured classical music. In 1975, WRR became the first station in the Dallas/Fort Worth area to adopt an all-news format when it became affiliated with NBC Radio's new "News and Information Service" network. It continued with this format even after NBC ended the service in 1977. The Dallas government eventually decided to sell WRR while retaining WRR-FM, so after nearly 57 years ownership of the station was transferred to the Bonneville International Corporation in early 1978.

=== KAAM ===
Concurrent with the station sale, the call letters were changed as the station became the first of several incarnations of KAAM when it was owned by the same company that owned KAFM (92.5 MHz). KAAM dropped the all-news format and featured a variety of musical formats.

=== KTCK "The Ticket" ===
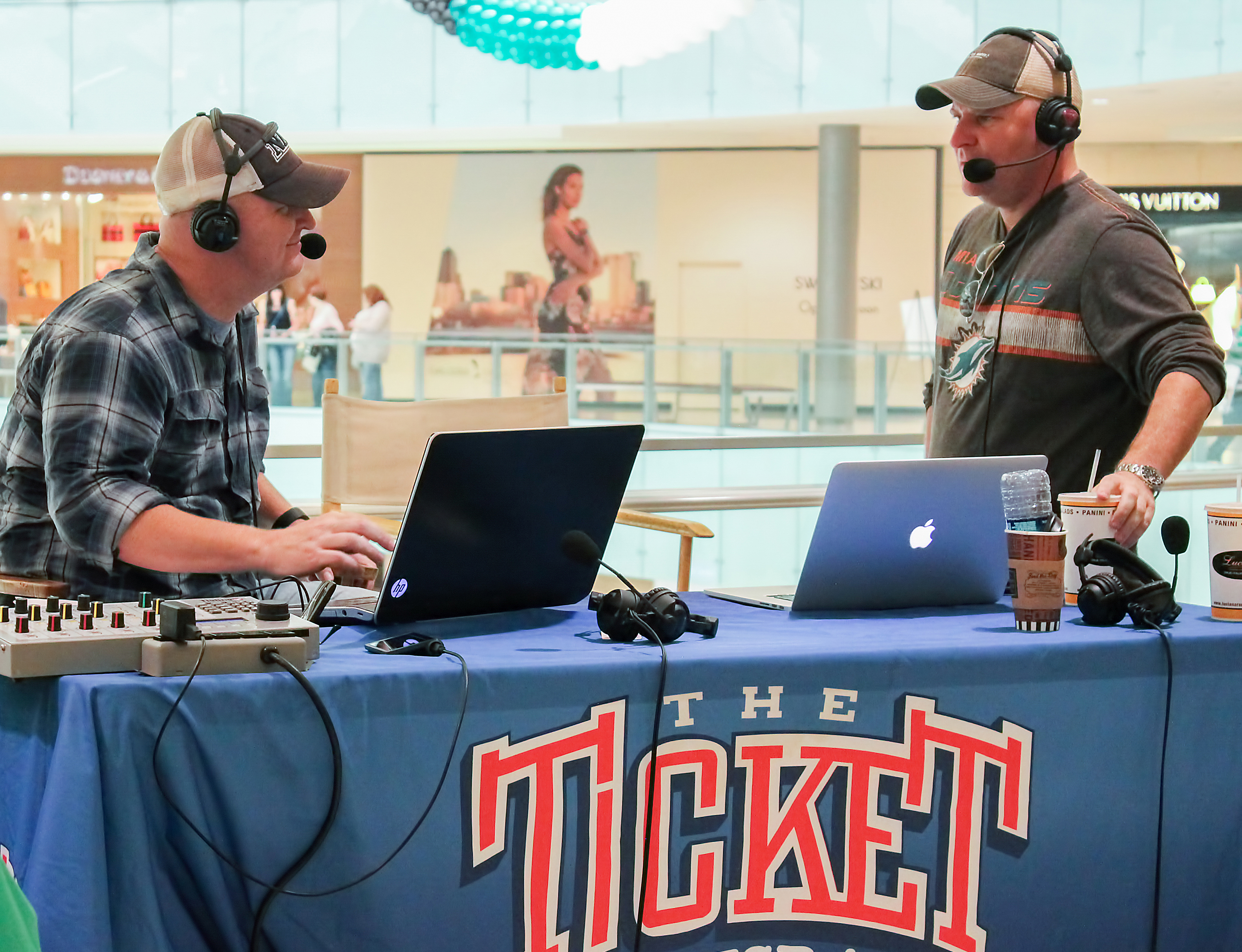
Reporting from a 2014 Dallas Stars fan-event at the Galleria Dallas

In 1994, the station was sold to Cardinal Communications, which changed the call letters to KTCK and adopted a sports talk format as "The Ticket". The Ticket's original lineup consisted of Skip Bayless, Curt Menefee, Mike Rhyner and Greg Williams, Chuck Cooperstein, and George Dunham and Craig Miller. Bayless was the first host to inaugurate the station's sports format, which debuted on the morning of January 24, 1994. The Hardline (now with Bob Sturm, Corby Davidson and Dave Lane) and the Dunham and Miller Show have been part of the station's offerings since the introduction of "The Ticket" format. The sometimes controversial station has posted strong ratings in the Dallas radio market, especially its top-rated shows. Formerly owned by Susquehanna Pfaltzgraff, The Ticket was purchased by Cumulus Media on May 5, 2006.

The Ticket's station logo used 2001-2013 when it simulcast on KTDK 104.1 FM.

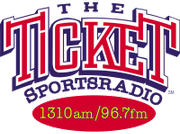
The Ticket's station logo used 2013-2020 before prioritizing its FM frequency over its AM frequency.

On March 6, 2006, the station announced that it would be the flagship affiliate of the National Football League's Dallas Cowboys radio network. This resulted in a 60% ratings increase as reported by the Arbitron rating service. However, on January 23, 2009, KTCK and the Cowboys ended their three-year partnership. On January 16, 2009, The Ticket along with the Dallas Stars issued a press release naming KTCK as the new flagship station for Dallas Stars hockey for five years starting with the 2009-10 season. In 2014, this was renewed for an additional five years.

On August 7, 2013, it was announced that Cumulus Media would take over operation of rival station KESN ("ESPN 103.3"), owned by the Walt Disney Company, through a long-term LMA (local marketing agreement), with programming on both stations remaining the same. As part of this transaction, it was necessary for Cumulus to divest one of its FM stations, due to limits on the number of stations an individual entity can control in a given market. The deal was to take effect once Cumulus completed the transfer of KTDK 104.1 in Sanger, which had been simulcasting KTCK, to Whitley Media. However, the FCC disallowed the Whitley Media transfer, labeling it a straw purchase in which Cumulus would remain the de facto owner of the station, so Cumulus instead surrendered KTDK's license for cancelation. On October 7, 2013, it was announced that The Ticket would begin simulcasting on 96.7 FM, a station which, as WBAP-FM, had been simulcasting WBAP News/Talk 820 AM. The change took effect on October 21, followed by the FM station changing its call sign to KTCK-FM. (WBAP is now rebroadcast on The Ticket's former simulcast spot, KPLX 99.5 HD2).

On September 11, 2024, months after the Dallas Stars announced that their games will be streaming live on Victory+ starting with the 2024-25 season, Cumulus has announced that The Ticket would be streaming their live broadcast on Victory+ as well.

== Awards ==
SportsRadio 1310 The Ticket has won many awards over the years, including the 2007 Marconi Award for "Best Sports Station in America" at the National Association of Broadcasters' annual conference on September 27, 2007. The station and various shows have been Marconi nominees in the past, but this was The Ticket's first win. The Ticket was again recognized as "Sports Station of the Year", winning a second Marconi Award in 2013. The Ticket won its third Marconi Award for "Sports Station of the Year" in 2017. The Ticket was nominated as a finalist for NAB Marconi ‘Station of the Year’ regardless of format in 2018, but did not win.

== In popular culture ==
The FX drama Justified made frequent use of the names of The Ticket personalities for supporting characters as writer/producer VJ Boyd is a former Dallas resident and an active fan of KTCK. Boyd continued this practice in his scripts for NBC's The Player.

== Live sports ==
=== Current ===
- Dallas Stars of the National Hockey League, since the 2009-10 season. Josh Bogorad and Daryl "Razor" Reaugh are the game announcers (simulcast of TV broadcast except for nationally broadcast games) with Michael Dixon and Bruce Levine hosting the pregame, intermission, and postgame shows. Until 2024, Owen Newkirk served as one of the hosts.
- SMU Mustangs football games, since the 2021 NCAA football season. Voice of the Mustangs Rich Phillips along with Scott Garner are the game announcers. Michael Dixon served as halftime and postgame host.
- Westwood One coverage of every primetime NFL regular season and postseason game, except for any involving the Dallas Cowboys due to the league granting KRLD-FM exclusivity as the team’s official broadcaster. If another sporting event (e.g. a Dallas Stars game) airs on The Ticket the same time as a WWO NFL game, this service will air on its sister News/Talk station KLIF 570 AM.

=== Former ===
- Dallas Cowboys of the National Football League (2006–2009). Games now air on competitor Audacy-owned KRLD-FM (105.3).

== Notable on-air staff ==
=== Current ===
- George "Jub-Jub" Dunham
- Craig "Junior" Miller
- Gordon "Gordo" Keith
- Corby "The Snake" Davidson
- Bob "The Sturminator" Sturm

=== Former ===
- Mike Bacsik – former major-league pitcher for several teams, served as producer of The Norm Hitzges Show.
- Skip Bayless – The first on the air personality of KTCK. Host of The Skip Bayless Show. When the ownership decided to accept a lucrative offer to sell the station, the new owners bought out Bayless' contract. He is currently hosting on Fox Sports 1's Undisputed.
- Chuck Cooperstein – Host of The Chuck Cooperstein Show, formerly on KESN. Cooperstein is also the radio play-by-play announcer for the Dallas Mavericks Radio Network.
- Mark Followill – Former Ticket Ticker (news update) announcer for The Hardline and current television play-by-play announcer for the Dallas Mavericks on Fox Sports Southwest and on KTXA 21. Also serves as an occasional "plus one" on The Hardline as well as KTCK's Mavericks post-game show.
- Dale Hansen – Dale Hansen Show, often controversial DFW sports journalist and WFAA-TV sports anchor.
- Norm Hitzges - former host of the "Norm and D Invasion" weekdays from 10-12 until his retirement in 2023.
- Dan McDowell and Jake Kemp - former hosts of The Hang Zone from Noon to 3 until their resignations in 2023.
- Curt Menefee – Curt Menefee Show, current host of Fox NFL Sunday.
- Rocco Pendola – former mid-day host
- Leila Rahimi - former co-host of the Ticket weekend show
- Mike "Old Grey Wolf" Rhyner Hosted The Hardline from 3-7 until 2020. Recently hosted on KEGL (97.1).
- Greg "the Hammer" Williams – former co-host of The Hardline.

== See also ==
- List of initial AM-band station grants in the United States
