= Longhorn Radio Network =

Collegiate sports radio network

- Type: Radio network
- Branding: Longhorn Sports Network
- Country: United States
- Availability: Various AM and FM radio stations
- Headquarters: Austin, Texas
- Broadcast area: Texas; New Mexico (limited)
- Owner: Learfield IMG College; University of Texas at Austin (joint venture)
- Affiliations: KUT, KUTX, Longhorn Network
- Official website: Texas Longhorns website

The Longhorn Radio Network is a radio network in the United States that is dedicated to broadcasting live events and programming of the Texas Longhorns football, basketball (men's and women's), baseball, and softball teams. Owned by Learfield IMG College and the University of Texas at Austin via a joint venture, the network consists of 36 affiliates covering 90% of the state of Texas. The network provides broadcasts in the English language for most affiliates, with some affiliates providing broadcasts in Spanish for the benefit of Hispanic listeners.

== Programming ==
The network produces and broadcasts an annual total of 123 live broadcasts of sporting events, plus 28 weekly editions of the coach's shows starring the football (September–November) and men's basketball coaches (November–March), as well as all postseason events involving the Longhorns.

- Longhorn Weekly - a one-hour sports show featuring the head coaches of the university's major sports programs.

== On-air personalities ==
- Craig Way – play-by-play
- Roger Wallace – color (football)
- Quan Cosby – sideline analyst (football)
- Eddie Oran – analyst (men's basketball)

== Affiliates ==
The main flagships of the network are KTXX in Austin, Texas for the English broadcasts, and KZNX for the Spanish broadcasts of football games.

| Area served | City of license | Callsign | Frequency | Notes |
|---|---|---|---|---|
| Abilene | Abilene | KKHR | FM 106.3 | Men's basketball only |
| Abilene | Abilene | KZQQ | AM 1560 | Football only |
| Alpine | Alpine | KVLF | AM 1240 | Football only |
| Amarillo | | KGNC | AM 710 | Football only |
| Austin, Texas | Austin | K253AM | FM 98.5 | FM translator of KTAE-AM/Elgin |
| Austin, Texas | Austin | KJFK | AM 1490 | Austin Radio Network affiliate |
| Austin, Texas | Austin | KTXX | FM 104.9 | Flagship station for all English-language broadcasts; broadcasts football, men's and women's basketball, baseball, and softball; KTXX is part of the Austin Radio Network |
| Austin, Texas | Austin | KTXX-HD2 | HD 104.9-2 | Flagship station of Spanish-language broadcasts; Spanish-language outlet of the Austin Radio Network |
| Austin, Texas | Creedmoor | KZNX | AM 1530 | Flagship station of Spanish-language broadcasts; Spanish-language outlet of the Austin Radio Network |
| Austin, Texas | Elgin | KTAE | AM 1260 | Football, women's basketball, baseball and softball broadcasts; Austin Radio Network |
| Austin, Texas | Thornton | KOKE | FM 99.3 | Men's basketball only; part of the Austin Radio Network |
| Big Spring | | KBTS | AM 1490 | Football only |
| Bonham/Detroit | Bonham | KFXN (AM) | AM 1420 | Football only |
| Carthage | Carthage | KGAS (AM) | AM 1590 | Football and men's basketball |
| Carthage | Carthage | KGAS-FM | FM 100.7 | Football and men's basketball |
| Corpus Christi, Texas | | KEYS | AM 1440 | Football only |
| Crockett | Crockett | KIVY-FM | FM 92.7 | Football only |
| Dallas/Fort Worth | Dallas | KRLD | AM 1080 | Football only; some schedule overlaps possible KRLD is a 50,000-watt clear channel station, thereby also serving much of Texas, the southwestern U.S. and much of Mexico during night-time broadcasts |
| Dallas/Fort Worth | Highland Village | KWRD-FM | FM 100.7 | Men's basketball; alternate football affiliate |
| Del Rio | | KWMC | AM 1490 | Football only; also serves Ciudad Acuña, Coahuila, Mexico |
| El Paso | El Paso | KROD | AM 600 | Football only; Also serves Las Cruces, New Mexico (United States) and Ciudad Juárez, Chihuahua (Mexico) |
| Fort Stockton | | KFST-AM; KFST-FM | AM 860; FM 94.3 | Football only |
| Henderson/Longview | Henderson | KWRD (AM) | AM 1470 | Football only |
| Houston | Mont Belvieu | KFNC | FM 97.5 | Football and men's basketball |
| Malakoff | Athens | KLVQ | AM 1410 | Football only |
| Marble Falls | | KBEY | FM 103.9 | Football only |
| Marshall | Marshall | KMHT | AM 1450 | Football, men's and women's basketball |
| Marshall | Marshall | KMHT-FM | FM 103.9 | Football only |
| McAllen | Alamo | KJAV | FM 104.9 | Football only; Also serves Brownsville (Texas, United States), Matamoros and Reynosa, Tamaulipas, Mexico |
| Midland/Odessa | Midland/Odessa | KBAT | FM 99.9 | Football only |
| Paris | Bonham | KFYN | AM 1420 | Men's basketball only |
| Paris | Detroit, Texas | KFYN-FM | FM 104.3 | Football and men's basketball |
| San Angelo | | KKSA | AM 1260 | Football and men's basketball |
| San Antonio | San Antonio | WOAI-AM | AM 1200 | Football and men's basketball; all night-time broadcasts available to much of south-central U.S. and much of Mexico due to 50,000 watt clear-channel status |
| San Antonio | San Antonio | KTKR | AM 760 | Longhorn Weekly coach's shows only; alternate basketball affiliate in the event of conflicting schedules between the Longhorns and the NBA's San Antonio Spurs on WOAI |
| Temple | | KTEM | AM 1400 | Football and men's basketball |
| Tyler/Longview | Tyler | KTBB | AM 600 | Football only |
| U.S. Nationwide | N/A | Sirius Satellite Radio | Ch. 117 | |
| U.S. Nationwide | N/A | SiriusXM Internet Radio | Ch. 969 | |
| U.S. Nationwide | N/A | XM Satellite Radio | Ch. 202 | |
| U.S. Nationwide | N/A | Worldwide | TexasSports.com | Also available via the University of Texas at Austin app available on iTunes for Apple devices |
