= Anne Hudson (broadcaster) =

American television personality

Anne Hudson (born in Bowling Green, Kentucky) is a syndicated television personality and radio personality in Austin, Texas. Hudson is currently the lifestyle reporter for Time Warner Cable News Austin & San Antonio. Hudson won the Alliance for Women in Media 'Best TV Personality' award in 2014. Hudson won the Alliance for Women in Media 'Best Radio Personality' award in 2018 and 2019. Hudson is the morning show co-host on 96.7 KISS-FM morning show The Billy The Kidd Show. In addition, Hudson hosts her own mid-day show on the legendary Top 40 Country Radio Station KASE 101 in Austin.

== Past ==
Hudson was the Hill Country Television host on Music and Entertainment Television, the afternoon traffic reporter for Clear Channel Austin Cluster (KVET-FM, KHFI, KASE-FM, KPEZ, KVET, KFMK), and the Mid-Day show host on Gap Broadcasting station KIXS 108 in Victoria, Texas. Hudson has been the official emcee of the annual Music Fest in Steamboat Springs, CO. since 2007 Also voted the #10 Best Radio Personality in Austin 2006 by the Austin Chronicle at The Austin Music Awards. March 1, 2009 ranked 3rd on PopCrunch.com's "The 50 Hottest Women of Radio" list.

== Education ==
Hudson graduated from McCullough High School in 1995. Hudson attended Texas Tech University and graduated in 1999 with a Bachelor of Arts degree in broadcast journalism. Texas Tech University named Hudson the Outstanding Alumna for 2019.
