= KWTR =

KWTR may refer to:

- KWTR (AM), a former weather radio station (1530 AM) in Creedmoor, Texas, United States
- KWTR (FM), a defunct radio station (89.7 FM) formerly licensed to serve Eldorado, Texas, United States
- KORV, a radio station (93.5 FM) licensed to serve Lakeview, Oregon, United States, which held the call sign KWTR from 2011 to 2012
- KWTR (defunct), a defunct radio station (104.1 FM) licensed to serve Big Lake, Texas, which held the call sign KWTR from 1998 to 2011
