= KBIL (Texas) =

Radio station in Texas, United States

San Angelo, Texas; United States
- Frequency: 1420 kHz

Ownership
- Owner: Triangle Texas Media; (Hoss Media, Inc.)

History
- First air date: November 30, 1954
- Last air date: September 9, 1990
- Former call signs: KPEP (1954–1981); KHOS (1981–1983)

Technical information
- Class: D
- Power: 1,000 watts (daytime only)
- Transmitter coordinates: 31°30′08.1″N 100°27′47.8″W

KBIL was a radio station broadcasting on 1420 kHz AM, licensed to San Angelo, Texas, United States. Last owned by Hoss Media, Inc., it operated from 1954 until 1990. Financial difficulties of the owner's parent company led to a foreclosure proceeding; the associated FM station returned under new ownership as KDCD, but the AM did not.

== History ==
David E. Pinkston, trading as the Concho Broadcasting Company, applied to the Federal Communications Commission (FCC) on April 17, 1954, for a construction permit to build a new AM radio station in San Angelo, to broadcast with 1,000 watts during daytime hours only. The permit was granted on August 4 of that year, after changing from 1260 to 1420 kHz to clear a conflict with another proposed station by Walton Foster (which started as KWFR).

KPEP signed on November 30, 1954, with a country music format. Pinkston would remain an owner or part-owner of the station for the next 20 years in different ownership arrangements. C.H. "Joe" Treadway became a part-owner in 1955, exiting the partnership in 1959 and allowing Pinkston to sell 50 percent of KPEP to Leroy Elmore of Lubbock. Elmore sold his shares to Pinkston in 1964, and general manager Bill Nicholson then bought half of the company in 1966. Once again, Pinkston became the sole owner at the start of 1971.

Pinkston sold KPEP in 1975 to Simstone Broadcasting, a venture of San Angelo native Dick Sims and Robert W. Stonestreet of Houston. Simstone retained the country format, with Sims noting that KPEP and KDAV (580 AM) in Lubbock, Texas, which were also started by Pinkston, were among the first country music stations anywhere. Simstone ownership, however, would encounter several bumps in the road. In 1979, he was sued by the American Society of Composers, Authors and Publishers (ASCAP), a performing rights organization, for playing ASCAP-licensed songs without paying its royalties. That year, Sims filed to sell the station to Linda Smith and George Day, who in turn alleged that, by opening an advertising agency in the city, Sims was violating a non-compete clause in the sales contract. Stonestreet objected to the sale, while Sims then sued Smith because she failed to make payments toward the purchase price. The sale went through anyway, though Smith then sold the station in 1981 to KHAG, Inc.

KHAG dropped the KPEP call sign for KHOS in December 1981. Three years later, KHAG sold the station to Hoss Media Inc., a firm that also owned KBIL (92.9 FM) locally and KMHT-AM-FM across the state in Marshall, for $350,000. After the sale closed, the AM station became a simulcast of the successful FM outlet and adopted the KBIL call sign. By 1990, KBIL AM had split off again with an oldies format.

Regional economic troubles at the end of the 1980s would take a serious toll on the Burke radio interests, including KBIL and KMHT. In June 1990, the station laid off three employees citing a "poor business climate". The entire sales staff was dismissed at the end of August, and on September 9, KBIL-AM-FM shut down. A judge appointed a receiver at the request of Connecticut National Bank, which had loaned the KBIL stations $1.3 million in 1988 and was not being paid back with $800,000 still owing; the Internal Revenue Service filed a tax lien for more than $16,000. While this happened, on the night of October 15, an arsonist broke into the control room of the AM transmitter site on Chadbourne Avenue and set it on fire; the building and its contents, which suffered heat and smoke damage, were not insured.

In December 1990, the receiver entered into a deal to sell KBIL-FM to Regency Broadcasting Inc., whose stakeholders were from Amarillo, for $186,000. The FM station returned to operation as KDCD in March 1993. The FCC dismissed a license renewal application for KBIL AM in June 1992, deleting the facility.
