= KVET =

KVET may refer to:

- KVET (AM), a radio station (1300 AM) licensed to Austin, Texas, United States
- KVET-FM, a radio station (98.1 FM) licensed to Austin, Texas, United States
