= KLGO =

KLGO may refer to:

- KTAE (AM), a radio station (1260 AM) licensed to serve Elgin, Texas, United States, which held the call sign KLGO from 2014 to 2017
- KJFK (AM), a radio station (1490 AM) licensed to serve Austin, Texas, which held the call sign KLGO from 2012 to 2014
- KOKE-FM, a radio station (99.3 FM) licensed to serve Thorndale, Texas, which held the call sign KLGO from 2005 to 2012
