= KGAS =

KGAS may refer to:

- KGAS (AM), a radio station (1590 AM) in Carthage, Texas, United States
- KGAS-FM, a radio station (104.3 FM) in Carthage, Texas, United States
