= KFYN =

KFYN may refer to:

- KFYN (AM), a defunct radio station (1420 AM) licensed to serve Bonham, Texas, United States
- KFYN-FM, a radio station (104.3 FM) licensed to serve Detroit, Texas
