= KZEY =

KZEY may refer to:

- KPRO, a defunct radio station (1410 AM) formerly licensed to serve Marshall, Texas, United States, which held the call sign KZEY from 2015 to 2019
- KZEY (690 AM), a defunct radio station (690 AM) formerly licensed to serve Tyler, Texas
- KMHT-FM, a radio station (103.9 FM) licensed to serve Marshall, Texas, which held the call sign KZEY-FM from 1994 to 2003
