= KCLL =

Radio station in San Angelo, Texas

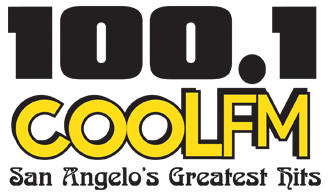
- San Angelo, Texas; United States
- Broadcast area: San Angelo, Texas
- Frequency: 100.1 MHz
- Branding: 100.1 COOL FM

Programming
- Format: Classic hits
- Affiliations: Westwood One

Ownership
- Owner: Foster Communications Co.
- Sister stations: KIXY-FM, KKSA, KWFR

History
- First air date: 1998
- Former call signs: KYZZ (1993–2005)

Technical information
- Licensing authority: FCC
- Facility ID: 17778
- Class: C2
- ERP: 50,000 watts
- HAAT: 117.3 meters (385 ft)
- Transmitter coordinates: 31°31′49″N 100°29′5″W

Links
- Public license information: Public file; LMS
- Webcast: Listen Live
- Website: kcll-fm.com

KCLL (100.1 FM, "100.1 Cool FM") is a radio station broadcasting a classic hits music format. Licensed to San Angelo, Texas, United States, the station is currently owned by Foster Communications Co. and features programming from Westwood One.

== History ==
The Federal Communications Commission issued a construction permit for the station to Dwight Carver on April 13, 1993. The station was assigned the call sign KYZZ on November 19, 1993, and received its license to cover on April 3, 1998. The station had gone on the air in 1995 playing Tejano and country music, moving to a straight Tejano format in 1998. Following the death of Mr. Carver, KYZZ's license was transferred from his estate to Audrey Eileen Carver Luna on January 18, 2002. Audrey Carver upgraded the station to broadcast with 35,000 watts. The station was subsequently sold for $450,000 to its current owner, Foster Communications Co., on May 19, 2004. On May 26, 2005, the station changed its call sign to the current KCLL, ending the Tejano format after a year as had been required in the sale agreement.
