= KWFR =

- San Angelo, Texas; United States
- Broadcast area: San Angelo, Texas
- Frequency: 101.9 MHz
- Branding: 101.9 The Fire

Programming
- Format: Classic rock
- Affiliations: Compass Media Networks; United Stations Radio Networks; Westwood One

Ownership
- Owner: Foster Communications
- Sister stations: KCLL, KIXY-FM, KKSA

History
- First air date: November 6, 1995
- Former call signs: KKLK (1990–1995, CP)
- Call sign meaning: K W FiRe

Technical information
- Licensing authority: FCC
- Facility ID: 22159
- Class: C1
- ERP: 100,000 watts
- HAAT: 104 meters (341 ft)
- Transmitter coordinates: 31°29′29.00″N 100°26′3.00″W

Links
- Public license information: Public file; LMS
- Webcast: Listen Live
- Website: kwfrfm.com

KWFR (101.9 FM) is a radio station broadcasting a classic rock music format. Licensed to San Angelo, Texas, United States, the station serves the San Angelo area. The station is currently owned by Foster Communications.

KWFR is not licensed to broadcast in HD.

== History ==
The station was assigned the call letters KKLK on February 7, 1990. On November 6, 1995, the station changed its call sign to the current KWFR.
