= KDCD =

- San Angelo, Texas; United States
- Frequency: 92.9 MHz
- Branding: Lonestar 92.9

Programming
- Format: Country
- Affiliations: Westwood One

Ownership
- Owner: Four R Broadcasting
- Sister stations: KMDX

History
- First air date: June 1, 1980
- Former call signs: KBIL (1980–1985); KBIL-FM (1985–1993)
- Call sign meaning: To accompany former "CD Country" moniker

Technical information
- Licensing authority: FCC
- Facility ID: 55491
- Class: C1
- ERP: 100,000 watts
- HAAT: 183 meters (600 ft)
- Transmitter coordinates: 31°26′8.5″N 100°34′9.3″W

Links
- Public license information: Public file; LMS
- Webcast: Listen Live
- Website: lonestar929.com

KDCD (92.9 FM, "Lonestar 92.9") is a radio station playing a country music format in San Angelo, Texas, United States. The radio station is owned by Four R Broadcasting, Inc.

== History ==
=== KBIL ===
On August 31, 1977, San Angelo Broadcasters, Inc., a group headed by Bill Jamar of Brownwood, applied to the Federal Communications Commission (FCC) for a construction permit to build a new 100,000-watt FM radio station in San Angelo on 92.9 MHz. The permit was granted on May 29, 1979, and work on studios in the Plaza Tower began early the next year. Airing an adult contemporary format, KBIL began broadcasts in late May and officially started on June 1, 1980.

In 1982, Jamar sold off his stations in Waco and Monahans and began to seek a buyer for KBIL and his two stations in Brownwood. That December, an application was filed with the FCC to sell the stations to a consortium linked to the Ranchlander National Bank, a recently closed financial institution in Melvin. The Baron Radio Corporation, the proposed purchaser, was headed by Roger W. Pipkin III, the bank's former president. However, the defunct Ranchlander was already embroiled in controversy relating to the broadcasting industry. In October, it and its officers were sued in a civil case that alleged that it had defrauded KVEO-TV, a new television station at Brownsville, of tens of thousands of dollars; that November, the bank was declared insolvent by federal officials and closed after 75 years in business. When contacted by the San Angelo Standard-Times, Pipkin, listed as the sole owner of Baron, denied any involvement or even knowledge of the filing, which had been prepared by Lawrence Ludka, also a Ranchlander associate. Jamar then withdrew the application.

Jamar instead sold KBIL in 1983 to Triangle Texas Media of Tyler. The new owners inherited the second-most-listened-to station in town; two years later, however, they sued Jamar and the manufacturer of the transmitter for misrepresentations. It claimed Jamar inflated cash flow figures for the station and thus overvalued it by at least $500,000 and that CSI Electronics had produced a defective transmitter and would not fix it. The civil case went to a jury trial in 1987. In 1984, Triangle Texas acquired a daytime-only AM station, KHOS (1420 AM), and renamed it KBIL. By 1990, KBIL AM had split off again with an oldies format.

=== More than two years of silence ===
Regional economic troubles at the end of the 1980s would take a serious toll on the Burke radio interests, including KBIL and KMHT-AM-FM across the state in Marshall. In June 1990, the station laid off three employees citing a "poor business climate". The entire sales staff was dismissed at the end of August, and on September 9, KBIL-AM-FM shut down. A judge appointed a receiver at the request of Connecticut National Bank, which had loaned the KBIL stations $1.3 million in 1988 and was not being paid back with $800,000 still owing; the Internal Revenue Service filed a tax lien for more than $16,000.

The AM transmitter facility was heavily damaged by arson in October 1990; the building and its contents were not insured, and the station never returned to air.

=== KDCD ===
In December 1990, the receiver entered into a deal to sell KBIL-FM to Regency Broadcasting Inc., whose stakeholders were from Amarillo, for $186,000. The Auldridge family, majority owners of Regency, moved from Amarillo to San Angelo after the purchase.

San Angelo-area listeners would have to wait more than two years for the station's return, but in March 1993, KBIL-FM was reactivated as a country music station under the name KDCD. Regency expanded its presence in San Angelo in 1998 by starting KMDX (106.1 FM) and moved the stations into their present quarters at 3434 Sherwood Way in 1999.

In 2007, Four R Broadcasting, whose other stations were in eastern New Mexico, acquired KDCD and KMDX from Regency for $1.5 million.
