= National Collegiate Baseball Writers Association =

Association of baseball writers

The National Collegiate Baseball Writers Association (NCBWA) is an association of baseball writers, broadcasters, and publicists in the United States. It was founded in 1962.

The NCBWA compiles a preseason ranking of the top 30 teams in the nation, as voted on by its members. In addition, weekly rankings of the top 25 teams are released throughout the season and after the College World Series. Bo Carter serves as executive director of the NCBWA while Mike Montoro is senior associate executive director along with associate executive director Ryan Bomberger, associate executive director Malcolm Gray and assistant executive director Russell Luna.

The NCBWA awards NCBWA preseason All-American awards, the Dick Howser Trophy (Player of the Year), Coach of the Year, regional Players of the Year awards, and All-American awards.

== National Coach of the Year ==
The NCBWA's coach of the year award was re-named in 2020 after Florida State baseball coach Mike Martin.

Coach of the Year
| Season | Coach | Team |
|---|---|---|
| 2008 | Mike Batesole | Fresno State |
| 2009 | Brian O'Connor | Virginia |
| 2010 | Jim Schlossnagle | TCU |
| 2011 | David Esquer | California |
| 2012 | Matt Senk | Stony Brook |
| 2013 | Tracy Smith | Indiana |
| 2014 | Mike Gillespie | UC Irvine |
| 2015 | Paul Mainieri | LSU |
| 2016 | Gary Gilmore | Coastal Carolina |
| 2017 | Pat Casey | Oregon State |
| 2018 | Gary Henderson | Mississippi State |
| 2019 | Erik Bakich | Michigan |
| 2020 | no selection due to COVID-19 pandemic | |
| 2021 | Tony Vitello | Tennessee |
| 2022 | Link Jarrett | Notre Dame |
| 2023 | Ryan Folmar | Oral Roberts |
| 2024 | Nick Mingione | Kentucky |
| 2025 | Dan Skirka | Murray State |

== Wilbur Snypp Award ==
The NCBWA's Russell D. Anderson/Wilbur Snypp Award for contributions to college baseball plaque memorializes longtime Ohio State sports information director and NCBWA founder Wilbur (Bill) Snypp. Snypp was a noted contributor to the writers' organization, which began in 1962, as well as an officer in the group. In 2021, the association added Russell D. Anderson's name to the award, honoring its longtime treasurer and associate executive director. The annual award honors a professional for contributions to college baseball. Voting is conducted by a panel of previous winners, who include past NCAA College World Series directors, College Sports Information Directors of America Hall of Fame members, media members, and others.

Past Russell D. Anderson/Wilbur Snypp Award winners include:

- 1975 – Wilbur Snypp, Ohio State
- 1976 – Bill Esposito, St. John's
- 1977 – Phil Langan, Cornell
- 1978 – John Geis, Southern Conference
- 1979 – Hank Schomber, Georgia Southern
- 1980 – Bob Culp, Western Michigan
- 1981 – Lou Pavlovich Sr., Collegiate Baseball
- 1982 – Tom Price, South Carolina
- 1983 – Bob Bradley, Clemson
- 1984 – Robert Williams, Omaha World-Herald
- 1985 – Jerry Miles, NCAA
- 1986 – Larry Keefe, Seton Hall
- 1987 – Tom Rowen, San Jose Mercury-News
- 1988 – Fred Gerardi, KESY-FM
- 1989 – Jim Wright, NCAA
- 1990 – Steve Weller, SIU-Edwardsville
- 1991 – Bill Little, Texas
- 1992 – Kirk Bohls, Austin American-Statesman
- 1993 – Bo Carter, Southwest Conference
- 1994 – Lou Pavlovich Jr., Collegiate Baseball
- 1995 – Steve Pivovar, Omaha World-Herald
- 1996 – Gary Johnson, NCAA
- 1997 – Dave Wohlhueter, Cornell
- 1998 – Allan Simpson, Baseball America
- 1999 – Alan Cannon, Texas A&M
- 2000 – Jim Callis, Baseball America
- 2001 – Dick Case, USA Baseball
- 2002 – Russ Anderson, Conference USA
- 2003 – John Manuel, Baseball America
- 2004 – Dana Heiss Grodin, USA Today Sports Weekly
- 2005 – Dennis Poppe, NCAA
- 2006 – Mike Montoro, Southern Miss
- 2007 – Barry Allen, Alabama
- 2008 – Mike Patrick, ESPN
- 2009 – Al Chase, Honolulu Star-Bulletin
- 2010 – Lou Spry, NCAA
- 2011 – Jeremy Mills, ESPN/D1Baseball
- 2012 – Eric Olson, Associated Press
- 2013 – J.D. Hamilton, NCAA
- 2014 – John Sullivan, Rice
- 2015 – David Feaster, Dick Howser Trophy
- 2016 – Ralph Zobell, BYU
- 2017 – Aaron Fitt, D1Baseball
- 2018 – Kyle Peterson, D1Baseball and ESPN
- 2019 – Jim Ellis, Mississippi State
- 2020 – Malcolm Gray, East Carolina
- 2021 – Kevin Kugler, Westwood One
- 2022 - John Cox, Southern Miss
- 2023 - Ryan Bomberger, Liberty
- 2024 - Craig Way, Longhorn Radio Network
- 2025 - Howard Borden

== See also ==
- College Baseball All-America Team
- List of college baseball awards
- Baseball awards #U.S. college baseball
- Baseball Writers' Association of America
- National Sports Media Association
- Pro Basketball Writers Association
- United States Basketball Writers Association (college)
- Football Writers Association of America (college)
- Pro Football Writers of America
- Professional Hockey Writers Association
