= KVLR =

Radio station in Texas, United States

- Sunset Valley, Texas; United States
- Broadcast area: Austin-Round Rock metropolitan area
- Frequency: 92.5 MHz (HD Radio)
- Branding: Air-1

Programming
- Format: Worship music
- Subchannels: HD2: Radio Nueva Vida; HD3: Boost Radio (Christian hip hop)
- Affiliations: Air1

Ownership
- Owner: Educational Media Foundation
- Sister stations: KFMK, KLLR, KMLR, KYLR

History
- First air date: 1992
- Former call signs: KKLB (1990–2007); KXXS (2007–2012)
- Call sign meaning: K-Love (previous format)

Technical information
- Licensing authority: FCC
- Facility ID: 19223
- Class: C3
- ERP: 4,900 watts
- HAAT: 161 meters (528 ft)
- Transmitter coordinates: 30°19′23.00″N 97°47′58.00″W
- Translators: HD2: 92.9 K225CA (Del Valle); HD3: 92.1 K221GC (Austin)

Links
- Public license information: Public file; LMS
- Webcast: Listen live
- Website: air1.com nuevavida.com (HD2) myboostnation.com (HD3)

KVLR (92.5 FM) is a non-commercial radio station licensed to Sunset Valley, Texas, United States, and serving the Austin-Round Rock metropolitan area. It is owned by the Educational Media Foundation as the Austin affiliate for EMF's Air1 radio network.

The station also has two translators at 92.1 FM in Austin and 92.9 FM in Del Valle. In the Austin area, Air1 programming is also heard on 92.1 KYLR in Hutto. KVLR broadcasts in HD Radio; its HD2 digital subchannel carries programming from Radio Nueva Vida, a Spanish-language Christian radio network.

== History ==
The station first signed on the air in 1992. The station started as KKLB ("Club 92") with a Spanish-language contemporary hits format. In the early 2000s, KKLB switched to Spanish Oldies as La Lupe 92.5 FM, but kept the KKLB call sign.

On February 23, 2007, the call letters were changed from KKLB to KXXS as part of a format switch to Spanish pop-formatted "Digital 92.5". "La Lupe" moved to KXTZ 1560 AM.

Digital 92.5 lasted until November 2, 2009. The format changed formats to sports radio, simulcasting KTTX 104.9 FM.

On November 30, 2009, KXXS split from the KTTX simulcast and changed formats to oldies, with programming from Scott Shannon's "True Oldies Channel."

On August 15, 2011, KXXS began simulcasting its oldies sound on 98.9 FM, KXBT. On September 3, 2011, the True Oldies format ended on KXXS, switching top KXBT. KXXS switched to Spanish-language sports as an ESPN Deportes Radio affiliate.

On July 2, 2012, the station again changed its call sign, this time to KVLR and changed to EMF's K-LOVE Contemporary Christian format as a result of a sale to Educational Media Foundation. The sale to EMF was consummated on October 17, 2012, at a purchase price of $750,000. KVLR also began broadcasting EMF's Air1 Christian Worship format on its HD2 digital subchannel.

On November 1, 2020, EMF switched the K-Love format to newly acquired KFMK 105.9 FM and moved Air1 programming to the primary channel on 92.5 FM.
