= Anne Hudson =

Anne Hudson may refer to:

- Anne Lester Hudson (1932–2025), American mathematician
- Anne Hudson (literary historian) (1938–2021), British literary historian
- Anne Hudson, 1992 winner of The Liffey Swim
- Anne Hudson (broadcaster), American TV and radio presenter.

== See also ==
- Ann Hudson, character in the American TV series WIOU
- Jo Ann Algermissen (1942–2009), American romantic novelist, who also wrote as Anna Hudson
