= KMHT =

KMHT may refer to:

- Manchester–Boston Regional Airport in Manchester, New Hampshire, United States
- KMHT (AM), a radio station (1450 AM) licensed to Marshall, Texas, United States
- KMHT-FM, a radio station (103.9 FM) licensed to Marshall, Texas, United States
