= KIXY-FM =

Coordinates: 31.487°N 100.450°W

- San Angelo, Texas; United States
- Frequency: 94.7 MHz
- Branding: 94.7 KIXY FM

Programming
- Format: Top 40 (CHR)
- Affiliations: United Stations Radio Networks; Westwood One

Ownership
- Owner: Foster Communications
- Sister stations: KCLL, KKSA, KWFR

History
- First air date: January 13, 1967

Technical information
- Licensing authority: FCC
- Facility ID: 22157
- Class: C1
- ERP: 100,000 watts
- HAAT: 109 meters (358 ft)

Links
- Public license information: Public file; LMS
- Webcast: Listen Live
- Website: www.kixyfm.com

KIXY-FM (94.7 MHz) is a radio station in San Angelo, Texas, United States, broadcasting a contemporary hit radio format. The station is owned by Foster Communications.

== History ==
On April 5, 1966, Solar Broadcasting Company, owned by Walton Foster alongside KWFR (1260 AM), filed with the Federal Communications Commission to build a new FM radio station in San Angelo, an application approved on August 9. KWFR-FM began broadcasting on January 13, 1967, as the third FM station for the city; it operated from noon to midnight as a simulcast of the daytime-only AM station and with its own programming after sunset, serving as an effective continuation of the Top 40 format programmed on KWFR. This made it unusual for the time, as there were very few Top 40 stations on FM in the 1960s.

The call letters were changed to KIXY in 1970 and KIXY-FM in 1973, on the latter occasion when the AM station also adopted the KIXY call sign. Also in 1973, the station began broadcasting in stereo. The KIXY stations were sold in 1978 to CDI/Abaris Communications Associates, a consortium of three Chicago men. However, Foster sued CDI/Abaris in 1981, claiming it violated a covenant of the sale that prevented them from materially reducing the stations' net worth, given that the stations were held as collateral in loans Foster had made to the Chicago firm. In early 1984, a federal jury heard the case, and Foster bought back the stations and reassumed control in April. In 1987, he flipped all of his other stations—KHOS-AM-FM in Sonora, KYXX in Ozona, and their translators—to simulcasting KIXY-FM with local news and public affairs for their areas.

Foster attempted to sell his radio stations again in 1988, this time to Radioactivity, Inc. of Georgia. Radioactivity—which was buying stations in Texas and Georgia—was led by Clyde Murchison, who claimed to be a nephew of Clint Murchison, the former owner of the Dallas Cowboys. Initially snagged by a late equal employment opportunity report filed by the buyer, Radioactivity soon imploded after Clyde Murchison was arrested for wire fraud. He was not recognized by a friend of the real Murchison family, prompting other company officers to request an FBI investigation, and was arrested in a sting operation after having been revealed to have falsified his family connections and financial qualifications. The other officers in Radioactivity expelled Murchison, but Foster sued the firm for breach of contract.

KIXY-FM has generally been at or near the top of San Angelo's radio ratings,"KIXY FM 94.7 San Angelo, TX 29 May 2000". sometimes posting dominant numbers. One 1987 survey by Birch Ratings attributed more than half of all radio listening in San Angelo to KIXY-FM with a 51.6 share.
