= KTAE (AM) =

Radio station in Austin, Texas

- Elgin, Texas; United States
- Broadcast area: Austin metropolitan area
- Frequency: 1260 kHz
- Branding: Romance 105.3 & 101.9

Programming
- Language: Spanish
- Format: Contemporary hit radio

Ownership
- Owner: Norsan Media; (Norsan Media Group, L.P.)
- Sister stations: KTXX-FM; KOKE-FM; KNMF

History
- First air date: April 1, 1948
- Former call signs: KTAE (1948–2002); KWNX (2002–2014); KLGO (2014–2017)

Technical information
- Licensing authority: FCC
- Facility ID: 35647
- Class: D
- Power: 1,000 watts (day); 144 watts (night)
- Transmitter coordinates: 30°36′18.7″N 97°25′2″W
- Translator: 101.9 K270CO (Round Rock)
- Repeater: 104.9 KTXX-HD2 (Bee Cave)

Links
- Public license information: Public file; LMS
- Website: romanceaustin.com

KTAE (1260 AM) is a commercial radio station licensed to Elgin, Texas, United States, and serving the Austin metropolitan area with a Spanish contemporary hit radio format as "Romance 105.3 & 101.9". It is owned by Norsan Media, with studios along Loop 360 in Southwest Austin.

KTAE is powered at 1,000 watts by day and 144 watts at night. The transmitter is on North Main Street in Taylor, Texas. Programming is also heard on 250-watt FM translator K270CO at 101.9 MHz in Round Rock, Texas.

== History ==
Under the KWNX call sign, this station signed on the air on April 1, 1948. It began with a talk radio format. It later became an ESPN Deportes Radio affiliate, and was the first Spanish-language sports radio station in Texas. On September 4, 2011, KWNX became a straight simulcast of its sister station, KTXX-FM, with the exception of broadcasts of Texas Rangers baseball, occasional Round Rock Express baseball, and Baylor Bears and Texas State Bobcats football. On August 19, 2013, it stopped simulcasting KTXX-FM and began broadcasting ESPN Radio programming throughout the day. The lone exception during the weekday was Afternoons with Bucky and Erin, which was also broadcast on KTXX-FM. KWNX continued to broadcast Texas Rangers games, Texas State football games and occasional Round Rock Express and San Antonio Spurs games.

On January 2, 2014, after its sister station, KTXX-FM, became a mix of local sports talk and classic hits, KWNX again became a straight simulcast of KTXX-FM. The exceptions were when KWNX aired Texas Rangers games, San Antonio Spurs games, Texas State football games, occasional Round Rock Express games and various other sporting events.

The call sign changed to KLGO on May 19, 2014.

On June 5, 2014, the simulcast of KTXX-FM ceased and 1300 AM became an urban gospel station. It continued to broadcast sporting events, including Texas Rangers games, San Antonio Spurs games, Texas State football games, occasional Round Rock Express games and various others.

On May 10, 2015, KLGO changed its format to all-comedy, branded as "Comedy 1260". It also continued to broadcast sporting events, including Texas Rangers games, San Antonio Spurs games, Texas State football games, occasional Round Rock Express games and various others.

Previous logo

On August 29, 2015, KLGO returned to a simulcast of KTXX-FM. The exceptions were Texas Rangers games, some Texas Longhorns sports, occasional Round Rock Express games, and a few others.

The station changed its call sign back to the original KTAE on June 15, 2017.

On July 12, 2023, owner Genuine Austin Radio announced that the "Horn" format would be moved exclusively to KTAE and FM translator K270CO (101.9 FM) effective August 1. While the station retained the sports talk format and Rangers games, it lost the Texas Longhorns to a partnership of iHeartMedia's KVET and KVET-FM, a move announced the following day. Norsan Media would later announce that it had bought the 104.9 FM signal, and in April 2024, would announce that it had agreed to buy the rest of Genuine Austin Radio's stations, including KTAE. The station announced a move to exclusive online streaming on May 30, 2024, effective on June 1.

KTAE identified itself as "The Horn," referring to the Texas Longhorns, the sports teams of the University of Texas in Austin. On weekdays, local sports shows were heard in morning and afternoon drive time. Middays and early afternoons featured two nationally syndicated programs: The Jim Rome Show and The Rich Eisen Show. Nights and weekends, KTAE carried programming from the Houston-based SportsMap network.

On June 1, 2024, KTAE changed its format from sports to Spanish-language classic hits, branded as "Magia 101.9". It uses the dial position of its FM translator in its branding. The flip to a Spanish language format is coupled with the station's sale to Norsan Media, which specializes in Latin radio.

On August 3, 2026, KTAE dropped the Spanish classic hits format and changed its format to Spanish contemporary hit radio, branding as "Romance 105.3 & 101.9", simulcasting with KTXX-HD4 and K287FG.
