= KMDX =

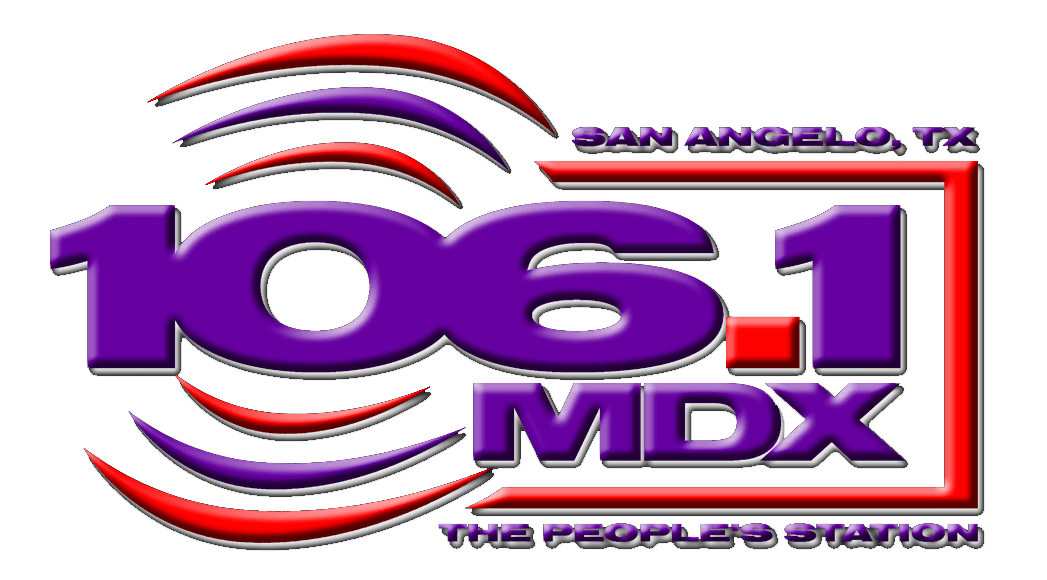
- San Angelo, Texas; United States
- Broadcast area: San Angelo, Texas
- Frequency: 106.1 MHz
- Branding: 1061 MDX

Programming
- Format: Rhythmic contemporary
- Affiliations: Compass Media Networks

Ownership
- Owner: Four R Broadcasting
- Sister stations: KDCD

Technical information
- Licensing authority: FCC
- Facility ID: 84829
- Class: C2
- ERP: 50,000 watts
- HAAT: 139.0 meters (456.0 ft)
- Transmitter coordinates: 31°26′8″N 100°34′8″W

Links
- Public license information: Public file; LMS
- Webcast: Listen Live
- Website: 1061mdx.com

KMDX (106.1 FM) is an American radio station licensed to San Angelo, Texas, United States, the station serves the San Angelo area playing a Rhythmic contemporary format. The station is owned by Four R Broadcasting.

== History ==
On February 15, 2007, the station was sold to Four R Broadcasting. In November 2007, the station dropped the moniker "Mix 106" in favor of the new brand "106-1 MDX." From November 2007 until January 2012 the station used the slogan "San Angelo's Most New Hit Music." In January 2012 the station moved to the new slogan "All of Today's Hottest Hits & Fewest Commercials." Most recent the station tweaked to a rhythmic based product.

== Programming ==
- The Dana Cortez Show (Weekdays)
- C-MO
