= Ranchlander National Bank =

Bank in Texas, United States

The Ranchlander National Bank was a financial institution in the town of Melvin, Texas, United States. It was chartered in 1916 and collapsed in November 1982 after bank fraud was uncovered under its final de facto owner, who was revealed to be one-time convicted bank fraudster Orrin Shaid. Shaid was sentenced to prison for bank and mail fraud charges in connection with the Ranchlander and other Texas banks. The bank was last located at the intersection of US 87 and FM 2028 north of Melvin.

== History ==
=== Pre-1982 history ===
The First State Bank of Melvin was chartered on June 14, 1916, five months after receiving a state banking license in January, and became a national bank in 1925. E. A. Baze purchased controlling stake in the bank in 1920 and became its president eight years later. The bank had more than $246,000 in deposits at the end of 1941; within five years, that total had surged past $1 million. A. Waldrep was president from 1949 until he sold his stake in the bank in 1967.

Doyle Todd, who had become the bank's chairman by 1970, announced plans in 1973 to develop "North Melvin" along US 87 and proposed to build the Ranchlander Center, a facility that would contain the bank and other businesses; he also changed the name of the bank from First National Bank of Melvin to Ranchlander National Bank. In 1974, the new Ranchlander building opened alongside the Lowake Inn steak house and a Mobil gas station. The facility was annexed into town along with a connecting strip of land 0.5 miles (0.80 km) wide. The loss of the bank to the out-of-town development would otherwise have been a major blow, considering that in 1973, it paid half of Melvin's tax value; still, its departure deprived the immediate core of Melvin—which had been declining since the 1930s due to highway reroutings, railroad and school closures, and water supply issues—of one of its most profitable business ventures.

In 1981, Todd sold the Ranchlander. Jean Moon of Dallas, president and chief executive officer, was presented as the public face of the bank; she had moved from Houston, where she worked at a mortgage firm, to nearby Brady, and ran the Ranchlander bank and restaurant. The principal stockholder listed on documentation was Lynn Carruth Maree of Tyler; Todd was removed as a director and "locked out". Carruth Maree was seen around town in a limousine with a man who many thought to be her chauffeur.

As of September 30, 1982, the bank had $4.124 million in deposits.

=== 1982 closure ===
On November 19, 1982, the Comptroller of the Currency declared the Ranchlander National Bank insolvent and closed it down at 10:10 am. Bank examiner David Baer stated that, after a week-long audit, "serious loan losses, coupled with suspected fraudulent activity, exhausted the bank's capital funds", resulting in its insolvency; Moon was reported missing, and investigators were searching for her. The bank's closing was seen as another blow to a town whose population had dwindled from 750 to 300. November 19 was a Friday, and on Monday, November 22, the Federal Deposit Insurance Corporation (FDIC) opened the bank for depositors to be repaid; many then drove to open accounts at the four financial institutions in Brady or in Eden, the other direction on US 87. It was the first bank failure in McCulloch County since 1930. The restaurant, the only such facility in Melvin, closed alongside the bank. Ranchlander was the smallest of 34 commercial banks in the United States to fail in 1982.

Moon's whereabouts were "big news" in town and led to rapidly running rumors and even an article in The Washington Post. An affidavit unsealed on December 9 revealed that while Maree was the principal stockholder in Ranchlander, the real party in interest was another East Texan. Orrin Shaid, Jr., the "chauffeur" seen with Maree, was charged with making material false statements, modifying $1,000 certificates of deposit (CDs) from the Melvin bank to read $100,000 and using them to obtain $200,000 from the Chandler State Bank in Tyler to finance the purchase. It was revealed that Moon had been interviewed by the FBI two days before Ranchlander was ordered closed and had told an agent about the altered CDs. Shaid had previously been convicted of bank fraud in 1972 and was paroled in 1978; he was arrested on a routine visit to his parole officer, though after Ranchlander closed, he may have briefly left the country. He owned an estate on Lake Palestine near Tyler, where he lived with Maree, as well as two airplanes, multiple limousines including a Rolls-Royce, four boats, and one yacht.

Ranchlander officials became involved in attempts to buy broadcast stations in Texas. Days after the revelation that Shaid owned the bank, the San Angelo Standard-Times revealed that former bank president Roger W. Pipkin III was listed as the primary owner of Baron Radio Corporation, the proposed buyer of San Angelo radio station KBIL (92.9 FM). Pipkin denied any involvement or even knowledge of the filing, which had been prepared by Lawrence Ludka, also a Ranchlander associate. KBIL's owner then withdrew the application. Pipkin had also been used in Shaid's successful effort to take over the First State Bank of Wells.

Attention was drawn to other dealings between Ranchlander and broadcast stations after 35-year-old Peter W. Dean, who had organized a company known as Central Texas Factors with Shaid, Moon, and Ludka, was found dead on his father's farm in Comal County on December 21. Central Texas Factors had been set up in October 1981 to purchase uncollected advertising accounts of KVEO-TV, a new television station in Brownsville. A year later, the owners of KVEO-TV sued Central Texas Factors and its principals, claiming that Dean and Ludka were splitting the revenues from the accounts without their consent; Dean had filed to force the station into bankruptcy. A medical examiner would ultimately conclude that Dean died of cyanide poisoning. Pipkin was a shareholder of Sunrise Broadcasting, which held a construction permit to build a new TV station on channel 14 at Tyler; Ludka's wife was the president.

Shaid's trial opened in early April 1983, covering fraud committed against not just the Ranchlander but three other Texas banks, which together were defrauded out of more than $775,000; one of these was the Interfirst Bank of Abilene, which held 70 percent of Ranchlander National Bank as collateral for one of the fraudulent loans to Maree. Moon testified that she had known of Shaid's efforts; she signed a plea agreement with federal prosecutors, pleading guilty to a charge of conspiracy to make a false statement in exchange for testimony. She had fled after telling Shaid she had destroyed documents on microfilm at his request; in actuality, she had driven to San Antonio to tell FBI agents about the fraud and to get away from Shaid. Pipkin pleaded guilty to charge of failure to report a felony. Shaid also received fraudulent loans in the names of other associates. The 12-person jury deliberated less than four hours before finding Shaid guilty of all 19 counts of bank and mail fraud; in June, he was sentenced to 35 years in prison at the United States Penitentiary, Terre Haute. Moon received a three-year suspended sentence in August.

While the trial was going on, in April, the Commercial State Bank of Houston foreclosed on the restaurant and put the facility on the market. By the end of that month, the FDIC had paid out more than $3 million to 444 bank depositors and hoped to be able to generate a dividend for other creditors.

In 1984, U.S. district attorney Bob Wortham testified to Congress on the Shaid case, a file that a feature article in American Banker magazine called "a dime-store novel". The Ranchlander failure was included in a congressional report published later that year, Federal Response to Criminal Misconduct and Insider Abuse in the Nation's Financial Institutions. The report laid blame at the Office of the Comptroller of the Currency for insufficient investigation into the credentials of Maree and others in connection with the 1981 change of control.
