= KFYN (AM) =

- Bonham, Texas; United States
- Broadcast area: Texoma
- Frequency: 1420 kHz
- Branding: Rewind 103.9

Programming
- Format: Classic hits
- Affiliations: Texas State Network

Ownership
- Owner: Vision Media Group, Inc.
- Sister stations: KFYN-FM; KLOW

History
- First air date: May 20, 1948
- Last air date: February 2026
- Call sign meaning: "Know Fannin Your Neighbor"

Technical information
- Licensing authority: FCC
- Facility ID: 6347
- Class: D
- Power: 250 watts (day); 148 watts (night)
- Transmitter coordinates: 33°34′40.4″N 96°9′55.9″W
- Translator: 103.9 K280GZ (Bonham)

Links
- Public license information: Public file; LMS
- Webcast: Listen live
- Website: radiorewind1039.com

KFYN (1420 AM, "Rewind 103.9") was a class D radio station that broadcast a classic hits format. Licensed to Bonham, Texas, United States, it served the Texoma area. KFYN's studios were located in downtown Paris. KFYN was owned by Vision Media Group, Inc.

== History ==
KFYN first began broadcasting on May 20, 1948, as a daytime-only station with 250 watts.

KFYN started adding classic country into its Top 40 country rotation in December 2013 until it ultimately became fully classic country in January 2014.

In April 2016, KFYN added an FM translator simulcast on 95.7 FM. At the same time, the classic country format was updated to a mix of 7190s outlaw country and classic red dirt in addition to the regular 1960s/1970s country gold.

In late July 2016, KFYN flipped to a classic country format, shifting its focus to 1980s/1990s hot country hits while rebranding to "Kickin' Country".

On September 1, 2021, at 12 PM, KFYN completed the move of its FM translator to 103.9 FM while simultaneously changing to a classic hits format as "Rewind 103.9".

The Federal Communications Commission (FCC) cancelled the station's license on February 11, 2026. KFYN had not operated under any authorized facilities since October 14, 2023, and did not respond to FCC inquiries.
