= KHFI-FM =

Contemporary hit radio station in Austin, Texas

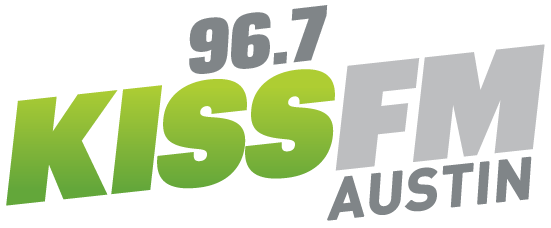
- Georgetown, Texas; United States
- Broadcast area: Greater Austin
- Frequency: 96.7 MHz (HD Radio)
- Branding: 96-7 KISS-FM

Programming
- Language: English
- Format: Contemporary hit radio
- Subchannels: HD2: 1980s hits HD3: Retro (bilingual classic hits)
- Affiliations: iHeartRadio; Premiere Networks

Ownership
- Owner: iHeartMedia; (iHM Licenses, LLC)
- Sister stations: KASE-FM; KPEZ; KVET; KVET-FM

History
- First air date: March 1, 1972
- Former call signs: KGTN-FM (1972–1987); KQFX (1987–1990)
- Former frequencies: 96.5 MHz (1987–1989)
- Call sign meaning: Hi-Fi (High fidelity)

Technical information
- Licensing authority: FCC
- Facility ID: 11948
- Class: C1
- ERP: 100,000 watts
- HAAT: 290 meters (950 ft)
- Transmitter coordinates: 30.322°N 97.801°W
- Translator: HD2: 103.1 K276EL (Austin)

Links
- Public license information: Public file; LMS
- Webcast: Listen live (via iHeartRadio); HD2: Listen live (via iHeartRadio); HD3: Listen live (via iHeartRadio)
- Website: 967kissfm.com; HD2: 1031austin.iheart.com

KHFI-FM (96.7 FM) is a commercial radio station licensed to Georgetown, Texas, and serving the Greater Austin market. Owned by iHeartMedia, it airs a contemporary hit radio format, branded as "KISS-FM". It shares studios and offices with other iHeart stations in the Penn Field complex in the South Congress district (or "SoCo") of south central Austin within walking distance of St. Edward's University. It had previously been located in a downtown Austin office building off Barton Springs Road.

KHFI-FM broadcasts with an effective radiated power (ERP) of 100,000 watts, from a transmitter located off Waymaker Way in Austin, amid numerous towers for other FM and TV stations. KHFI-FM broadcasts in the HD Radio format.

== History ==
=== KGTN-FM and KQFX ===
former logo

96.7 signed on the air from Georgetown as KGTN-FM on March 1, 1972. It was co-owned with KGTN (1530 AM, now KZNX), the town's daytime-only AM station, and broadcast with 3,000 watts, providing nighttime service to extend KGTN's broadcast day.

In 1986, KGTN-AM-FM was sold to Joyner Broadcasting, which owned three stations in Illinois, for $5 million. The next year, Capitol Broadcasting Company of Birmingham, Alabama, bought the adult contemporary-formatted FM alone and announced plans to move it toward Austin. The Federal Communications Commission (FCC) approved a power upgrade for the station to 28,500 watts, enough to cover Austin and its close-in suburbs; a new transmitter site was constructed near Sandy Creek at Lake Travis and the frequency was changed to 96.5 MHz. The station became classic hits-formatted "96.5 The Fox", KQFX. Later, the station changed to an oldies format and moved its frequency back to 96.7 MHz in order to avoid interference issues with a Houston station. A final signal upgrade to 100,000 watts was completed at the beginning of 1990.

=== KHFI-FM moves down ===
In May 1990, Joyner reacquired KQFX, along with a station in his home market of Raleigh, North Carolina, for a total of $13 million. The transaction's timing turned out to be instrumental in determining the future course of 96.7. At the same time, at 98.1 MHz, KHFI-FM (now KVET-FM) was being purchased by Spur Austin. In September, Spur reached a deal—the second ever radio local marketing agreement—to simulcast KVET on the 98.1 frequency, displacing contemporary hits outlet KHFI-FM ("K-98"). On September 15, Joyner moved to fire the entire airstaff of the underperforming KQFX and brought the entire airstaff, format and call letters of KHFI-FM to 96.7 MHz, creating "K96.7".

In 1992, KHFI dropped the "K96.7" moniker and began calling itself "The New 96.7 KHFI"; at the same time, new owners The Rusk Corporation leased out KBTS (93.3 FM), KHFI's direct competitor, and turned it into KMXX, "Mix 93.3". At the end of that year, KHFI-FM was bought by San Antonio-based Clear Channel Communications for $3.5 million.

On August 2, 2001, KHFI re-launched as "96.7 KISS-FM"; Clear Channel owns the rights to the KISS-FM brand, which it utilizes for Top 40 stations in Los Angeles, Boston and other cities. Today, iHeart has the 18-34 year-old demographic for contemporary music in Austin covered, with KHFI playing mainstream Top 40, while sister station KPEZ ("102.3 The Beat") airs rhythmic contemporary music.

=== The Bobby Bones Show ===
In 2002, KHFI became the flagship station for The Bobby Bones Show, syndicated by Premiere Networks, an iHeart subsidiary. Bones, based at KHFI's studios, was named "Austin Radio Personality of the Year" for 4 years running. The award is given yearly at the Austin Music Awards. In 2008, The Bobby Bones Show received its first award for "Austin Radio Program of the Year." Also that year, KHFI was named "Austin Radio Station of the Year."

In February 2013, The Bobby Bones Show was relaunched as a country music show. In addition, Bones moved to Nashville, making iHeart-owned WSIX-FM his new flagship station. As a result, Bones' Austin affiliate became co-owned KASE-FM.

Bones was replaced on KHFI with Elvis Duran and the Morning Show, which is syndicated by Premiere Networks from WHTZ in New York City. In February 2016, the morning show was changed to The Billy The Kidd Morning Show, featuring local DJs Billy the Kidd and Anne Hudson as hosts.

== HD Radio ==
In 2024, KHFI-HD2 began broadcasting translator station 103.1 K276EL, which airs an 1980s hits format branded "103.1 Austin's 80s Station". The station features longtime Austin morning personality Sandy McIlree’s syndicated “The Sandy Show” weekday mornings, hosted by McIlree and his wife Tricia. McIlree is best known for his long run co-hosting mornings on KAMX with JB Hager from 1995 to 2013. 103.1 K276EL was originally broadcast on the HD2 sub-channel of sister station KVET-FM.

Broadcast translator for KHFI-HD2
Call sign	Frequency	City of license	FID	ERP (W)	HAAT	Class	Transmitter coordinates	FCC info
K276EL	103.1 FM	Austin, Texas	140611	250	364.8 m (1,197 ft)	D	30°19′24″N 97°48′00″W	LMS
