= KTXX-FM =

Radio station in Bee Cave–Austin, Texas, U.S.

Simulcasts KZNX Creedmoor
- Bee Cave, Texas; United States
- Broadcast area: Austin-Round Rock metropolitan area
- Frequency: 104.9 MHz (HD Radio)
- Branding: La Raza 95.1 y 104.9

Programming
- Format: Regional Mexican
- Subchannels: HD2: KTAE simulcast (Spanish CHR); HD3: Regional Mexican Oldies "Leyendas 98.5"

Ownership
- Owner: Norsan Media; (Norsan Media Group, L.P.)
- Sister stations: KTAE; KOKE-FM; KNMF

History
- First air date: 1984 (as KFFQ Llano, Texas)
- Former call signs: KFFQ (1984–1985); KLKM (1985–1995); KBAE (1995–2000); KXXS (2000–2007); KXBT (2007–2009); KHHL (10/2009–11/2009)

Technical information
- Licensing authority: FCC
- Facility ID: 40762
- Class: A
- ERP: 3,200 watts
- HAAT: 136.2 meters (447 ft)
- Transmitter coordinates: 30°14′56.80″N 97°54′5.20″W
- Translators: HD2: 105.3 K287FG (Austin); HD3: 98.5 K253AN (Sunset Valley)

Links
- Public license information: Public file; LMS
- Webcast: Listen Live; Listen Live (HD3)
- Website: La Raza 95.1 Online; leyendasaustin.com (HD3)

KTXX-FM (104.9 MHz, "La Raza 95.1 y 104.9") is a commercial radio station licensed to Bee Cave, Texas, and serving the Greater Austin metropolitan area. The station is owned by Norsan Media and broadcasts a Regional Mexican radio format simulcast from KZNX. KTXX-FM's transmitter is located on State Highway 71 in southwest Austin. The station has studios and offices along Loop 360 in southwest Austin.

KTXX-FM broadcasts in HD Radio. Its HD2 digital subchannel simulcasts the Spanish-language Contemporary hit radio format heard on co-owned KTAE, which feeds FM translator 105.3 K287FG. The HD3 digital subchannel airs a Regional Mexican Oldies format, which feeds FM translator 98.5 K253AN known as "Leyendas 98.5".

== Programming ==
KTXX-FM currently simulcasts KZNX, also known as "La Raza 95.1", a Spanish-language Regional Mexican formatted station also owned by Norsan Media. The 95.1 in the branding stems from the frequency of KZNX's FM translator, K236AY.

Prior to its 2023 format change, KTXX-FM was branded as "The Horn," in reference to the Texas Longhorns. It was the flagship station for University of Texas at Austin athletics from 2015 until 2023. KTXX-FM aired local sports programming during the day and programming from Houston-based SportsMap on nights and weekends.

== History ==
=== KFFQ and KLKM ===
The station first signed on in 1984 as KFFQ at 104.7, broadcasting country music. It was originally licensed to Llano and was owned by Duane Fox.

In 1988, KFFQ was acquired by Maxagrid Broadcasting, which moved the station to 104.9 and switched to a beautiful music format as KLKM. In 2000, the station changed its city of license to Dripping Springs, Texas and rebranded to "Digital 104.9" under a new call sign, KXXS.

=== 104.9 The Beat ===
In February 2007, "Digital 104.9" moved to 92.5, to make room for rhythmic contemporary station KXBT as "Beat 104.9". This was the third incarnation of "The Beat", which originally launched on 104.3 in 1998 as KQBT. The staff and lineup from 104.3 "The Beat" remained intact. A new call sign of KXBT was assigned to 104.9 some six months after the re-brand."104.9 KXBT/Dripping Springs, TX".

On September 29, 2008, KXBT became a simulcast of KXXS. This allowed the station to be heard around Greater Austin, with KXBT serving the western portion and KXXS covering the eastern part of the market. The simulcast was called "Digital 104.9 y 92.5". The "Digital" simulcast was broken up in mid-2009, when 104.9 flipped to Regional Mexican. The Spanish Contemporary format was retained on 92.5. "The Beat" would later air on KFMK and later KPEZ.

=== The Horn ===
On November 2, 2009, the format changed to all-sports, branded as "104.9 The Horn". The brand is a nod to the Texas Longhorns. Initially, KTXX-FM aired local sports programming during the day and carried ESPN Radio programming at nights and on weekends.

On January 2, 2014, ESPN Radio programming was dropped, with KTXX-FM shifting to a hybrid of sports talk and classic hits. Morning and afternoon drive time, as well as the noon hour, remained local sports talk, while other non-sports hours aired classic hits. On May 5, 2014, additional sports talk was added. The schedule had sports talk from 6 am to 7 pm and classic hits the remainder of the time, unless a sporting event or specialty program was being broadcast.

Former logo as "The Horn" from 2015 to 2023.

In February 2015, The Horn dropped the classic hits portion of its schedule and began airing sports full-time with NBC Sports Radio programming heard at night and on weekends, and NBC Sports updates during the day. NBC Sports was later replaced with SB Nation Radio (now SportsMap), based in Houston. KTXX-FM's city of license also moved to Bee Cave, Texas, although its studios and transmitter remain in Austin.

On June 16, 2015, KTXX-FM became the flagship station of the Texas Longhorns.

On July 12, 2023, owner Genuine Austin Radio announced that KTXX-FM would drop the sports format on August 1, though it would continue on KTAE and FM translator K270CO (101.9 FM). The Longhorns announced a partnership with iHeartMedia stations KVET and KVET-FM the following day. On August 2, Norsan Media announced that it had acquired KTXX-FM and K287FG, making the station a sister to Spanish-language KZNX. KTXX-FM began simulcasting KZNX, while K287FG began airing a Spanish-language CHR format.

On April 19, 2024, Norsan Media announced that it had reached a deal to buy the rest of Genuine Austin Radio outright.

== HD Radio ==
On June 1, 2024, KTXX-FM launched a regional Mexican oldies format on its HD2 subchannel, branded as "Leyendas 98.5".
