= KFMK =

Contemporary Christian music radio station in Round Rock, Texas, United States

- Round Rock, Texas; United States
- Broadcast area: Austin-Round Rock metropolitan area
- Frequency: 105.9 MHz (HD Radio)

Programming
- Format: Contemporary Christian
- Subchannels: HD2: K-Love Eras; HD3: Radio Nueva Vida
- Network: K-Love

Ownership
- Owner: Educational Media Foundation
- Sister stations: KLLR, KVLR, KMLR, KYLR

History
- First air date: July 7, 1998
- Call sign meaning: Frequency Modulation

Technical information
- Licensing authority: FCC
- Facility ID: 3222
- Class: C2
- ERP: 4,500 watts
- HAAT: 397 meters (1,302 ft)
- Transmitter coordinates: 30.323°N 97.800°W

Links
- Public license information: Public file; LMS
- Webcast: Listen Live
- Website: klove.com

KFMK (105.9 FM) is an Austin, Texas radio station operating a contemporary Christian format as an affiliate of the K-Love radio network. It is licensed to Round Rock, Texas with an ERP of 4,500 watts from a transmitter site near West Lake Hills, and is currently owned by Educational Media Foundation.

== History ==
=== As "Jammin 105.9" ===
KFMK was launched on November 25, 1998 as the Rhythmic Oldies-formatted "Jammin' 105.9", after initial signal testing and stunting as alternative rocker "The Planet 105.9", which began on July 7 of that year. From the inception it played mostly R&B, Classic Soul, Motown, and Disco from the 1960s and 1970s only. In 2003, the station gradually added more songs from the 1980s and 1990s to the playlist, while at the same time having the 60s and 70s R&B in heavy rotation. Even then it occasionally debuted new music, though this was rare in contrast to traditional Urban AC formatted R&B stations. With this approach, KFMK challenged KKMJ (mainstream AC), KAMX (hot AC), and rhythmic KQBT (later KXBT)."Jammin' 105.9 Austin 11 29 98 KFMK No Spots, No Deejays Unscoped".

Finally, in 2006, KFMK revamped the playlist and dropped the 60s and 70s music altogether and instead played more music from the 1980s to present, more along the lines of a Rhythmic Adult Contemporary. This was done to accommodate the Kidd Kraddick in the Morning Show that aired on KFMK. On October 13, 2006, the station rebranded as "The New Jammin' 105-9" and dropped all on-air personalities, except for Kraddick. Part of the rebranding included former tweaking of the format and logo to a direction inspired by the "MOViN' format created by Alan Burns & Associates."105.9 KFMK/Round Rock, TX".

In the Fall of 2008, KFMK began playing current Rhythmic fare on weeknights and on weekend afternoons/nights, including current Hip-Hop product, trying to improve ratings. This failed, as the station was ranked #16 overall.

=== As "105.9 The Beat" ===
On September 15, 2009, at 5 a.m., after playing "Dance & Shout" by Shaggy, the station stunted for three hours playing rock using the “Planet” moniker (formerly used during its sign on in 1998), then segued into music of other genres, as well as airing "change" soundbites. At 9 a.m., the station officially flipped formats to a hip hop-leaning Rhythmic Contemporary station branded as "105.9 The Beat". The station dropped Kidd Kraddick's morning show, but kept airing Ryan Seacrest, most likely due to a contract issue (this ended on May 19, 2010). This was the fourth incarnation for "The Beat", as the branding originated on KQBT/KXBT (now KLQB) in 1998, before moving to KXBT (now KTXX) in 2007. (It was relaunched under Clear Channel's trademarked banner only a year after KXBT dropped it.)

=== As "The River" ===
On May 21, 2010, Clear Channel announced that it planned to move KFMK's Hip Hop format to the 102.3 frequency, where it has better coverage and a more powerful signal, starting May 31. Sister station KPEZ, known as "The River", which resided at the 102.3 frequency, moved its format over to the 105.9 signal. The River aired a contemporary Christian music format.

=== As "Spirit 105.9" ===
On June 9, 2010, it was announced that CRISTA Broadcasting, a division of CRISTA Ministries has reached an agreement to purchase KFMK. On July 26, 2010, the station changed ownership from Clear Channel Communications to Aloha Trust LLC. On September 20, 2010, at 4:20 p.m., KFMK fully shifted to a contemporary Christian format and re-branded as "Spirit 105.9".

=== Sale to EMF and switch to K-Love ===
On September 22, 2020, CRISTA announced that it would sell KFMK to Educational Media Foundation for $6 million. On November 1, 2020, EMF began airing EMF's K-Love satellite format. The deal also included the lease of an HD subchannel on KVLR to air programming from CRISTA for two years after closing. The sale was consummated on November 18, 2020.
