= KASE-FM =

Country music radio station in Austin, Texas

- Austin, Texas; United States
- Broadcast area: Greater Austin
- Frequency: 100.7 MHz (HD Radio)
- Branding: KASE 100.7

Programming
- Language: English
- Format: Country music
- Subchannels: HD2: Alt 97.5 (Alternative rock)
- Affiliations: Premiere Networks; iHeartRadio; Austin FC (HD2)

Ownership
- Owner: iHeartMedia; (iHM Licenses, LLC)
- Sister stations: KHFI-FM; KPEZ; KVET; KVET-FM

History
- First air date: March 30, 1969
- Call sign meaning: Pronounced case

Technical information
- Licensing authority: FCC
- Facility ID: 35849
- Class: C0
- ERP: 100,000 watts
- HAAT: 363 meters (1,191 ft)
- Transmitter coordinates: 30.3233°N 97.7999°W
- Translator: HD2: 97.5 K248CU (Austin)

Links
- Public license information: Public file; LMS
- Webcast: Listen live (via iHeartRadio); Listen live (via iHeartRadio) (HD2)
- Website: kase1007.iheart.com; alt975austin.iheart.com (HD2)

KASE-FM (100.7 MHz "KASE 100.7") is a commercial radio station licensed to Austin, Texas, owned by iHeartMedia and airing a country music radio format. It shares studios and offices with four sister stations in the Plaza of the Lake complex off Loop 360 in the Westlake district of west Austin, within walking distance of Pennybacker Bridge. KASE-FM's transmitter site is off Waymaker Way in Austin, amid towers for other FM and TV stations.

KASE-FM broadcasts in the HD Radio format. It airs alternative rock on its HD2 subchannel, branded as "Alt 97.5," which is also carried on translator station K248CU on 97.5 MHz in Austin. KASE-FM and K248CU can also be heard on the iHeartRadio platform.

== Programming ==
Weekday mornings, The Bobby Bones Show from Nashville is heard on KASE-FM. It is syndicated by Premiere Networks, a subsidiary of iHeartMedia. On Saturday and Sunday mornings, KASE-FM features "The Best of Bobby Bones." Overnight, KASE-FM carries After MidNite with Granger Smith. The rest of the schedule is staffed by voice-tracked DJs from outside Austin.

In Austin, iHeartMedia owns two country stations. 98.1 KVET-FM plays of mix of current, recent and classic country, while KASE-FM concentrates on more contemporary country titles.

== History ==
=== Beautiful music ===
KASE-FM first signed on the air on March 30, 1969, playing an automated beautiful music format. It was co-owned with AM 1300 KVET, a popular AM country station. KASE-FM transmitted with an effective radiated power of 26,500 watts, a quarter of its current power.

=== Switch to country ===
After a little over a decade on the air, management saw an opening for a new country format in Austin. While KVET would continue to play an older, personality style of country and western music, KASE was designed to appeal to younger country fans.

Bill Mayne, KASE Program Director at the time, recalled in a 2010 interview, the Friday afternoon in September 1981 when KASE "came out of Mantovani and went into the Waylon Jennings song "Are You Ready for the Country" and had every dentist's office, nursing home and doctor's office in the city of Austin calling to complain."

The "Continuous Country" format became a hit with Austin listeners and has consistently been voted by radio general managers as one of the top twenty "Most Admired Stations" in America. It was the first station to win the "Station of the Year" award from the Country Music Association four times and was given its second Billboard Magazine "Station of the Year" award in 1997.

In 1990, KVET (AM) began simulcasting on 98.1 MHz. KASE continued to target adults in the 18-34 and 18-49 demographics, while KVET-FM targeted the 25-54-year-old demographic.

=== Change in ownership ===
In 1998, KVET, Inc., which owned KVET-AM-FM and KASE-FM, sold its stations to Capstar, Inc. Capstar was later merged into Clear Channel Communications, which is known today as iHeartMedia.

KVET and KASE have historically been Austin's top country stations, staving off many competitors over the decades. KASE-FM has also been nominated for the Country Music Association (CMA) "Large Market Station of the Year" Award numerous times.

=== 2024 rebrand ===
On March 11, 2024, after using the brand "KASE 101" since its launch in 1981, KASE rebranded as "KASE 100.7", referencing its actual frequency.

== KASE-FM HD2/K248CU ==
KASE-FM HD2 launched an LGBT-oriented dance format via translator K248CU (97.5 FM) on January 12, 2016. The format lasted until January 26, 2018, when it changed to its current Alternative Rock format as "Alt 97.5". In 2021, KASE-FM-HD2/K248CU was named as Austin FC's English-language radio broadcaster.

== Previous logo ==
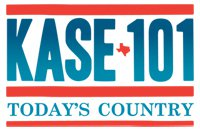
