= KWTR (Big Lake, Texas) =

Big Lake, Texas; United States
- Frequency: 104.1 MHz
- Branding: West Texas Radio

Programming
- Language: English
- Format: Defunct

Ownership
- Owner: Woodrow Michael Warren

History
- First air date: 2001
- Call sign meaning: West Texas Radio

Technical information
- Facility ID: 86625
- Class: A
- ERP: 500 watts
- HAAT: 19 meters (62 ft)
- Transmitter coordinates: 31°11′54″N 101°27′45″W

KWTR (104.1 FM, "West Texas Radio") was an American radio station licensed to serve the community of Big Lake, Texas, United States. Established in 2001, the station's broadcast license was held throughout its 10-year existence by Woodrow Michael Warren. Before going dark for the final time, KWTR broadcast a country music format.

== History ==
In May 1997, Woodrow Michael Warren applied to the Federal Communications Commission (FCC) for a construction permit for a new Class A broadcast radio station. The FCC granted this permit on June 12, 1998, with a scheduled expiration date of June 12, 2001. The new station was assigned call sign "KWTR" on July 12, 1998. After construction and testing were completed, the station was granted its broadcast license on August 29, 2001.

In June 2001, KWTR applied for a new construction permit to upgrade its signal from a 500 watt Class A to a 100,000 watt Class C1 broadcast facility able to serve the Odessa-Midland area. The FCC granted the permit on September 14, 2001, with a scheduled expiration of September 14, 2004.

Less than a year after receiving its initial broadcast license, KWTR fell silent on July 21, 2002. In their August 2002 request to the FCC for special temporary authority to remain silent, station management cited financial issues as the reason for the lack of broadcast activity. The FCC granted the remain-silent authority on September 3, 2002, with a scheduled expiration of March 3, 2003. On April 25, 2003, the Commission extended this one further time to July 21, 2003. After that date, the station would have been silent for a full year and the station's broadcast license would be subject to automatic forfeiture.

The station resumed broadcasting in time to save its license but on August 18, 2003, KWTR fell silent again. The FCC granted remain-silent authority on August 26, 2003, with a planned February 26, 2004, expiration. In February 2004, station management cited technical issues in requesting an extension of this authority. The FCC granted the extension on March 23, 2004, with a caution that broadcasting must resume before August 18, 2004, or its license would be forfeit. The station returned to the air briefly on the evening on August 17, 2004, from temporary facilities after the work crew installing the new antenna system was forced from the area by an infestation of killer bees. The station owner mounted the antenna on a metal pole and broadcast for several hours to preserve the station's license. Regular service resumed on August 19, 2004, after a new tower was erected and the antenna installed.

In October 2004, the station applied for a new construction permit, identical to the previous upgrade permit, after the original expired without the upgrade being completed. After overcoming a series of objections, the new permit was granted on February 9, 2006, with a scheduled expiration date of February 9, 2009. After overcoming an objection to this permit by the Federal Aviation Administration over tower placement, a new permit was issued on April 17, 2009, with a scheduled expiration of April 17, 2012.

In February 2009, Woodrow Michael Warren reached an agreement to sell KWTR to Sierra Communications, Inc., for a reported $350,000 in cash. The FCC approved the sale on April 17, 2009, but the deal was never completed and Warren filed a notification of non-consummation with the FCC on October 25, 2009.

In the midst of the abortive sale, the station fell silent again at 7:07 a.m. on May 7, 2009, and notified the FCC in June 2009. In their application for special temporary authority to remain silent, KWTR management cited the loss of "electric and other utilities" at the licensed transmitter site as the reason they halted broadcast operations. The FCC granted the requested authority on July 24, 2009, with a scheduled expiration of January 20, 2010. In January 2010, the station applied for an extension which was granted on March 30, 2010, with a mandatory expiration of May 7, 2010. The station returned to the air on the evening of May 6, 2010, from a new transmitter site.

This proved short-lived as "severe lightning and tornado activity" struck Reagan County and the station's transmission system was damaged. Rather than continue at low power, the station signed off at 8:17 a.m. on May 15, 2010. In June 2010, the station applied to the FCC for another remain-silent authority while repairs were being affected. The Commission granted this authority on August 30, 2010, with a February 28, 2011, expiration. Citing "a lack of qualified personnel" to install the repaired equipment, KWTR management applied for an extension to their authority in February 2011.

However, the station never returned to the air and in October 2011 the FCC ruled that the KWTR broadcast license had "expired as a matter of law" at 12:01 a.m. on May 16, 2011. After the station's broadcast license was cancelled, the call sign was deleted from the FCC database on October 6, 2011.
