= KEVT =

Radio station in Sahuarita, Arizona

- Sahuarita, Arizona; United States
- Broadcast area: Tucson
- Frequency: 1210 kHz

Programming
- Language: Spanish
- Format: Christian radio

Ownership
- Owner: One Mart Corporation

History
- First air date: December 19, 1985
- Last air date: May 4, 2021
- Former call signs: KBCD (1984, CP); KQTL (1984–2007)

Technical information
- Facility ID: 19119
- Class: B
- Power: 10,000 watts day 1,000 watts night
- Transmitter coordinates: 32°02′4.00″N 110°56′45.00″W

KEVT (1210 AM) was a radio station licensed to Sahuarita, Arizona, United States, and served the Tucson area. KEVT was owned by One Mart Corporation.

== History ==
=== KQTL ===
In December 1982, various applicants filed to build a new radio station at 1210 kHz, which would serve the Sahuarita area. The lead investor in winning applicant El Saguarito Broadcasting Company, Phil Richardson, sold the construction permit to a group headed by former KXEW owner Ernesto Portillo, who launched the station as Spanish-language outlet KQTL in 1985. One of the minority investors of the new station was Raúl Grijalva, then on the board of the Tucson Unified School District. The station's Spanish contemporary music format continued into the 1990s; KQTL was sold in 1996 to CIMA Broadcasting, in which Portillo and other people involved with El Saguarito were investors, for $600,000.

As a result of its sale to the Radio Única Spanish talk network in 2000, KQTL shed its music format and flipped to talk. After Radio Única declared bankruptcy, it sold its stations to Multicultural Broadcasting in a $150 million deal in 2003.

=== Sale to One Mart ===
Four years later, Armando Zamora's One Mart Corporation, which was in the process of selling its station at 1030 kHz (then KEVT, now KVOI), acquired KQTL. Upon taking control, the KEVT call letters, which had been on 1030 and prior to that on the 690 frequency (now KCEE), were relocated to 1210, and the station adopted a Regional Mexican format as "La Raza". Financial difficulties led La Raza to suspend operations on July 19, 2010; at the time, Zamora's house was being foreclosed on, and One Mart's accounting firm was hit with $277,000 in liens by the Internal Revenue Service. KEVT resumed operations on September 15, 2010; after the sale, it changed formats to Spanish Christian as "Radio Vida".

=== PowerTalk ===
In 2014, a group led by talker Jim Parisi leased out the station and launched "PowerTalk", the station's first English-language format. The station aired local talk during the day and Fox Sports Radio on nights and weekends. Additionally, KEVT became the first Tucson-area station since 2008 to carry Arizona State Sun Devils football.

On February 15, 2016, the station went silent again due to company financial difficulties; KEVT would not return to the air until November 1 of that year. As a result of KEVT going silent, PowerTalk became an internet-only station; the operators cited the high costs of broadcasting for their move online.

=== Classic country and return to Radio Vida ===
Upon returning to the air on November 1, 2016, KEVT began broadcasting a classic country music format. Eventually, said format turned into a full simulcast of KAVV, a classic country outlet broadcasting from Benson; however, on April 15, 2018, the lease ended because of lack of advertiser support. The station reverted to Christian programming under the Radio Vida name.

On May 6, 2021, KEVT's license was cancelled at its request based on an email from the station's counsel on May 4.
