= KLOW =

- Reno, Texas; United States
- Broadcast area: Paris, Texas
- Frequency: 98.9 MHz
- Branding: Trumpet Radio 98.9

Programming
- Format: Contemporary Christian

Ownership
- Owner: Vision Media Group, Inc.
- Sister stations: KFYN-FM

History
- First air date: 2009

Technical information
- Licensing authority: FCC
- Facility ID: 165973
- Class: A
- ERP: 6,000 watts
- HAAT: 100 meters (330 ft)
- Transmitter coordinates: 33°45′26.3″N 95°32′15.4″W

Links
- Public license information: Public file; LMS
- Website: trumpetradio989.com

KLOW (98.9 FM, Trumpet Radio) is a radio station broadcasting a contemporary Christian music format. Licensed to Reno, Texas, United States, the station serves the Paris, Texas, area. The station is owned by Vision Media Group, Inc.
