= The Bobby Bones Show =

American early morning country music radio show

Bobby Bones Show
- Genre: Comedy, talk, music
- Running time: 5 hours (including commercials)
- Country of origin: United States
- Home station: WSIX-FM (Nashville)
- Syndicates: Premiere Networks
- Hosted by: Bobby Bones; Lunchbox; Amy
- Starring: Eddie; Raymundo; Scuba Steve; Morgan (#2); Mike D.; Abby
- Created by: Bobby Bones; KHFI-FM (Austin)
- Produced by: Raymundo & Scuba Steve
- Executive producer: Scuba Steve
- Original release: 2003 – present
- Website: www.bobbybones.com
- Podcast: www.iheart.com/podcast/139-bobby-bones-show-25100459/

The Bobby Bones Show is an American, nationally syndicated country music radio show aired during the morning hours. The Bobby Bones Show, which originally aired from Austin, Texas, now broadcasts from studios at WSIX-FM in Nashville. Premiere Networks, a subsidiary of iHeartMedia, syndicated the show internationally in Halifax and Manchester, UK. The program is broadcast on weekdays between 5:00 AM and 10:00 AM Central Time with a "Top 30 Countdown” show aired on Saturday mornings and hosted by Bones. Starting in 2019, a new show called “The Women of iHeartCountry”, was hosted by Bones’s co-host Amy, in which she interviews female country stars, and plays only country songs by female country stars. The show is broadcast between 6:00 AM and 7:00 AM Central Time on Sundays. In some radio markets, the show is recorded and heard in the evening; this is especially true in Canada, where it is carried by Bell Media Radio's Pure Country network.

The program is also heard nationally via iHeartRadio, iHeartMedia's free all-in-one streaming music and live radio service digital service. In June 2014, it was announced that Bobby Bones had signed a long-term contract extension with iHeartMedia (formerly Clear Channel Media and Entertainment).

Prior to 2013, The Bobby Bones Show was a morning show for Top 40 stations, also syndicated by Premiere Networks. Jay Shannon was the program director. On July 18, 2011, it was announced that Bones had signed a three-year extension to do mornings for Clear Channel's KHFI-FM Austin, and also signed a deal with Premiere for syndication rights.

Bobby Bones is accompanied by co-hosts Lunchbox (Dan Chappell) and Amy (Moffett-Brown), along with Eddie (Garcia), Raymundo (Raymond Slater), Mike D. (Deestro), Morgan #2 (Huelsman), and Abby Anderson.

== The Raging Idiots ==
The Raging Idiots is a band which features Bobby Bones and Eddie Garcia from the Bobby Bones Show. The Raging Idiots helped raise money for earthquake relief in Haiti, the St. Jude Children's Research Hospital in Memphis, and other charities. In 2013, after the BBS moved to Nashville, they were asked to perform in a charity event which resulted in their first public appearance. Their first concert outside of Nashville was in Wichita, Kansas. They have played over 40 charity shows and have raised over $1.5 million for charities.

On June 2, 2015, The Raging Idiots signed a record deal with Black River Entertainment. They released their debut album “The Critics Give It 5 Stars” which was a number one record on the comedy charts. From the album, the singles were: “If I Was Your Boyfriend” and “Fishing With My Dad”. The Raging Idiots released an EP titled “The Next Episode EP” where the lead single “Namaste” was a number one comedy song. Followed by “Chick-fil-A (...But It's Sunday)” which reached number three on the comedy charts.

On April 2, 2020, The Raging Idiots released a new album "Bobby Bones & the Raging Idiots (Live in Little Rock)" which featured songs recorded during the 2019 Bobby Bones & The Raging Idiots Tour.

== EAS Activation Incident ==
During the October 24, 2014 episode of The Bobby Bones Show, a segment discussed a test of the Emergency Alert System (EAS) that had interrupted a broadcast of Game 2 of the 2014 World Series on Nashville Fox affiliate WZTV. A clip was played of the 2011 national EAS test; due to how EAS operates, this "engaged the EAS equipment of certain other EAS participants" to re-transmit the Emergency Action Notification (EAN) from the test. In particular, the false test spread via outlets (including AT&T U-verse systems in several markets) that had not configured their EAS decoders to reject EAN messages that did not match the current date. In May 2015, iHeartMedia was fined $1 million by the FCC for playing EAS tones on-air outside of an emergency alert, and was directed to implement a three-year compliance plan, including the removal of EAS tones or any similar sounds from its audio libraries in order to prevent a similar incident.

== Awards and accomplishments ==
The Bobby Bones Show won the National On-Air Personality Award at the ACM Awards in 2014, 2016, 2018, and 2020. They won a CMA Award for National Personality in 2017 and 2019. On November 2, 2017, Bobby Bones was inducted into the National Radio Hall of Fame. He is the youngest inductee to ever receive this honor.
