= KGAS (AM) =

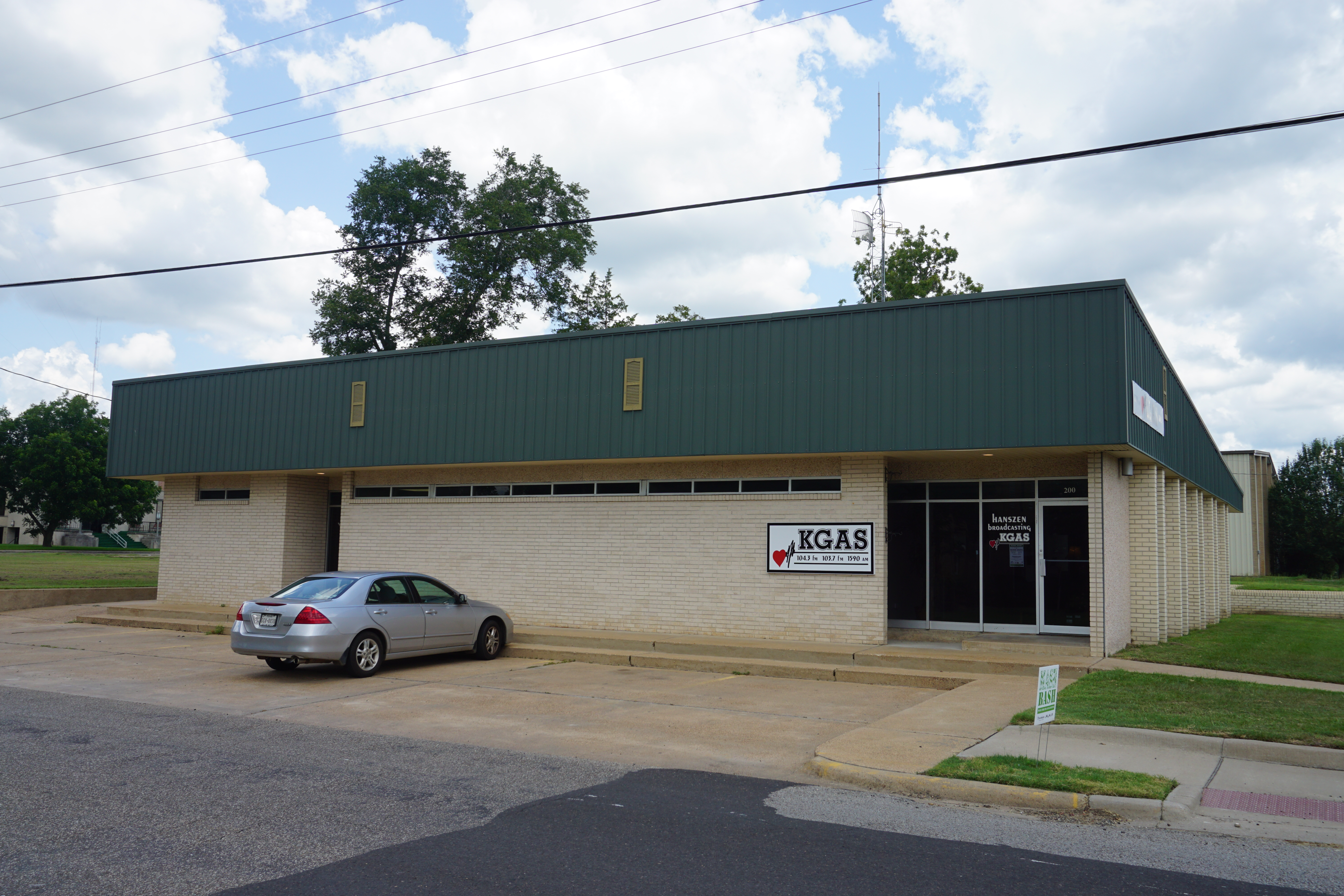
- KGAS Studios
- Carthage, Texas U.S.; United States
- Broadcast area: Panola County, Texas; De Soto Parish, Louisiana
- Frequency: 1590 kHz
- Branding: The Heartbeat of East Texas

Programming
- Format: Sports
- Affiliations: ESPN Radio

Ownership
- Owner: Wanda J. Hanszen and Jerry T. Hanszen; (Hanszen Broadcasting, Inc.)
- Sister stations: KGAS-FM, KMHT, KMHT-FM

History
- First air date: January 6, 1956
- Call sign meaning: natural gas (the area historically has produced oil and gas)

Technical information
- Licensing authority: FCC
- Facility ID: 31065
- Class: D
- Power: 2,500 watts (daytime); 128 watts (night)
- Transmitter coordinates: 32°09′12″N 94°18′52″W
- Translator: See § Translator

Links
- Public license information: Public file; LMS
- Website: KGAS website

KGAS (1590 AM) is a terrestrial radio station, paired with an FM translator, broadcasting a sports format with local news, weather, and sports interspersed. Licensed to Carthage, Texas, United States, the station serves the state line area of far East Texas and western Louisiana.

== Translators ==
Broadcast translator for KGAS
Call sign	Frequency	City of license	FID	ERP (W)	HAAT	Class	Transmitter coordinates	FCC info	Notes
K279CF	103.7 FM	Carthage, Texas	156995	250	50 m (164 ft)	D	32°09′17″N 94°19′15″W	LMS	First air date: September 8, 2014

== History ==
The facility received a License to Cover on January 6, 1956, as a 1 kilowatt daytime only facility, from a transmission site on Old Carthage-Deadwood Road, 0.2 mile east of the Carthage city limits. The station was first proposed in 1955 by Thomas Alford and F.E. Barr, as the Carthage Broadcasting Company, with the studios located at 318 East Sabine St. Carthage, Texas, 75633. The facility is currently owned by Wanda J. Hanszen and Jerry T. Hanszen, through licensee Hanszen Broadcasting, Inc.

In 2014, an FM translator was acquired by Hanszen Broadcasting to operate at channel 279 (103.7 MHz). The translator was issued a License to Cover on September 8, 2014. K279CF operates with 250 watts ERP, from an elevation of 50 meters height above average terrain.
