= KVET (AM) =

Radio station in Austin, Texas

- Austin, Texas; United States
- Broadcast area: Greater Austin
- Frequency: 1300 kHz
- Branding: AM 1300 The Zone

Programming
- Language: English
- Format: Sports
- Affiliations: Fox Sports Radio; Houston Texans; Round Rock Express; San Antonio Spurs; KTKR (San Antonio); Texas Longhorns

Ownership
- Owner: iHeartMedia; (iHM Licenses, LLC)
- Sister stations: KASE-FM; KHFI-FM; KPEZ; KVET-FM

History
- First air date: October 1, 1946
- Call sign meaning: Station was established by World War II veterans

Technical information
- Licensing authority: FCC
- Facility ID: 35850
- Class: B
- Power: 5,000 watts day 1,000 watts night
- Transmitter coordinates: 30°22′30.7″N 97°42′59″W

Links
- Public license information: Public file; LMS
- Webcast: Listen live (via iHeartRadio)
- Website: am1300thezone.iheart.com

KVET (1300 kHz) is an AM radio station in Austin, Texas. It is owned by iHeartMedia, and carries a sports radio format with both local sports shows and programming from Fox Sports Radio.

KVET uses a directional antenna, broadcasting at 5,000 watts to the northwest over the Texas Hill Country during the daytime and 1,000 watts to the south over central Austin at night. The transmitter site is just a few miles north of downtown, on Metric Boulevard. KVET shares studios and offices with four other sister stations in the Penn Field complex in the South Congress district (or "SoCo") of south central Austin, within walking distance of St. Edward's University.

== History ==
Five of the ten World War II veterans that established KVET on October 13, 1946; pictured in this group are general manager John Connally—a future Texas governor—and sales manager Jake Pickle, a future United States representative.

=== Austin's third radio station ===
With the end of World War II, a group of ten Texas veterans organized as the Austin Broadcasting Company and pooled their resources to start a radio station in Austin. After obtaining a construction permit on December 13, 1945, they chose a call sign that included the word "vet". KVET first signed on the air on October 1, 1946. The ownership group included future Texas Governor John Connally and future Congressman Jake Pickle. As Austin's third radio station upon launch, KVET was a network affiliate of the Mutual Broadcasting System, and Connally served as KVET's president and general manager.

Unusual for its day, KVET also included programming for Austin's minority communities. Spanish-language news and music was heard on Noche de Fiesta. Music and news for African American listeners was heard on The Elmer Akins Gospel Train. In the 1950s, even more diversity was added to the lineup when Lavada Durst introduced Austin to R&B and "Jive Talk" on KVET's nighttime Dr. Hepcat Show. Noche de Fiesta and Dr. Hepcat were phased out in the 1960s, but the Gospel Train was on the air on KVET for many years after.

Connally sold his stake in the station to manager Willard Deason, among the founders of KVET, in 1955.

=== The "Country Giant" ===
During most of the 1960s, KVET featured a full service middle of the road music format, with a strong emphasis on news and sports programming. The music of Frank Sinatra, Perry Como, Nat King Cole and Barbra Streisand, plus Paul Harvey commentary, the Joe Pyne show, and Houston Astros baseball were all part of the mix. In the middle of this time period, the FCC approved two major changes within 10 days of each other: a power increase to 5,000 watts and the sale of the station to the KVET Broadcasting Company, headed by Austin businessman Roy Butler, for $5,000. The sale came as the company was planning two large expansions. It had filed to build an FM radio station, and by the time of the Butler sale, the company held the construction permit for a television station on channel 24, which it had held since 1963 but had not put on the air. The former came on the air March 30, 1969, as KASE-FM. The television station permit would be sold to McAlister Television Enterprises and then to a group in which former governor Allan Shivers was a member, and put on the air in 1971 as KVUE.

KVET switched formats on April 14, 1969, to country music, and the "Country Giant" was born. "Noche de Fiesta" moved from KVET to sister station KASE-FM, airing in the morning from 5:30am-8am. Popular celebrity DJs Arleigh Duff, Penny Reeves, Jerry Gee and Sammy Allred took KVET to the top of the local ratings during the 1970s. In the 1980s, KVET aired country music, news and sports, including Houston Oilers and Dallas Cowboys football, but its ratings continued to slide as listeners moved to FM.

=== From talk to sports ===
In September 1990, KVET began a simulcast on 98.1 FM, which had previously been the home of Top 40 KHFI-FM, which moved to 96.7; the arrangement was part of a then-rare local marketing agreement between the new owner of the 98.1 frequency, Spur Capital, and KVET. The music mix was differentiated from KASE, which had become a country music station itself, by being more traditional than its stablemate. The Sammy Allred and Bob Cole Morning Call-In Show began at the same time.

In 1995, after the FCC legalized broadcast duopolies, Butler purchased KVET-FM outright. By that time, the AM was already being split off from the now-successful FM, slowly shifting to talk radio programming over the course of 1993 and 1994. KVET was an ABC Information Network affiliate and also aired syndicated talk shows. By late 1994, the shift was complete with KVET and KVET-FM only simulcasting the morning show hosted by Sammy Allred and Bob Cole, but the talk station garnered poor ratings.

At the end of 1997, Capstar Broadcasting—which would later merge into Clear Channel Communications, a forerunner of current owner iHeartMedia—purchased KVET, KVET-FM and KASE for $90 million. Not included in the sale was the transmitter site for KVET, which to this day remains under Butler ownership; 2020 records assessed the land as being valued at $1,600,335. Owing to the dominance of KLBJ in the news/talk format in Austin, plus the station's existing coverage of Texas Longhorns sports, Capstar opted to take the AM station in a new direction in October 1998. It fired a dozen staffers in its new acquisition and several hosts and switched KVET to a sports format.

Industry trade website RadioInsight had initially reported on May 5, 2021, that iHeartMedia surrendered KVET's license; a brief public notice at the FCC stated "License cancelled at licensee's request by email from counsel on May 4, 2021" and the posting hinted at a possibility Butler was selling the transmitter site. This news came several weeks after KASE-HD2—with an FM translator at 97.5 FM—was awarded flagship rights to Austin FC and several months after the station's lone locally-based talk show was cancelled following a mass downsizing effort by iHeartMedia. However, this cancellation notice was revealed the following day to be "an inadvertent typo by the FCC" confusing KVET with KEVT in Sahuarita, Arizona, which had surrendered its license; KVET's license was subsequently restored.

KVET AM previously simulcast on KVET-HD2, the HD digital subchannel of KVET-FM, and on FM translator K276EL (103.1 FM) until August 27, 2021, when KVET-HD2 and K276EL flipped to an '80s hits format.

== Programming ==
KVET's programming as a sports talk station largely consists of national fare from Fox Sports Radio. Morning and afternoon shows are carried in conjunction with KTKR, the iHeartMedia sports talk station in San Antonio; the station is also the local affiliate for the John Clay Wolfe Show.

Play-by-play rights include the radio networks of the Houston Texans and San Antonio Spurs. In 2023, University of Texas athletics returned to the iHeartMedia stations, with KVET AM as the flagship station and KVET-FM simulcasting football and men's basketball, after previously airing on KTXX-FM 104.9.
