= KZEY (690 AM) =

- Tyler, Texas; United States
- Frequency: 690 kHz

Programming
- Format: Urban adult contemporary
- Affiliations: ABC Radio Networks

Ownership
- Owner: Community Broadcast Group, Inc.

History
- First air date: January 1, 1958
- Last air date: January 2007

Technical information
- Facility ID: 12809
- Class: D
- Power: 1,000 watts (day); 92 watts (night)
- Transmitter coordinates: 32°22′52″N 95°20′52″W

KZEY (690 AM) was an American radio station licensed to serve Tyler, Texas, United States. The station, established in 1958, was owned by Community Broadcast Group, Inc.

When the station fell silent in January 2007, KZEY had been broadcasting an urban adult contemporary music format to the greater Tyler-Longview, Texas metropolitan area.

== History ==
In 2005, the station encountered financial and technical difficulties resulting in the station's license being temporarily pulled and the KZEY call sign deleted from the database maintained by the Federal Communications Commission (FCC) on October 19, 2005. Four months after the station was deleted from the database, the station was re-licensed and reassigned the KZEY call sign by the FCC on February 2, 2006.

In June 2006, the station's owner suffered a stroke and the station went off the air for good in January 2007. In a February 2011 letter to the FCC, the owner indicated that he was surrendering the station's broadcast license as well as the licenses for ten sister stations in similar dire circumstances. On May 2, 2011, the station's license was cancelled and the KZEY call sign assignment was deleted permanently from the FCC database.
