= KGAS-FM =

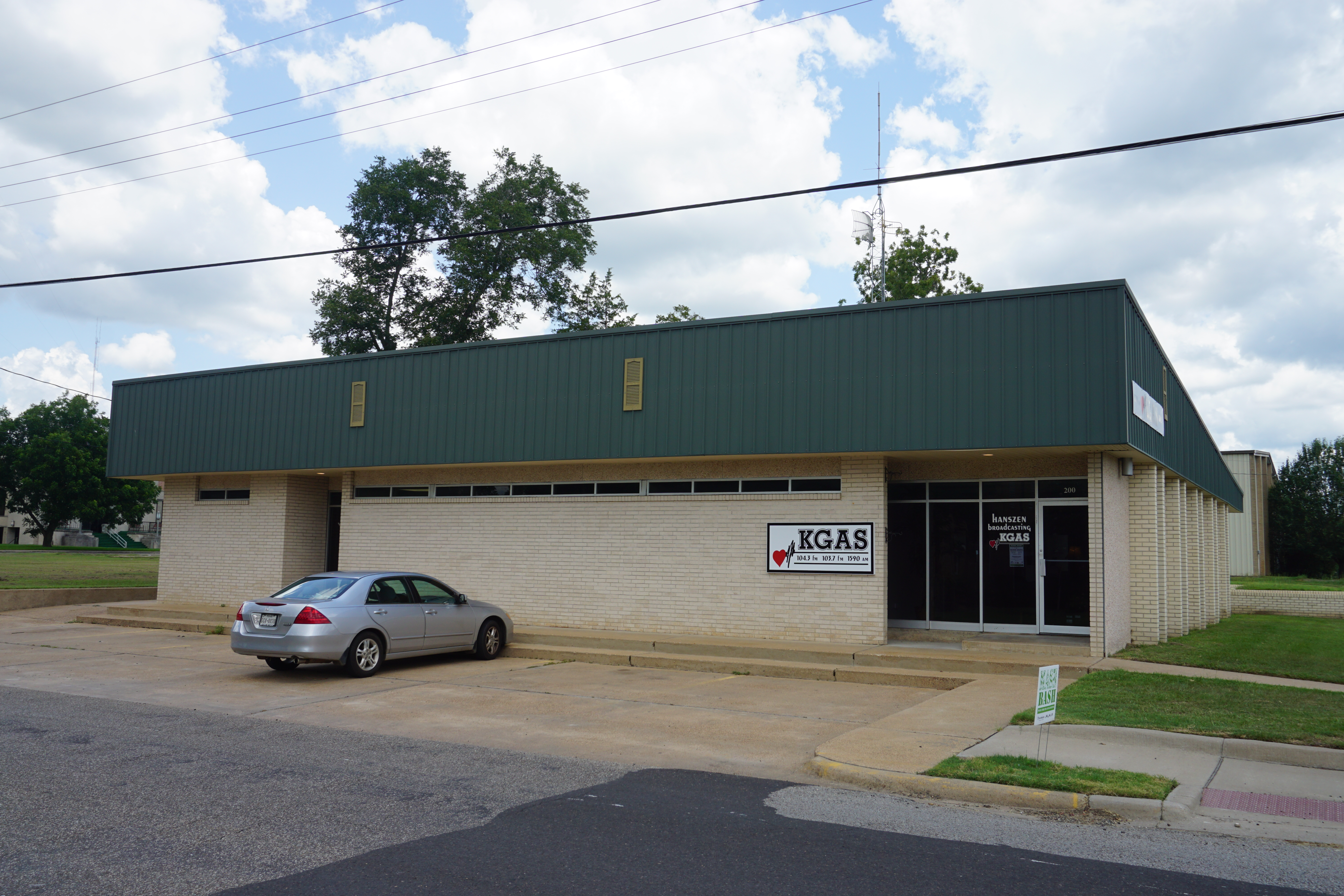
- KGAS Studios
- Carthage, Texas, U.S.; United States
- Broadcast area: East Texas
- Frequency: 104.3 MHz
- Branding: KGAS Radio

Programming
- Format: Country
- Affiliations: Dallas Cowboys

Ownership
- Owner: Wanda J. Hanszen and Jerry T. Hanszen; (Hanszen Broadcasting, Inc.)
- Sister stations: KGAS, KMHT, KMHT-FM

History
- First air date: September 16, 1998
- Call sign meaning: natural gas (the area historically has produced oil and gas)

Technical information
- Licensing authority: FCC
- Facility ID: 25990
- Class: A
- ERP: 6,000 watts
- HAAT: 100 meters
- Transmitter coordinates: 32°08′33″N 94°25′39″W

Links
- Public license information: Public file; LMS
- Website: www.easttexastoday.com

KGAS-FM (104.3 FM "KGAS Radio") is a radio station that broadcasts a country music format. Licensed to Carthage, Texas, United States, the station serves the East Texas area.

== History ==
KGAS-FM first began broadcasting in 1991, having received an initial permit to construct a Class A FM facility on July 9, 1991. The station is currently owned by Wanda Hanszen and Jerry Hanszen, through licensee Hanszen Broadcasting, Inc.

Local broadcasts include live remotes from community events, high school sports broadcasts, church programs, and local news. Local news broadcasts can be heard on weekdays at 6, 7, and 8 a.m., along with a noon broadcast. The station also has an evening news broadcast at 5 p.m. On Saturday's, from 9am-noon, KGAS broadcasts Front Porch Saturday with Skip Roten. The station was originally an affiliate of "Today's Best Country" from ABC and Cumulus, but in 2014 switched to Westwood One's "Classic Country" format.

Every Sunday from 6 a.m. to noon, KGAS-FM broadcasts gospel music and live church programming.

KGAS-FM was featured in the Richard Linklater movie Bernie, which was released in 2011.

== Current and former staff ==
On-Air Hosts: Morning and Noon news (along with "The World-Famous Swap Shop") - Mark Bownds, 5pm News - Ken Carroll, Evening DJ (and host of Front Porch Saturday and Sunday Nights With Skip) - Skip Roten

Office Manager - Kelly Cook, Assistant Office Manager - Brailey Bishop, and Sales Manager - Judy McNatt

Former on-air personalities include: Blake Holland, Elaine Etheridge, Ashli Dansby, Daron McDaniel, Steven Kaine Williams, Reid Kerr, Trevor Bullard, David Jacobs, Eric Jenkins, Alan Mayton and Mark McLain.
