= KPEZ =

Radio station in Austin, Texas

- Austin, Texas; United States
- Broadcast area: Greater Austin
- Frequency: 102.3 MHz (HD Radio)
- Branding: 102.3 The Beat

Programming
- Format: Rhythmic contemporary
- Subchannels: HD2: "TikTok Radio"; HD3: Pride Radio
- Affiliations: iHeartRadio; Compass Media Networks; Premiere Networks

Ownership
- Owner: iHeartMedia; (iHM Licenses, LLC)
- Sister stations: KASE-FM; KHFI-FM; KVET; KVET-FM

History
- First air date: August 14, 1976
- Former call signs: KMXX (1976–1982)
- Call sign meaning: Reference to a prior easy listening format

Technical information
- Licensing authority: FCC
- Facility ID: 11935
- Class: C2
- ERP: 26,000 watts
- HAAT: 209 meters (686 ft)
- Transmitter coordinates: 30.224°N 97.828°W

Links
- Public license information: Public file; LMS
- Webcast: Listen live (via iHeartRadio); Listen live (HD2)
- Website: thebeatatx.iheart.com

KPEZ (102.3 FM "102.3 The Beat") is a commercial radio station in Austin, Texas. It is owned by iHeartMedia and airs a rhythmic contemporary radio format. It shares studios with four other iHeart stations in the Penn Field complex in the South Congress district (or "SoCo") of south central Austin, near St. Edward's University. KPEZ has an effective radiated power of 26,000 watts, broadcasting from a transmitter site off Brodie Lane in Sunset Valley, Texas.

"The Beat" station brand has for many years been associated with the R&B and hip hop music genres in the Austin radio market. It originated on 104.3 in 1998, first as KQBT, and later KXBT (now KLQB). It later moved to 104.9 (now KTXX) before that station switched formats in 2008. Clear Channel Communications picked up the branding one year later and placed it on 105.9 KFMK before swapping formats with KPEZ in 2010.

== History ==
=== Regional Mexican: 1976-1977 ===
On August 14, 1976, the 102.3 frequency first signed on as KMXX. It was owned by Dynamic Communications of Austin and played Regional Mexican music. KMXX was Austin's first full-time Spanish language radio station on the FM dial. The president and general manager was Roberto C. Villanueva, making it a rare FM station in a large market under the control of Hispanic management.

=== Urban contemporary: 1977-1982 ===
KMXX's Spanish-language format lasted only about a year before the station switched to urban contemporary music. With less than 1,000 watts ERP, KMXX had a hard time competing with other stations in Austin, some of them running up to 100,000 watts ERP.

=== Easy listening: 1982-1989 ===
In 1982, the station was bought by San Antonio-based Clear Channel Communications, the forerunner to present day owner iHeartMedia. The call sign was changed to KPEZ and the format switched to easy listening music as "EZ 102". In the 1980s, power was increased to 3,000 watts, but the signal was still weak in parts of Austin and its suburbs.

=== Classic rock: 1989-2004 ===
In the late 1980s, KPEZ switched formats to classic rock, becoming "Z 102." In 1989, it increased power to 26,000 watts from a new tower off Brodie Lane in Southwest Austin, providing better coverage of the city and its suburbs.

=== AAA: 2004-2005 ===
In the fall of 2004, KPEZ became "Channel 102-3" airing a classic-leaning adult album alternative (AAA) format, dubbed "World Class Rock." The station was based on sister stations KBCO and KTCZ-FM.

=== Contemporary Christian: 2005-2010 ===
On December 16, 2005, the AAA format was dropped, and after stunting with Christmas music, KPEZ flipped to a Christian Contemporary music format as "102.3 The River."

=== Rhythmic contemporary: 2010-present ===
In 1998, Clear Channel launched 105.9 KFMK, a new station licensed to Round Rock, Texas. In 2010, as Clear Channel was going into private ownership, FCC ownership regulations required that the Austin cluster spin off one of its stations. There were plans underway to move KFMK into the Aloha Trust LLC for a future sale. On May 21, 2010, Clear Channel announced that it would move KFMK's rhythmic contemporary format to the 102.3 frequency, taking advantage of its more powerful signal. The switch took place on May 31, 2010. The Christian Contemporary format, heard on the 102.3 frequency, moved to 105.9. KFMK was later purchased by Crista Ministries, which specializes in contemporary Christian radio stations. KFMK became Contemporary Christian "Spirit 105.9" in April 2010.

=== KPEZ HD2 ===
Until 2018, KPEZ's HD2 channel carried continuous rebroadcasts of American Top 40 countdown shows from the era when Casey Kasem was the host. The HD2 subchannel currently carries iHeart's Pride Radio, a mix of pop and dance music and EDM, aimed at Austin's gay community.

== Personalities ==
Current:

- Frankie V. (Afternoons)
- Tino Cochino (Nights)
- Mikey V (Weekends)
