= KOKE-FM =

Radio station in Austin, Texas

Coordinates: 30.490°N 97.299°W

- Thorndale, Texas; United States
- Broadcast area: Austin, Texas
- Frequency: 99.3 MHz
- Branding: Mexicanísima 99.3

Programming
- Format: Regional Mexican

Ownership
- Owner: Norsan Media; (Norsan Media Group, L.P.)
- Sister stations: KTAE; KTXX-FM; KNMF

History
- First air date: September 30, 2005 (as KLGO)
- Former call signs: KLGO (2005–2012)
- Call sign meaning: Coke

Technical information
- Licensing authority: FCC
- Facility ID: 88370
- Class: C3
- ERP: 24,000 watts
- HAAT: 100 meters (328 ft)

Links
- Public license information: Public file; LMS

KOKE-FM (99.3 MHz) is a commercial radio station broadcasting a Regional Mexican radio format. Licensed to Thorndale, Texas, KOKE-FM serves the Greater Austin radio market. The station is owned by Norsan Media. The transmitter site is located on County Road 470 in Coupland, Texas. The studios and offices are along Loop 360 in Southwest Austin.

== History ==
=== The Original 95.5 KOKE-FM ===
From a Texas Monthly cover story (April 2012):

"In the summer of 1972, Willie Nelson moved into Austin, just 6 months after KOKE-FM switched to its new format called Country Rock or the more politically correct term at the time "progressive country." Country Radio would never be the same. From the Carter Family to the Rolling Stones, to Waylon and Willie, you could hear the music that Austinites were listening to on I-35 and on South Congress. In 1974 Billboard named KOKE-FM the most innovative station in the country."

KOKE-FM played a role in promoting the careers of several country musicians associated with the outlaw country movement, including Waylon Jennings and Willie Nelson. Under program director Joe Gracey, the station helped promote singer-songwriters associated with the movement. When Jerry Jeff Walker needed an audience to record "Up Against the Wall, Redneck Mother", he contacted KOKE-FM to help gather a crowd.

One of the characteristics of a regional music business was that the players, operating out of the glare of the big media centers, often made their own rules. "Redneck Rock" was created by KOKE-FM where the "outlaws" played by their own rules. No one realized that what had started in that little studio on North Lamar would have such a profound effect on country music all across the world.

Joe Garcia has been the vanguard and proprietor of the KOKE call letters at its home in Giddings, Texas at AM 1600. Joe’s Hall Of Fame broadcasting lineage includes his father, Jose (Jaime) Garcia, who blazed the trail and set the standard for Hispanic and Tejano broadcasting in Texas.

=== "Austin's on Track, 'Cause KOKE-FM is Back" ===
On June 28, 2012, KLGO moved "The Word" to KFON 1490 AM. Subsequently, 99.3 changed call letters to KOKE-FM and began stunting with a live recording of Dale Watson's "Country My Ass" played in a continuous loop, calculated on-air as being played 1,694 times, the most times a radio station has looped a song as a stunt since 1995. This example of stunting is notable for the station-specific nature of the song's lyrics. Watson re-recorded the song for the occasion, adding a new coda in which he sings, "Now Austin's on track, 'cause KOKE-FM's back."

On July 8, 2012, the progressive country format pioneered in 1972 by the original KOKE-FM (now KKMJ-FM 95.5) was resurrected on 99.3 FM and K253AN (98.5 FM).

On April 19, 2014, translator K287FG (105.3 FM) dropped its simulcast of KOKE-FM and became "105.3 The Fringe", a freeform Triple-A station.

=== Norsan Media ownership ===
On April 19, 2024, Norsan Media announced a deal to buy out Genuine Austin Radio. On May 17 of that year, an early morning info spot ran indicating KOKE-FM would move to exclusively stream online on June 1, 2024, later confirmed via an online announcement on the 30th.

On June 1, 2024, KOKE-FM changed their format from progressive country to Regional Mexican, branded as "Mexicanísima 99.3".
