= KZNX =

Radio station in Creedmoor, Texas

- The KZNX towers in Bastrop County, Texas.
- Creedmoor, Texas; United States
- Broadcast area: Austin-Round Rock metropolitan area
- Frequency: 1530 kHz
- Branding: La Raza 95.1 y 104.9

Programming
- Language: Spanish
- Format: Regional Mexican

Ownership
- Owner: America Telecommunications Group, Inc.

History
- First air date: December 8, 1962; 63 years ago
- Former call signs: KGTN (1962–1991); KOPY (1991–1994); KWTR (1994–1997); KNEZ (1997–1998); KQQA (1998–2004)

Technical information
- Licensing authority: FCC
- Facility ID: 38906
- Class: D
- Power: 10,000 watts (day); 1,000 watts (critical hours); 220 watts (night)
- Transmitter coordinates: 30°4′39″N 97°38′9″W; (day and critical hours); 30°20′45″N 97°38′5″W (night)
- Translator: 95.1 K236AY (West Lake Hills)
- Repeater: 104.9 KTXX-FM (Bee Cave)

Links
- Public license information: Public file; LMS
- Webcast: Listen live
- Website: larazalaraza.com/austin/

KZNX (1530 AM) is a radio station licensed to Creedmoor, Texas. It airs a Spanish regional Mexican radio format, simulcast on two FM frequencies. The station's transmitter is off Dale Overton Road in the Thoroughbred Estates neighborhood of Del Valle, Texas.

KZNX is also heard on FM translator K236AY at 95.1 MHz in West Lake Hills, Texas, and on KTXX-FM at 104.9 MHz. KZNX 1530 AM and translator station K236AY 95.1 FM are currently being operated and managed by La Palabra Radio. KZNX is powered at 10,000 watts by day. Since AM 1530 is a clear channel frequency reserved for Class A WCKY in Cincinnati and KFBK in Sacramento, KZNX must significantly reduce power during critical hours and at night.

== History ==
The station first signed on the air on December 8, 1962, with the call sign KGTN. Its original city of license was Georgetown, Texas, and it was owned by the Georgetown Broadcasting Company. It began as a 1,000 watt daytimer, required to go off the air at night.

In 1991, KGTN became KOPY with a Christian format, owned by state representative Dan Kubiak. Two years later, the Lower Colorado River Authority acquired KOPY; the public utility's acquisition of the radio station, which had previously gone silent, came in the wake of 1991 floods in the region that required more timely dissemination of information than the region's weekly newspapers and coverage-limited radio stations could provide. Under LCRA's ownership, 1530 returned to the air in March 1995 as KWTR, running automated weather and river information and later including additional community information.

Public response to KWTR was "fairly good", but the river authority ultimately decided that working with the National Weather Service was more cost-effective, and in April 1997, KWTR gave way to "K-News", an all-news radio station owned by Yellow Rose Communications alongside 92.1 KIKY (now KYLR) LCRA sold the station for $632,000; a new KNEZ call sign was instituted in April 1997.

KNEZ did not last long; in 1998, the station became KQQA, a simulcast of KQQQ (the former KIKY). The two stations aired a Regional Mexican format known as La Nueva. Yellow Rose sold KQQA in 2004 to Simmons Media Group, which flipped the frequency to sports as KZNX. Border Media Partners bought the station in 2010 and sold it two years later to America Telecommunications Group, a company 25 percent owned by José Pérez Ramírez of Mexican station group Promomedios.

Norsan Media began operating KTXX-FM as a simulcast of KZNX on August 2, 2023, when the company announced that it was purchasing the station from Genuine Austin Radio. The simulcast gives KZNX a full-powered FM signal within the Austin market.

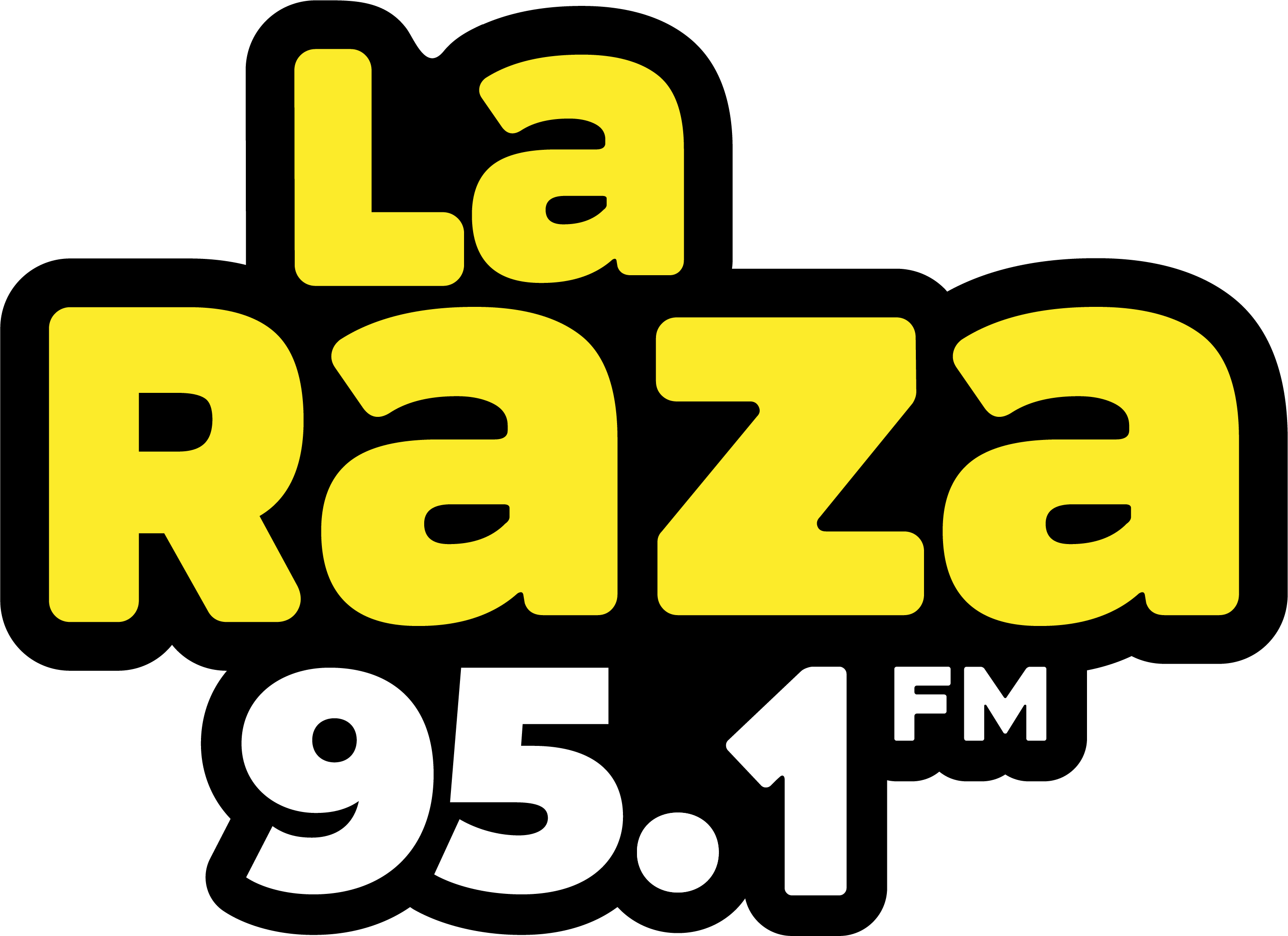
Logo before simulcasting with 104.9

== Translators ==
Broadcast translator for KZNX
Call sign	Frequency	City of license	FID	ERP (W)	HAAT	Class	Transmitter coordinates	FCC info
K236AY	95.1 FM	West Lake Hills, Texas	139268	99	333.7 m (1,095 ft)	D	30°19′24″N 97°47′59″W	LMS
