= KFYN-FM =

Radio station in Detroit, Texas

Coordinates: 33.7573°N 95.5378°W

- Detroit, Texas; United States
- Broadcast area: Paris, Texas; Hugo, Oklahoma
- Frequency: 104.3 MHz
- Branding: 104-3 The River

Programming
- Format: Country; red dirt

Ownership
- Owner: Vision Media Group, Inc.
- Sister stations: KLOW

History
- First air date: July 2013

Technical information
- Licensing authority: FCC
- Facility ID: 183373
- Class: C2
- ERP: 50,000 watts
- HAAT: 139.7 meters (458 ft)

Links
- Public license information: Public file; LMS
- Website: 1043theriver.com

KFYN-FM (104.3 FM) is a radio station licensed to Detroit, Texas, and serving Paris, Texas, and Hugo, Oklahoma. The station broadcasts a country and red dirt music format. KFYN is owned by Vision Media Group, Inc.
