= KVET-FM =

Radio station in Austin, Texas

- Austin, Texas; United States
- Broadcast area: Greater Austin
- Frequency: 98.1 MHz (HD Radio)
- Branding: 98.1 K-VET

Programming
- Format: Country

Ownership
- Owner: iHeartMedia; (iHM Licenses, LLC)
- Sister stations: KASE-FM; KHFI-FM; KPEZ; KVET

History
- First air date: March 25, 1956
- Former call signs: KHFI-FM (1956–1990)
- Former frequencies: 98.3 MHz (1956–1990)
- Call sign meaning: Taken from KVET

Technical information
- Licensing authority: FCC
- Facility ID: 62048
- Class: C1
- ERP: 49,800 watts
- HAAT: 397 meters (1,302 ft)
- Transmitter coordinates: 30.323°N 97.800°W

Links
- Public license information: Public file; LMS
- Webcast: Listen live (via iHeartRadio)
- Website: 981kvet.iheart.com

KVET-FM (98.1 MHz, "98.1 K-VET") is a commercial FM radio station licensed to Austin, Texas. It is owned by iHeartMedia and airs a gold-based country music radio format. KVET-FM shares studios and offices with other iHeart sister stations in the Penn Field complex in Austin's South Congress district (or "SoCo") near St. Edward's University. The transmitter is off Buckman Mountain Road in Austin, amid the towers of other local FM and TV stations.

KVET-FM is one of two country stations iHeart owns in the market, with KASE-FM playing mostly current and recent country hits, while KVET-FM mixes some 1980s, 1990s and early 2000s titles among current and recent country songs.

== History ==
=== Early years ===
James E. Moore, Jr., applied for a construction permit to build an FM radio station on 98.3 MHz in Austin on November 4, 1955. The Federal Communications Commission (FCC) granted it 26 days later. KHFI, the first FM station in Austin, went on the air on March 25, 1956, airing a classical music format. The station originally broadcast with an effective radiated power (ERP) of just 700 watts.

A year after building KHFI, Moore sold it to Roderick E. Kennedy, who had been serving as the manager. After changing the corporate name to Kennedy-Heard Features Inc. in 1960, Kennedy sold KHFI to the Southwest Republic Corporation in 1964. Southwest Republic, which Kennedy joined as vice president, then bought separately owned KASE (970 AM) and renamed that station as KHFI (AM) that November. Furthermore, the company was in the middle of constructing Austin's second television station, KHFI-TV.

With the AM relaunched and the television station on the air, Southwest Republic relaunched KHFI-FM in November 1965. The station shed its classical format, shifted to more of an adult contemporary sound, and began FM stereo broadcasts. A year later, KHFI-FM donated its classical music library to help start Austin's new noncommercial KMFA-FM. Southwest Republic, owned by John Kingsbery, merged alongside concrete producer Featherlite Corporation into Kingstip, Inc., in 1971.

=== K-98 ===
In the mid-1970s, KHFI-FM switched to an album oriented rock format, the latest in a string of musical formats attempted at the station. It didn't work and fell far behind rock rival KLBJ-FM in the ratings. In early 1979, the format was jettisoned, and KHFI-FM became "Disco 98", capitalizing on the success of Saturday Night Fever and WKTU in New York City. It was KHFI-FM's third format flip in a year.

At the same time, KHFI-FM and its co-owned television station, then known as KTVV and now as KXAN on channel 36, were sold to LIN Broadcasting. LIN, however, had been required to divest one of the two properties within twelve months; it chose to retain the TV station. Central Texas Broadcasting, a group headed by Dick Oppenheimer, acquired KHFI-FM in 1980. Oppenheimer's acquisition reunited KHFI-FM, now having shifted to Top 40 as "K-98", with the former KHFI (AM), now religious KIXL, generating concerns that a format change was in the air. The format never changed, and KHFI-FM established itself as a ratings leader in Austin during the first half of the 1980s, dueling with KASE-FM for the number one position.

=== Signal upgrade ===
In 1986, Oppenheimer reached a deal to sell KHFI and KIXL, along with the remaining properties he owned, to Florida broadcaster George Duncan's Encore Communications in a $38 million transaction; $20 million of that was derived from the Austin duo, which set a market sale price record. The timing could not have been worse for Duncan. That same year, a far more powerful station, KBTS, moved into the Austin market from Killeen. With 100,000 watts of signal power to KHFI-FM's 1,300 watts, the station could not adequately compete.

This prompted KHFI-FM to pursue a frequency change to 98.1 MHz and upgrade to 100,000 watts, which took place in April 1990. The move-in of KBTS and other FM stations to the Austin market from surrounding areas, a decline in radio revenue and general declines in the value of radio properties meant that the next sale of KHFI-FM would set its own record. It was purchased for $5 million by Spur Capital, an Austin investment firm managed by Don Kuykendall, in 1990. Industry publications heralded the transaction as representing the largest loss in the history of commercial radio in the United States; KHFI-FM had sold for one-fourth what it was worth in 1986.

=== KHFI-FM to KVET-FM ===
Before the Spur Capital purchase was announced, two rumors were flying at KHFI-FM: that the station had been sold for a shockingly low $5 million and that it would flip to a country music format. For eight hours on April Fools' Day, the station stunted as a new country outlet. It was branded as "The Rooster", which station morning host Kevin Connor called "a salute to the people forecasting our demise".

At the same time as Spur purchased KHFI-FM, two other events were occurring in Austin radio. Butler Broadcasting, the owner of country KVET (1300 AM), was seeking a place to move that station's format to the FM band. But Butler already owned KASE-FM, the city's dominant country station. Because of market ownership rules at the time, the company could not own another FM frequency. Meanwhile, at 96.7 MHz, oldies station KQFX was being sold. Both were instrumental in what happened next. In the second ever local marketing agreement (LMA) in radio—the first having been drawn up by Kuykendall in Jackson, Mississippi—Spur leased the FM's air time to KVET. With that move, KVET began simulcasting on FM. Meanwhile, Joyner Communications, the new owner of KQFX, fired its airstaff and took on the entire KHFI-FM intellectual unit and Top 40 format.

=== Running two country stations ===
KVET believed that Austin could support two country music stations, citing the example of other Texas markets. The music mix was differentiated: KASE was more contemporary while KVET-FM was more traditional than its stablemate.

Coinciding with the beginning of the FM simulcast, that station's existing morning show was blown up and a new team of Sammy Allred and Bob Cole was instituted. It turned out to be a profitable bet. By 1994, KVET-FM was the fifth-rated station in town. The AM station, in turn, was shifting to a talk radio format. By late 1994, the morning show was the only offering simulcast on both frequencies. In 1995, after the FCC legalized broadcast duopolies, Butler purchased KVET-FM outright for $5 million.

=== Capstar acquisition ===
At the end of 1997, Capstar Broadcasting purchased KVET, KVET-FM and KASE for $90 million. Capstar would later merge into San Antonio-based Clear Channel Communications, the forerunner to current owner iHeartMedia, Inc.

In May 2007, morning show host Sammy Allred was suspended after calling presidential candidate Barack Obama a "clean darky", in response to Sen. Joseph Biden's comments about Obama. He was fired on October 30, 2007, for apparently swearing on-air, calling a listener an "a-hole." Allred's firing came just three days after afternoon host Janice Williams was terminated for budgetary reasons.

On July 13, 2023, it was announced that KVET-FM would become the FM flagship station for the Texas Longhorns, as part of a deal made between the university and owner iHeartMedia.

== HD Radio ==
Initially, the 103.1 K276EL translator station broadcast the "Air1" Contemporary Christian music network from the Educational Media Foundation, which owned the translator and needed an originating HD Radio subchannel to feed the format. When Clear Channel began leasing the translator, Air1 was dropped in favor of a simulcast of co-owned sports station KVET. The simulcast lasted until 3 p.m. on May 8, 2012, when a rhythmic adult contemporary format was launched as "Jammin' 103.1."

On March 7, 2013, at 3 p.m., after playing "Bizarre Love Triangle" by New Order, KVET-HD2 and K276EL flipped to "iHeart Austin", which was intended as a temporary "pop-up format" dedicated to the South by Southwest festivals. The translator station aired coverage of the festival and featured music by artists playing there. The playlist consisted of a diverse mix of newer and past favorites of alternative rock, indie rock, punk rock and new wave, as well as some hip-hop and EDM tracks. It was originally intended to run through the end of the festival on March 17, with the "Jammin'" format returning to the frequency, but Clear Channel management decided to continue the format after the end of SXSW.

After the festival, the subchannel began airing Premium Choice's "Alt Project" feed (except during subsequent festivals, when local programming returned). On May 23, 2017, at 10 a.m., after playing "Fell on Black Days" by Soundgarden, KVET-HD2/K276EL switched to a Spanish CHR format, branded as "Tú 103.1"; The first song on "Tú" was "Despacito" by Luis Fonsi and Daddy Yankee. This format was dropped on August 26, 2019, and the KVET (AM) simulcast restored.

On August 27, 2021, at 4 p.m., almost exactly two years to the day after restoring the KVET simulcast, the station and the HD2 signal dropped the simulcast once again, this time flipping to a 1980s hits format as "103.1, Austin's 80s Station". With the flip, the station would also bring longtime Austin morning personality Sandy McIlree’s syndicated “The Sandy Show”, hosted by McIlree and his wife Tricia, to the market. McIlree is best known for his long run co-hosting mornings at KAMX with JB Hager from 1995 to 2013. In 2024, the broadcast of 103.1 K276EL moved to the HD2 sub-channel of sister station KHFI-FM.
