= KMHT (AM) =

KMHT and KMHT-FM

Marshall, Texas; United States
- Broadcast area: Longview-Marshall area
- Frequencies: KMHT: 1450 kHz; KMHT-FM: 103.9 MHz
- Branding: KMHT: ESPN Radio 1450; KMHT-FM: 103.9 Classic Country

Programming
- Format: KMHT: Sports; KMHT-FM: Classic Country
- Affiliations: KMHT: ESPN Radio

Ownership
- Owner: Hanszen Broadcast Group, Inc.
- Sister stations: KGAS, KGAS-FM

History
- First air date: KMHT: March 23, 1947; KMHT-FM: September 26, 1977
- Former call signs: KMHT-FM: KZEY-FM (1994–2003)

Technical information
- Licensing authority: FCC
- Facility ID: KMHT: 72450; KMHT-FM: 72451
- Class: KMHT: C; KMHT-FM: A
- Power: KMHT: 650 watts
- ERP: KMHT-FM: 1,850 watts
- HAAT: KMHT-FM: 129 meters (423 ft)
- Transmitter coordinates: KMHT: 32°33′50″N 94°21′4″W
- Translator(s): KMHT: See § Translator

Links
- Public license information: KMHT: Public file; LMS; KMHT-FM: Public file; LMS
- Website: easttexastoday.com

KMHT (1450 AM) and KMHT-FM (103.9 FM) are commercial radio stations licensed to Marshall, Texas, United States, both owned by Hanszen Broadcast Group, Inc. and serving the Longview-Marshall area. KMHT carries a sports format with ESPN Radio programming, while KMHT-FM carries a classic country format. KMHT is supplemented with an FM translator also licensed to Marshall.

The stations also broadcasts Marshall High School athletics as well as TSN (Texas State Network), Texas Rangers, Houston Astros, Dallas Cowboys, Houston Texans, Dallas Mavericks, the University of Texas Longhorn Athletics, and Texas A&M athletics. Other area high school athletics that KMHT covers include Harleton, Elysian Fields, and Waskom.

== History ==
A group of local veterans returned to Marshall from World War II and took advantage of their right to first preferences of frequencies after the radio frequency freeze was lifted at the end of the war. KHMT began broadcasting on March 23, 1947, as a Mutual and TSN affiliate. In 1961, after 14 years of operation, KMHT AM was granted FCC permission to raise the daytime power from 250 watts to 1,000 watts. Shortly thereafter, the FCC approved the operation of 1000 Watts around the clock. A later move to a new transmitter site required lowering the power to 650 watts.

In the late 1990s, KMHT was given to Wiley College, a historically black four-year liberal arts institution affiliated with the United Methodist Church, by then owner professional boxer George Foreman.

Wiley College later sold the stations to Jerry Russell, a former member of the Tyler City Council. Russell wanted to use KMHT-FM as a repeater for his AM station, 690 KZEY (which has since gone silent), so KMHT-FM became KZEY-FM.

In August 2002, Hanszen Broadcast Group, Inc., purchased KMHT/KZEY and changed the FM back to KMHT-FM. In the fall of 2006, KMHT 1450 AM changed the format to ESPN Radio. The format includes local sports coverage as well as the network coverage. The KMHT-FM format stayed the same.

== Translator ==
Broadcast translator for KMHT
Call sign	Frequency	City of license	FID	ERP (W)	HAAT	Class	Transmitter coordinates	FCC info	Notes
K245BW	96.9 FM	Marshall, Texas	156968	205	117 m (384 ft)	D	32°33′49″N 94°21′7″W	LMS	First air date: September 26, 2014
