= Creedmoor, Texas =

- City
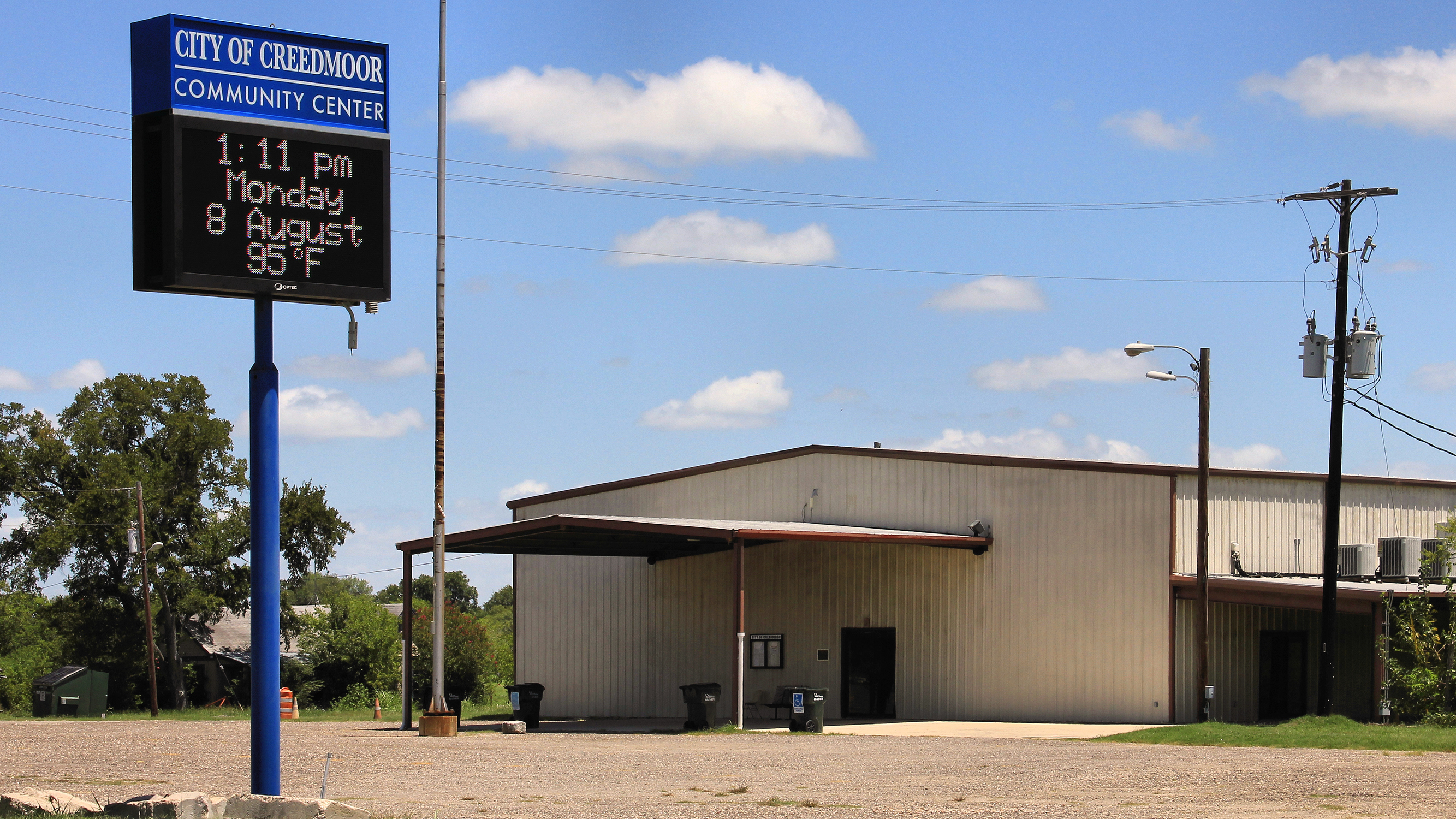
- Creedmoor Community Center

- Location of Creedmoor, Texas
- Coordinates: 30°05′22″N 97°44′41″W
- Country: United States
- State: Texas
- County: Travis
- Incorporated: 1982

Area
  - Total: 2.28 sq mi (5.91 km^{2})
  - Land: 2.28 sq mi (5.91 km^{2})
  - Water: 0 sq mi (0.00 km^{2})
- Elevation: 663 ft (202 m)

Population (2020)
  - Total: 458
  - Density: 201/sq mi (77.5/km^{2})
- Time zone: UTC-6 (Central (CST))
  - Summer (DST): UTC-5 (CDT)
- Zip Code: 78610
- FIPS code: 48-17612
- GNIS feature ID: 2410260
- Website: www.cityofcreedmoortx.gov

Creedmoor is a city in Travis County, Texas, United States. The population was 458 at the 2020 census.

== Geography ==
Creedmoor is located approximately 15 miles south of Austin.

According to the United States Census Bureau, the city has a total area of 2.1 square miles (5.4 km^{2}), all land.

== Demographics ==
Historical population
Census	Pop.	Note	%±
1990	194		—
2000	211		8.8%
2010	202		−4.3%
2020	458		126.7%
U.S. Decennial Census; 2020 Census

=== 2020 census ===
As of the 2020 census, Creedmoor had a population of 458. The median age was 40.4 years. 23.6% of residents were under the age of 18 and 15.5% of residents were 65 years of age or older. For every 100 females there were 109.1 males, and for every 100 females age 18 and over there were 98.9 males age 18 and over.

0.0% of residents lived in urban areas, while 100.0% lived in rural areas.

There were 163 households in Creedmoor, of which 47.9% had children under the age of 18 living in them. Of all households, 48.5% were married-couple households, 17.8% were households with a male householder and no spouse or partner present, and 25.8% were households with a female householder and no spouse or partner present. About 12.3% of all households were made up of individuals and 3.6% had someone living alone who was 65 years of age or older.

There were 170 housing units, of which 4.1% were vacant. The homeowner vacancy rate was 0.0% and the rental vacancy rate was 0.0%.

Racial composition as of the 2020 census
Race	Number	Percent
White	211	46.1%
Black or African American	3	0.7%
American Indian and Alaska Native	11	2.4%
Asian	6	1.3%
Native Hawaiian and Other Pacific Islander	1	0.2%
Some other race	112	24.5%
Two or more races	114	24.9%
Hispanic or Latino (of any race)	300	65.5%

=== 2000 census ===
As of the 2000 census, there were 211 people, 82 households, and 52 families residing in the city. The population density was 100.8 inhabitants per square mile (38.9/km^{2}). There were 89 housing units at an average density of 42.5 per square mile (16.4/km^{2}). The racial makeup of the city was 79.62% White, 0.95% African American, 16.59% from other races, and 2.84% from two or more races. Hispanic or Latino of any race were 47.39% of the population.

There were 82 households, out of which 29.3% had children under the age of 18 living with them, 48.8% were married couples living together, 11.0% had a female householder with no husband present, and 35.4% were non-families. 30.5% of all households were made up of individuals, and 13.4% had someone living alone who was 65 years of age or older. The average household size was 2.57 and the average family size was 3.30.

In the city, the population was spread out, with 23.2% under the age of 18, 5.7% from 18 to 24, 30.8% from 25 to 44, 25.1% from 45 to 64, and 15.2% who were 65 years of age or older. The median age was 39 years. For every 100 females, there were 93.6 males. For every 100 females age 18 and over, there were 88.4 males.

The median income for a household in the city was $39,688, and the median income for a family was $41,875. Males had a median income of $38,250 versus $28,958 for females. The per capita income for the city was $15,143. About 1.7% of families and 4.1% of the population were below the poverty line, including none of those under the age of eighteen and 17.6% of those 65 or over.

== Education ==
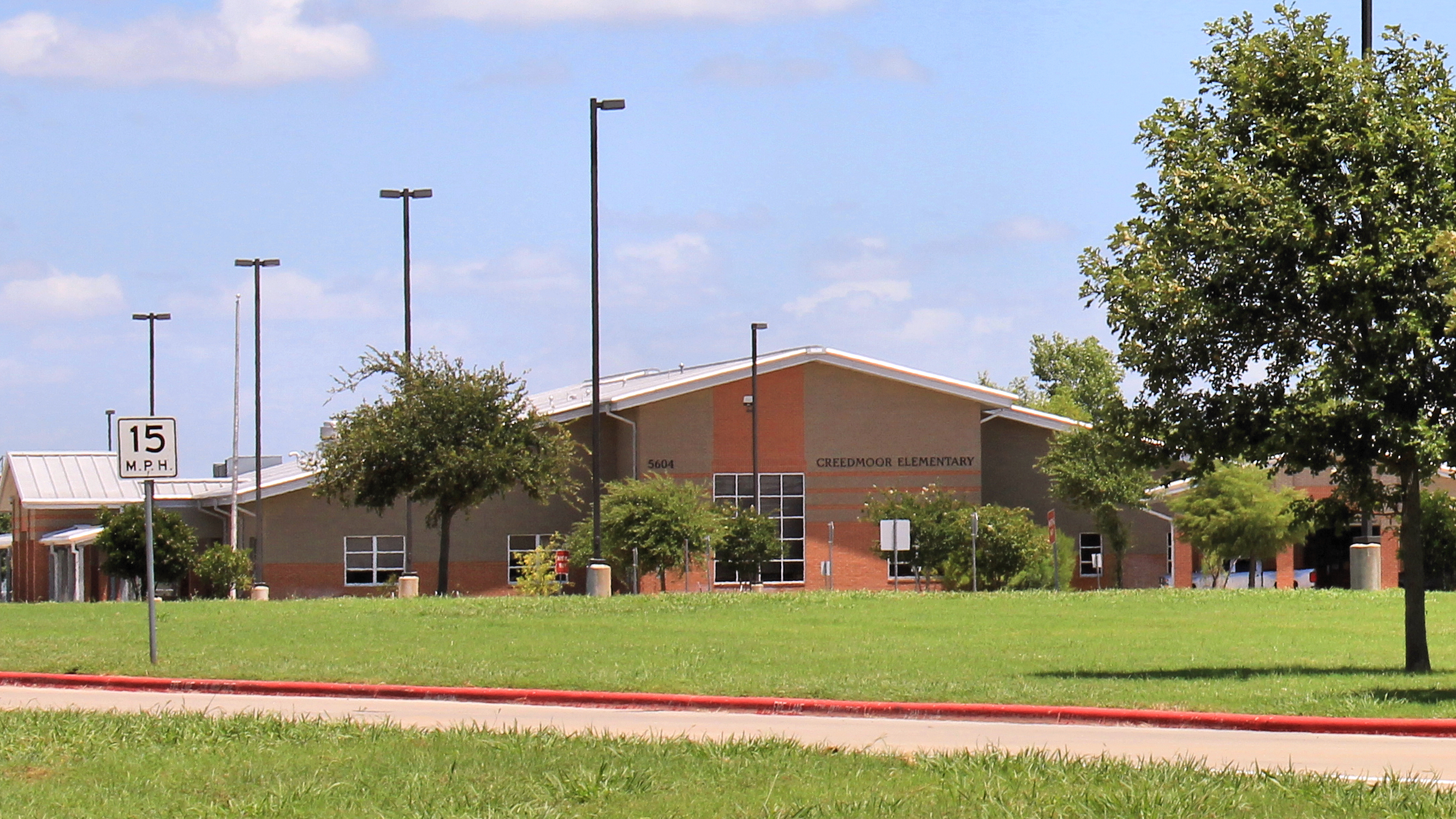
Creedmoor Elementary School

The City of Creedmoor is served by the Del Valle Independent School District. Creedmoor Elementary School is the newest elementary school in the district, and it has the largest attendance boundary of any district school. Aside from that school, Ojeda Middle School, Del Valle High School also serves the city.
