= KKSA =

San Angelo, Texas; United States
- Broadcast area: Grape Creek, Texas; Miles, Texas
- Frequency: 1260 kHz
- Branding: 1260 News Talk Sports

Programming
- Format: News/talk
- Affiliations: CNN Radio, Fox Sports Radio, Westwood One

Ownership
- Owner: Foster Communications Company

History
- Former call signs: KWFR (1954–1973); KIXY (1973–1980); KQSA (1980–1987); KAYJ (1987–1992); KXQZ (1992–1994)

Technical information
- Licensing authority: FCC
- Facility ID: 22156
- Class: D
- Power: 540 watts day 71 watts night
- Transmitter coordinates: 31°29′14″N 100°26′57″W

Links
- Public license information: Public file; LMS
- Webcast: Listen live
- Website: Official website

KKSA (1260 AM, Newstalk Sports K-Say) is a radio station broadcasting a news talk information format. It is licensed to San Angelo, Texas, United States. The station is owned by Foster Communications Company and includes programming from CNN Radio, Fox Sports Radio, and Westwood One.

== History ==
The station was assigned the call letters KAYJ on November 29, 1987. On October 5, 1992, the station changed its call sign to KXQZ, and on September 8, 1994, to the current KKSA.
