= KFLC =

Radio station in Benbrook, Texas

- Benbrook, Texas; United States
- Broadcast area: Dallas–Fort Worth metroplex
- Frequency: 1270 kHz
- Branding: 1270 AM

Programming
- Language: Spanish
- Format: Adult contemporary and regional Mexican (daytime); Sports radio (nightime)
- Affiliations: FC Dallas; Texas Rangers; TUDN Radio

Ownership
- Owner: Latino Media Network; (Latino Media Network, LLC)
- Sister stations: KFZO

History
- First air date: 1924
- Former call signs: KFQB (1924–1928); KTAT (1928–1929); KSAT (1929–1930); KTAT (1930–1939); KFJZ (1939–1984); KSSA (1984–1986); KESS (1986–1990); KSBN (1990–1991); KESS (1991–2004)

Technical information
- Licensing authority: FCC
- Facility ID: 34298
- Class: B
- Power: 50,000 watts (day); 5,000 watts (night)
- Transmitter coordinates: 32°43′36.48″N 97°11′31.05″W

Links
- Public license information: Public file; LMS

KFLC (1270 AM) is a commercial radio station licensed to Benbrook, Texas, and broadcasting to the Dallas-Fort Worth Metroplex. The station is owned and operated by Latino Media Network, with studios located in the Univision Tower at the Plaza of the Americas in the City Center District. KFLC airs a Spanish language adult contemporary radio format during the day, while also broadcasting sports radio programming as a TUDN Radio affiliate at night. KFLC also carries Spanish language play by play featuring the Texas Rangers, Dallas Mavericks, and FC Dallas.

KFLC is a Class B regional station, that uses a directional antenna at all times from its transmitter site off East Lancaster Avenue (Route 180) in Fort Worth. During the day it operates with 50,000 watts, the maximum power permitted for U.S. AM radio stations. At night, when AM band signals travel much farther, it reduces power to 5,000 watts to limit interference to other stations broadcasting on 1270 AM.

== History ==
KFLC's first license, with the sequentially issued callsign KFQB, was granted on May 12, 1924, to the Searchlight Publishing Company in Fort Worth, Texas, operating on 1180 kHz with 100 watts. (Some station accounts trace its history to an earlier station, WPA, operated by the Fort Worth Record, which was first licensed on March 16, 1922, and deleted on May 24, 1923.) During the 1920s, the station's frequency assignment was changed multiple times, including, in 1927 alone, 590, 1150, 920, and 900 kHz. On November 11, 1928, as part of the implementation of the Federal Radio Commission's General Order 40, KFQB was assigned to 1240 kHz.

KFQB was initially under the oversight of Reverend J. Frank Norris of the First Baptist Church. In early 1927, ownership was transferred to the Lone Star Broadcast Company, however, as part of this sale, which carried over to future owners, Norris retained the right to broadcast over the station on Sundays without charge.

In late 1928, A. P. Barrett purchased the station after forming the Texas Air Transport Broadcast Company, and the call sign was changed to KTAT. A year later, the call sign was changed to KSAT, although a few months after that it was changed back to KTAT. In 1935, the station was briefly shifted to 570 kHz, before returning to 1240 kHz.

=== KFJZ ===
The original KFJZ was first licensed in September 1923 to the 112th Cavalry of the Texas National Guard. By 1939, it was operating on 1370 kHz as the key outlet of the Texas State Network. At this point, the network's general manager, Elliott Roosevelt, arranged to purchase KTAT, which was operating with higher power than KFJZ. As part of the sales agreement, the license for the original KFJZ was surrendered and that station deleted. The staff from the original KFJZ was then transferred to the KTAT studios in the Hotel Texas, and on August 17, KTAT's call sign was changed to KFJZ.

On March 29, 1941, under the provisions of the North American Regional Broadcasting Agreement, most U.S. stations operating on 1240 kHz, including KFJZ, moved to 1270 kHz. During the 1960s and 1970s, KFJZ was a leading Top 40 station in Fort Worth. In 1980, it changed format to adult standards branded as "Music of Your Life", having moved the Top 40 format to KFJZ-FM 97.1.

=== Later years ===
In 1984, KFJZ's call sign was changed to KSSA. (The historic KFJZ call sign was then picked up by a Dallas station operating on AM 870.) Marcos A. Rodriguez purchased KSSA in November 1986 and moved a Regional Mexican music format from FM (see KLTY) to the AM dial. AM 1270 has been a Spanish-language station since then under various call signs, becoming KESS from 1986 until 1990, when it briefly became KSBN, then returning to KESS starting the next year until 2004, when it adopted KFLC. (Note: In October 1923, the KFLC call sign had been assigned to a temporary station on 1330 kHz located at the State Fair of Texas in Dallas.)

The station has operated from transmitter tower sites in Birdville (north east Fort Worth), 4801 West Vickery (now site of a school) in south west Fort Worth, and the present site on the Arlington/Fort Worth line. From 1976 to 2006, the station operated at 5,000 watts on six towers (nominal power while actual input was 5,400 watts by day and 4,600 by night). A refit spearheaded by station engineering manager Patrick Parks and VP/Engineering David Stewart led to a rebuild, new towers, and a power increase to 50,000 watts. Matt Folkert at duTreil, Lundin and Rackley designed the new digital capable phasing and distribution system.

Even before switching to the current all-sports format, KFLC was the first station to broadcast Dallas Mavericks basketball games in Spanish. By the early 2000s, KFLC began eliminating music programming most of the day to air local Spanish-language talk shows. Starting on July 4, 2012, the station became part of the Univision America talk radio network, and adopted the slogan "Univision America Dallas 1270". In 2015, KFLC ended the Univision America news/talk format in favor of Spanish-language contemporary Christian music as "Amor Celestial 1270" (translated as "Heavenly Love 1270").

On December 20, 2016, Univision announced that KFLC would be a charter network affiliate of Univision Deportes Radio, a Spanish-language sports network, which launched on April 19, 2017 and was renamed TUDN Radio on July 20, 2019. KFLC also signed up to air Texas Rangers baseball games until at least 2019. (KESS had previously broadcast Rangers games from 1999 to 2010.) KFLC continued to carry Dallas Mavericks games as well as adding FC Dallas soccer games. This move filled the Spanish sports hole after KZMP swapped from ESPN Deportes Radio to a simulcast of an FM Regional Mexican station. KZMP later returned to ESPN Deportes, until that network shut down on September 8, 2019, leaving KFLC once again as the metroplex's lone Spanish sports station.

On June 3, 2022, Univision announced it would sell a package of 18 radio stations across 10 of its markets, primarily AM outlets in large cities (including KFLC) and entire clusters in smaller markets such as McAllen, Texas, and Fresno, California, for $60 million to a new company known as Latino Media Network (LMN); Univision proposed to handle operations for a year under agreement before turning over operational control to LMN in the fourth quarter of 2023. The sale was consummated on December 30, 2022. LMN took over operations of KFLC and sister station KFZO by the end of October 2023.

Since March 2, 2022, KFLC—prior to its sale to Latino Media Network—aired Dallas Stars hockey games vs. the Los Angeles Kings and again in 2023 vs. the Arizona Coyotes in Spanish as part of the hockey team's annual celebration of Noche Mexicana. The annual Spanish hockey broadcasts moved to then-sister stations KDXX and KESS-FM in 2024.

Sometime in December 2024, KFLC switched to Spanish AC and Regional Mexican music, branded as simply "1270 AM" (Doce setenta AM) in the daytime. KFLC still maintains Spanish-language play-by-play rights to Texas Rangers and FC Dallas games durings its nighttime TUDN Radio programming.
