= KTYK =

- Overton, Texas; United States
- Broadcast area: Tyler-Longview area
- Frequency: 100.7 MHz (HD Radio)
- Branding: Red River Radio

Programming
- Language: English
- Format: Public radio
- Subchannels: HD2: Classical music; HD3: News/Talk; HD4: Alternative Rock, “Alt Red River” (KSCL simulcast)
- Affiliations: NPR; BBC World Service; Public Radio Exchange

Ownership
- Owner: Louisiana State University in Shreveport; (Board Supervisors, Louisiana State University and A&M College)
- Sister stations: KBSA; KDAQ; KLDN; KLSA

History
- First air date: November 6, 1961
- Former call signs: KIMP-FM (1961–1974); KPXI (1974–2018)
- Call sign meaning: Tyler-Kilgore

Technical information
- Licensing authority: FCC
- Facility ID: 29916
- Class: C3
- ERP: 8,100 watts
- HAAT: 174 meters (571 ft)
- Transmitter coordinates: 32°9′7.6″N 95°3′27.8″W

Links
- Public license information: Public file; LMS
- Webcast: Listen live; HD2: Listen live; HD3: Listen live
- Website: www.redriverradio.org

KTYK (100.7 MHz) is a non-commercial radio station, licensed to Overton, Texas, and broadcasting a Public radio format, as a part of the Red River Radio Network. KTYK features news programming from NPR and the BBC.

== History ==
KTYK signed on November 6, 1961, as KIMP-FM in Mount Pleasant at 96.1 MHz. KIMP-FM was the original FM sister to 960 KIMP. It moved to 100.7 MHz in the mid-1960s and changed call letters to KPXI in 1974. It carried a beautiful music/easy listening format until the mid-1980s, when it shifted to a gold-based AC format that began phasing out the older music and playing more uptempo songs.

In 1988, it switched formats to CHR as "X-100", attempting to compete in the Tyler market with a signal that covered a large area of northeast Texas, but rarely showed significant numbers in Tyler due to its limited signal strength within the city.

In September 1991, KPXI shifted back to an adult contemporary format, and flipped to country music by the end of the year. It aired various derivatives of country under the branding of "K-101" until it moved to Overton and downgraded to a C3 signal in June 1999. This allowed co-channel KRJT 100.7 to relocate from Bowie to Highland Village as KLTY (now KWRD-FM), a rimshot of the Dallas-Fort Worth Metroplex. After briefly airing an oldies format, KPXI switched to a simulcast of KWRD Highland Village.

KPXI was owned by various members of the Ward family from its sign on in the early 1960s until it went into receivership in the early 1990s. East Texas Broadcasting purchased it from the receivership and sold it to Sunburst, which owned other Tyler/Longview market stations at the time. Sunburst exited the radio business in 2000 and sold KPXI to Salem along with KLTY. Sunburst's other Tyler/Longview area stations were sold to Waller Broadcasting.

Jerry Hanszen purchased KPXI from Salem Media subsidiary Inspiration Media of Texas, LLC on June 3, 2009. In doing so, KPXI became the sister station to co-owned KWRD in Henderson, which Hanszen purchased from former Tyler City Councilman Jerry Russell. KPXI dropped the simulcast of KWRD-FM upon completion of the sale and switched to a Classic Country format branded as "The Heartbeat of East Texas, KPXI 100.7 FM".

On September 12, 2018, the license transfer of KPXI was granted by the Federal Communications Commission from Hanszen Broadcasting to the Board of Supervisors at Louisiana State University after the two parties reached a deal for L.S.U. to acquire the station. Neither sister station KWRD, nor its FM translator, was included in the sale.

On October 11, 2018, KPXI went silent in preparation of the facility's acquisition by Louisiana State University. As a result of the sale of KPXI, former sister station KWRD returned to its heritage country format, along with its FM translator at 98.5 MHz.

Completion of the license transfer took place on October 11, 2018, with KPXI dropping the longtime call letters associated with the facility to the current KTYK, which is representative of the programming targeting the cities of Tyler and Kilgore.
