= KDXX =

Radio station in Lewisville, Texas

- Lewisville, Texas; United States
- Broadcast area: Dallas–Fort Worth metroplex
- Frequency: 107.9 MHz (HD Radio)
- Branding: Latino Mix 107.9

Programming
- Language: Spanish
- Format: Contemporary hit radio
- Subchannels: HD2: Tejano music "Stream Tejano"; HD3: Telugu "Radio Surabhi"; HD4: Bollywood "Radio Azad"

Ownership
- Owner: Uforia Audio Network; (Univision Radio San Francisco, Inc.)
- Sister stations: KAMV; KLNO; Also part of the Univision cluster: TV stations KUVN and KSTR

History
- First air date: 1992
- Former call signs: KPXG (1992–1994); KECS (1994–1998); KDOS (1998–2002); KDXX-FM (2002); KDXX (2002–2003); KESS-FM (2003–2013); KFZO (2013–2016)
- Call sign meaning: Dallas/Fort Worth's "Latino Mix"

Technical information
- Licensing authority: FCC
- Facility ID: 57376
- Class: C1
- ERP: 100,000 watts
- HAAT: 299 meters (981 ft)
- Transmitter coordinates: 33°19′42.4″N 97°03′57.4″W

Links
- Public license information: Public file; LMS
- Webcast: Listen live (via iHeartRadio)
- Website: www.univision.com/dallas/kdxx; www.radiosurabhi.com (HD3); radioazad.us (HD4)

KDXX (107.9 FM) is a Spanish-language contemporary hit radio formatted commercial radio station serving the Dallas/Fort Worth Metroplex in Texas. The station is licensed to Lewisville, Texas, and The radio studios are located in the Univision Tower at the Plaza of The Americas in the City Center District of Downtown Dallas. KDXX is owned by Uforia Audio Network.

KDXX has an effective radiated power (ERP) of 100,000 watts, the maximum for non-grandfathered FM stations. The transmitter is on County Route 2153 in Denton.

== History ==
=== Early years ===
The current version of 107.9 was made possible when Marcos A. Rodriguez successfully obtained a new class C2 licensed to Gainesville, Texas, and purchased 107.9, a Class C licensed to Corsicana, Texas. After Rodriguez sold to Heftel Broadcasting and Mac Tichenor gained control of HBC, Tichenor moved the Corsicana signal south to the Waco market (as the new class A6 in Robinson, Texas, called KHCK-FM) and allowed the Gainesville signal to upgrade and move into Dallas as a class C1 in Lewisville, Texas.

The upgrade project had been started under the Cecil Heftel version of HBC, and completed by the engineers at Tichenor Media/HBC working under David Stewart (now owner of an upgrade consultancy, Moving Target Consulting Works). The call letters changed a few times through KDXX and KESS-FM.

=== 107.9 La Kalle ===
On February 19, 2009, the regional Mexican station branded as "La Que Buena" was moved from KESS-FM to KDXX (107.1 FM) and KFZO (99.1 FM). The reggaeton-formatted station and the "La Kalle" (Spanish for "The Street") branding were then moved to KESS-FM and shortly after, the format was retooled to Latin pop.

The KESS call letters were first used in D/FW in the spring of 1976, when Marcos Rodriguez Sr. father of Marcos A. Rodriguez gained control of a country station, KBUY-FM 93.9. That station changed to 94.1 when it moved its transmitter to Cedar Hill, Texas, in order to avoid a spacing problem with another Dallas station.

In late 2011, the La Kalle format was dissolved and replaced with a simulcast of its sister station KDXX. It was in competition with CBS Radio's Spanish rhythmic AC station KMVK prior to the recent format change.

=== Top 40/rhythmic era ===
On June 28, 2012, KESS flipped to bilingual Top 40/CHR, billed as "Radio H2O" (H2O: Hispanic 2.0) with a mostly English-language presentation with some Spanish pop hits, targeting bilingual and younger Hispanics. The last song of the Recuerdo format was "El Sol No Regresa" by La 5ª Estación with the first song of the H2O station being "Hotel Room Service" by Pitbull. The station initially ran jockless. However, new DJ Stephanie Marie handled the midday drive from 10 a.m. to 3 p.m. Texas-based pop singer Austin Mahone became a guest DJ on October 22. DJ AK handles the club mix program at 5 and 9 pm weeknights. The station did not hire any more DJs during this time. The H2O format competed head-on with Clear Channel-owned KHKS and Cumulus Media's KLIF-FM, and shared audience with CBS-owned station KMVK (Latin pop). In November 2012, "Radio H2O" leaned more of a rhythmic direction. Liberman-owned KTCY was one of its competitors until February 8, 2013, when Educational Media Foundation took over ownership and preparing to launch satellite-fed Christian rock format Air1.

On May 9, 2013, Univision announced that KESS would rebrand to "Hot 107.9" as it shifted directions to a more conventional rhythmic Top 40 presentation, in part due to an increase in the ratings since phasing out Spanish music and content. On May 17, at noon, the station officially rebranded as "Hot 107.9" and made the evolution to a rhythmic direction, putting it in line with sister stations KBBT in San Antonio and KKSS in Albuquerque.

=== 107.9 today ===
On July 29, Univision pulled the plug on KESS' rhythmic format after two months without a word of a format change announcement, making it not only the shortest-ran rhythmic station in the Metroplex, but one of the shortest-ran format periods for both the rhythmic format and radio history, and leaving said metro area without such a format once again. It was replaced by KFZO's regional Mexican format after KFZO (now KESS-FM) became a simulcast of sister station Spanish top 40 sister KDXX. The shuffling was done in response to KMVK's shift from Spanish contemporary to regional Mexican and to protect KLNO, which KMVK will be competing against.

On August 9, KESS-FM swapped call letters with KFZO.

Sometime in early 2014, KFZO (alongside other Univision-owned stations) dropped their "La Jefa" branding in favor of using its frequency as its ident. However, it brought back the previous branding in late 2015.

On February 17, 2016, Univision has swapped call signs and formats on this station and 99.1 once again, marking the return of the KDXX call letters on this particular frequency after 13 years. A day later, 107.9 simulcast from KESS-FM "Latino Mix". (This simulcast arrangement lasted until July 2026 when "Latino Mix" moved its operations to KDXX entirely and flipped 107.1 FM to a Spanish-language adult contemporary format using the "Amor" branding, which occurred at 11:55 a.m. on July 27).

Aside from nightly and weekend mix shows, KDXX's specialty programming includes select sporting events in Spanish. Starting in 2024, KDXX airs annual Dallas Stars National Hockey League games in March as part of the team's Hispanic Heritage Night—something hosted on then-sister TUDN Radio station KFLC (1270 AM) for two years prior to its sale to Latino Media Network.

== KDXX HD Radio programming ==
KDXX broadcasts in HD Radio with its HD2 subchannel initially simulcasting San Antonio-based sister station KXTN-FM with a Tejano music format (labeled as "Tejano HD Dallas"). In the months following the format change, the HD broadcasts were temporarily discontinued. However, they have been restored in the beginning of 2012. In August 2013, the "Hot 107.9" format (rhythmic CHR) resumed on this station's HD2 subchannel (replacing KXTN's simulcast), their official website through audio streaming and through iHeartRadio for over two weeks until Wednesday August 14 when "Hot 107.9 HD2" was replaced with a simulcast of KDXX/KESS until 2016 when KDXX-HD2 simulcast from KFZO.

Sometime in early 2022, KDXX launched a third digital subchannel (HD3) to simulcast Spanish sports station KFLC. This simulcast ceased operations in 2024, a few months after KFLC's new owner Latino Media Network took over full operations.

== Signal ==
Unlike most of the area's FM stations like sister KLNO, which transmit their signals from Cedar Hill, KDXX transmits its signal from an area east-southeast of Sanger. Therefore, KDXX's signal is much stronger in the northern majority of the Dallas/Fort Worth Metroplex including Dallas, Fort Worth, Denton, and McKinney as well as the cities of Decatur, Gainesville, Sherman, and Bonham, but is considerably weaker in southern parts of the Dallas/Fort Worth Metroplex pointing south.
