= KMKI =

KMKI may refer to:

- KMKI-LD, a defunct low-power television station (channel 46) formerly licensed to serve Cedar Falls, Iowa, United States
- KTNO (Plano, Texas), a radio station (620 AM) licensed to serve Plano, Texas, United States, which held the call sign KMKI from 1998 to 2015
