= KWRD-FM =

Radio station in Highland Village, Texas

- Highland Village, Texas; United States
- Broadcast area: Dallas–Fort Worth metroplex
- Frequency: 100.7 MHz
- Branding: The Word 100.7 FM

Programming
- Language: English
- Format: Christian radio
- Affiliations: Salem Radio Network

Ownership
- Owner: Salem Media Group; (Inspiration Media of Texas, LLC)
- Sister stations: KSKY

History
- First air date: November 15, 1987
- Former call signs: KRJT-FM (1988–2000); KLTY (2000)
- Call sign meaning: The Word

Technical information
- Licensing authority: FCC
- Facility ID: 6560
- Class: C
- ERP: 98,000 watts
- HAAT: 606 meters (1,988 ft)
- Transmitter coordinates: 33°32′14.4″N 96°49′55″W

Links
- Public license information: Public file; LMS
- Website: thewordfm.com

KWRD-FM (100.7 MHz) is a commercial radio station licensed to Highland Village, Texas, and serving the Dallas–Fort Worth metroplex. It is owned by the Salem Media Group and broadcasts a Christian radio format as "The Word".

KWRD-FM has an effective radiated power of 98,000 watts. Its transmitter is off Minnis Road in Collinsville, Texas. The station's studios and offices are located in Irving.

== History ==
=== KRJT-FM ===
The station first signed on the air on November 15, 1988, as KRJT-FM in Bowie, Texas. It largely simulcasted its AM sister station, KRJT (1410 AM, now KNTX). KRJT-FM's effective radiated power was 3,000 watts, a fraction of its current output.

Bowie is about 90 miles northwest of the Dallas-Fort Worth Metroplex. The owners realized that if their FM station could move closer to Dallas, its value would greatly increase. The Federal Communications Commission granted its request to become a "move in" station. It changed its city of license to Highland Village, just north of both Dallas and Fort Worth, and the transmitter was relocated to Collinsville with a big increase in power, 98,000 watts.

=== KLTY and KWRD-FM ===
In 1997, Salem Communications bought KEWS. That station had a long history of broadcasting Christian programming, once owned by evangelist Jimmy Swaggart. Salem began running its own Christian talk and teaching format on the station as KWRD-FM, "The Word 94.9". In early 2000, Salem acquired an FM station on 100.7 in the Dallas suburbs, airing Christian Contemporary music as KLTY-FM.

On December 22, 2000, Salem swapped the two stations' frequencies to give KLTY the stronger signal.

On September 18, 2015, KWRD-FM began simulcasting on former Radio Disney affiliate KMKI (620 AM, now KTNO) for a week. The following week, KMKI switched formats to Business News/Talk with content formerly airing on KVCE (1160 AM). On October 20, 2015, KWRD-FM's programming was again simulcast on KVCE. That station is now KBDT, with new owners and a talk radio format. 10 Years later, KWRD-FM began simulcasting once again on KTNO 620 AM after the Spanish Christian format "Radio Luz" ceased programming. Since April 13, 2026, KTNO has ceased operations altogether.

=== KPXI ===
KPXI (100.7 MHz, now KTYK) had been originally licensed to Mount Pleasant and the ownership had tried to be the move in to DFW winner but the former KJRT eventually prevailed in the contest. Salem Media bought KPXI out of foreclosure and moved it to Overton (near Tyler) to clear the frequency for the 100.7 in DFW. KPXI simulcast KWRD-FM until early 2009. when the FCC approved the transfer of KPXI to Jerry T. Hanszen owner of KGAS and KMHT. In 2018, KPXI was sold to Louisiana State University Shreveport and now operates as public radio station KTYK Overton, broadcasting the Red River Radio network.
