= KSTR-DT =

Television station in Irving, Texas

ATSC 3.0 station
- Irving–Dallas–Fort Worth, Texas; United States
- City: Irving, Texas
- Channels: Digital: 34 (UHF); Virtual: 49
- Branding: UniMás 49

Programming
- Affiliations: 49.1: UniMás; 49.3: Court TV

Ownership
- Owner: TelevisaUnivision; (UniMas Dallas LLC)
- Sister stations: TV: KUVN-DT; Radio: KAMV, KDXX, KLNO

History
- First air date: April 17, 1984
- Former call signs: KLTJ (1984–1987); KHSX (1987–1992); KHSX-TV (1992–1999); KSTR-TV (1999–2009)
- Former channel numbers: Analog: 49 (UHF, 1984–2009); Digital: 48 (UHF, 2002–2020)
- Former affiliations: TBN (1984–1986); HSN (primary 1986–1999, secondary 1999–2002); Independent (1999–2002)
- Call sign meaning: Lone Star State (reference to the official state nickname of Texas); K-Star (station's former branding)

Technical information
- Licensing authority: FCC
- Facility ID: 60534
- ERP: 1,000 kW
- HAAT: 517 m (1,696 ft)
- Transmitter coordinates: 32°32′36″N 96°57′33″W

Links
- Public license information: Public file; LMS
- Website: www.univision.com/unimas

KSTR-DT (channel 49) is a television station licensed to Irving, Texas, United States, broadcasting the Spanish-language UniMás network to the Dallas–Fort Worth metroplex. It is owned and operated by TelevisaUnivision alongside Univision outlet KUVN-DT (channel 23). The two stations share studios at the Univision Tower on Bryan Street in downtown Dallas; KSTR-DT's transmitter is located in Cedar Hill, Texas.

== History ==
=== Early history ===
The station first signed on the air on April 17, 1984, as KLTJ-TV (the call letters stood for "Keep Looking to Jesus"). Founded by Eldred Thomas, owner of radio station KVTT-FM (91.7, now KKXT), it originally maintained a religious programming format as an affiliate of the Trinity Broadcasting Network (TBN). In early 1986, Thomas sold the station to Silver King Broadcasting, the broadcasting arm of the Home Shopping Network (HSN). As a result of the sale, the station became an affiliate of HSN in September of that year; this left TBN without an outlet in the Dallas–Fort Worth metroplex for the next five months, until it launched owned-and-operated station KDTX-TV (channel 58) in February 1987. On June 1, 1987, the station changed its call letters to KHSX (standing for "Home Shopping in Texas").

On November 27, 1995, veteran television executive Barry Diller announced that he would acquire the Home Shopping Network and Silver King Communications, which owned HSN-affiliated stations in several other larger media markets. The purchase was finalized on December 19, 1996, ten months after the transaction received approval by the Federal Communications Commission (FCC) on March 11. Two years later in 1997, HSN purchased the USA Network, and renamed its broadcast television subsidiary as USA Broadcasting, as part of a corporate rebranding borrowing from the identity of its new cable channel property. That year, KHSX began carrying a one-hour block of programming from business news channel Bloomberg Information Television (now simply Bloomberg Television) at 6 a.m. daily and added a block of classic children's programs on Sunday mornings.

=== As an independent station ===
In June 1998, USA Broadcasting launched a customized independent station format, "CityVision", which infused syndicated programming—including a few produced by sister production unit Studios USA that also aired nationally on USA Network—with a limited amount of local entertainment and magazine programs (reminiscent of the format used by CITY-TV in Toronto and more prominently, that station's sister broadcast television properties that became charter stations of Citytv, when CHUM Limited expanded the format to other Canadian markets as a television system in 2002).

Former logo under the "K-Star 49" brand, used from October 15, 1999, to January 13, 2002.

On October 15, 1999, the station changed its call letters to KSTR-TV (which were used as part of the station's branding, phonetically pronounced as "K-Star"). Channel 49 adopted the "CityVision" format first adopted the previous fall by Miami sister station WAMI-TV on that date, converting into a general entertainment independent station; HSN programming remained part of the schedule, however it was relegated to two separate blocks, running nightly from 2 to 5:30 a.m.

KSTR's initial lineup under the "CityVision" format began to primarily feature a mix of reality shows (such as America's Funniest Home Videos and Real TV), sitcoms (such as Sister, Sister, The Three Stooges, The Andy Griffith Show and NewsRadio) and talk shows during the daytime and prime time, as well as drama series (Knight Rider and The A-Team) on weekend evenings, and movies—under the Star Time Movies banner—during prime time on weekends and on Sunday late afternoons. It also aired USA's original programs (such as Tens—rebroadcast from its Miami sister station WAMI-TV—and Strip Poker), along with the regionally syndicated newscast The News of Texas. It also carried a decent lineup of children's programming on Saturday mornings, including those sourced from the BKN syndication block (such as Highlander: The Animated Series, Mighty Max, Adventures of Sonic the Hedgehog, Sonic Underground, Jumanji, Pocket Dragon Adventures, Beakman's World and Extreme Dinosaurs).

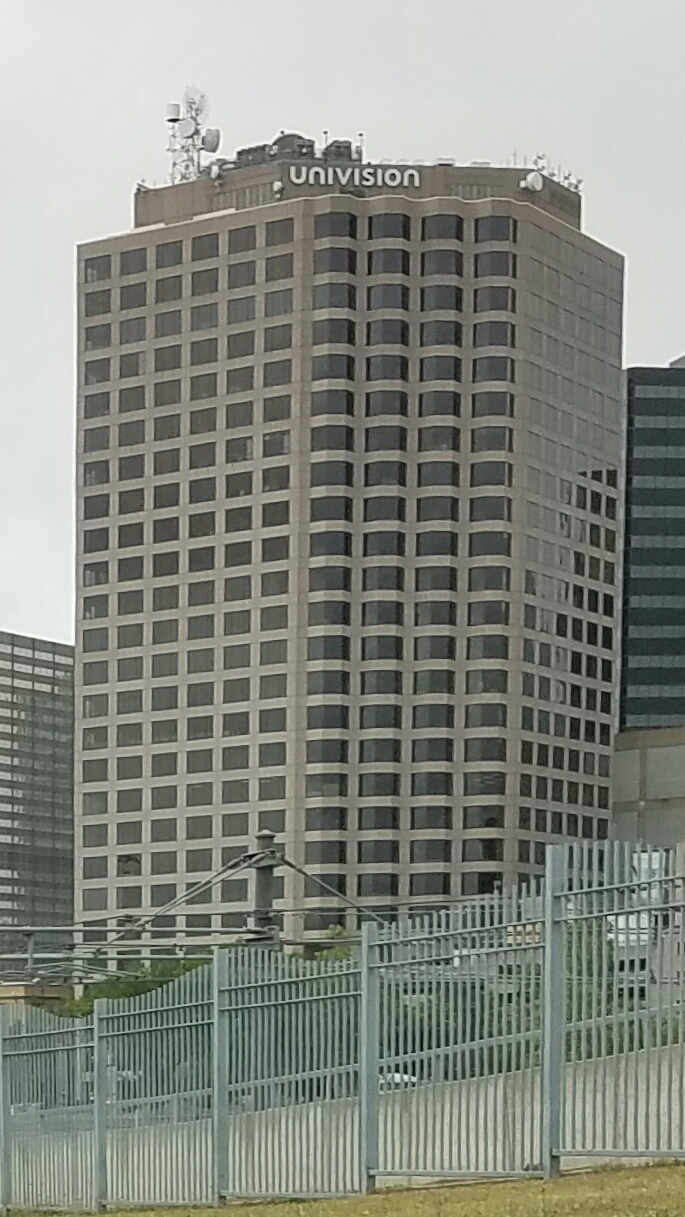
Main studios and office building for KSTR-DT and sister station KUVN-DT in downtown Dallas.

During this period, KSTR served as the official station for the Dallas Mavericks NBA franchise. KSTR also broadcast select Fort Worth Brahmas games from the defunct Western Professional Hockey League. The station also used the "City Vision" ("Your City is Our Studio") bumper cards common with USA-owned stations that had converted to general entertainment independents during this time. The local programming-infused format that was adopted by KSTR-DT and its sister stations in Atlanta and Miami, was originally planned to be expanded to the remainder of USA Broadcasting's stations, with some (such as WHOT-TV in Atlanta and WHUB-TV in Boston) having either already adopted or eventually switching to the format.

Due to financial problems, in September 2000, USA eliminated half of KSTR's entertainment programming inventory, filling the newly opened time periods with an expanded block of infomercials during the morning and an additional block of HSN programming on weekday mornings from 8 a.m. to noon (later reduced to a three-hour block from 10 a.m. to 1 p.m. by September 2001). The station also reduced its children's programs inventory to a daily half-hour of educational programming (consisting of the reality-documentary series Animal Rescue).

=== Sale to Univision ===
In the summer of 2000, USA Networks announced that it would sell off its television station group, in order to focus on its cable network and television production properties. Among the prospective buyers for the USA Broadcasting unit was The Walt Disney Company—the corporate parent of ABC, the network affiliated locally with WFAA (channel 8)—which was the original frontrunner to purchase the thirteen-station group. However, Spanish-language broadcaster Univision Communications beat out Disney and the competing bidders in a close race, securing a deal to purchase the USA Broadcasting stations for $1.1 billion on December 7, 2000. When the sale was finalized on May 21, 2001, KSTR became part of a duopoly with Univision owned-and-operated station KUVN (channel 23).

The week prior to the sale's completion, on May 15, 2001, Univision Communications announced during its upfront presentation that it would launch a secondary television network—later announced to be named TeleFutura (now UniMás) on July 31—that would compete with Univision, Telemundo and the then-recently launched Azteca América. Univision would utilize the former USA Broadcasting stations to serve as charter outlets of the network, which would cater to bilingual Latinos and young adult males between the ages 18 and 34 that seldom watch Spanish language television other than sporting events.

Former logo as a TeleFutura O&O, used from January 14, 2002, to January 6, 2013.

Univision, however, continued to maintain English language programming formats on the ten HSN affiliates (including WUTF-DT, which reaffiliated with HSN in January 2001) and three independent stations it acquired from USA Networks for fourteen months following the completion of the purchase. Despite this, the station utilized its ties to Univision on September 11, 2001, when KSTR simulcast live coverage of the terror attacks on the World Trade Center in New York City and The Pentagon in Arlington, Virginia, as well as the crash of United Airlines Flight 93 in Shanksville, Pennsylvania, from KUVN for several days afterward, before resuming what was left of its regular English language schedule on September 18. On September 2, 2001, Channel 49 began incorporating daily, two-hour-long mini-marathons of The Andy Griffith Show and movies to fill part of its schedule for its final months as an English-language station.

KSTR officially converted into a Spanish language station on January 14, 2002, when it became an owned-and-operated station of TeleFutura, which initially launched on that date on 18 Univision-owned stations (including eleven of KSTR's large-market sister stations under USA Broadcasting ownership). The meager programming inventory that had occupied KSTR's schedule prior to the switch was subsequently acquired by KFWD (channel 52, now a ShopHQ affiliate), which itself converted into an English-language independent station days earlier on January 1, after losing its Telemundo affiliation to KXTX-TV (channel 39) as a result of NBC/Telemundo's acquisition of that station; the local over-the-air television rights to the Mavericks were concurrently transferred to then-UPN affiliate KTXA (channel 21, now an independent station).

=== ATSC 3.0 experimental broadcast ===
In January 2018, Sinclair Broadcast Group, Nexstar Media Group, and Univision Communications announced that they reached an agreement with American Tower Corporation to construct an ATSC 3.0 single-frequency network in Dallas. It was decided that Univision-owned KSTR-DT would become the test station, with Univision owned-and-operated sister station KUVN-DT, and Sinclair-operated station KTXD-TV, providing ATSC 1.0 simulcasts of KSTR-DT's programming during the tests.

In November 2018, KSTR-DT submitted an experimental special temporary authority (STA) to the FCC, to test ATSC 3.0 distributed transmission system (DTS) broadcasting. The FCC granted the STA in February 2019, with testing beginning in March 2019. KSTR-DT's ATSC 3.0 DTS test consisted of four transmitters located throughout the Dallas–Fort Worth metroplex, all broadcasting on UHF channel 48: Cedar Hill (main transmitter), Garland, Fort Worth, and Denton.

In July 2019, KSTR-DT shut down its channel 48 transmitters as part of the broadcast frequency repacking process following the 2016-2017 FCC incentive auction, and began broadcasting from an auxiliary transmitter on its assigned displacement channel 34. DTS testing resumed after all transmitters were broadcasting on channel 34.

Due to ATSC 3.0-capable tuners not being widely available, KSTR-DT began simulcasting its programming on KUVN-DT (49.1 UniMás & 49.3 Grit) and KTXD-TV (49.2 getTV) in February 2019.

== Technical information ==
=== Subchannels ===
Subchannels provided by KSTR-DT (ATSC 1.0) on the KUVN-DT multiplex
Subchannel	Res.	Short name	Programming	ATSC 1.0 host
49.1	720p	KSTR-DT	UniMás	KUVN-DT
49.3	480i	CourtTV	Court TV → TBA (soon)	KUVN-DT

These subchannels are also rebroadcast on KUVN-CD in Fort Worth, which repeats the entire KUVN multiplex, with different minor channel numbers (49.11 and 49.13, respectively).

The station's ATSC 3.0 signal carries the feeds of KDFW, KUVN-DT, and KDAF instead of its secondary program streams:

Subchannels of KSTR (ATSC 3.0)
Channel	Res.	Short name	Programming
4.1	1080p	KDFW*NX	Fox (KDFW)
23.1	1080p	KUVN*NX	Univision (KUVN-DT)
33.1	1080p	KDAF*NX	The CW (KDAF)
49.1	1080p	KSTR*NX	UniMás

=== Analog-to-digital conversion ===
KSTR-TV shut down its analog signal, over UHF channel 49, on January 12, 2009. The station's digital signal remained on its pre-transition UHF channel 48, using virtual channel 49.
