= KBDT =

- Highland Park, Texas; United States
- Broadcast area: Dallas/Fort Worth Metroplex
- Frequency: 1160 kHz
- Branding: Radio Saigon Dallas

Programming
- Language: South Asian
- Format: Full-service

Ownership
- Owner: Charles Kim; (Pacific Star Media LLC)
- Operator: 1160 Investments LLC

History
- First air date: March 1960
- Former call signs: KVIL (1960–1985, 1986–1994); KVIX (1985–1986); KDMM (1994–2001); KBIS (2001–2005); KMGS (2005–2006); KVCE (2006–2017)
- Call sign meaning: "Big D's Talk"

Technical information
- Licensing authority: FCC
- Facility ID: 28618
- Class: B
- Power: 35,000 watts (day); 1,000 watts (night)
- Transmitter coordinates: 33°10′37″N 97°40′36″W (day); 33°2′21″N 96°56′34″W (night)

Links
- Public license information: Public file; LMS
- Webcast: Listen live
- Website: saigondallasradio.com

KBDT (1160 AM) is a commercial radio station licensed to Highland Park, Texas, United States, and serving the Dallas/Fort Worth Metroplex. The station is owned by Trong Phan, through licensee KOLBE GOOD NEWS MEDIA, LLC. It broadcasts an Vietnamese Asian format.

KBDT has two transmitter sites for daytime and nighttime operation; the daytime transmitter is off County Road 3250 in Paradise, Texas, while the nighttime site is on Huffines Boulevard in Lewisville.

== History ==
=== KVIL AM ===
The station's first FCC license was granted 6-29-1960. The station was formerly on 1150 kHz as KVIL, owned by University Broadcasting. The original location of the studios was in the Highland Park Village Shopping Center (hence the VIL call letters). The address was 4152 Mockingbird Lane at Preston Road, overlooking the Dallas Country Club golf course. At first, KVIL was a daytimer, powered at only 500 watts and required to sign-off at night. It got a power boost to 1,000 watts a short time later, but was still restricted to daytime-only operation.

In 1961, FM sister station KVIL-FM officially signed on. In a large city like Dallas, the FCC would discourage AM and FM stations from simulcasting. However, due to KVIL's daytimer status, as well as the station's city of license being Highland Park, KVIL and KVIL-FM were able run the same programming for all the hours the AM station was on the air. In the 1960s, KVIL-AM-FM played Top 40 hits. By the 1970s, the music became more adult-oriented, while the disc jockeys and station formatics remained youthful and contemporary.

KVIL-AM-FM was a highly rated hot adult contemporary station in the Dallas-Fort Worth radio market for much of the late 1970s and 1980s, often finishing at #1 in the Arbitron ratings. While the FM station had most of the listeners, KVIL was available to people who did not have FM radios in their cars or offices and wanted to hear the station on AM.

=== Infinity buys KVIL ===
In 1987, Infinity Broadcasting bought KVIL-AM-FM from Sconnix Broadcasting. The sale price was $82 million, the largest amount of money in radio history for an AM-FM combo up to that date. Sconnix had acquired KVIL-AM-FM only the month before in an eight-station deal. Infinity president Mel Karmazin said his company wanted a station in Dallas and "the best there is KVIL." Infinity later was folded into CBS Radio.

AM 1150 adopted the call sign KVIX and programmed a separate AC format from KVIL-FM for a short time after the sale to Infinity. Since nearly all listeners had FM radios by the 1990s, Infinity decided to sell the AM station.

=== South Asian programming ===
In October 1996, the station was sold to Marcos A. Rodriguez, who was its owner until August 2003. Rodriguez used it to carry foreign language programs as KDMM. Due to the popular Pakistani and Indian music and talk programs, KDMM became all-South Asian formatted. Initially, the station was allowed 1,000 watts daytime only with a six tower directional array located on the western edge of the L.B Houston Golf Course, a City of Dallas public property, abutting the eastern bank of the Elm Fork of the Trinity River, just south of Royal Lane. The ground lease agreement with the city of Dallas allowed for broadcast radio operations for $1 and for a period not to exceed 100 years. The lease stipulated that, If radio broadcasting ceased for a period of six months or longer, the land lease would be terminated and the land usage rights would revert back to the city and golf course.

By the 1990s, it was able to get a grant of five watts of power for night-time operation, although it covered only a small part of the sprawling Metroplex after sunset, a pencil beam from the Royal lane transmitter site, aimed southeast towards Highland Park.

=== Motown music ===
In 2001, it changed its call sign to KBIS, and ran an all-Motown format still on 1150 kHz. When the station moved to 1160 (now with 35,000 watts day and 1,000 watts at night from two different 6 tower sites), it was revamped as Magic 1160, adding other soul songs to the playlist. The call sign switched to KMGS in June 2005, to represent the word "Magic."

=== Talk and business ===
On August 23, 2006, the call sign changed to KVCE, to make way for a Talk radio format, which began less than a month later. At that time, Texas Senator Dan Patrick owned the station and hosted a talk show on KVCE. Over time, the station began adding more financial and business shows to the schedule.

On September 25, 2015, the business talk format moved to KMKI, later KEXB, and now KTNO. After the move, KVCE ran a 30-second "barker" continuous recording, announcing "KVCE Highland Park. Looking for business talk in North Texas? We moved to 620 AM."

=== Christian radio ===
KVCE was acquired by Salem Media, the largest owner of Christian radio stations in the U.S. It began airing religious shows from noted national preachers, as a simulcast of Salem's KWRD-FM. Salem sold the station in 2017.

On September 29, 2017, the station changed its call sign to KBDT. On November 1, 2017, 1160 Investments, LLC entered into an agreement with Dallas Broadcasting, LLC, and flipped the station to a conservative talk format. 1160 Investments is a wholly owned subsidiary of the company which also owns the USA Radio Network, and some USA programming was produced from the studios in Dallas.

=== Asian format ===
The station currently airs an Asian format, after dropping conservative talk. The format is known as Radio Saigon Dallas, and caters to the Vietnamese population of Dallas. Similar programming is heard in KRVA 1600 AM, which also goes by the name Radio Saigon. On June 1, 2022, Dallas Broadcasting sold the station to Charles Kim's Pacific Star Media LLC for $450,000.
