= Mark Davis (talk show host) =

American radio host

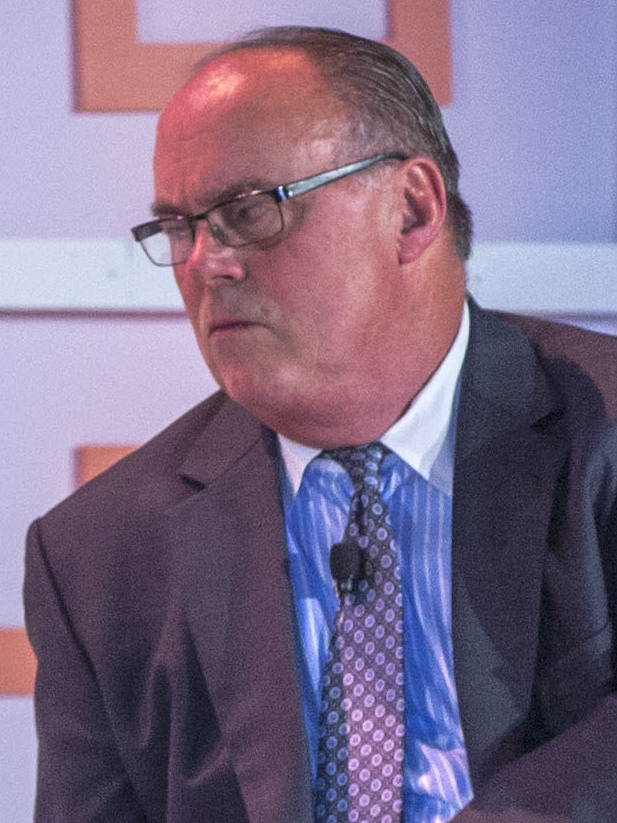
Davis in 2018

Mark Davis (born 13 November 1957) is an American radio host, newspaper columnist and political commentator. His local talk show, The Mark Davis Show, airs weekdays from 7am to 10am CT on 660AM "The Answer" KSKY in the Dallas–Fort Worth metroplex. His column is published in The Dallas Morning News. From 2008 to 2012, Davis was a rotating guest host for The Rush Limbaugh Show; from 2012 to 2017, he served as the Friday host of the Salem Radio Network's Morning in America, and continues to host network shows on a regular basis.

Davis describes himself as a libertarian conservative, opposing smoking bans, religious indoctrination in public education, and illegal immigration. He also supports the war on terror and drug prohibition.

He is the author of "Upside Down: How the Left Turned Right Into Wrong, Truth Into Lies and Good Into Bad" (2016) and Lone Star America: How Texas Can Save Our Country (2014), both from Regnery Publishing.

Born in San Antonio, Texas in 1957 and raised in the Maryland suburbs of Washington, D.C., Davis graduated from the University of Maryland in 1979 with a Bachelor of Science in Journalism.

== Program history ==
Davis started as a news anchor and reporter at WKAZ/WQBE in Charleston, West Virginia from 1979 to 1981. From there, he went to WOKV in Jacksonville, Florida, serving again as a news anchor until launching a talk show in 1982. From there he went to WHBQ in Memphis, Tennessee beginning in 1985, WMC in Memphis in 1989, WTKN in Tampa, Florida briefly in 1990, WWRC in Washington, DC 1990–1994, and WBAP in Dallas-Ft. Worth, Texas in 1994 through April 2012.

Davis was heard in national syndication with two shows, a Sunday three-hour broadcast from 1998 to 2003 and a two-hour weekday show which followed his local program from 2005 to 2007. The latter was produced mainly for ABC's satellite talk radio channel.

On July 3, 2008, his show was simulcast on C-SPAN 2. During the commercial breaks he addressed the camera and provided some behind-the-scenes insights on talk radio and the issues of the day.

In 2012, Davis announced he would be joining Dallas-based radio station "660AM The Answer" KSKY. The station is owned by Salem Media Group.

From June 8, 2012 to the program's finale April 1, 2016, Davis was the Friday host of "Morning in America," a nationally syndicated radio program. Morning in America was produced and distributed by Salem Communications' Salem Radio Network; the show was hosted by William Bennett Mondays through Thursdays.

== See also ==
- William Bennett
- WBAP
- KSKY
- Dallas Fort Worth Metroplex
