= KUVN-DT =

Television station in Garland, Texas

KUVN-DT and KUVN-CD

KUVN-DT: Garland–Dallas, Texas; KUVN-CD: Fort Worth, Texas; United States
- Channels for KUVN-DT: Digital: 33 (UHF); Virtual: 23
- Channels for KUVN-CD: Digital: 11 (VHF); Virtual: 23
- Branding: Univision 23; Noticias N+ Univision 23 (newscasts)

Programming
- Affiliations: 23.1/23.11: Univision; for others, see § Subchannels

Ownership
- Owner: TelevisaUnivision; (KUVN License Partnership, L.P.)
- Sister stations: KSTR-DT, KAMV, KDXX, KLNO

History
- First air date: KUVN-DT: September 25, 1986
- Former call signs: KUVN-DT: KIAB-TV (1986–1988); KUVN (1988–2003); KUVN-TV (2003–2009); KUVN-CD: K31CM (1989–1996); KUVN-LP (1996–2002); KUVN-CA (2002–2015)
- Former channel number: KUVN-DT: Analog: 23 (UHF, 1986–2009); Digital: 24 (UHF, 2002–2009), 23 (UHF, 2009–2019); KUVN-CD: Analog: 31 (UHF, until 2001), 47 (UHF, 2001–2015); Digital: 47 (UHF, 2015–2019)
- Former affiliations: CTN/HSN (1986–1988)
- Call sign meaning: "Univision"

Technical information
- Licensing authority: FCC
- Facility ID: KUVN-DT: 35841; KUVN-CD: 5319
- Class: KUVN-CD: CD
- ERP: KUVN-DT: 1,000 kW; KUVN-CD: 2.2 kW
- HAAT: KUVN-DT: 542 m (1,778 ft); KUVN-CD: 133.2 m (437 ft)
- Transmitter coordinates: KUVN-DT: 32°35′22″N 96°58′12.9″W; KUVN-CD: 32°48′30″N 97°7′50.5″W

Links
- Public license information: KUVN-DT: Public file; LMS; KUVN-CD: Public file; LMS
- Website: Univision 23

KUVN-DT (channel 23) is a television station licensed to Garland, Texas, United States, broadcasting the Spanish-language Univision network to the Dallas–Fort Worth metroplex. It is owned and operated by TelevisaUnivision alongside UniMás outlet KSTR-DT (channel 49). The two stations share studios at the Univision Tower on Bryan Street in downtown Dallas; KUVN-DT's transmitter is located in Cedar Hill, Texas.

== History ==
=== Prior history of UHF channel 23 in Dallas–Fort Worth ===
Channel 23 was originally allocated to Dallas proper. The UHF Television Co.—a coalition of local oilmen—had applied for channel 23 construction permits in Dallas and Houston; the permits were granted in 1953, but they were never built and would be deleted by the Federal Communications Commission (FCC) in 1955.

==== As an educational station ====
The Richardson Independent School District then signed on an educational television station on channel 23 on February 29, 1960, KRET-TV. It was the first television station in the United States to be owned by a school district (beating KERA-TV, which was founded by the Dallas Independent School District, by eight months). KRET only broadcast on weekdays during the school year for only two hours a day initially, before expanding to the entire school day. Costing only $75,000 to build, it operated out of Richardson Junior High School before moving to Richardson High School in 1963. Although operating on a full-service license, the station only provided a signal up to 20 miles (32 km) from its transmitter. KRET-TV ceased operations in May 1970 and, on August 31, was transitioned to the "TAGER" closed-circuit television system used for high school and college telecourses; the broadcast license was returned to the FCC.

=== KUVN-DT station history ===
Former logo, used until 2006.

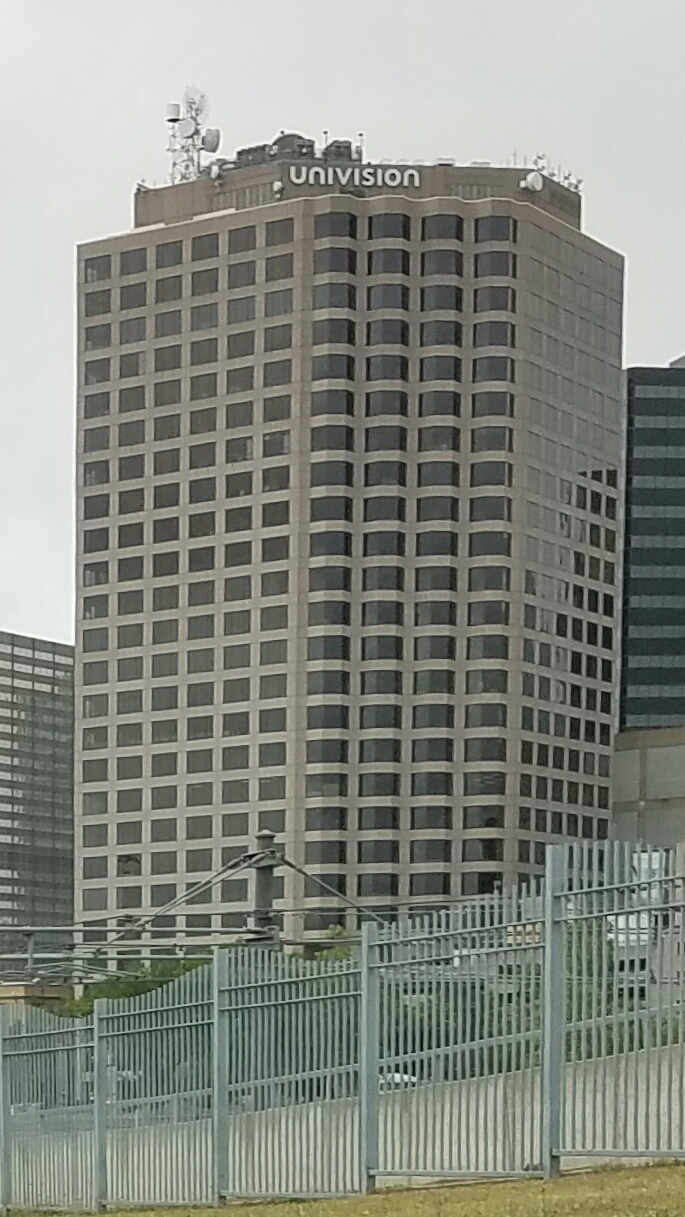
Main studios and office building for KUVN and sister station KSTR in downtown Dallas.

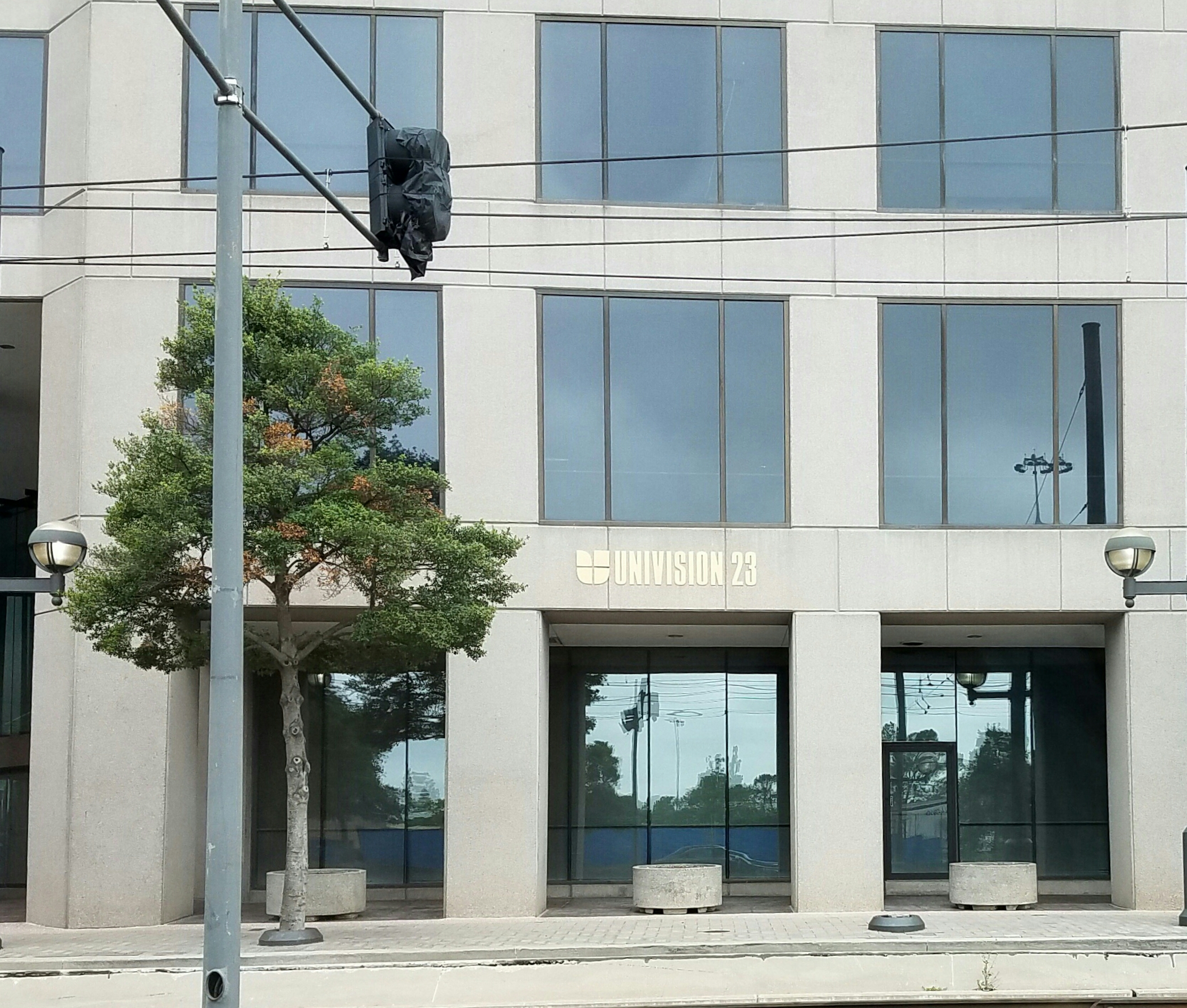
"Univision 23" sign appearing near the front door of the building housing KUVN's studios and offices; the sign still uses Univision's previous logo style.

The current television station licensed to channel 23 first signed on the air on September 25, 1986, as KIAB; it was founded by International American Broadcasting (owned by local ophthalmologist Dr. Elizabeth Vaughan and also known as I Am Broadcasting). The station, operating from studios on Marquis Street in Garland, primarily carried the Consumer Discount Network home shopping service. Houston-based CDN folded in December 1987.

I Am Broadcasting filed for bankruptcy protection in 1988, and Univision purchased the station out of bankruptcy for $5.2 million. On August 8, the station switched to Univision programming as KUVN. It was the first time Univision—the former Spanish International Network had been available over-the-air in North Texas since it had been carried from 1981 to 1984 on KNBN-TV channel 33.

=== KUVN-CD ===
KUVN-CD's construction permit was originally owned by the American Christian Television System and was transferred to Bill Trammell in 1990. In 1994, the station's license was transferred to Rodriguez-Heftel-Texas; the deal was consummated on April 10, 1995. The license was transferred to KESS-TV License Corporation on May 16, 1996. The last transfer to date was (BALTTL-19960510IC) in 1996, in which it was sold to Univision. The station relocated its signal from UHF channel 31 to channel 47 in 2001. KUVN-LP was designated as a Class A low-power station and changed its call letters to KUVN-CA on March 1, 2002. A construction permit was issued by the FCC on August 4, 2008, to allow then-KUVN-CA to operate a digital signal on channel 47, with an effective radiated power of 190 watts. The station was licensed for digital operation on June 3, 2015, and changed its call sign to KUVN-CD. KUVN-CD is not a repeater or a translator, as a Class A station cannot act as merely a repeater or translator.

== News operation ==
KUVN-DT broadcasts 20 hours, 55 minutes of locally produced newscasts each week (with 3 hours, 35 minutes each weekday; one hour on Saturdays and two hours on Sundays). Following its acquisition by Univision, the network invested in a news department for the station and began producing nightly Spanish-language local newscasts in April 1989.

On April 11, 2011, KUVN began broadcasting Primera Edición and Vive La Mañana on Telefutura affiliate KSTR (channel 49). Like its newscasts at different times, it is broadcast in 480i standard definition, within their old studio set. Sister station KXLN-DT in Houston also uses the same titles for their newscasts; Vive La Mañana features a different graphics and music package shared by both KUVN and KXLN. In 2011, a new set for KUVN's newscasts was introduced. In 2012, KUVN began broadcasting its local newscasts in high definition.

On March 27, 2015, Univision announced it would replace Univision 23's morning newscast and Univision 45's Vive La Mañana with a regionalized morning newscast called Noticias Texas Primera Edicion that would air on Univision's stations in Dallas, Houston, San Antonio, and Austin from 4 to 6 a.m., meaning that Univision 23's morning show would be canceled; its last morning newscast was on March 27, 2015. The station's morning news anchors got relocated to Houston where the new regionalized morning newscast would be based. The station also has morning news briefs and local, live cut-ins during Despierta América and the regionalized newscast. The regionalized newscast debuted on April 6, 2015; until then, there were repeats of Noticiero Univision: Edición Nocturna and entertainment programming. On April 17, 2017, KUVN launched a midday newscast called Edición Digital Dallas–Fort Worth, which viewers can watch on TV, the station's website and its digital platforms. On March 11, 2019, KUVN-DT relaunched its own morning newscast being called Primera Edición DFW, focusing solely on the Dallas–Fort Worth metroplex.

== Technical information ==
=== Subchannels ===
The stations' signals are multiplexed:

Subchannels of KUVN-DT and KUVN-CD
Subchannel		Res.	Short name	Programming
KUVN-DT	KUVN-CD	Res.	Short name	Programming
23.1	23.11	720p	KUVN-DT	Univision
23.2	23.12	480i	Bounce	Bounce TV
23.3	23.13	480i	MYSTERY	Ion Mystery
23.4	23.14	480i	MSGold	MovieSphere Gold
23.5	23.15	480i	ShopLC	Shop LC
23.6	23.16	480i	BT2	Infomercials
49.1	49.11	720p	KSTR-DT	UniMás (KSTR-DT)
49.3	49.13	480i	CourtTV	Court TV (KSTR-DT)

Subchannel broadcast with MPEG-4 video
Broadcast on behalf of another station

=== Analog-to-digital conversion ===
KUVN shut down its analog signal, over UHF channel 23, on June 12, 2009, as part of the federally mandated transition from analog to digital television. The station's digital signal relocated from its pre-transition UHF channel 24 to channel 23.
