= KLNO =

Radio station in Fort Worth, Texas

Coordinates: 32.590°N 96.970°W

- Fort Worth, Texas; United States
- Broadcast area: Dallas–Fort Worth metroplex
- Frequency: 94.1 MHz (HD Radio)
- Branding: Que Buena 94.1

Programming
- Language: Spanish
- Format: Regional Mexican
- Subchannels: HD2: TUDN Radio

Ownership
- Owner: Uforia Audio Network; (Univision Radio Illinois, Inc.)
- Sister stations: KAMV; KDXX; KUVN-DT; KSTR-DT

History
- First air date: 1961
- Former call signs: KCUL-FM (1964–1967); KBUY (1967–1976); KESS (1976–1986); KSSA (1986–1987); KOJO (1987–1989); KLTY (1989–2000); KGDE (1-2/2000)
- Former frequencies: 93.9 MHz (1961–1986)
- Call sign meaning: Estéreo Latino (former branding)

Technical information
- Facility ID: 41380
- Class: C
- ERP: 98,000 watts
- HAAT: 485 meters (1,591 ft)

Links
- Webcast: Listen live (via iHeartRadio)
- Website: www.univision.com/dallas/klno

KLNO (94.1 FM) is a regional Mexican music formatted radio station broadcasting to the Dallas–Fort Worth metroplex in Texas. The station's studios are located in the Univision Tower at the Plaza of the Americas in the City Center District of Downtown Dallas.

This signal was created in 1981 when then owner Marcos Rodriguez Sr. successfully petitioned the Federal Communications Commission (FCC) to change the frequency of KESS 93.9 to 94.1 and permit a move to the Cedar Hill, Texas antenna farm. His son, Marcos A. Rodriguez, controlled this frequency from 1986 to 1999.

In 1964, Marcos Rodriguez Sr. was hired by Mike Bradley and became the first full-time employee of 93.9 (then owned by John Walton and called KBUY-FM). John Walton purchased KBUY when it was called KCUL. Its call letters came from the backwards spelling of the original owner's name - Dr. L.H. Luck.

The station was assigned the callsign KLNO by the FCC on February 15, 2000.

Sometime in early 2014, KLNO (alongside other Univision-owned stations) has dropped its "La Que Buena" branding in favor of using the frequency as its name. This was done until 2016 when it returned to its branding.

KLNO broadcasts in HD Radio.
