= Marcos A. Rodriguez =

Cuban-American entrepreneur

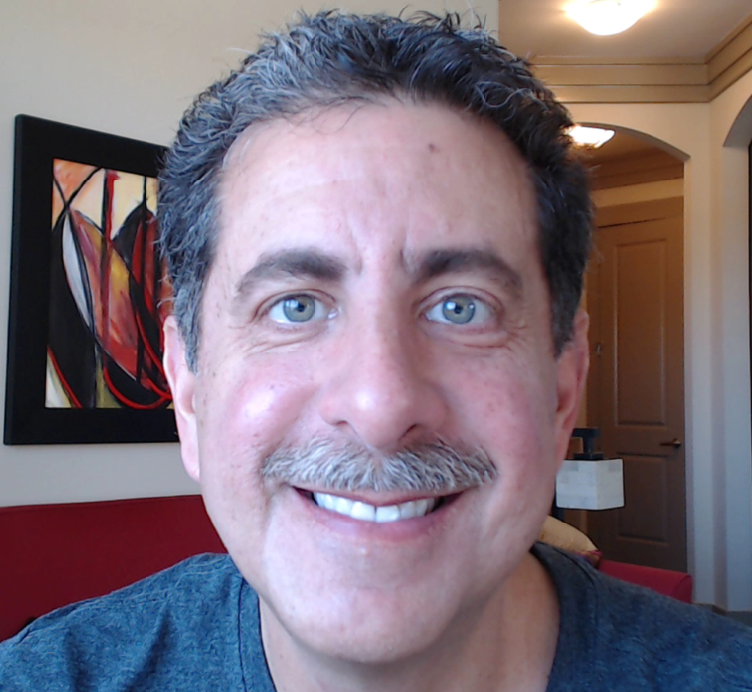
- Marcos A. Rodriguez
- Born: July 22, 1958 (age 68); Cuba
- Occupations: Radio broadcaster, entrepreneur, movie producer, businessperson and investor
- Known for: Radio broadcasting, movie producer

Marcos A. Rodriguez (born 22 July 1958) is a Cuban-American entrepreneur, movie producer, businessperson and investor. He is the founder and CEO of numerous American media outlets including KLTY; KUUR; an FM radio station serving the Carbondale, Colorado, area; and "TV Aspen" KCXP-LP, a television station in Aspen, Colorado. These radio and television stations represented the only locally owned stations in Aspen.

== Early life ==
Rodriguez was born in Cuba, shortly before Fidel Castro's revolution successfully ousted Batista at the start of 1959. Rodriguez's father, Marcos Rodriguez Sr., who was 34 at the time, was director and salesman for CMKF, a local radio station in the city of Holguín in the Oriente province. As Castro's revolutionary reforms resulted in the nationalizing of radio stations, the radio station's format, like others in Castro's Cuba, was changed, becoming a source for disseminating propaganda for the revolutionary movement. Rodriguez Sr. was demoted from his previous positions to become an announcer and was required to read propaganda over the airwaves, a situation to which he objected.

Dissatisfied, Rodriguez Sr. was eventually allowed to leave Cuba with his family in August 1962, moving to Miami. He held various odd jobs while his wife, Gisela Rodriguez, who had been a qualified pharmacist in Cuba, had difficulties finding a job as her Cuban qualifications were not easily accepted in the United States. She was finally offered a job about a year later at a pharmacy in Shreveport, Louisiana, and the family moved there. Rodriguez Sr. gained a position in broadcasting as a floor man for KTBS-TV, a Shreveport television station. Within a year, he was promoted to cameraman.

In 1964, Rodriguez Sr. moved to Texas with his family after being offered a position to work at 1540 AM (then called KCUL), a country and western station in Fort Worth. He was responsible for the station's venture to start an all-Spanish format on the new sister station on 93.9 FM (then called KBUY), the first radio station with this format in North Texas. Rodriguez Sr. continued to pursue radio broadcasting in Texas and in 1975 he purchased the station for which he previously worked and changed its call letters to KESS (that frequency is now called KLNO), becoming the first Hispanic owner of an all-Spanish radio station in Texas.

Rodriguez Sr.'s two sons, Marcos and Tony Rodriguez also developed an interest in broadcasting. Rodriguez acquired KLTY on 94.1 FM in Fort Worth, KSSA on 1600 AM in Dallas and KLAT, an AM station in Houston which was later sold to Tichenor Media System.

On 15 February 1992, Rodriguez Sr. died of a heart attack at the age of 65. His son, Marcos A. Rodriguez took over his father's station and pursued additional media ventures. Over a thirteen-year period, Rodriguez owned and programmed many stations in Texas, founding and/or operating the stations KLTY, KESS, KICK, KMRT, KTCY and TV31, under the Dallas radio group during the 1980s and 1990s. In addition to the radio stations, Rodriguez owns a real estate brokerage firm, Aspen Real Estate Company, as well as TV Aspen (Channel 19) in Aspen, Colorado, where he resides with his family.

=== Family ===
Rodriguez is married to Sonya Nance Rodriguez, with whom he has four children.

=== Education ===
Rodriguez holds a Bachelor of Business Administration (BBA) in marketing and management.

== Career ==
=== Radio and television broadcasting ===
Rodriguez has had an extensive career in radio broadcasting. He has worked at Texas radio stations KRXV, KXOL and KLAT as well as founding the radio stations KLTY, KESS-FM, KICK-FM, KMRT and KTCY, which form the Dallas Radio Group, in addition to the television station Channel 31. KLTY and KESS were each originally on 94.1 FM.

He launched KOJO, a full-service DFW radio station on 94.1 FM, a frequency previously used by sister station KESS-FM, with Paul Martin, Chuck Gratner, and Mark Elfstrand (Johnson). In 1981, the 94.1 frequency was relaunched with the KLTY call letters. KLTY-FM (94.1) was considered "the nation's largest and most successful commercial Christian radio station" and through Rodriguez's leadership, the station began to be considered as "a benchmark for other Christian format radio stations".

Rodriguez was president of KLTY up until 1994 when it was sold for $63.3 million along with other radio stations owned by Rodriguez Marketing.

While still head of Rodriguez Marketing, Rodriguez owned and operated other Spanish language radio stations in Dallas–Fort Worth. In 1994, Rodriguez Marketing was acquired by Heftel Broadcasting Corp., the nation's largest Spanish-language radio broadcasting company, for an estimated $16.6 million. KICI (1440), KICI-FM (107.9), KESS (1270) and KMRT (1480), all of which were based in Dallas, were included in the sale.

Rodriguez continued as president of the Dallas-based, wholly owned subsidiary and the alliance was renamed Rodriguez-Heftel-Texas Inc. With this merger, Heftel acquired KICK (107.9), KICI (1440) and "La Fabulosa" KESS (1270). Rodriguez still held on to KESS-TV Channel 31, which later launched the market's first 24-hour Spanish language music video television service in September 1994.

As head of the Hispanic Coalition, in October 1996, Rodriguez acquired a new FM frequency in the DFW Radio market by obtaining the 93.3 FM license from the Federal Communications Commission. First known as KNBR-FM, and referred to as "The Zone" (now WBAP-FM) in Haltom City, Texas, the Susquehanna Radio Corporation had agreed to program the previously unused frequency. The station, some 50,000 watts, is believed to have been valued close to $30 million. Rodriguez also acquired KDMM AM from Infinity that same year. Rodriguez also managed KXEB on 910 AM, a station owned by his brother, Tony. He also acquired an FM to Gainesville, Texas and purchased the 107.9 frequency, a Class C licensed to Corsicana, Texas (now KESS-FM).

In 2009, Rodriguez acquired three Glenwood FM broadcast translators (K230AZ, broadcasting on 93.9 FM, K242BL on 96.3 FM and K272AI on 102.3 FM) from its former broadcast engineer, John Dady. These transmitters facilitated an amplified broadcasting range for Rodriguez's existing radio and television stations. Rodriguez, through his company Colorado Marketing, LLC, is also the founder of Radio CMC, the campus radio station of Colorado Mountain College. The for-profit college radio, which runs on the 93.9 FM frequency in Glenwood, benefited from donations of radio equipment from Rodriguez, and his company shares the profits generated from the college station.

Rodriguez currently heads KUUR radio and TV Aspen (since November 2004).

=== Internet and technology ventures ===
Rodriguez founded Popmail.com in 1996. Based in Irving, Texas, the dot-com sold private-label web-based email services to Radio and TV stations and sports teams. It was the first email provider of its kind to cater specifically to the media. It was later sold in 1999 to a public company.

=== Real estate and other ventures ===
He is the CEO of Devoted Consultants and Aspen Real Estate Company. and is the CEO at everwave.com, the only locally owned ISP and CLEC.

=== Film production ===
Rodriguez was the executive producer of the biographical film jOBS, directed by Joshua Michael Stern and based on the life of Apple co-founder, Steve Jobs. The movie was released in theaters in 2013.

== Political involvement ==
Rodriguez was actively involved in campaign financing in support of Republican candidates from minority groups across the United States. Between 1994 and 1998, he and his wife contributed at least $214,500 to the national campaigns of minority Republican groups and candidates.

In December 1997, Rodriguez founded the American Dream Political Action Committee, an independent political fund, focused primarily on raising funds to support the political activities of "Republican candidates of color", with (now former) Rep. Henry Bonilla as honorary national chairman, and Jeb Henserling (now a U.S. Representative) as treasurer. J.C. Watts, former U.S. Representative in Oklahoma, was also a part of the first PAC team. Rodriguez funded at least $20,000 into this effort during its start-up. Within its first year, the PAC supported twelve minority GOP candidates to a tune of $30,000 in total, from the approximately $100,000 that it was able to raise through it various ventures.

== Community involvement ==
Rodriguez was also head of Turnkey Promotions which, through his radio stations KESS and KSSA, produced some of the largest Hispanic festivals in Texas in the 1980s and 1990s. Some of the festivals he produced include the Fiesta Diez y Seis in Dallas, in commemoration of Mexico's independence, and the Cinco de Mayo celebrations.

The Diez y Seis celebrations held at Texas Stadium featured traditional Mexican dancing and performances by internationally recognized Mexican bands. KESS-AM also puts on a Cinco de Mayo celebration. Mexican artists that have performed at the Cinco de Mayo celebration include Los Bukis and El Impacto de Montemorelos.

In 1999, Rodriguez and his brother Tony donated funds towards the expansion of the Dallas Arboretum and Botanical Garden. After its completion in 2002, the gazebo in the Main Plaza was named after their mother Gisela Rodriguez, who had died in 1997.
