= Red River Radio =

Regional public radio network in the United States

- Headquarters: Shreveport, Louisiana
- Branding: Red River Radio

Programming
- Format: FM/HD1: Public radio HD2: Classical music HD3: NPR News/Talk; HD4: Alternative
- Affiliations: National Public Radio, Public Radio Exchange

Ownership
- Owner: Louisiana State University in Shreveport (Board of Supervisors, Louisiana State University System)
- Sister stations: KDAQ, KLSA, KTYK, KLDN, KBSA, K214CE, KSCL

History
- Launch date: 1985

Links
- Webcast: Main Channel; HD2 Stream; HD3 Stream; HD4 Stream
- Website: redriverradio.org

Red River Radio (RRR) is a regional public radio network for northwest Louisiana, southern Arkansas, eastern Texas, and the southeasternmost corner of Oklahoma, serving communities in the valley of the Red River of the South through five radio stations. The network is headquartered in Shreveport, Louisiana, inside a renovated church building on the campus of Louisiana State University Shreveport on Youree Drive.

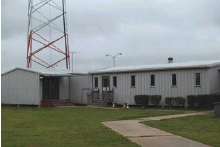
Original location of Red River Radio (former studios and offices of KDAQ), Shreveport, Louisiana

The Red River Radio listening region is one of the largest coverage areas for public radio in the United States.

== Stations ==
Red River Radio consists of six stations and one translator:

Location	Frequency	Call sign	ERP (W)	HAAT	FCC info
Shreveport, Louisiana (flagship)	89.9 FM	KDAQ	100,000 watts	284 meters (932 ft)	FCC (KDAQ)
Alexandria, Louisiana	90.7 FM	KLSA	100,000 watts	379 meters (1,243 ft)	FCC (KLSA)
El Dorado, Arkansas	90.9 FM	KBSA	3,000 watts	179 meters (587 ft)	FCC (KBSA)
Lufkin/Nacogdoches, Texas	88.9 FM	KLDN	50,000 watts	198 meters (650 ft)	FCC (KLDN)
Grambling, Louisiana	90.7 FM	K214CE	105 watts	71 meters (233 ft)	FCC (K214CE)
Overton/Tyler/Longview, Texas	100.7 FM	KTYK	8,100 watts	174 meters (571 ft)	FCC (KTYK)
Shreveport, Louisiana	91.3 FM	KSCL	2,600 watts	58 meters (190 ft)	FCC (KSCL)

== Programming ==
Red River Radio (RRR) is affiliated with National Public Radio and broadcasts many popular NPR programs including Morning Edition, All Things Considered, Fresh Air, World Cafe, Wait Wait... Don't Tell Me, and From the Top. The network also broadcasts many Public Radio Exchange programs including This American Life and To the Point and many programs from American Public Media, including Marketplace Money, Performance Today, and The Splendid Table. Red River Radio broadcasts many independently produced programs such as Art of the Song, Beale Street Caravan, Blues Before Sunrise, Bluegrass Breakdown, Classical Guitar Alive, Hearts of Space, intelligence^{2} Dates, New Orleans All the Way Live, Radiolab, Snap Judgment, With Heart and Voice, and Women in Music.

Red River Radio provides local news weekday mornings during Morning Edition. In 2005, news producer Kate Archer pioneered a community news-gathering effort called the Community Correspondent program in which residents of the community borrow equipment from the network to produce local stories for broadcast during the local newscasts.

Some of the programs aired on RRR are produced locally, at the KDAQ studio. For instance, Wally Derleth hosts Evening Jazz, featuring nights dedicated to big band, contemporary and other subgenres of jazz music. Other locally produced programs include Blues After Hours, hosted by John Ellis and Regional Symphony Broadcasts, hosted by Kermit Poling. A previously-aired local program, Soul Review, dedicated to classic soul and R&B from the 1960s to the 1980s, was hosted by Eric Jenkins from 2008 to 2011.

Numerous local and national contributors provide educational and often compelling commentary at different times during the week. Currently, these short radio segments include A Moment of Science, Get It Growing, Earth and Sky, History Matters, Eco Tech Minute, What Was I Thinking?, Dr. Archie McDonald's Commentary, The Big Picture With Alexandyr Kent, Stardate, and Spotlights.

== Station operation and development ==
Like most public radio stations, RRR is funded primarily by its members. Twice each year, the network conducts a membership campaign pledge drive to pay for programming and ongoing operational costs. For the past several pledge drives, RRR has met or exceeded its membership goals, and at the halfway point through fiscal year 2009 had recorded its best support ever, despite the uncertain economy.

For over two decades, Red River Radio operated out of cramped quarters in a temporary building at the LSUS campus. However, a separate funding campaign was launched in 2007 to construct a new building on campus, that would house production and on-air studios, as well as a small concert hall. Keeping in step with technological advances in broadcasting, RRR was already sending out two of its signals via the new technology called HD Radio, by mid-2007. Currently there are three HD streams for KDAQ. The HD1 stream is a digital version of the regular programming, HD2 is Classical Music, and HD3 has News/Talk with additional programs not found in the regular lineup, allowing for more choices throughout the day and night.

The long-awaited move of the radio station into new facilities, located in a renovated building on the edge of the LSUS campus, was completed on December 5, 2012. The new facilities and studio space of KDAQ were redesigned out of the former Baptist Student Union Building, which also served as a church sanctuary.
