= KLTY =

Radio station in Arlington, Texas

- Arlington, Texas; United States
- Broadcast area: Dallas–Fort Worth metroplex
- Frequency: 94.9 MHz (HD Radio)
- Branding: K-Love

Programming
- Language: English
- Format: Christian adult contemporary
- Subchannels: HD2: Air1; HD3: K-LOVE Eras
- Affiliations: K-Love

Ownership
- Owner: Educational Media Foundation
- Sister stations: KYDA

History
- First air date: 1957 (as KCLE)
- Former call signs: KCLE (1957–1969); KFAD (1969–1972); KAMC (1972–1976); KWJS (1976–1984); KJIM (1984–1985); KLTY (1985–1986); KHYI (1986–1991); KODZ (1991–1992); KSNN (1992–1996); KEWS (1996–1997); KWRD-FM (1997–2000)
- Call sign meaning: “Keep Lovin’ Texas Y’all”

Technical information
- Licensing authority: FCC
- Facility ID: 2809
- Class: C
- ERP: 99,000 watts
- HAAT: 508 meters (1,667 ft)
- Transmitter coordinates: 32°35′22″N 96°58′10″W

Links
- Public license information: Public file; LMS
- Webcast: Listen live Listen Live (HD2); Listen Live (HD3)
- Website: klove.com air1.com (HD2)

KLTY (94.9 FM) is a non-commercial FM radio station licensed to Arlington, Texas, owned and operated by Educational Media Foundation with a transmitter in Cedar Hill. The station carries the Christian Contemporary from K-Love’s network after purchasing from Salem Media Group in late December 2024. K-LOVE was previously heard on KYDA's HD2 sub-channel from March 9, 2024 to March 7, 2025, when it moved to KLTY.

== History ==
KLTY began playing a mix of Adult Contemporary Christian music (CCM). KLTY lasted only from early August 1985 as "Light 95" to late September 1986 when station owner Scott K. Ginsburg changed the call letters to KHYI and changed the format to Top 40 as the moniker "Y-95", marking it one of the two simply "alternative" Top 40 station in the Dallas-Fort Worth metroplex.

Listeners in the far north portion of the metroplex could also receive another Top 40 station, KDSQ-FM, originally licensed in Sherman/Denison (now licensed in Azle), which is a mainstream CHR station in the northern portions of the metroplex, but could be heard only in the Sherman-Denison Metropolitan Area due to the station's class license serving the Texoma region. Despite it didn't nearly reach the metroplex until 1991 when KDSQ's license was upgraded from A to C1 and its transmitter relocated to Azle that year, Y-95 remains the dominant Top 40 station in the metroplex after Dallas's dominant CHR station KTKS and former Top 40 station KAFM/KZPS in 1987 switched their brandings and formats, while its competitor KEGL still marked as its "rock-flavored" Top 40 format. Right when Y-95 launched in September 1986, the station went towards a rhythmic format before becoming mainstream the following year.

Both KEGL and Y-95 were not simply "CHR-dominant" enough as apparently, Y-95's Top 40 format was differently mainstreamed and was sometimes altered on surveys. This would last until late 1987 when KEGL began extremely slowly fading out of its rock-flavored formula and would, in the middle of the following year, switch its format from Rock 40 to CHR after more contemporary titles were added, but when 1989 rolled along, KEGL began to wobble back-and-forward on transitional songs between the two formats. KEGL became more dominant enough in the DFW market after its playlist became more contemporary in 1990.

The transmitter site back then was not at Cedar Hill, the primary antenna farm for Dallas radio, but instead transmitted from Lillian, Texas with 100,000 watts at 1,140 feet. A few years later, KLTY moved to Cedar Hill as a Class C1 station with 36,000 watts at 1,500 feet. A few more stations were rearranged and then KHYI changed to 100,000 watts effective radiated power at 1,508 feet.

Marcos A. Rodriguez was a fan of the original KLTY and saw potential in the format - especially if a radio station could play it 24 hours a day. He purchased the music library from Ginsburg and began planning the conversion of 94.1 to all CCM. However, he was unable to make a deal for the KLTY call letters because they were held by an FM station in Liberty, Missouri (a suburb of Kansas City).

Before it became 94.1 KOJO, the frequency was used by then-sister station KESS. Elfstrand now leads The Morning Ride team at WMBI Chicago.

KOJO was notable for its commitment to being a "full service" radio station, including a solid news commitment. Morning and afternoon drive newscasts were anchored by former KVIL news director Bob Morrison and Calvin Whitman, and later, Dave Tucker. Morrison moved up to a national network news management position as news and sports director of the USA Radio Network, based in Dallas, for 8 1/2 years (until USA was sold and moved to Memphis).

In the spring of 1989, with a free Michael W. Smith concert, Rodriguez created the first Celebrate Freedom-style event and relaunched the KLTY call letters (becoming available when KLTY in Kansas City became KXXR in July 1988). Marcos A. Rodriguez went on to produce Celebrate Freedom festivals at Southfork Ranch and build the event into one of the biggest Christian Music festivals in America. Rodriguez sold KLTY to Sunburst Media L.P. in 1999 for $63.3 million and retired. After the sale of KVIL it was the highest price ever paid for a Dallas FM.

KLTY was on 100.7 MHz from January 2000 to December 2000, and was owned by Sunburst until it was sold to Salem. Salem swapped the Christian talk format that had been on 94.9 for nearly two and a half years known as "The Word", and placed the popular KLTY on a 94.9 signal while "The Word" went to 100.7. This placed the KLTY callsign back on its original frequency.

KLTY now transmits with 100,000 watts ERP from Cedar Hill, Texas.

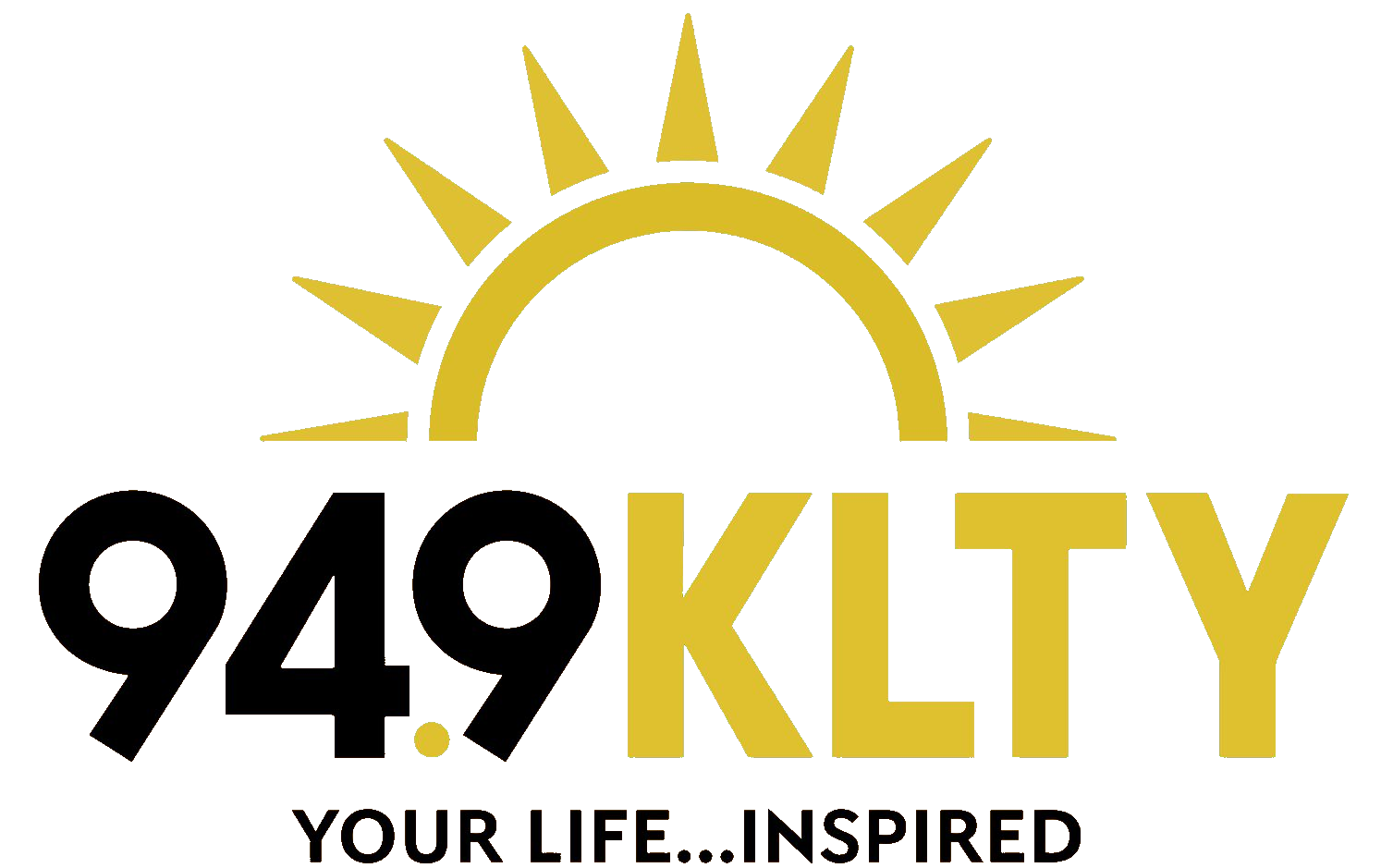
KLTY's final logo as a Salem-owned CCM station

While KLTY plays a Contemporary Christian music playlist, it has been classified as Adult Contemporary (AC) according to Mediabase. KLTY served (and can still serve) as the de facto "AC" station for DFW from mid-2013 to late December 2016 due to CBS Radio-owned 103.7 KVIL contemporizing its playlist to focus on 1990s to current product (with an Adult Top 40 lean) before Mediabase moved the station to "Hot AC" a year later (from October 2016 until February 2017 KVIL was a CHR/Top 40 station. Since November 2017 KVIL broadcasts an Alternative Rock format using the moniker Alt 103.7). As of December 26, 2016, KDGE (102.1) in Fort Worth serves as the official "AC" station for DFW. KLAK (97.5) in Tom Bean, Texas was another "AC" station that served areas north and east of the metroplex until it migrated to a "Hot AC" fare themselves in November 2017.

=== Sale to EMF ===
On December 30, 2024, Salem announced that the company would sell its remaining Contemporary Christian music stations (including KLTY) to Educational Media Foundation (EMF), the parent company of radio networks K-Love and Air1. EMF's area station KYDA (101.7 FM) is currently affiliated with the latter feed. Salem cited the reason behind the sales was to pay off the company's debt. The sale closed on February 1, 2025. KLTY staff informed their listeners of the upcoming changes, and aired special programming for its final day on January 31. On February 1, at midnight, after playing "Friends 2003" by Michael W. Smith, KLTY switched to K-Love, with "Praise" by Elevation Worship being the first song played. The sale to KLTY and to non-commercial was consummated on April 9, 2025.

== History of 94.9 FM ==
The 94.9 frequency has a rich history, long predating the current format and ownership. KCLE was established in 1949 in Cleburne, Texas, by owners Jim Gordon and George Marti on 94.3 MHz. Marti was later the inventor of microwave transmitters (known as "Marti Units.") Employees included notables such as Russ Bloxom (later news anchor at WBAP/KXAS-TV,) Don Harris (personality at WBAP (AM)) and Mike Ambrose (later with KLIF, and a San Diego TV weatherman for 28 years.) The station moved to 94.9 in 1957.

In 1960, Gordon and Marti ended their partnership; Marti continued Marti Electronics, Inc. and Gordon, the AM and FM. In the mid-sixties KCLE (AM) was sold to Earle Fletcher (manager of KXOL Ft. Worth and concurrently owner of KBAN Bowie). Gordon flipped the FM to KFAD, with an underground/progressive rock format. Notables included Jon Dillon (now at KZPS), writer Phillip Cook, Dave Thomas and Joe Nick Patoski (later the senior editor of Texas Monthly magazine.

On January 1, 1972, Dick Osburn took ownership of the station, and reimaged it as KAMC ("K-Mac") while continuing the underground music format. By 1974, the format flipped to "Progressive Country" when former KFAD talent Biff Big Johnson convinced Dick Osburn and Program Director Ken Bateman to mix country and rock with a show called "The Country Sunday". It worked so well that the station dropped the underground rock and became the first 24-hour Progressive Country station in America. Biff had been the first jock when KSCS went Country the year before. KAMC was the only station in Dallas - Ft. Worth to play Outlaw Country artists like Willie Nelson and Waylon Jennings. A notable employee of KAMC was Bill Merrill, who did play-by-play for the Texas Rangers.

On June 19, 1976, with the station now licensed to Arlington, it was sold to Jimmy Swaggart Ministries and became KWJS (the Word of Jimmy Swaggart) and to new KJIM calls in 1984. (The KJIM calls were resurrected from KJIM-870 AM, who used them from 1957 to 1984.)

After the first incarnation of KLTY (1985–86) and then KHYI (1986–91) (which aired a Top 40 format, first as "Y95", then "Power 95"), 94.9 was home to KODZ "Oldies 94.9", starting on October 28, 1991. After one year, it flipped to classic country as KSNN "Sunny 95" at 12:11 p.m. on October 12, 1992. It then flipped to KEWS - "The First All-News FM Station in America, Made in Texas" on February 27, 1996. Religious talker KWRD was established at 94.9 on January 11, 1997, after a trade with KEWS-FM. As a result of the trade, KDFX/1190 AM became KWRD-FM, while KEWS-FM became KOOO/1190 AM.

== On-air staff ==
Notable weekday hosts included Bonnie and Jeremiah in the morning, middays with Tony Lopez, afternoons with Dave Moore, and nights with Penny. Traffic was covered on morning and afternoon drive by Gail Lightfoot before retiring in 2020. Saturdays included Marc Anderson, Maryrose, Ben Bradshaw, and Kally. Sundays included Frank Reed and Ben Bradshaw.

On June 10, 2024, KLTY parted ways with Starlene Stringer and John Hudson, the former morning hosts. Bonnie Curry moved from afternoons to morning, while Dave Moore took over the afternoon slot.

== Awards and recognition ==
For years KLTY has been one of the leading radio stations in America. The National Association of Broadcasters has awarded KLTY a Marconi Award for being a "Top Major Market Station Of the Year" in 2005, 2007, 2009, and 2012. In 2014 and 2016 KLTY was awarded the Marconi Award for "Religious Station of the Year".

In 2004 KLTY earned the GMA Awards for Major Market Station of the Year and the Music Station of the Year award from National Religious Broadcasters.

KLTY has the highest number of listeners for a radio station in the Adult CCM format. According to figures produced from the Arbitron survey released in 2013, KLTY now boasts more than a million listeners.

== KLTY HD channels ==
As of February 1, 2025, The Primary HD Channel broadcasts KLOVE.

=== HD2 ===
KLTY's secondary channel (HD2) was initially launched as a simulcast of KLTY with a 60-second delay for signal testing. Days later, it was a simulcast of KWRD-FM "The Word". On June 5, 2018, it started airing Spanish Contemporary Christian music as "El Pez" (translates to "The Fish" in Spanish). In November 2023, it simulcasted conservative talk-formatted KSKY "The Answer" which had previously been available on its HD3 channel. On April 5, to 22, 2025, both sub-channels were silent in preparation for ownership K-LOVE to air their sub channels across the selected cities. The next day, Its HD2 is Air1 sister station KYDA, for signal being northern transmitter weak in Downtown Dallas and Dallas southeast of its cities.

=== HD3 ===
KLTY's third channel (HD3) used to simulcast KWRD-FM. As of April 23, 2025, it is broadcasting K-LOVE Eras.

Both HD sub-channels continued to broadcast Salem Media content until April 5, 2025, when it got silenced until April 23, 2025.
