= KYDA =

Radio station in Azle, Texas

- Azle, Texas; United States
- Broadcast area: Fort Worth–Gainesville–Bowie–Decatur–Sherman–Jacksboro–Ardmore
- Frequency: 101.7 MHz (HD Radio)
- Branding: Air1

Programming
- Language: English
- Format: Christian worship
- Subchannels: HD2: Air1 Música De Adoración; HD3: Radio Nueva Vida
- Network: Air1

Ownership
- Owner: Educational Media Foundation
- Sister stations: KLTY

History
- First air date: June 29, 1967
- Former call signs: KDSX-FM (1967–1977); KDSQ (1977–1995); KDVE (1995–1997); KIKM (1997–1999); KZMP (1999–2003); KTCY (2003–2013)
- Call sign meaning: Your Dallas Station

Technical information
- Licensing authority: FCC
- Facility ID: 28122
- Class: C
- ERP: 92,000 watts
- HAAT: 620 meters
- Transmitter coordinates: 33.437°N 97.485°W
- Translator: 100.5 K263AK (Wichita Falls)

Links
- Public license information: Public file; LMS
- Webcast: Listen live; HD2: Listen live; HD3: Listen live
- Website: www.air1.com; HD3: www.nuevavida.com

KYDA (101.7 FM) is a radio station based in the Fort Worth, Texas, area of the United States, and is the local outlet of EMF's Air1 network, airing a Christian worship format. The station is licensed to Azle, Texas, with a transmitter site located north of Decatur, Texas. It is owned by Educational Media Foundation. Air1 is a Christian worship music radio network in the United States.

== History ==
=== Early beginnings ===
For the first three decades in operation, KDSX-FM was licensed for Denison–Sherman beginning on June 29, 1967. In late 1976, B.V. Hammond, Jr. and Lofton L. Hendrick sold the station to Grayson County Broadcasters, Inc., which sold the station the next year to Radiozark Broadcasters. As Radiozark did not buy its sister-station KDSX, it changed the callsign to KDSQ. The station ran a longtime automated Top 40/CHR format under the branding "Q102". The "Q102" name was unrelated to KTXQ in the Dallas–Fort Worth metroplex, which was Dallas–Fort Worth's rock station at the time, also named Q102. However, in the first part of the 1980s, while it competed against KIKM, the stations had a very different sound and orientation. KIKM was very mainstream, with live DJs and a heavy commercial load, while KDSQ was automated, with an adult-leaning playlist (but still mostly contains mainstream titles) and lower commercial loads. During this period, the programming was supplied by TM Productions, and the station carried the TM Stereo Rock format (which was not a rock format despite the name, but rather was an adult-friendly Top 40 format). At the time, both KDSQ and KDSX were operated by Mahaffey Enterprises Incorporated. Despite being automated, KDSQ was also affiliated with ABC's Contemporary and Information networks. After KIKM dropped its Top 40 format in 1986, KDSQ became the only Top 40/CHR station in the Red River region and the Sherman/Denison/Durant area. In its last few years as an automated station, KDSQ switched its on-air identification from "Q102" to "Power 102" in February 1988 with its slogan "The Most Hit Music For Texomaland". At the same time, the station began airing Casey Kasem's American Top 40. The station was still automated and the music mix was essentially unchanged.

In 1990, it dropped the automated Top 40 format (which was a successor to the TM Stereo Rock format, since TM Productions had left the syndicated format business and sold off that portion of its business during the mid-1980s) in favor of a satellite-delivered Top 40 format called "The Heat" from Satellite Music Network. The apparent reason for this change was that the tape automation equipment that KDSQ was using for the previous format was getting worn out and would have needed replacement, so it was easier to switch to a satellite-delivered format than it was to replace the tape automation equipment. The new format was much higher energy than the previous format had been, with live DJs, a heavier emphasis on new music, and a generally less adult-friendly approach. As such, it was not well received by local advertisers and struggled when it came to attracting advertising dollars.

In the 1990s, KDSQ made a series of technical improvements, changing from class A to C3 in October 1991 and becoming a full class C station wit 92 kW ERP from a transmitter northeast of Decatur in 1999. These improvements allowed the station to enter the Dallas-Fort Worth radio market

The station changed calls and formats multiple times throughout the 1990s. The station dropped its longtime CHR format in early 1993 and flipped to a country format but it only lasted for a few months. In July of that same year, both KDSQ and oldies station KTCY split formats. The split led KDSQ to flip to a hot adult contemporary format but downgraded towards a gold-based adult contemporary format a short time later. In late 1994, KDSQ dropped AC and flipped to a format that played a lot of classic rock, although it wasn't a pure classic rock format because it did play some current music and leaned a little more towards pop music than was typical of classic rock stations. This format didn't last long, as it received little advertiser support. Once this format was dropped, the stations briefly reverted to an automated Top 40 format that included some gold. And while that format did attract some advertisers, the station during this period was afflicted with technical problems that resulted in the station operating with drastically reduced power much of the time, as well as frequently broadcasting with the left and right channels out of phase. After a short stint in January 1995, the station went silent and was sold to new owners. A few months later, the station returned on the air and became KDVE with a soft adult contemporary format in mid-1995. In 1997, KDVE became KIKM-FM and flipped to a country station competing against KMKT, and two years later in 1999, the station became KZMP and changed its format to Spanish. Entravision Communications bought Z Spanish Media in 1999, resulting in its acquisition of KZMP. The callsign changed again in 2003, to KTCY.

Liberman Broadcasting bought some of Entravision's radio assets on August 4, 2006, and relaunched KTCY "Concierto 101.7" as XO 101.7, retaining the same Spanish-language pop music but with different DJs and programming. The station moved toward a more romantic sound beginning in 2009.

In early 2012, KTCY briefly returned to Latin pop as "Baila 101.7" (Baila is Spanish for "dance"). It competed for head-on with CBS Radio-owned KMVK and Univision Radio-owned KDXX. "Baila 101.7" broadcast music Sunday through Friday for a full 24 hours, but aired infomercials on Saturday mornings. The station ran jockless throughout its short tenure.

=== Acquisition by EMF ===
It was announced on November 5, 2012, that Educational Media Foundation, owner of the K-Love and Air1 networks, would expand to the Dallas–Fort Worth area by purchasing KTCY from Liberman for $6 million. As CBS Radio's classic hits station KLUV used the "K-Love" branding in the Dallas/Fort Worth market at the time, it was assumed that the station would take Air1 to avoid confusion. (Note: EMF acquired the Dallas–Fort Worth rights to the "K-Love" name from CBS Radio successor Audacy, Inc., in 2023, and would bring the K-Love network to the market on KLTY in 2025.) On February 8, the station went off the air to make way for EMF's takeover. EMF reserved the callsign KYDA for the Air1 format that launched at 4 p.m. on February 12, 2013.

== Signal ==
Unlike most of the area's FM stations like sister station KLTY, which transmit their signals from Cedar Hill, KYDA transmits its signal from an unincorporated area within the county borders of Cooke, Montague, and Wise. Therefore, KYDA's signal is much stronger in the Northwestern parts of the Dallas/Fort Worth metroplex as well as the cities of Decatur, Bowie, Gainesville, and Sherman, to as far north as Ardmore, Oklahoma, but is considerably weaker in Dallas and areas Southeast of the city itself.
