= KFZO =

Radio station in Denton, Texas

Coordinates: 33.390°N 97.565°W

- Denton, Texas; United States
- Broadcast area: Dallas–Fort Worth metroplex
- Frequency: 99.1 MHz
- Branding: 99.1 La Preferida

Programming
- Language: Spanish
- Format: Regional Mexican
- Affiliations: Dallas Mavericks

Ownership
- Owner: Latino Media Network; (Latino Media Network, LLC)
- Sister stations: KFLC

History
- First air date: December 1988
- Former call signs: KWDC (1987–1988); KJZY (1988–1992); KDZR (1992–1995); KHCK (1995–2004); KFZO (2004–2012); KDXX (2012–2016)
- Call sign meaning: "Zona MX" ( Former Branding)

Technical information
- Licensing authority: FCC
- Facility ID: 7040
- Class: C
- ERP: 100,000 watts
- HAAT: 356 meters (1,168 ft)

Links
- Public license information: Public file; LMS
- Webcast: Listen live (via iHeartRadio)

KFZO (99.1 FM) is a commercial radio station licensed to the city of Denton, Texas, serving the Dallas–Fort Worth metroplex. The station airs a regional Mexican radio format and is owned and operated by Latino Media Network. The station's studios and offices are located in the Univision building at the Plaza Of The Americas in the City Center District of Dallas. The station is an affiliate of the Dallas Mavericks Spanish Language Radio Network.

KFZO has an effective radiated power (ERP) of 100,000 watts, the maximum for non-grandfathered FM stations. The transmitter is off County Road 2560 in Alvord in Wise County.

KFZO is not licensed by the FCC to broadcast in the HD (digital hybrid) format.

== History ==
The station began signed on as KWDC on September 15, 1988. It played jazz and was owned by Denton FM Radio, Ltd. Less than a month after the station went on the air, owners Bill Mercer and Fred Graham sold it to Larry Greene, who bought it for $6 million. Greene changed the call sign to KJZY ("Jazzy 99.1"). In 1991, KJZY made an unusual move for a commercial station, developing "Operation Jazzy" to help save the station's unique format by soliciting listener donations. Some $25,000 was raised, which was only a small portion of the needed $150,000. By December, the station went dark and was sold.

In December 1992, the station went back on the air as KDZR ("Z-Rock 99.1 FM"), playing heavy metal rock from ABC Radio Network's Z Rock satellite feed, which was based in Dallas. It was then purchased by Marcos A. Rodriguez on February 1, 1995. It flipped to KHCK ("99.1 Kick FM"), airing tejano music. The station was also simulcast on 107.9 MHz.

In 2004, the station was then sold to Hispanic Broadcasting (later becoming Univision Radio). Less than a year later, the station changed names and formats to KFZO as a cumbia music station. A short time later, Univision switched it to a reggaeton format, calling the station "La Kalle" (Spanish for "The Street").

On February 19, 2009, the Regional Mexican format known as "La Que Buena" was moved from 107.9 FM (KESS-FM) to 99.1 and was simulcast on 107.1 FM (KFZO). The reggaeton station known as "Radio La Kalle" was then moved to 107.9 FM and retooled its format to latin pop where it remained until late 2011.

In early 2011, its sister station KDXX (now KFZO) broke away from the "La Jefa" simulcast.

On June 28, 2012, KFZO changed its format to Spanish adult contemporary music, branded as "Máxima 99.1" and switching call sign to KDXX.

On July 29, 2013, KDXX started simulcasting on KFZO 107.1.

In September 2014, the "Máxima" branding was changed to "Latino Mix 99.1 & 107.1" and retooled to a latin pop format.

On February 17, 2016, Univision swapped call signs and formats once again on 99.1 and 107.9, marking the return of the callsign KFZO to 99.1 FM. A day later, 99.1 returned to its current regional Mexican format as "La Jefa." The La Jefa branding only lasted a year before the station switched to "ZonaMX."

On June 3, 2022, TelevisaUnivision is selling its 18 radio stations, including all of its radio assets in Fresno, McAllen, and Las Vegas, to newly founded media company Latino Media Network, for $60 million. This also included both KFZO and sister station KFLC into the market agreement.

In November 2022, The FCC had accepted the agreement, and had a deal for Univision to operate for one year, or the rest of 2023, which was made for both companies, until they give full control to LMN at the end of 2023. The 18 Univision radio stations, including KFZO and KFLC, were currently owned by Latino Media Network and operated by Uforia Audio Network under a programming service agreement. LMN took over operations of both stations by the end of October 2023.

KFZO logo as "Zona MX" (2016 - 2026)

On October 31st, The station branding changed from "Zona MX 99.1" to "99.1 La Preferida" still playing Regional Mexican Music with more music and less interruption.

== Signal ==
Unlike most of the area's FM stations which transmit their signals from Cedar Hill, KFZO transmits its signal from an unincorporated area East-Northeast of Alvord. Therefore, KFZO's signal is much stronger in the Northwestern parts of the Dallas/Fort Worth metroplex as well as the cities of Decatur, Bowie, Gainesville, and Sherman, but is considerably weaker in Dallas and areas Southeast of the city itself.
