= KTNO (Plano, Texas) =

Radio station in Plano, Texas

Coordinates: 33°14′34.4″N 96°32′30″W

- Plano, Texas; United States
- Broadcast area: Dallas–Fort Worth metroplex
- Frequency: 620 kHz
- Branding: The Word 100.7

Programming
- Language: English
- Format: Christian talk and teaching

Ownership
- Owner: Salem Media Group; (Inspiration Media of Texas, LLC)

History
- First air date: July 15, 1939
- Last air date: April 13, 2026
- Former call signs: KWFT (1939–1995); KAAM (1995–1998); KMKI (1998–2015); KEXB (2015–2019)
- Call sign meaning: Was adopted with a Tejano format on February 1, 1993, at what is now KAMM

Technical information
- Licensing authority: FCC
- Facility ID: 49320
- Class: B
- Power: 5,000 watts (day); 4,500 watts (night)
- Translator: (102.5 MHz) K273BJ (Dallas)

Links
- Public license information: Public file; LMS

KTNO (620 kHz) was a commercial AM radio station licensed to Plano, Texas, United States, which served the Dallas–Fort Worth metroplex. The station aired a simulcast of Christian talk and teaching formatted station KWRD-FM "The Word" and was owned by the Salem Media Group. Studios and offices were on North Belt Line Road in Irving.

KTNO was powered at 5,000 watts by day and 4,500 watts at night. It used a directional antenna with a four-tower array to protect other stations on 620 AM from interference. The transmitter was on County Road 409 in McKinney. Programming was also heard on 250-watt FM translator K273BJ at 102.5 MHz in Dallas.

This station began as KWFT in Wichita Falls, Texas, in 1939 and was one of that city's major radio stations and an affiliate of the CBS Radio Network. It established KWFT-TV (channel 6), now KAUZ-TV, in 1953. In the mid-1990s, the facility was moved toward the Metroplex as KAAM, broadcasting from Plano. As KMKI, it aired programming from Radio Disney, which at one time was based in Dallas, from 1998 to 2014. When Radio Disney moved off broadcast radio stations, it was sold to Salem Media Group and inherited Salem's local business news format, previously heard on KVCE, as KEXB. In 2019, the station took on the KTNO call sign and Spanish-language Christian radio format, Radio Luz, previously heard on 1440 kHz when Salem sold the frequency. Radio Luz shut down in October 2025, and the facility rebroadcast KWRD-FM until it was closed in April 2026.

== History ==
=== KWFT in Wichita Falls (1939–1994) ===
The station originally had its start in Wichita Falls, Texas, as KWFT. It signed on in 1939 on 620 kHz and broadcast in Wichita Falls until 1994. KWFT was the first radio station to continuously operate in the city and was a regional channel that could be heard across a large geographical area of Texas and Oklahoma during the daytime. The station was an affiliate of the CBS Radio Network.

On December 19, 1947, the Federal Communications Commission approved the sale of KWFT from Mr. and Mrs. Joe P. Carrigan, Laura Lou Carrigan and Mrs. Elizabeth Carrigan Simpson to Edward H. Rowley, H.J. Griffith and Kenyon Brown, operating as KWFT, Incorporated.

In 1953, KWFT joined other radio stations in the United States by plunging into the new medium of television. KWFT-TV signed on the air on March 1 and was the first television station in the Wichita Falls. Just as its AM counterpart was a CBS radio affiliate, KWFT-TV was an affiliate of the CBS television network. KWFT sold the TV station in 1956 at which time it became KSYD-TV and later KAUZ-TV in 1963, continuing as the CBS affiliate for the Wichita Falls-Lawton market.

KWFT Radio focused on local and national news, weather, farm reports and middle of the road music. However, as FM radio became more popular for music listening in the 1980s, it cut into KWFT's audience and advertising dollars, leading to the sale of the station in the mid-1990s to a new owner who had other plans for the station. KWFT signed off at 11:59 p.m. on December 24, 1994.

=== Move to Dallas ===
About two years later, the 620 frequency formerly licensed to Wichita Falls returned to the airwaves licensed to Plano, a suburb in the Dallas-Fort Worth Metroplex. The new call sign was KAAM. It was owned by Collin County Radio L.C. and it aired an adult standards format in AM stereo.

KAAM was sold to The Walt Disney Company for $12 million and switched to a children's radio format from the Radio Disney network on August 1, 1998. KAAM was renamed KMKI (for Mickey Mouse). In 2005, KMKI discontinued broadcasting in AM stereo. Until Radio Disney's move from Dallas to Burbank, California, KMKI was the network's flagship station.

In May 2014, Mediabase moved KMKI, along with other Radio Disney stations, to the contemporary hit radio panel, even though Radio Disney was considered a children's radio station.

On August 13, 2014, Disney put KMKI and 22 other Radio Disney stations up for sale, to focus on digital distribution of the Radio Disney network. KMKI's affiliation was scheduled to be discontinued on or after September 26, but Disney decided to keep the programming on KMKI until it found a buyer.

KMKI had a license to broadcast a digital signal using iBiquity's "HD Radio" but suspended transmission in the months before the sale announcement. Because the license to broadcast digital "HD Radio" was perpetual, the station could resume digital broadcasts at any time. However, the HD signal was never reactivated.

=== Sale to Salem ===
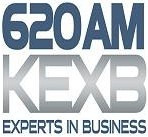
620AM KEXB logo used from 2015 until 2019.

On June 5, 2015, the Salem Media Group announced it would acquire KMKI for $3 million. The station was sold to Salem on September 15, 2015. As a result, the station discontinued its Radio Disney programming and went dark on September 12, 2015. KMKI returned to the air on September 18, 2015, simulcasting the Christian radio programming of sister station KWRD-FM. On September 25, 2015, KMKI began simulcasting co-owned KVCE, broadcasting a business and financial news/talk format. On October 1, 2015, KMKI changed its call letters to KEXB (standing for Experts in Business), and took over the business news/talk format from KVCE. Radio Disney programming for the region later moved to KLUV's HD3 digital subchannel after a seven-month absence from the radio market.

KEXB carried syndicated radio shows such as Bloomberg Radio and Ray Lucia. It also aired brokered programming from financial planners who paid for time on the station and advertised their services. SRN News began most hours.

In 2019, Salem announced it would sell co-owned KTNO (1440 AM) to Catholic broadcaster Immaculate Heart Media, Inc. On October 21, 2019, Salem discontinued its financial news/talk format on AM 620 and moved its Spanish Christian format known as "Radio Luz" from KTNO to KEXB. In addition, KEXB's call sign was switched to KTNO, while the KEXB call letters were warehoused on the former KTNO. Shortly thereafter, KTNO signed on translator K273BJ on 102.5 MHz.

On October 21, 2025, Salem had announced that "Radio Luz" would cease operations at the end of the month. KTNO staff also confirmed the news on their Facebook page. After "Radio Luz" aired their final programs and KTNO station personnel said their farewells, KTNO returned to a simulcast of KWRD-FM on November 1, 2025.

On April 10, 2026, Salem Media requested the cancellation of the KTNO license, ending nearly 87 years of broadcasting. K273BJ now relays conservative talk sister KSKY. The license was cancelled on April 13.
