= KSCL =

Radio station in Shreveport, Louisiana

Coordinates: 32.481°N 93.731°W

- Shreveport, Louisiana; United States
- Broadcast area: Shreveport–Bossier City metropolitan area
- Frequency: 91.3 MHz

Programming
- Language: English
- Format: Alternative rock

Ownership
- Owner: Red River Radio (LSUS)

History
- First air date: March 19, 1976
- Call sign meaning: "Sentenary [sic] College of Louisiana" (Note: It is said that this was the result of a typo. However, at the time the KSCL call letters were assigned to the Centenary station, the KCCL call letters were assigned elsewhere, to 1460 kHz in Paris, Arkansas.)

Technical information
- Licensing authority: FCC
- Facility ID: 9758
- Class: A
- ERP: 2,600 watts
- HAAT: 56 meters

Links
- Public license information: Public file; LMS
- Website: www.centenary.edu/student-affairs/student-activities/student-publications-media/

KSCL (91.3 FM) is an alternative rock radio station broadcasting from the campus of Centenary College of Louisiana in Shreveport, Louisiana, United States. Branded as “Alt Red River,” the station broadcasts 24 hours a day to Shreveport, Bossier City, and other surrounding communities. It is simulcast on Red River Radio 's HD Radio channel -4 across its six stations in Louisiana, Texas, and Arkansas.

KSCL went on the air in March 1976 after two and a half years of construction. The low-wattage station received power increases in 1981 and 2006. In May 2023, Centenary filed to sell the station to Louisiana State University Shreveport, owner of the regional Red River Radio public radio service.

== History ==
Dr. Webb Pomeroy, chairman of the Communications Committee, first proposed the idea of "Centenary Radio" in 1972. In October 1973, the college received a construction permit from the Federal Communications Commission (FCC) to build KSCL. Construction moved slowly as equipment was obtained from local radio and television stations and financing delayed the arrival of further necessary pieces. The student newspaper, The Conglomerate, wrote in January 1975, "Several months ago The Conglomerate was told that only two more weeks were needed. We're waiting." Work significantly accelerated in 1975 after the original station manager resigned; Doug Stewart, an engineer for KSLA television, began to supervise the engineering and construction tasks involved in getting the station built.

Four and a half years later, KSCL went live on March 19, 1976. The first station manager and co-builder of the station was Jay Reynolds. Reynolds said that KSCL would be "alternative" and "like no other station in Shreveport" and hoped that it would become as significant to community relations as Centenary basketball had been; the station's record library contained 120 albums including several pounds of what Reynolds called "worthless 45s".

In October 1981, KSCL's effective radiated power was upgraded from 10 watts to 150 watts, increasing its coverage area. The change had been delayed more than 18 months because the first transmitter purchased was found to be defective. By that time, KSCL was offering programming for nine hours a day. A 1987 attempt by some in student government to change the station's format to one more attuned to the popular tastes of students failed to materialize when a poll about proposed formats proved inconclusive and many student volunteers threatened to quit if the station's music mix were changed.

Expansion was a topic at KSCL in the late 1990s and 2000s. A study conducted for the college in the mid-1990s indicated that the station needed a wider reach; it had been broadcast from an antenna on the Student Union Building. The grandfather of one of KSCL's DJs at the time donated a tower that had been used at one of his company's oil fields. The proposal was ultimately rejected because the college announced, but never followed through on, plans to build new production studios for radio and television.

In 1999, local public radio station Red River Radio, a service of Louisiana State University Shreveport (LSUS), proposed to start a station sharing 12 hours of time on the 91.3 frequency with its own call letters. The students and office of development clashed over the issue; students presented a petition with more than 300 signatures against a potential sharing of KSCL with Red River Radio. Red River Radio presented a revised proposal, which was accepted by Centenary; the two announced a sharing of the 91.3 frequency with a new Red River Radio station, with its own call letters, in January 2000. Red River Radio would have programmed NPR and Public Radio International programs from midnight to noon, with KSCL continuing from noon to midnight. The proposal languished at the FCC and was later abandoned.

In 2006, KSCL expanded its broadcasting range to reach most of Caddo Parish and surrounding parishes.

In May 2023, Centenary College proposed to sell the station to LSUS in exchange for underwriting messages for five years on Red River Radio, identification of KSCL as having been "founded by Centenary College", and provision for Centenary students to be involved in its operation for at least 10 years.

In Spring 2024, Red River Radio switched KSCL to adult album alternative with programming from WXPN’s XPoNential Radio service. Red River Radio also simulcasted the programming on the HD4 subchannels of the other stations in their network.

KSCL flipped back to a locally programmed alternative rock format as “Alt Red River” in Spring 2025 Red River Radio simulcasts KSCL on the HD4 subchannels of its other stations.
