= KSKY =

Radio station in Balch Springs, Texas

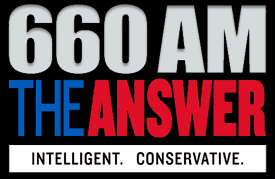
- Balch Springs, Texas; United States
- Broadcast area: Dallas–Fort Worth metroplex
- Frequency: 660 kHz
- Branding: 660 AM The Answer

Programming
- Format: Conservative talk radio
- Affiliations: Compass Media Networks; Radio America; Salem Radio Network; Townhall Radio News

Ownership
- Owner: Salem Media Group; (Bison Media, Inc.)
- Sister stations: KWRD-FM

History
- First air date: September 28, 1941
- Call sign meaning: Former slogan: "From the skyroof of the Hotel Stoneleigh"

Technical information
- Licensing authority: FCC
- Facility ID: 6591
- Class: B
- Power: 7,200 watts (day); 600 watts (night)
- Transmitter coordinates: 33°02′26.4″N 96°56′45″W

Links
- Public license information: Public file; LMS
- Webcast: Listen Live
- Website: 660amtheanswer.com

KSKY (660 AM) is a commercial radio station licensed to Balch Springs, Texas, and serving the Dallas–Fort Worth metroplex. It is owned by the Salem Media Group and broadcasts a conservative talk radio format.

KSKY broadcasts by day at 7,200 watts. Because AM 660 is a clear channel frequency reserved for WFAN in New York City, KSKY must reduce power at night to 600 watts. It uses a directional antenna at all times. The transmitter is on Huffines Boulevard at Stonewall Drive in Lewisville, Texas.

As of August 2026, programming is also simulcast on 92.9 (no call letters) in Dallas and is operating under an “emergency” Special Temporary Authorization (STA) granted by the FCC in 2008, due to claims of nighttime Mexican interference on 660 AM. This was granted with the stipulation that, “in the event any of the FM translator stations proposed in the pending applications become operational, the emergency KSKY(AM) FM repeater station specified herein will be required to immediately cease operation.”

KSKY was also briefly simulcasting on 102.5 K273BJ in Dallas after the cancellation of 620 KTNO’s license in April 2026. The 102.5 translator has since been acquired by First Media Dallas and is airing 90.9 KCBI’s All Teaching Channel, which is being fed by 90.9 KCBI HD2.

== Programming ==
KSKY airs mostly nationally syndicated conservative talk hosts on its weekday schedule. One local program is heard in morning drive time, hosted by Mark Davis. The rest of the line up includes Hugh Hewitt, Mike Gallagher, Dennis Prager, Eric Metaxas, Charlie Kirk, Jay Sekulow, Sebastian Gorka, Josh Hammer, and This Morning, America's First News with Gordon Deal.

Weekends feature shows on money and health, some of which are paid brokered programming. There are also repeats of weekday shows. Most hours begin with world and national news from co-owned Townhall Radio News.

== History ==
On September 28, 1941, KSKY first signed on. It was owned by the Chilton Radio Corp. In 1963, Chilton sold KSKY. Prior to the sale, it flipped to a Christian format, which aired until 2004 when it made the switch to conservative talk. For much of the station's existence, it was phonetically branded as K-Sky.

KSKY was sold to Salem in mid-2000. KSKY was also originally a daytime-only station until the recent format change and city of license change from Dallas to Balch Springs. KSKY applied for an FM frequency at 106.9 in 1948, then turned down a chance to buy the 98.7 frequency in 1957, and was awarded 91.3 in the 1960s (but no proof that it ever signed on has ever been found, with 91.3 has become a part of the non-commercial band.)

During the station's early days, notables such as Jackie Gleason, Skitch Henderson, Vincent Price, Jane Russell, Jack Webb and Charlton Heston visited the station in person and performed live on KSKY.

Salem Media announced on May 29, 2012, that KSKY would be rebranded as The Answer, with the return of radio personality Mark Davis (previously on WBAP). Salem Communications Corporation’s Director of Spoken Word Format Phil Boyce explained the reason for the rebranding: “This station will truly be an answer for so many things going on in the Metroplex and the world, with smart hosts who know how to help you understand all of those things, not to mention great news, traffic, weather, and information.” Most sister stations with similar conservative talk programming in Salem's portfolio were also eventually rebranded as "The Answer".

On January 1, 2014, KSKY began airing the Sean Hannity show 2–5 pm CT, in a move also from crosstown WBAP.
