= WBAP =

WBAP could refer to:

- WBAP (AM), a radio station (820 AM) licensed to Fort Worth, Texas, United States
- WBAP-FM, a radio station (93.3 FM) licensed to Haltom City, Texas, United States
- KSCS, a radio station licensed to Fort Worth, Texas, United States; formerly WBAP-FM from 1949 to 1973
- KTCK-FM, a radio station (96.7 FM) licensed to Flower Mound, Texas, United States; formerly WBAP-FM from 2010 to 2013
- KXAS-TV, a television station licensed to Fort Worth, Texas, United States; formerly named WBAP-TV from 1948 to 1974
