= KLIF (AM) =

Radio station in Dallas

- Dallas, Texas; United States
- Broadcast area: Dallas–Fort Worth metroplex
- Frequency: 570 kHz
- Branding: News and Information 570 KLIF

Programming
- Language: English
- Format: News/talk
- Affiliations: Fox News Radio; Compass Media Networks; Premiere Networks; Radio America; Westwood One

Ownership
- Owner: Cumulus Media; (KLIF Lico, LLC)
- Sister stations: KPLX; KSCS; KTCK; KTCK-FM; WBAP; WBAP-FM

History
- First air date: June 26, 1922
- Former call signs: KGKO (1938–1947); WFAA/WBAP (1947–1970); WFAA (1970–1983); KRQX (1983–1987); KLDD (1987–1990); KKWM (1990)
- Call sign meaning: From its time on 1190 AM for Dallas' Oak Cliff neighborhood

Technical information
- Licensing authority: FCC
- Facility ID: 35061
- Class: B
- Power: 5,000 watts day; 2,400 watts night
- Transmitter coordinates: 32°56′41.4″N 96°56′26″W
- Repeater: 96.3 KSCS-HD2 (Fort Worth)

Links
- Public license information: Public file; LMS
- Webcast: Listen live
- Website: www.klif.com

KLIF (570 kHz) is a commercial AM radio station licensed to Dallas, Texas. The station is owned by Cumulus Media and broadcasts a news/talk format to the Dallas-Fort Worth Metroplex. The studios are in the Victory Park district in Dallas, just north of downtown.

KLIF broadcasts with 5,000 watts by day, but decreases its power to 2,400 watts at night to protect other stations on 570 kHz. Its transmitter site is shared with co-owned KTCK, on Ledbetter Road in Irving. It uses a directional antenna at all times, with a two-tower array. Programming is also heard on the HD Radio digital subchannel of co-owned 96.3 KSCS-HD2.

KLIF is one of the two talk stations owned by Cumulus in the Dallas Metroplex. The simulcast of WBAP and WBAP-FM has mostly local hosts while much of KLIF's schedule is made up of nationally syndicated talk shows. KLIF's sole local weekday program is a morning news and interview show hosted by Clayton Neville and Sybil Summers. The rest of the day, KLIF carries Markley, Van Camp, & Robbins, The Brian Kilmeade Show, The Sean Hannity Show, Fox Across America with Jimmy Failla, Rich Valdés America at Night and Coast to Coast AM with George Noory. Weekends include shows on money, health, gardening, home repair and cars, as well as brokered programming. Syndicated weekend hosts include Dana Loesch and Bill Cunningham. Most hours begin with Fox News Radio.

== Station history ==
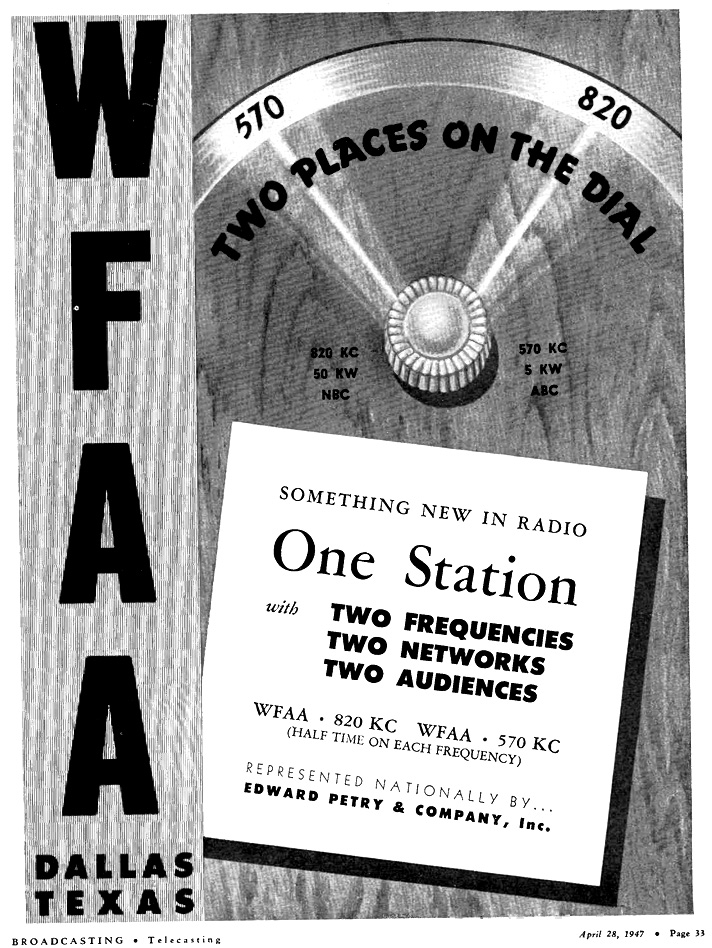
From 1947 until 1970, WFAA alternated between 570 and 820 kHz with WBAP.

=== Early years ===
The history of KLIF can be traced back to two stations: WFAA in Dallas, which signed on in 1922, and KGKO in Wichita Falls, which signed on in 1926. The call letters of both stations were randomly assigned from a sequential roster of available call signs.

WFAA radio signed on June 26, 1922. It shared its frequency with WBAP in Fort Worth. As both stations grew, but neither were willing to give up the frequency to the other, they finally found resolution by co-purchasing KGKO (570 AM) in Wichita Falls and moving it to Arlington on May 1, 1938. KGKO had signed on September 9, 1926. Inititally, 570 kept the KGKO call letters, while 820 was either WBAP or WFAA depending on which station was on the air. While WFAA was on 820, WBAP was responsible for the programming on 570 and vice versa.

In 1947, the KGKO call letters on 570 were deleted, and it became either WBAP or WFAA depending on which station was not on 820. Regardless of which station was on 570 or 820, the network affiliation remained consistent on each frequency (ABC on 570 and NBC on 820). This basic dual time sharing arrangement lasted until May 1, 1970, when 570 became WFAA full time with a middle of the road music format.

WFAA's music format lasted until November 1976, when the station began a talk radio format that lasted until July 2, 1983. At that point, the station began broadcasting in AM stereo with classic rock and the callsign KRQX. The station flipped on January 26, 1987, to a 1950s and 1960s oldies format, with new callsign KLDD. In January 1990, the station switched to a simulcast of KKWM-FM as KKWM.

=== First news/talk era ===
On February 5, 1990, Susquehanna Radio Corporation purchased KKWM from Anchor Media Ltd. That purchase became final on November 29, 1990. Beginning at 5 a.m., KLIF, which had previously been on 1190 AM, simulcast on both the 570 and 1190 frequencies for one week, and then began broadcasting on 570 kHz permanently. Susquehanna Radio Corporation, a division of kitchenware maker Susquehanna Pfaltzgraff, was sold to Cumulus Media in 2005.

An event which foreshadowed KLIF's future success in the news/talk format was the assassination of John F. Kennedy on November 22, 1963. Even though KLIF (1190 AM) was a Top 40 station, KLIF News was always quick to report news bulletins when they came in. The station was one of the first media outlets on the air with reports of the shooting. KLIF (1190 AM) changed to talk radio in 1986 and became one of the market's leading talk radio stations before other competitors soon emerged. KRLD, its primary competitor, was mostly all news but with talk shows nights and weekends.

KLIF had a "classic" lineup of hosts. Kevin McCarthy, with a more centrist point of view, held the midday spot with interviews and conversational radio. David Gold had the late afternoon shift with his brand of conservatism. The station's morning show featured Norm Hitzges on sports. Up until then, sports talk had primarily aired in afternoons and evenings in most U.S. cities. That lineup made the station one of the most respected Dallas-Fort Worth talk radio stations. Community leaders and politicians listened regularly, according to a Dallas magazine report. It was during this time when KLIF achieved its highest ratings ever as a news-talk station, the only time it ever cracked the Top 10 after its Top 40 heyday.

During the 1995 O.J. Simpson trials, KLIF simulcast the audio of KDFI's trial wrap ups. Competition in the form of all-sports radio began to hurt KLIF's ratings. Other stations offered more opinionated talk show hosts. As a result, the station's ratings plummeted, barely garnering a 1.0 share.

Despite different owners, KLIF and KDFW maintain a partnership. KLIF is affiliated with Fox News Radio, while KDFW is the local Fox O&O (owned and operated) station. In January 2015, KLIF began carrying Westwood One News from its parent company's news operation. On August 30, 2020, KLIF once again became an affiliate of Fox News Radio after Westwood One News ended operations. KDFW-TV provides some local news and weather coverage.

KLIF is licensed to transmit a digital signal using iBiquity's "HD Radio" system but stopped in 2009. Because the license to broadcast digital "HD Radio" is perpetual, the station could resume digital broadcasts at any time. Meanwhile, KLIF's programming was retransmitted on sister station KLIF-FM-HD2. KLIF-FM temporarily stopped its HD Radio simulcast in late November 2011 and resumed in early January 2012. As of February 2013, the simulcast has been moved to KSCS-HD2.

For many years, KLIF ran 5,000 watts of power around the clock from a transmitter site in Coppell near North Lake. In July 2016, KLIF filed an application for a construction permit to diplex from the KTCK transmitter site, on Ledbetter Road in Irving, and decrease night power to 2,400 watts. The switch to the Irving site was made several years later. While Cumulus has profited from sales of other transmitter sites such as WMAL in Washington and KABC in Los Angeles, the North Lake land is owned by an electric utility and was rented by 570.

=== Flip to all-news blocks, return to mostly talk ===
Cumulus Media acquired Citadel Broadcasting in late 2011, bringing KLIF and its larger rival WBAP and WBAP-FM 96.7 under common ownership. To reflect the common ownership between the two stations, KLIF began swapping programming with WBAP and retooled its drive times to an all-news radio format, designed to compete against CBS Radio-owned KRLD.

Afternoon host Chris Krok was transferred to WBAP for a local talk show in the evening hours, while morning host Jeff Bolton was dismissed. The weekday lineup for KLIF included the local 'DFW Morning News with Dave Williams', Glenn Beck, Sean Hannity, and Coast to Coast AM. KLIF switched "The Dana Show" to weekends, putting "Markley, Van Camp and Robbins" in her weekday slot in early 2022. KLIF also serves as an overflow for NFL on Westwood One Sports in case sister sports station KTCK and KTCK-FM are carrying local sporting events (e.g. Dallas Stars NHL games) on the same evening. KLIF runs Fox News Radio's top-of-the-hour newscasts.

=== Former hosts ===
Hosts previously heard on KLIF include David Gold, Norm Hitzges, and Kevin McCarthy.

== See also ==
- List of initial AM-band station grants in the United States
