= David Gold (talk radio host) =

American radio host (1949/1950–2025)

David Gold (1949 or 1950 – December 2025) was an American conservative talk radio host. Gold was a talk radio host from the mid-1970s, and one of the first U.S. conservative talk radio hosts. His philosophy was characterized as in the conservative-libertarian vein.

== Broadcasting career ==
Gold worked as a local talk host in markets such as Boston, Denver, Tampa, Miami and Dallas.

Gold began his career at KWBZ Radio in Denver, a powerful talk radio station the country's 22nd largest radio market, where he worked alongside legendary host Alan Berg. Then, during the mid-1980s, Gold moved to Tampa, Florida, where he became that city's first conservative talk host on WPLP-AM. Gold then moved to Miami to do a talk show before heading west to Dallas, where he would find the most success hosting local talk radio programs.

Along with his friend Kevin McCarthy, Gold was one of the top hosts at KLIF, the first full-time talk radio station in the fifth-biggest U.S. radio market. Unusual for a radio station, the station became prominent in the city's mediascape. Its hosts were often quoted in local media and amongst local politicians. Gold was a staple at KLIF, where he ruled the afternoon "drive time" show from 1986 to 1997.

=== Later radio work ===
Gold most recently hosted an afternoon show at KSFO in San Francisco. His voice was often heard as a fill-in host at stations in markets such as Tampa and Seattle.

=== Other media work ===
Gold was asked to present his opinion as a guest on numerous programs including Nightline, Crossfire and Good Morning America. Gold co-hosted a weekly debate on the Dallas NBC Affiliate, KXAS-TV.

== Quotes ==
One Dallas publication described Gold's influence in Dallas media:

Best known was David Gold, the 3 p.m.-to-6 p.m. local Limbaugh before Limbaugh was cool, a huge talent who infuriated and captivated, such as in his first week when he suggested putting all death row inmates in the Texas Stadium end zone, wiring them, then frying them.

== Death ==
On December 11, 2025, it was announced that Gold had died at the age of 75.
