= Johann George Pfaltzgraff =

Johann George Pfaltzgraff (or Pfaltzgraf; May 5, 1808 – January 7, 1873) was a German-American potter and businessman. He is recognized as the first potter in the Pfaltzgraff family of potters in the United States. Pfaltzgraff Pottery Co. is known as the oldest pottery company in the USA. Lifetime Brands purchased the business in 2005.

Born in Frielendorf, Germany, he moved to Foustown in York County, Pennsylvania, United States in 1833. He arrived with his wife Hedwig (née Hedwig Elenora Brehmer), right after they were married on May 27, 1833 in Frielendorf. His wife was a commoner by German standards while Johann came from a family of great distinction and the upper class, as his family owned a pottery company. The marriage was frowned upon by his family in Germany, so Johann decided that a move to the United States was in the best interests of himself and Elenora. Johann and Elenora had ten children. After they settled into the Foustown community, Johann began his new life as a farmer. He also started his trade that he mastered while in Germany by designing and creating his own pottery. He almost immediately began making stoneware from clay that he would purchase from Ohio. He used local lands in the Foustown area to gather his own clays as this region of Pennsylvania is rich in clays. Later, four of his sons learned the trade from him. There were: John, George, Henry, and Cornelius.

Johann died January 7, 1873, aged 64. He is buried in the Loucks Cemetery (also known as Wolf's) across the street from the West Manchester Mall at 1881 Loucks Road, York, Pennsylvania. His widow, Hedwig, died on January 8, 1896, and is buried in the same cemetery. Other Pfaltzgraff family members are buried in Prospect Hill Cemetery in York.

== See also ==
- Susquehanna Pfaltzgraff
- Pfaltzgraff
