= WBAP-FM =

Radio station in Haltom City, Texas

Simulcast of WBAP, Fort Worth
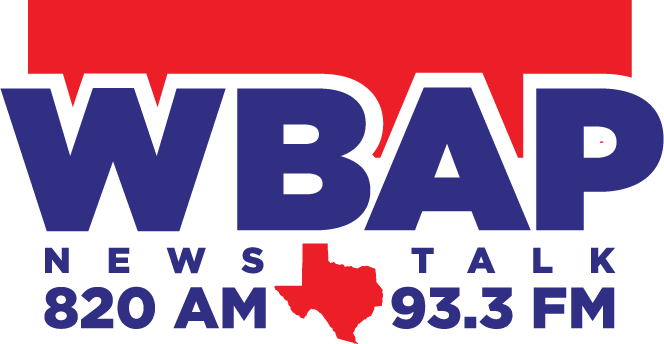
- Haltom City, Texas; United States
- Broadcast area: Dallas–Fort Worth metroplex
- Frequency: 93.3 MHz (HD Radio)
- Branding: Newstalk 820 WBAP and FM 93.3

Programming
- Language: English
- Format: News/Talk
- Subchannels: HD2: Country music
- Affiliations: Fox News Radio; Westwood One; Compass Media Networks; The Weather Channel; WFAA-TV

Ownership
- Owner: Cumulus Media; (Cumulus Licensing Holding Company LLC)
- Sister stations: KLIF, KPLX, KSCS, KTCK, KTCK-FM, WBAP

History
- First air date: October 31, 1996 (as KNBR-FM)
- Former call signs: KNBR-FM (1996); KKZN (1996–1999); KKMR (1999–2002); KDBN (2002–2009); KLIF-FM (2009–2024)
- Call sign meaning: "We Bring A Program" (taken from WBAP)

Technical information
- Licensing authority: FCC
- Facility ID: 27299
- Class: C2
- ERP: 50,000 watts
- HAAT: 120 meters (390 ft)
- Transmitter coordinates: 32°46′44″N 96°55′22″W

Links
- Public license information: Public file; LMS
- Webcast: Listen Live; Listen Live (HD2)
- Website: www.wbap.com; HD2: www.classiccountrydfw.com

WBAP-FM (93.3 MHz, "Newstalk WBAP") is a commercial radio station licensed to Haltom City, Texas, and serving the Dallas-Fort Worth Metroplex. The station is owned by Cumulus Media, and the broadcast license is held by Radio License Holding SRC LLC. It broadcasts a news/talk radio format, as a simulcast of WBAP in Fort Worth. The studios and offices are in the Victory Park district in Dallas just north of downtown.

WBAP-FM maintains a transmitter site on Singleton Boulevard in West Dallas near the I-30–Loop 12 interchange. It has an effective radiated power (ERP) of 50,000 watts, with its tower at 120 meters (394 ft) in height above average terrain (HAAT). This gives WBAP-FM a somewhat limited signal, roughly 3dB less than most Dallas FM stations, which are powered at 100,000 watts, and with towers four times taller than WBAP-FM. It is licensed by iBiquity to broadcast a digital HD Radio signal. WBAP-FM stopped transmitting its digital signals in late November 2011 and resumed in early January 2012 before ceasing again in 2014. In May 2022, WBAP-FM resumed its digital broadcasts again.

== Emergency preparedness ==
As 93.3 FM simulcasts WBAP, both stations and sister KSCS are responsible for activation of the North Texas Emergency Alert System when hazardous weather alerts, Disaster area declarations, and child abductions are issued.

== History and formats ==
=== The Zone ===
Marcos A. Rodriguez was the first to control the license after having successfully obtained it directly from the Federal Communications Commission (FCC). After his financing source defaulted, Rodriguez sold the license to Susquehanna Radio.

93.3 FM began broadcasting on October 31, 1996, as KNBR-FM "The Zone", with an adult alternative format. The call sign KNBR-FM was only short-term, as it was changed to KKZN to match the moniker on December 20, 1996.

=== Merge Radio ===
After a day-long stunt with episodes of The Bob Newhart Show and a loop of "Pop Muzik" by M, the station became KKMR "Merge Radio", with a modern AC format on August 31, 1999. The station's slogan was "Cool Rock. Smart Pop." The first song on "Merge" was "Are You Gonna Go My Way?" by Lenny Kravitz. Station management referred to Merge as "the nation's first new digital media station". The name "Merge" was meant to signify the merging of traditional radio with the internet. The disc jockeys were referred to as Web Jammers. In addition to playing music and answering phone calls, they were responsible for responding to listener emails and updating the station website.

=== The Bone ===
At midnight on January 3, 2002, after playing "Brass in Pocket" by The Pretenders, the station began stunting with funeral bells and random audio soundbites. At 5 p.m. that day, the station became KDBN "The Bone", with a 1970s/1980s-based classic rock format (specifically hard rock and heavy metal from that era), launching with "Bad to the Bone" by George Thorogood and the Destroyers. The station's slogan was "Classic Texas Rock That Rocks!" This produced an initial spike in ratings, though the station lost much of that audience as the years progressed. The station featured longtime KZPS DJs Sam "Bo" Roberts and "Long" Jim White ("Bo and Jim") in the mornings.

=== FM 93-3 ===
On April 24, 2009, KDBN began stunting with music from the Dave Matthews Band with limited commercial interruptions. Three days later, the station switched back to adult album alternative as "FM 93-3 - Quality Rock", with the first song being "What's the Frequency, Kenneth?" by R.E.M. On-air staff included The Regular Guys, a morning show syndicated from Atlanta, Alexis (middays), and Scott Gaines (afternoons). Among former on-air staff were Gary Thompson (mornings), Pugs and Kelly (afternoons), Candy Stuart, Bo Roberts, Yvonne Monet, Jeff K, Bob Carter, Channing, Jennifer Reed, Kat Von Erick, Debbie Sexxton, Squeaky, Paladin, Logan, Gary Zee, Royce Dex, Barb Smith (traffic reporter), and Rich Phillips (sports reporter). However, this format was short-lived, with poor ratings.

The station was, for a short time, an affiliate of the Dallas Cowboys Radio Network.

=== i93 ===
On September 2, 2009, the station began stunting again, urging listeners to tune in September 4 at Noon. At that time, the station launched a top 40 format as "i93", and on September 7, a call sign change to KLIF-FM was made.

As a reference to the station's i branding used for newer Cumulus-launched top 40 stations, the station's new top 40 format launched with The Black Eyed Peas' "I Gotta Feeling". The station aimed for an older audience; rival KHKS skewed toward younger listeners. KLIF-FM was the flagship station for Nights Live with Adam Bomb. After another format change at 93.3 FM, the show moved back to Atlanta's WWWQ-FM.

=== Hot 93-3 ===
In September 2014, websites were registered showing a possible rebranding or format change to rhythmic Top 40/CHR, urban, classic hits, oldies, smooth jazz, or rhythmic oldies. The registrations followed the recent hiring of former KBFF/Portland program director Louie Cruz for the same position at KLIF-FM. This station had not been able to make up ground on KHKS as it continued to hover right below a 2 share in the Dallas–Fort Worth Nielsen ratings of August 2014. The change was confirmed on October 3 of that year, when 93.3 began running liners promoting that "Something New Arrives At 93.3" at 5 p.m. that day, and relaunched as "Hot 93.3". While the station still maintained its Top 40 format as before, KLIF-FM began leaning towards rhythmic CHR.

On November 14, 2014, at 5 p.m., KLIF-FM began playing classic hip hop songs around the clock (as part of a holiday season-only promotion), only to be upstaged an hour later by KSOC, which dropped its urban AC direction to go full-time with classic hip hop as "Boom 94.5". It is not known if this was done intentionally, or if KLIF-FM was trying to pull a pre-emptive strike to bring the format first to the area before another station picked it up. The flip also resulted in Mediabase changing KLIF-FM's reporting status from Top 40/CHR to rhythmic.

On December 2, 2014, at 6 p.m., KLIF-FM shifted its format to urban contemporary, retaining the "Hot 93.3" branding, even though Mediabase continued to list the station as a rhythmic reporter, with the first song being "Latch" by Disclosure featuring Sam Smith. Competitors in the format included KKDA-FM and KBFB. In March 2015, KLIF-FM adjusted its direction back to Rhythmic with the inclusion of pop/dance crossovers that it had dropped previously and was added to the Nielsen BDS Rhythmic reporting panel.

In September 2015, KLIF-FM gradually returned to more of a mainstream Top 40/CHR format, putting it in competition with KHKS once again, a status affirmed with Mediabase returning KLIF-FM to its pop panel in November. Nielsen BDS continued to have KLIF-FM report to the rhythmic panel until May 2016. It competed with KHKS and, for a time from October 2016 to November 2017, CBS Radio-owned Hot AC-leaning KVIL. Ironically, AM sister station KLIF, during its Top 40 era, was competing with KVIL in the late 1960s. KLIF-FM also, to a lesser extent, competed with KHKS's sister station KDMX.

As of September 2019, KLIF-FM shifted back to a Rhythmic Top 40 direction as it began increasing the amount of R&B–Hip-Hop currents being played, thus putting it back in competition with KKDA and KBFB again, while continuing to go after KHKS.

KLIF-FM was the third station in the Metroplex to use the "Hot" branding; the first was KRBV (now KJKK) from 1999 to 2001, and the second was KESS-FM (now KDXX) in 2013.

=== 1990s/2000s hits ===
On December 19, 2022, at midnight, after playing "Goodbyes" by nearby Grapevine's Post Malone featuring Young Thug, KLIF-FM shifted to a 1990s/2000s hits format, though still branded as "Hot 93.3". The Ariana Grande remix version of "Save Your Tears" by The Weeknd was the first song played. The station focused primarily on music from the 1990s through the 2010s, with a limited number of currents and recurrents remaining. The move took KLIF-FM out of direct competition with KHKS and instead focused their competition with similarly formatted KDMX, and came as the station had slipped under a 1-share in the Nielsen Audio ratings, carrying just a 0.8 in the October and November books, the last under the CHR format.

The station moved on from morning host Mason and the syndicated Tino Cochino Show. The Adam Bomb Show returned to mornings, while midday host Ali and program director/afternoon host Sid Kelly remained with the station through the shift. Despite the move, the format would continue to stay in the lower echelon of the Dallas-Ft. Worth area Nielsen Audio market ratings, ending with an 0.8 share for December 2023.

Rumors of a format change intensified with the sudden dismissal of Sid Kelly and subsequent removal of his page from the station website on December 14. KLIF-FM ran jockless in that timeslot afterwards.

=== WBAP simulcast ===
Rumors of a format change were unintentionally verified the following day. WBAP meteorologist Brad Barton, through a comment in a post for the Facebook group "I Take Pictures of Radio & TV Stations", inadvertently leaked an announcement that WBAP would simulcast on KLIF-FM beginning January 3, 2024. The move would bring WBAP's programming back to FM as it had previously been simulcast on 96.7 FM from 2010 to 2013. The move was officially confirmed by Cumulus on January 2, and took place at 8:20 a.m. the following day. (820 is the AM station's dial position.)

"Hot 93.3" signed off with a block of departure-themed songs, ending with "I'll Be Missing You" by Puff Daddy featuring 112 and Faith Evans and "Good Riddance (Time of Your Life)" by Green Day. A sweeper was aired, redirecting "Hot" listeners to KPLX and KSCS. That was followed by a brief historical recap of WBAP's news coverage, to mark the beginning of the simulcast. On January 22, 2024, KLIF-FM changed its call sign to WBAP-FM.

== Programming ==
WBAP-AM-FM air both local and nationally syndicated shows. Weekdays begin with the WBAP Morning News anchored by Ernie Brown, Carla Marion and Hal Jay. That's followed by Matt Locke in late mornings and Texas native James Parker in afternoon drive time. In early evenings, The Mark Levin Show from Westwood One airs. The Joe Pags Show, from Compass Media Networks, took over the late weekday evening time slot in February 2025.

Weekends include syndicated programs from Chris Plante, McGraw Milhaven and Ben Ferguson, along with shows on money, cars, home improvement, real estate, hunting and the outdoors. Paid brokered programming also airs. Most hours on weekdays start with local news at the top of the hour, while nights and weekends, an update from Fox News Radio is heard.

WBAP is the flagship station of Westwood One's nationally syndicated overnight program Red Eye Radio (formerly Midnight Trucking Radio Network), that traces its roots to Bill Mack's overnight show from 1969. Hosts Eric Harley and Gary McNamara are heard live locally weeknights, with "Best of" programs heard weekend overnights.

== HD Radio ==
=== HD2 ===
The station's HD2 signal first launched in 2006 with an unbranded "New Adult Alternative" format. A year later, it changed to an all-90s format under the name "Energy 93.3" where it lasted for 2 years. On February 14, 2010, the HD2 signal switched to a simulcast of News/Talk sister station KLIF.

After the KLIF simulcast moved to KSCS's HD2 slot in February 2013, the secondary subchannel was offline with no programming replacement until KLIF-FM reactivated its HD broadcasts in 2022 with a Classic Rock format syndicated by Westwood One.

On December 15, 2025, WBAP-FM's HD2 subchannel changed their format from classic rock to classic country, branded as "Country Legends and Texas Classics 93.3 HD2".

=== HD3 ===
The HD3 subchannel signed on in 2022 at the same time 93.3's HD broadcasts relaunched. Throughout its tenure, the subchannel aired a classic hits format syndicated by Westwood One. After WBAP-FM's HD2 signal changed to a classic country format, the HD3 slot went dark with no programming replacement.
