= KTCK =

KTCK could refer to:

- KTCK (AM), a radio station (1310 AM) licensed to Fort Worth, Texas, United States
- KTCK-FM, a radio station (96.7 FM) licensed to Flower Mound, Texas, United States
