= KPLX =

Radio station in Fort Worth, Texas

Coordinates: 32.582°N 96.976°W

- Fort Worth, Texas; United States
- Broadcast area: Dallas–Fort Worth metroplex
- Frequency: 99.5 MHz (HD Radio)
- Branding: 99.5 The Wolf

Programming
- Format: Country
- Subchannels: HD2: WBAP talk radio simulcast
- Affiliations: Westwood One

Ownership
- Owner: Cumulus Media; (KPLX Lico, LLC)
- Sister stations: KLIF, KSCS, KTCK, KTCK-FM, WBAP, WBAP-FM

History
- First air date: 1962
- Former call signs: KXOL-FM (1962–1968); KCWM (1968–1971); KXOL-FM (1971–1973)
- Call sign meaning: Metroplex

Technical information
- Licensing authority: FCC
- Facility ID: 54675
- Class: C
- ERP: 100,000 watts
- HAAT: 507 meters (1,663 ft)

Links
- Public license information: Public file; LMS
- Webcast: Listen live Listen live (via iHeartRadio)
- Website: 995thewolf.com

KPLX (99.5 FM, "99.5 The Wolf") is a commercial radio station broadcasting a gold-based country radio format. It is licensed to Fort Worth, Texas, and serves the Dallas–Fort Worth metroplex. KPLX is owned by Cumulus Media, with studios and offices in the Victory Park district in Dallas, just north of downtown. Cumulus owns two FM country stations in the radio market, but both KPLX and KSCS maintain separate staffs and musical directions.

KPLX has an effective radiated power (ERP) of 100,000 watts. The transmitter is off West Belt Line Road in Cedar Hill, Texas, amid the towers for other FM and TV stations. KPLX broadcasts using HD Radio technology. The HD-2 digital subchannel carries the talk format of sister station WBAP (820 AM).

== History ==
The station first signed on in 1962 as KXOL-FM. It operated as a sister station to KXOL (1360 AM, now KMNY) and carried an easy listening format. The call sign was changed to KCWM for "Country Western Music" in 1968 and became the first FM station in the market to air a country format. The call letters were changed back to KXOL-FM in 1971 with the format moving to an early form of the oldies format. In 1973, the call letters were changed to KPLX. The station was owned by the Wendall Mayes family (who also owned KNOW in Austin and KCRS in Midland, as well as interests in others) until 1974, when it was sold to Susquehanna Broadcasting. Susquehanna upgraded the station, making it a full 100,000 watts and moving the transmitter from southwest Arlington to Cedar Hill. Susquehanna was acquired by Cumulus Media in 2005.

The station had a middle of the road music format in 1974. It switched to a country music format on January 7, 1980. The station was known on-air as "K-Plex" and during that time, the slogan was "Flex Your 'Plex". The station re-branded as "The Wolf" on July 24, 1998, while still maintaining its country format.

KPLX has won "Radio Station of the Year" awards from the Country Music Association and the Academy of Country Music, as well as NAB Marconi Radio Awards, Billboard and Radio & Records awards. With its parent company's acquisition of Citadel Broadcasting in 2011, KPLX became a sister station to long-time rival KSCS. The latter shifted to a "New Country" format in 2012 to differentiate the two.

On March 15, 2022, KPLX shifted its format towards classic country. However, the station will still play country currents/recurrents overnight as part of the syndicated “Later … With Lia" show, which was cancelled by its syndicator at the end of that year. There have been no other changes to KPLX's branding and on-air schedule.

== HD Radio ==
KPLX broadcasts using HD Radio, and simulcasts sister station WBAP on the station's HD2 channel. Previously, the HD2 channel carried a Top 40 format as "Vibe 99-5."

== Airstaff ==
The current weekday lineup: Ryan Fox and Tara Ward host "Wake Up with The Wolf", Smokey Rivers is heard in middays, Jason Pullman in the afternoon and Vicki Ochoa at night.
