= Victory Park, Dallas =

Coordinates: 32.787798°N 96.810708°W

Victory Park
- Interactive map of Victory Park
- Country: United States
- State: Texas
- Counties: Dallas
- City: Dallas
- Area: Oak Lawn

Area
  - Total: 0.12 sq mi (0.30 km^{2})
  - Land: 0.12 sq mi (0.30 km^{2})
  - Water: 0 sq mi (0 km^{2}) 0%
- Elevation: 423 ft (129 m)
- ZIP code: 75201, 75202
- Area codes: 214, 469, 972
- Website: http://www.victorypark.com/

Victory Park is a master planned development northwest of downtown Dallas, Texas, and north of Spur 366 (Woodall Rodgers Freeway). It is along Interstate 35E, part of the Stemmons Corridor and Uptown.

The US$3 billion project, at 75 acres (0.30 km^{2}), is just north of the West End Historic District of downtown Dallas. When it is finished, the project will contain more than 4,000 residences and 4,000,000 square feet (370,000 m^{2}) of office and retail space.

== History ==
Victory Park was developed by Ross Perot, Jr., son of billionaire tycoon Ross Perot, who was a majority owner of the Dallas Mavericks NBA basketball team. Perot envisioned Victory Park as an "urban lifestyle destination." Anchored by the American Airlines Center, home of the Mavericks, the entire development was planned at a very detailed level by its developers.

The development has been criticized as being a "collection of imposing hyper-modern monumental structures, high-end chain stores, enormous video screens, expensive restaurants, a sports arena and tons of parking, completely isolated from the rest of the city by a pair of freeways . . . like the schizophrenic dream of some power-hungry capitalist technocrat." However, other journalists have countered this criticism of New Urbanist principles, citing that developments like Victory Park build on a classic, centuries old formula and "are not a quick fix but the slow weaving together of smart, sometimes big, often small, urban solutions" to create viable and enduring community destinations.

== Tenants ==
=== Current tenants ===
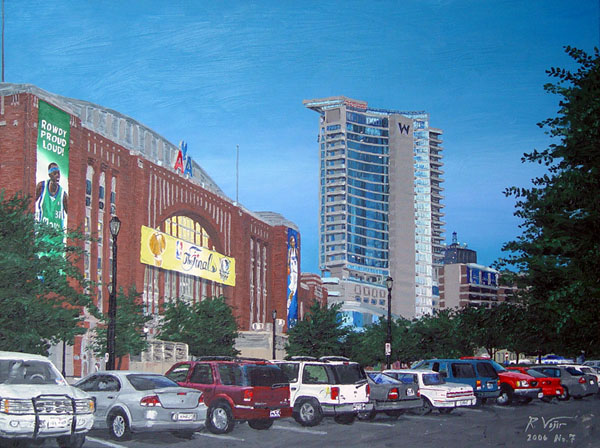
Maverick Excitement (2006) by R. Vojir featuring the American Airlines Center and W Dallas Victory Hotel and Residences

The American Airlines Center: Home of the Dallas Mavericks and Dallas Stars, was the first tenant located in Victory Park. The facility opened in July 2001.

Plaza Towers : office towers bordering AT&T Plaza. In 2012, Cumulus Media relocated their local radio stations (KLIF, KLIF-FM, KPLX, KSCS, KTCK AM/FM, and WBAP) here.

One Victory Park: A large office building across the street from the American Airlines Center and the W Hotel, which houses the Dallas office of Big 4 accounting firm Ernst & Young, corporate headquarters for PlainsCapital Bank, and the corporate headquarters for HF Sinclair. The buildings ground level features a 9,600 sq ft (890 m^{2}). Balducci's, a luxury gourmet grocer, Lucy Boutique and a Starbucks. This building features an environmentally friendly underfloor air system. Conditioned air for the occupants is provided by raised floor custom air handling units located in the tenant space that delivers 62 degree air into a raised access floor plenum. This underfloor air system provides users with the ability to control their own space temperature as well as improving the ventilation effectiveness. When building churn occurs, workstation moves can be performed easier with lower cost and less product waste.

Perot Museum of Nature and Science: Thom Mayne-designed museum dedicated to science, nature and the environment.

=== Former tenants ===
WFAA-TV, which had occupied a "window-on-the-world" studio in the Plaza Towers since 2007, left Victory Park in 2021 for an updated studio at the station's headquarters on Young Street.

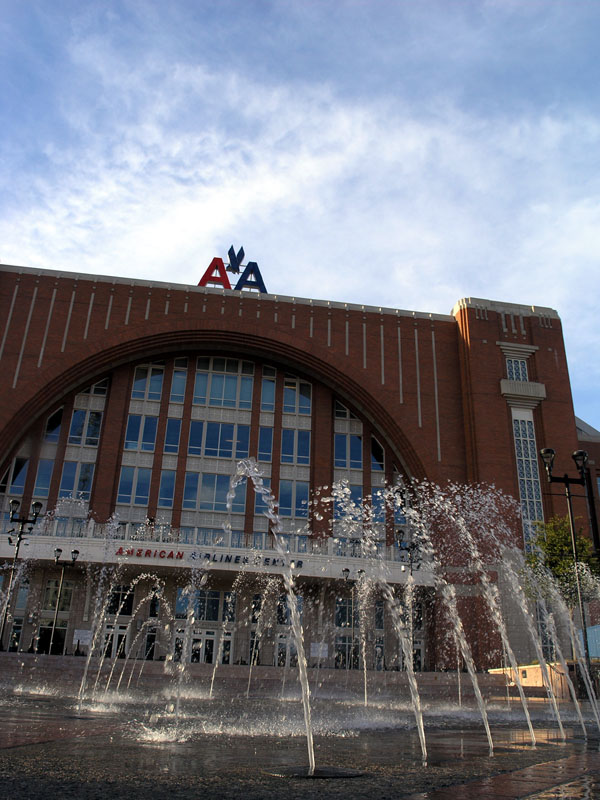
The American Airlines Center, with Victory Plaza designed by Athena Tacha

== Transportation ==
=== Commuter rail ===
- Trinity Railway Express
  - Victory Station

=== Light rail ===
- DART: Green Line and Orange Line
  - Victory Station

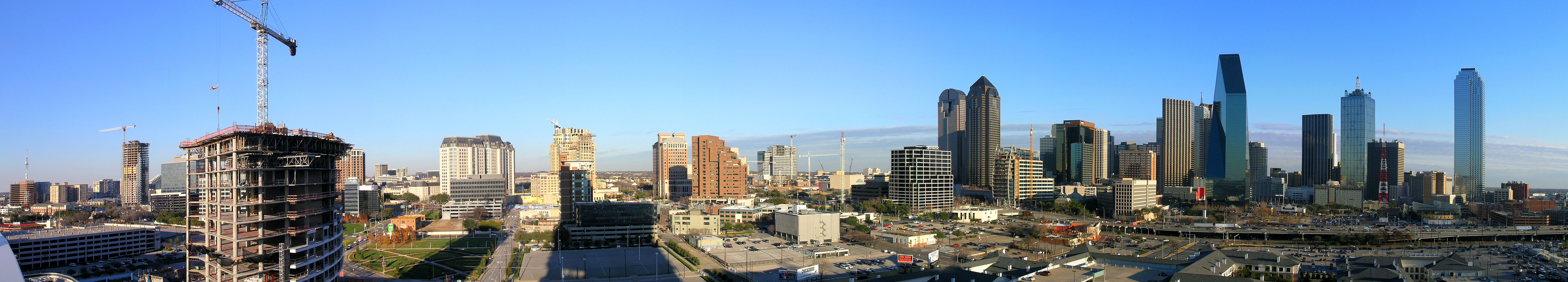
The view of downtown Dallas and Oak Lawn from the W Dallas Victory Hotel and Residences in Victory Park

== Education ==
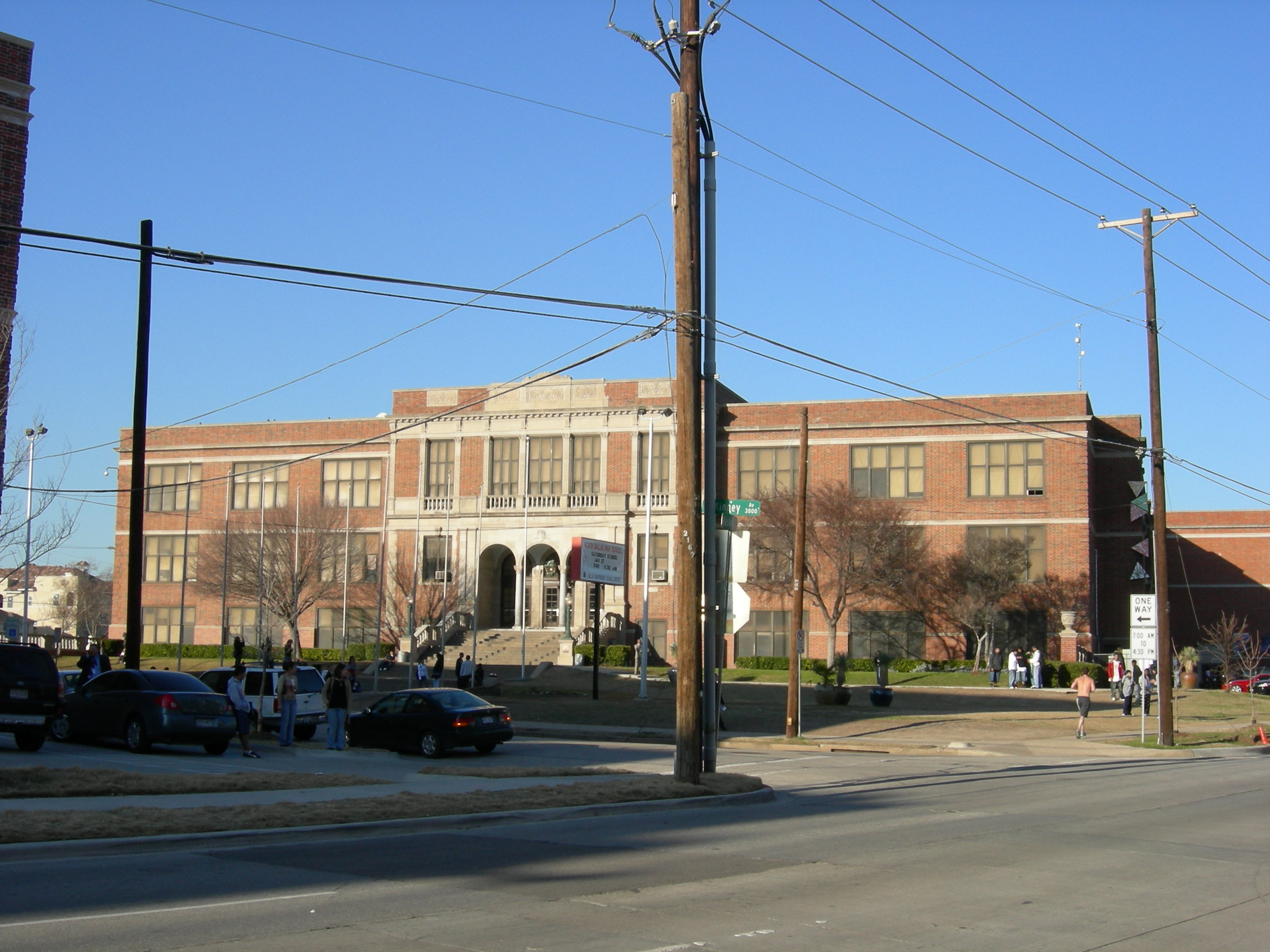
North Dallas High School

First Baptist Academy Downtown Campus

The district is zoned to schools in the Dallas Independent School District.

Residents of the neighborhood are zoned to Hope Medrano Elementary School, Thomas J. Rusk Middle School and North Dallas High School.
