= Susquehanna Radio Corporation =

1941–2006 media corporation

- Industry: Radio Broadcasting
- Founded: 1941
- Founder: Louis Appell
- Defunct: 2006
- Fate: Sold to successor
- Successor: Cumulus Media
- Headquarters: York, Pennsylvania, U.S.
- Area served: United States
- Key people: Louis Appell
- Owner: Susquehanna Pfaltzgraff

The Susquehanna Radio Corporation was a media corporation headquartered in York, Pennsylvania, that operated from 1941 to 2006. The company was a unit of Susquehanna Pfaltzgraff, a conglomerate more widely known for the Pfaltzgraff kitchenware line than its broadcasting pursuits.

== History ==
Some of the early Susquehanna radio properties included top 40 music stations WSBA (910 AM) in York; WARM (590 AM) in Scranton, Pennsylvania; WICE (1290 AM, now WPVD) in Providence, Rhode Island; and WHLO (640 AM) in Akron, Ohio. WQBA (1140 AM), a Spanish-language station in Miami, was part of the group, along with news/talk/music station WKIS (740AM) in Orlando, Florida. Susquehanna's best-known acquisition was the 1989 purchase of San Francisco's KNBR (680 AM) from NBC, the last radio station owned by the network, and its shepherding of that station into one of the nation's sports talk stations.

Over time, Susquehanna repositioned itself from a company based largely in the Northeast to one based largely in the Southern and Midwestern markets, nevertheless keeping its original stations in York. The company was absorbed into Cumulus Media in 2006 when Louis Appell's children broke up Susquehanna Pfaltzgraff.

The company is still active as a holding subsidiary named "Radio License Holding SRC, LLC".

== See also ==
- Susquehanna Communications
