= WBAP (AM) =

Radio station in Fort Worth, Texas

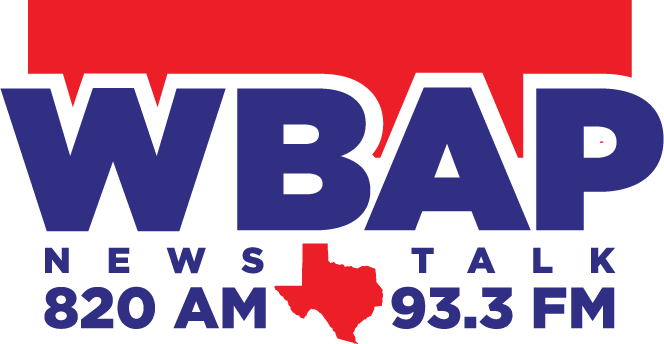
- Fort Worth, Texas; United States
- Broadcast area: Dallas–Fort Worth metroplex
- Frequency: 820 kHz
- Branding: News/Talk 820 WBAP and on FM 93.3

Programming
- Format: News/talk
- Affiliations: Compass Media Networks; Fox News Radio; The Weather Channel; Westwood One; WFAA (local news and weather partnership)

Ownership
- Owner: Cumulus Media; (Cumulus Licensing Holding Company LLC)
- Sister stations: KLIF; KPLX; KSCS; KTCK; KTCK-FM; WBAP-FM

History
- First air date: May 2, 1922
- Call sign meaning: None, sequentially assigned; "We Bring A Program" (backronym)

Technical information
- Licensing authority: FCC
- Facility ID: 71200
- Class: A
- Power: 50,000 watts unlimited
- Transmitter coordinates: 32°36′38.49″N 97°10′1.04″W (main); 32°36′43″N 97°9′56″W (aux)
- Repeaters: 93.3 WBAP-FM (Haltom City); 99.5 KPLX-HD2 (Fort Worth)

Links
- Public license information: Public file; LMS
- Webcast: Listen live
- Website: www.wbap.com

WBAP (820 AM) is a commercial radio station licensed to Fort Worth, Texas, United States, and serving the Dallas-Fort Worth Metroplex. Owned by Cumulus Media, it features a talk radio format in simulcast with WBAP-FM (93.3) in Haltom City, and broadcasts with 50,000 watts from a transmitter site in the northwest corner of Mansfield.

WBAP is a Class A clear-channel station, using a non-directional antenna, and is one of two clear-channel stations in the Metroplex along with Dallas-based KRLD. Its nighttime signal can often be heard throughout the Southern, Central, and Midwestern states and Northern Mexico, while its daytime signal provides at least secondary coverage from Oklahoma City to Austin. WBAP is one of the oldest radio stations in Texas, dating back to 1922, when stations in Texas were still given call signs beginning with "W" instead of "K".

== Emergency preparedness ==
WBAP and sister station KSCS are responsible for activation of the North Texas Emergency Alert System when hazardous weather alerts, Disaster area declarations, and child abductions are issued.

During a severe weather event on October 10, 2021, WBAP lost power along with much of its listening area. Brad Barton and several spotters had to broadcast its EAS and coverage via their 4G phones.

== History ==
=== Early years ===
WBAP began broadcasting May 2, 1922, transmitting at a wavelength of 360 meters (about 833 kHz). It changed to 400 meters (750 kHz) in August 1922. The station shared time with Dallas stations WFAA and WRR. It was the first station in the United States to have an audible logo signal similar to the NBC chimes, the WBAP cowbell. According to President Herbert Hoover, the station's call letters stood for "We Bring A Program", although in reality, the call letters were assigned sequentially, without any special meaning.

On May 15, 1923, the Federal Radio Commission expanded the broadcast band, and WBAP and WFAA moved to 476 meters (about 630 kHz). Another expansion moved WBAP to 600 kHz effective June 15, 1927, and this frequency was shared with WOAI in San Antonio. On November 11, 1928, WBAP moved to 800 kHz, and on June 1, 1929, WFAA also moved to 800 kHz, sharing time (and NBC Red Network affiliation) with WBAP. Station owner and Fort Worth booster Amon G. Carter was unhappy with having to share time on 800 kHz with WFAA, loathing anything that forced him to work with Dallas residents and businesses. Carter Publishing purchased KGKO in Wichita Falls (570 kHz) and moved it to Fort Worth as an affiliate of the NBC Blue network (which became ABC), and more importantly as a second frequency to be used when 800 kHz was not available. The sale was approved by the Federal Communications Commission September 24, 1935. On March 29, 1941, as a consequence of the North American Regional Broadcasting Agreement (NARBA), WBAP and WFAA moved one last time, to 820 kHz.

Carter eventually sold half of KGKO to A. H. Belo, owners of WFAA and the Dallas Morning News. On April 27, 1947, KGKO was replaced by a second shared frequency between WBAP and WFAA.

=== TV and FM stations ===
On September 29, 1948, WBAP pioneered television service in Texas with the opening of the state's first video outlet, NBC-TV network affiliate WBAP-TV on channel 5. A year later, WBAP added an FM station on 100.5, WBAP-FM. It moved to 96.3 MHz in 1955 and today is co-owned KSCS.

The dual frequency sharing arrangement between WBAP and WFAA continued through the 1950s and 1960s, with the stations switching frequencies several times a day. When WBAP changed frequencies, it signaled the change with a cowbell, which became widely associated with the station. Even though the stations swapped frequencies several times each day, the network affiliations remained constant: NBC network programming stayed on 820 kHz and ABC network programming stayed on 570 kHz. This frequently proved confusing for announcers and listeners alike.

=== 820 AM ===
On May 1, 1970, the unique dual split-frequency lives of WBAP and WFAA ended when WBAP paid $3.5 million to WFAA in exchange for sole occupancy of 820 kHz (and the NBC affiliation). WFAA took on 570 kHz (and the ABC affiliation), but with only 5,000 watts full-time. Once the frequency-sharing with WFAA ended in 1970, both stations were free to program musical formats, and WBAP began programming a full service country music format. It also gained the added benefit of 820's clear-channel signal; previously WFAA controlled it during these prime nighttime hours.

Also around this time, the FCC began to scrutinize ownership of broadcast stations and print media in the same market with the tightening of its rules, which disallowed new radio and/or television combinations with newspapers while grandfathering existing instances. Carter Publications' ownership of the Fort Worth Star-Telegram and WBAP-AM-FM-TV was one of three which existed in the Dallas/Fort Worth market. However, Carter voluntarily ended the cross-ownership issue in January 1973, when it announced the sale of all its Fort Worth media interests. WBAP and its FM sister (now known as KSCS), and the Star-Telegram were packaged to Capital Cities Communications for $64.5 million. LIN Broadcasting paid $35 million to acquire WBAP-TV, whose call letters were changed to KXAS-TV. The sales became final in the summer of 1974.

After a series of network affiliation changes in the late 1970s among WBAP, KRLD and WFAA, WBAP switched affiliations to ABC.

=== All-talk format ===
Logo prior to adding a simulcast on 96.7 FM in 2010

WBAP changed to an news/talk format on October 25, 1993, calling itself "News/Talk 820". It was also the radio flagship radio station of the Texas Rangers baseball team, airing the play-by-play, pre-game and post-game broadcasts.

Morning show host Hal Jay celebrated his 25-year anniversary with WBAP by organizing a charity fund-raising event for Cook Children's Hospital ("Hal Jay's Celebrity Roast"). Among those who attended were Baseball Hall-of-Famer Nolan Ryan and syndicated radio talk show host Sean Hannity.

=== Changes in ownership ===
On June 12, 2007, WBAP was one of many Disney/ABC Radio stations sold to Citadel Broadcasting. That same year, WBAP transmitted iBiquity HD Radio (digital) during the daytime and when not airing sports programming, until abruptly ending the "HD" digital transmission in early December 2008. Because the license to broadcast digital "HD Radio" is perpetual, the station could resume digital broadcasts at any time.

For many years, WBAP was the flagship station for Dallas Stars hockey team, but relinquished the rights beginning in the 2009–2010 season, as on January 16, 2009, the Dallas Stars named KTCK as its new flagship station for the next 5 years. With Cumulus Media's 2011 acquisition of Citadel, WBAP and KTCK became sister stations.

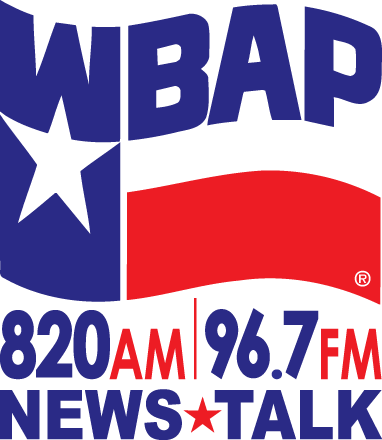
WBAP News/Talk 820 AM & 96.7 FM ident used during simulcast with WBAP-FM.

=== FM simulcasts ===
Sister station KPMZ (later WBAP-FM, now KTCK-FM) started simulcasting WBAP on 96.7 FM, March 15, 2010. Although broadcasting on a rimshot signal, management said that WBAP-FM provides "crystal-clear FM fidelity" for their listeners within 96.7's coverage area.

Logo before simulcasting on 93.3

On October 7, 2013, Cumulus announced the discontinuation of the WBAP simulcast on 96.7 FM. It switched call letters to KTCK-FM as a simulcast of the sports radio programming on co-owned KTCK. Dan Bennet, the vice president/market manager of Cumulus, said he had "seen no ratings increase since adding the FM". Bennett added, "WBAP at 820 AM still covers 114 counties in the day and has been heard in up to 38 states at night and early morning before the sun comes up. WBAP at 820 is one of the biggest radio signals in America." The WBAP simulcast moved to the second HD Radio channel of KPLX.

In 2015, WBAP ended decades of ABC News Radio affiliation and changed its national news feed to Westwood One News. On August 31, 2020, after the shutdown of Westwood One News, WBAP switched its national news affiliation to Fox News Radio.

WBAP's programming returned to FM on January 3, 2024, when the station began simulcasting on KLIF-FM 93.3, replacing the 1990s/2000s hits-formatted "Hot 93.3".

== Current programming ==
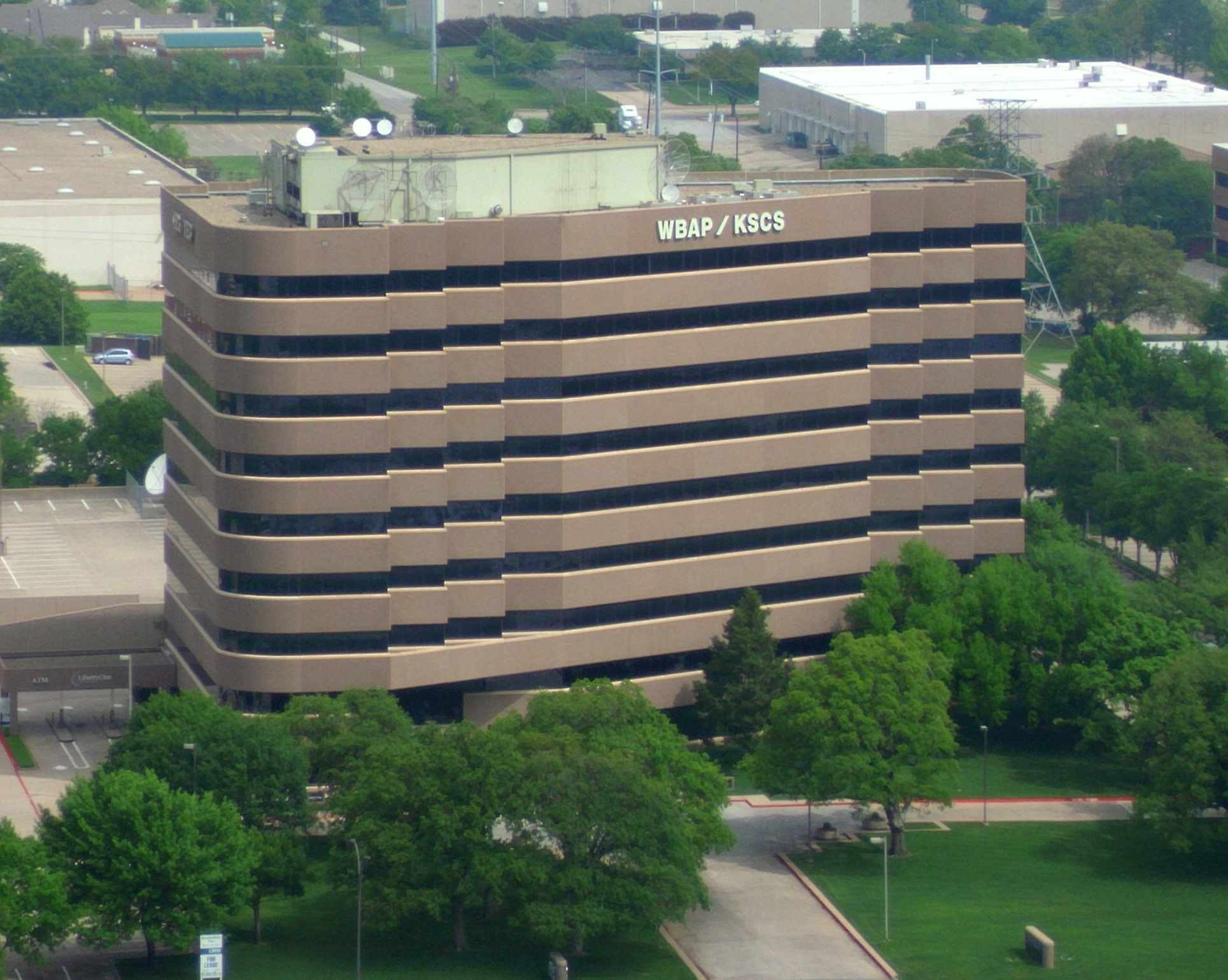
WBAP and KSCS shared a broadcast facility in Arlington, Texas, before moving to studios in Victory Park in Dallas.

WBAP-AM-FM air both local and nationally syndicated shows. Weekdays begin with the WBAP Morning News anchored by Ernie Brown, Carla Marion and Hal Jay. That's followed by Matt Locke in late mornings and Texas native James Parker in afternoon drive time. In early evenings, The Mark Levin Show from Westwood One airs. The Joe Pags Show, from Compass Media Networks, took over the late weekday evening time slot in February 2025.

Weekends include syndicated programs from Chris Plante, McGraw Milhaven and Ben Ferguson, along with shows on money, cars, home improvement, real estate, hunting and the outdoors. Paid brokered programming also airs. Most hours on weekdays start with local news at the top of the hour, while nights and weekends, an update from Fox News Radio is heard.

WBAP is the flagship station of Westwood One's nationally syndicated overnight program Red Eye Radio (formerly Midnight Trucking Radio Network), that traces its roots to Bill Mack's overnight show from 1969. Hosts Eric Harley and Gary McNamara are heard live locally weeknights, with "Best Of" programs heard weekend overnights.

Prior to Citadel's takeover of the station in August 2007, talk show host Mark Davis's program was a full three hours, (9 A.M. to Noon). As a result, Rush Limbaugh, Sean Hannity and Mark Levin were all forced to air on a one-hour tape delay. However, with Citadel's ownership of the station, Davis's show was both cut in length and shifted back by a half-hour, to carry the top-rated talkers live. Davis departed the station in March 2012 when a contract agreement could not be reached.

In the fall of 2010, WBAP began an agreement with Texas Christian University to air live play-by-play of TCU Horned Frogs football and TCU Horned Frogs men's basketball. The station carried every game of the undefeated football team in that first season.

== See also ==
- List of initial AM-band station grants in the United States
