= KSCS =

Radio station in Fort Worth, Texas

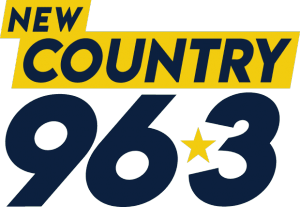

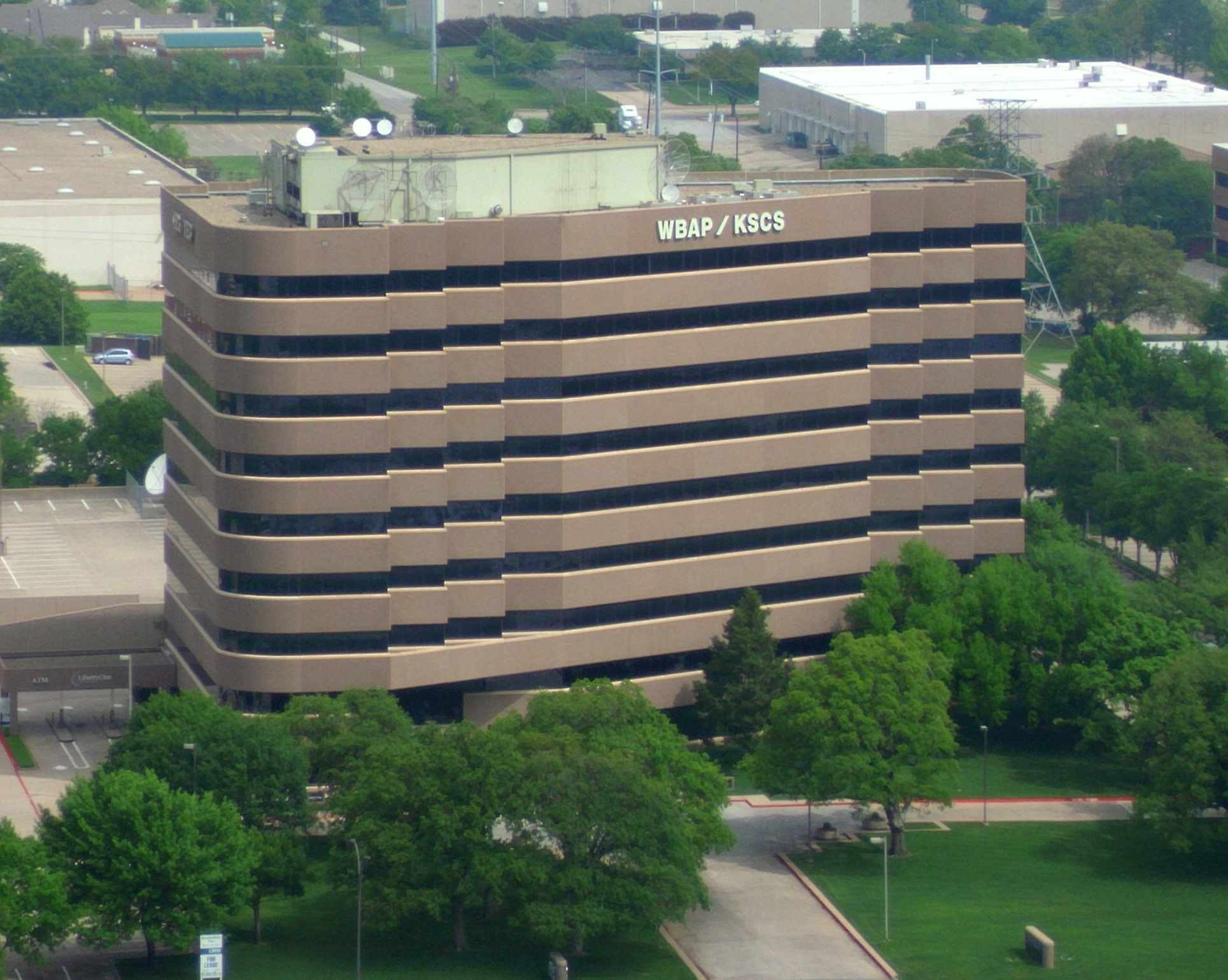
- The WBAP/KSCS shared facility in Arlington, Texas
- Fort Worth, Texas; United States
- Broadcast area: Dallas–Fort Worth metroplex
- Frequency: 96.3 MHz (HD Radio)
- Branding: New Country 96.3

Programming
- Language: English
- Format: Country music
- Subchannels: HD2: News/talk (KLIF simulcast)
- Affiliations: Compass Media Networks

Ownership
- Owner: Cumulus Media; (Cumulus Licensing Holding Company LLC)
- Sister stations: KLIF; KPLX; KTCK; KTCK-FM; WBAP; WBAP-FM

History
- First air date: 1949 (77 years ago)
- Former call signs: WBAP-FM (1949–1973)
- Former frequencies: 100.5 MHz (1949–1955)
- Call sign meaning: "Silver Country Stereo"

Technical information
- Licensing authority: FCC
- Facility ID: 71201
- Class: C
- ERP: 100,000 watts
- HAAT: 507 meters (1,663 ft)
- Transmitter coordinates: 32°34′55″N 96°58′33″W

Links
- Public license information: Public file; LMS
- Webcast: Listen live; Listen live (via Audacy); Listen live (via iHeartRadio)
- Website: newcountry963.com

KSCS (96.3 FM) is a commercial radio station licensed to Fort Worth, Texas, and serving the Dallas–Fort Worth metroplex. The station is owned by Cumulus Media and broadcasts a country music radio format. The studios are in the Victory Park district in Dallas just north of downtown. KSCS and sister station WBAP are responsible for activation of the North Texas Emergency Alert System when hazardous weather alerts, disaster area declarations, and Amber alerts for child abductions are issued.

KSCS has an effective radiated power (ERP) of 100,000 watts. The transmitter is off Mansfield Road in Cedar Hill, Texas, amid the radio towers for other FM and TV stations. KSCS uses HD Radio technology; its HD2 digital subchannel carries the news/talk programming of KLIF (570 AM).

== Programming ==
KSCS is the home of Hawkeye In The Morning, currently the longest-running morning radio show in the Dallas/Fort Worth area. The show features Mark "Hawkeye" Louis and Michelle Rodriguez, who previously hosted Middays since 2011. Formerly known as "The Dorsey Gang", the morning show featured Country Music Disc Jockey Hall of Fame member Terry Dorsey. Dorsey and Louis won numerous awards including Billboard's Major Market Air Personalities of 1998 and the Academy of Country Music's 2008 Personalities of the Year. Dorsey and Louis teamed up in July 1988, a partnership that would last until Dorsey's retirement in December 2014.

KSCS was named "2009 Major Market Radio Station of the Year" by the Academy of Country Music, "2020 Major Market Radio Station of the Year" by the Country Music Association and the 2022 National Association of Broadcasters Marconi Award for Country Station of the Year. Afternoons have been hosted by Al Farb since 2018.

== History ==
=== Classical WBAP-FM ===
The station first signed on the air on March 8, 1949, as WBAP-FM. It originally broadcast on 100.5 FM and was under the control of Amon G. Carter, as part of his Carter Publications Company. The station moved to 96.3 FM in 1955.

At first, it largely simulcast co-owned WBAP (820 AM), with some separate classical music shows at night. In the 1960s, WBAP-FM switched to all-classical music, which had been a popular format in the early days of FM radio. The classical format benefited from FM stereo, which improved the quality of music broadcasts.

=== Country KSCS ===
WBAP had much success broadcasting a classic country format known as "Country Gold", beginning in 1970. Management decided to extend the country music brand to FM. On January 15, 1973, WBAP-FM switched to a country format known as "Silver Country Stereo". The call letters changed to KSCS to match the slogan. The initial design behind KSCS was to play country music but with beautiful music-style FM formatics, featuring three or four songs in a row without talking, as well as using low-key announcers and carrying a lighter commercial load compared to AM stations. A year later, Carter Publications sold KSCS to Capital Cities. Capital Cities acquired the American Broadcasting Company (ABC) in 1985, using that company's name.

As more people began acquiring FM radios and listening to FM for music, KSCS benefited from being the only country station on the FM dial. The rise in popularity of country music in the late 1970s led to KSCS becoming a dominant station in the ratings. It also brought competition in the form of KPLX, which entered the country music market in 1980.

=== The Terry Dorsey era ===
KSCS was the number-one radio station overall in Dallas/Fort Worth from 1980 to 1982. The station's ratings started to sag after the Urban Cowboy era faded, and with tough competition from KPLX. In 1988, KSCS hired away KPLX's star morning host Terry Dorsey. With Dorsey's arrival, the ratings started to improve again, just as country music's popularity started to rise again. KSCS returned to the number one spot in the Dallas/Fort Worth Arbitron ratings in 1990, and stayed there for 14 consecutive ratings periods. To this day, that is still the longest winning streak in Dallas/Fort Worth ratings history.

KSCS, along with ABC's other non-Radio Disney and ESPN Radio stations, was sold to Citadel Broadcasting in 2007. In January 2008, KSCS was re-branded as "The Big 96.3". However, in November 2009, it reverted to its legacy branding in use since the 1980s.

=== New Country 96-3 ===
On January 4, 2011, at 5 pm, the station re-branded as "New Country 96.3 KSCS, Texas' Most Country Guaranteed". Citadel merged with Cumulus Media on September 16. This made KSCS a sister station to its longtime rival, KPLX.

In March 2015, KSCS, along with a few other Hot Country stations across Cumulus' portfolio tried an experiment, adding pop crossover songs by Rihanna, Kanye West, Paul McCartney, Avicii, Ed Sheeran, Ellie Goulding and a few other Top 40 artists with no ties to the "New Country" format. By Fall 2015, KSCS eliminated the pop crossover songs and returned to its core "New Country" artists.

In mid-July 2019, KSCS rebranded as "New Country 96.3" without the KSCS call letters in the branding.

== KSCS-HD2 ==
KSCS launched its HD2 digital subchannel in 2008 to broadcast "The Texas Twister", carrying all Texas country music. The format was previously on KTYS (96.7 FM, now KTCK-FM). After the Cumulus takeover in 2011, the HD broadcasts were temporarily discontinued.

The HD2 subchannel was dormant until February 2013, when it began simulcasting the news/talk format of co-owned KLIF.
