= Susquehanna Pfaltzgraff =

American conglomerate

The Susquehanna Pfaltzgraff Company was a conglomerate of companies that started in the 19th century with Johann George Pfaltzgraff's emigration from Germany to York, Pennsylvania (in the Susquehanna Valley).

Johann Pfaltzgraff was a potter and, after he died in the late 19th century, his children carried on his pottery making business and started The Pfaltzgraff Company, a kitchenware company, in 1889.

Susquehanna Broadcasting Company was founded in 1941 to apply for and operate a radio station in York, Pennsylvania, by Louis J. Appell, president and treasurer of Pfaltzgraff. The Federal Communications Commission issued a construction permit for the station, which would become WSBA, on December 30, 1941.

== Important Events ==
- In 1965, Susquehanna Communications (SusCom) was founded as a division of Susquehanna Broadcasting but changed its name in 1999, reflecting its change from a provider of traditional cable television to a provider of a variety of advanced, interactive, digital communications products.
- In December 1981, Susquehanna Real Estate was formed.
- In 1993, Susquehanna Media Company (SMC) was formed, of which Susquehanna Communications was a subsidiary (but, as of 2007, is owned by Comcast). Susquehanna Radio, another subsidiary, was bought by Cumulus Media Partners on May 5, 2006. Susquehanna Radio owned and operated 33 AM and FM stations nationwide at its peak, including WSBA AM in York, Pennsylvania.
- BlazeNet was founded in 1996 to provide dial-up and cable modem access in central Pennsylvania.
- Susquehanna Technologies (SusQtech) became its own entity in November 2001.
- In 2005, it was announced that the company was selling its radio and cable television businesses in separate deals for nearly $2 billion. Cumulus Media Inc. joined a consortium to acquire Susquehanna's radio broadcasting business for about $1.2 billion. Comcast Corp. announced that it was buying Susquehanna's cable TV and broadband businesses for $775 million. The deals were concluded in 2006.

== See also ==
- Susquehanna Communications
- Susquehanna Radio
- The Pfaltzgraff Company
