= Foustown, Pennsylvania =

Unincorporated community in Pennsylvania, U.S.

Foustown is an unincorporated community in Manchester Township, York County, Pennsylvania, United States.

Foustown is located at 39°59′42″N 76°46′18″W (39.9950974, -76.7716341), and lies 502 feet (153 m) above sea level.
