= Kevin McCarthy (radio) =

American broadcaster

Kevin McCarthy is an American radio-television personality in north Texas. He was part of the original staff of KNUS/99, being brought to the station by Gordon McLendon in 1972. After a 2-year stint at the legendary KFRC in San Francisco and 3 years as a sports anchor/reporter at the CBS-TV Station in Dallas, he spent fourteen years as a top-rated talk show host on KLIF before leaving in 2001 to start his own business, a multi-media marketing company.

He had been the "Trusty Sidekick" co-host with Jerry Reynolds on the Car Pro Show syndicated in over two dozen cities for over 22 years before retiring in 2024. He also does voice-overs for commercials, industrial videos and documentaries.

McCarthy was inducted into the Texas Radio Hall of Fame in 2002. He is a five–time winner of the Press Club of Dallas "Katie" award for "Best Talk Show" in Texas and the 1995 American Women in Radio & Television's Dallas-Fort Worth Radio Personality of the Year. He also served as the public address announcer for the Dallas Mavericks for twenty years until February 2000.

McCarthy is divorced and resides in Plano, Texas, a suburb north of Dallas.
