= Pfaltzgraff =

American kitchenware brand

- Industry: Kitchenware
- Predecessor: The Pfaltzgraff Co.
- Founded: 1811; 214 years ago in York County, Pennsylvania, United States
- Founder: Johann George Pfaltzgraff
- Parent: Lifetime Brands
- Website: www.pfaltzgraff.com

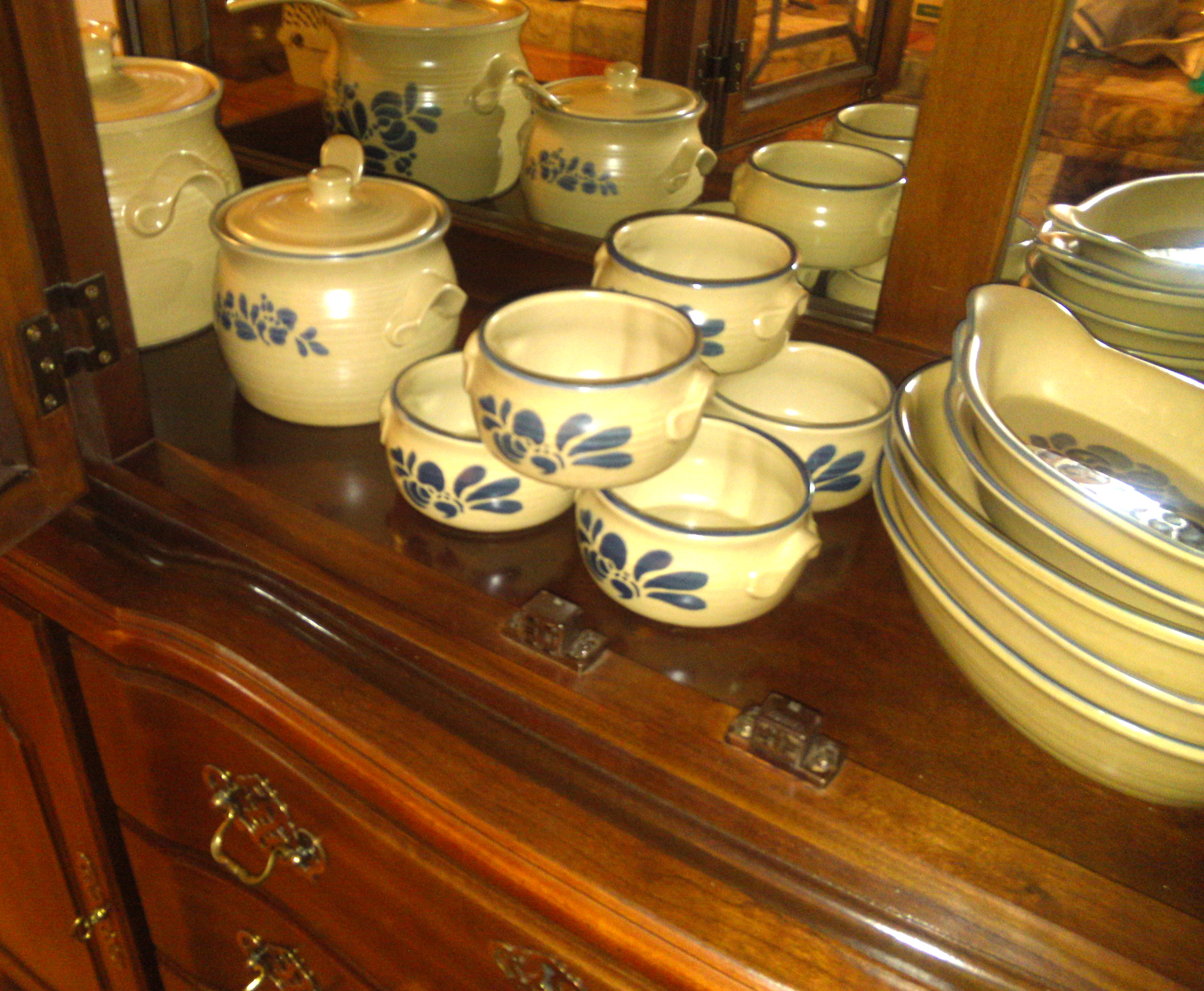
Pfaltzgraff Folk Art stoneware (1977 to 1983) modeled on early American salt glazed pottery; the stenciled pattern "Yorktowne" is Pfalzgraff's most popular.

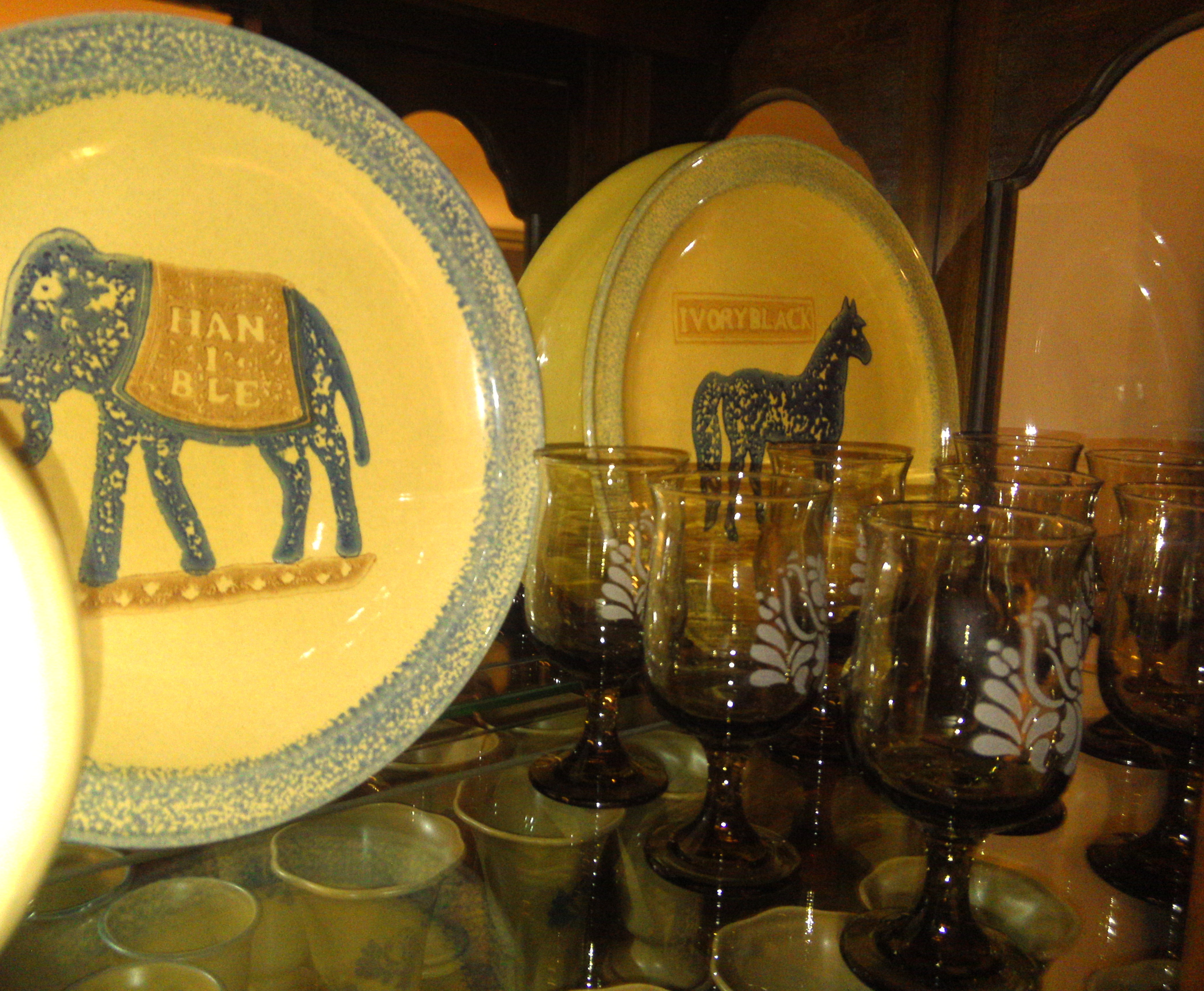
Pfaltzgraff America chargers designed by David Walsh in collaboration with Museum of American Folk Art, 1983 to 1985

Pfaltzgraff is an American kitchenware brand of dinnerware, serveware, drinkware and flatware.

== History ==
It is commonly reported that the Pfaltzgraff company was founded in 1811 in York County, Pennsylvania. The company states that the Pfaltzgraff family came to the United States in the early 1800s, and set up a potter’s wheel and kiln on their York County homestead. Their original pottery market was "as far as you can get with a horse and wagon and then get back home the same day". In 1889 brothers George and Henry Pfaltzgraff went into partnership, and built their first factory in 1894.

The Pfaltzgraff Co. was sold to Lifetime Brands, Inc. in 2005.

Pfaltzgraff is known for their stoneware collections and has released many patterns, some of the most popular including Folk Art, Yorktowne, Village, and America patterns. Pieces of the collection are identified by a Pfaltzgraff stamp on the bottom or back of the dishes. Vintage stamps consist of the words "Pfaltzgraff USA" accompanied by a castle motif.

While there is not an official list of pieces by Pfaltzgraff publicly available, hobby collectors have done much work to document and archive these collections.

== Cultural impact ==
Several lines of Pfaltzgraff glazed earthenwares have featured among the 100 most popular ceramic designs.
