= KTCK-FM =

Radio station in Flower Mound, Texas

Simulcast of KTCK, Dallas
- Flower Mound, Texas; United States
- Broadcast area: Dallas–Fort Worth Metroplex–Sherman–Denison metropolitan area
- Frequency: 96.7 MHz
- RDS: The Ticket Sports Radio
- Branding: SportsRadio 96.7 & 1310 The Ticket

Programming
- Language: English
- Format: Sports radio
- Affiliations: Fox Sports Radio; Westwood One Sports; Compass Media Networks; Dallas Stars

Ownership
- Owner: Cumulus Media; (Cumulus Licensing Holding Company LLC)
- Sister stations: KLIF, KPLX, KTCK, KSCS, WBAP, WBAP-FM

History
- First air date: April 1967
- Former call signs: KDSQ (1967–1969); KSHN (1969–1975); KIKM-FM (1975–1983); KZXL-FM (1983–1985); KIKM-FM (1985–1997); KDVE (1997); KNKI (1997–1998); KMEO (1998–2003); KTYS (2003–2008); KPMZ (2008–2010); WBAP-FM (2010–2013)
- Call sign meaning: "The Ticket"

Technical information
- Licensing authority: FCC
- Facility ID: 26468
- Class: C
- ERP: 93,000 watts
- HAAT: 621 meters (2,037 ft)
- Transmitter coordinates: 33°26′13.4″N 97°29′6.1″W

Links
- Public license information: Public file; LMS
- Webcast: Listen Live; Listen via Audacy
- Website: theticket.com

KTCK-FM (96.7 FM, "The Ticket") is a commercial radio station licensed to Flower Mound, Texas, United States, and serving the Dallas/Fort Worth Metroplex. It simulcasts a sports format with KTCK (1310 AM). KTCK-AM-FM are owned by Cumulus Media with studios on East Lamar Boulevard in Arlington. KTCK-AM-FM are the flagship stations for the Dallas Stars Radio Network.

KTCK-FM's transmitter is sited on Farm to Market Road in Rosston, Texas, about 35 miles northwest of Dallas. The signal extends into Oklahoma but may be hard to hear in some southern suburbs of Dallas and Fort Worth.

== History ==
=== KDSQ/KSHN/Kick'm Country ===
In April 1967, the station signed on as KDSQ. It was based in the Sherman-Denison area on 101.7 MHz. Two years later, it changed its call sign to KSHN. In 1975 it changed to KIKM-FM with a country music format during the day and Top 40 at night (simulcast from sister station KIKM), then to full-time Top 40 a couple years later. In 1983, the call sign changed to KZXL-FM, but two years later the previous call sign was re-established with a 24-hour country music format known as "Kick'm Country".

A decade later, KIKM-FM swapped frequencies with KDVE (also in Sherman), however the station went dark in 1997. During that time, the city of license was changed from Sherman to its current location in Flower Mound, Texas.

=== Memories 96.7 FM ===
Memories 96.7 logo from 1998-2003

A couple months later, the KNKI call letters were established, but the station did not sign on until November 1998, under the control of Disney/ABC Radio. After launching on November 23, 1998, as "Memories 96.7 FM", playing soft oldies from the 1950s to the 1970s, it changed call signs to KMEO on December 28, 1998.

During overnight hours, KMEO switched to live "Memories"/"Unforgettable Favorites" programming from ABC Music Radio. Previously live, local programming was briefly replaced by ABC Radio's corporate "Memories" satellite programming for a full 24 hours on June 26, 2003, until 5pm on June 27, 2003, when the "Memories" format was dropped.

=== 96.7 The Texas Twister ===
KMEO relaunched as "96.7 The Twister" (alternately "The Texas Twister") at 5 pm on June 27, 2003. The last song heard on "Memories" was "Thanks For The Memory" by Bob Hope. This was followed by the first song on the "Twister", "It's Five O'Clock Somewhere" by Alan Jackson. This was the start of 20,000 songs in a row without commercial interruption. Initially jockless, The Twister started adding DJs in September 2003. Its playlist was composed of "today's modern country hits" mixed with Texas country music, thus adopting the slogan "The Most New Country In Texas". The call letters were not officially changed to KTYS until October 21, 2003. On June 12, 2007, 24 Disney/ABC Radio stations, including KTYS, merged into Citadel Broadcasting's portfolio.

=== Platinum 96.7 ===
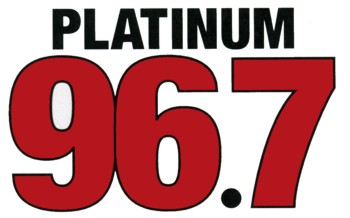
Platinum 96.7 logo from 2008 to 2010

On June 30, 2008, at 5:28 a.m., after five years as The Twister, the station ended its tenure as a country station in favor of returning to oldies as "Platinum 96.7". The last song on "The Twister" was "Kiss My Country Ass" by Rhett Akins, while the first song on "Platinum" was "Hello, Goodbye" by The Beatles. From there, it broadcast a diverse oldies format, as the playlist was taken directly from the remnants of the former ABC Radio's corporate "Memories" music library; thus, their slogan was "Forgotten Hits Re-Discovered". It also marked a return of a few former "Memories" personalities with Ron Chapman as the station's consultant. The callsign was changed to KPMZ on July 2, 2008 (referring to a platinum record and paying homage to "Memories 96.7"). The "Texas Twister" format was moved to its sister station KSCS's HD-2 signal. KPMZ ceased transmitting its digital "HD Radio" signal in 2009. Because the license to broadcast digital "HD Radio" is perpetual, the station could resume digital broadcasts at any time.

=== WBAP simulcast ===
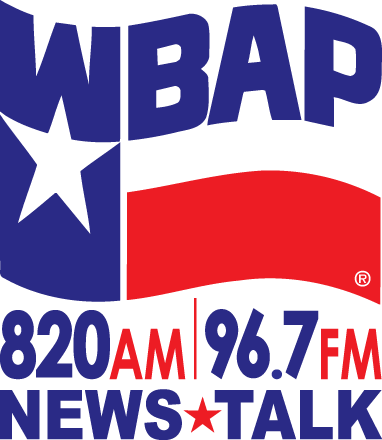
Former ident of WBAP AM & FM signals used 2010-2013.

At Noon CT on March 12, 2010, after playing "Na Na Hey Hey Kiss Him Goodbye" by Steam, the station briefly reverted to its previous "Texas Twister" country music format. Two hours later, a stunt known as "Reagan Radio" began, exclusively featuring sound clips from former president Ronald Reagan. The station began simulcasting sister station WBAP on Monday, March 15. Although broadcasting on a rimshot frequency, WBAP claimed that this station will provide "crystal-clear FM fidelity" for their listeners in 96.7's coverage area. The station changed call signs to WBAP-FM effective March 19, 2010. Citadel merged with Cumulus Media on September 16, 2011. With the simulcast in place, the station was responsible for activation of the North Texas Emergency Alert System (alongside sister stations WBAP and KSCS) when hazardous weather alerts, disaster area declarations, and Amber alerts are issued.

=== KTCK/The Ticket simulcast ===
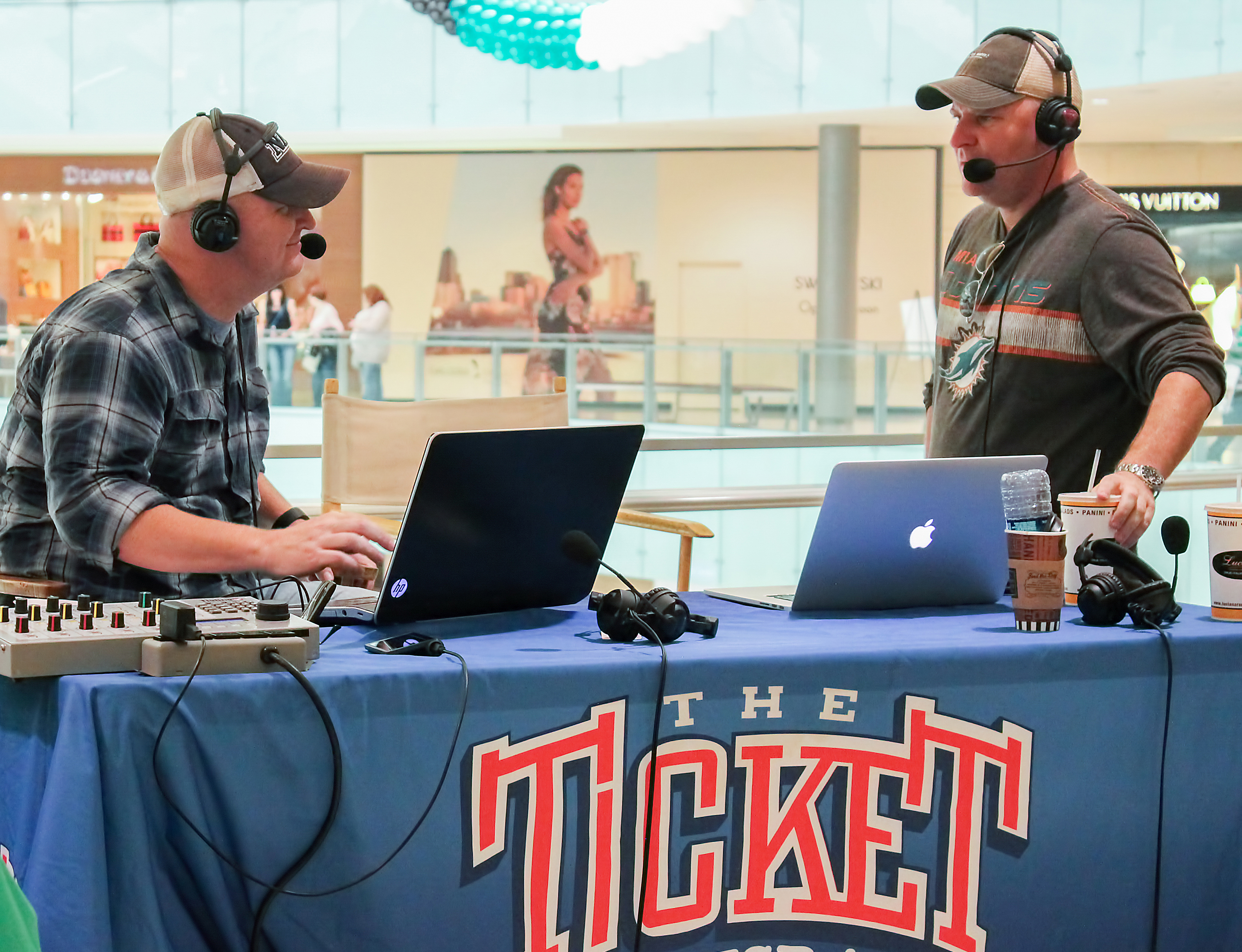
The Ticket broadcasting from a 2014 Dallas Stars fan-event at the Galleria Dallas

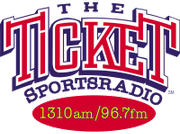
The Ticket's station logo used 2013-2020 before prioritizing its FM frequency over its AM frequency.

On October 7, 2013, Cumulus announced that effective October 21, 96.7 would change from a simulcast of WBAP to sports AM station KTCK. Dan Bennet, Dallas/Fort Worth market manager for Cumulus, said that WBAP had "no ratings increase since adding the FM". The WBAP simulcast moved to KPLX 99.5 HD2. A callsign change to KTCK-FM took effect October 27.

It is also likely, however, that the station's flip was also related to a botched sale of previous FM simulcast KTDK; the same day as the flip's announcement, the Federal Communications Commission had rejected a planned sale of the KTDK signal to Whitley Media to make room for a potential sale of rival station KESN by owner The Walt Disney Company; this was due to the structuring of the deal, attempting to find a legal loophole wherein Cumulus would still control KTDK through a local marketing agreement and could claim all financial support of the station and any sale or shutdown, and the FCC shut down such a loophole judging that such a move rendered Whitley Media merely a shell corporation for Cumulus, since they'd carry any financial success or failure the station had. Following the decision, Cumulus then decided to move KTCK's FM simulcast to 96.7 and turn in KTDK's licence for deletion by the FCC.

== Signal ==
Unlike most of the area's FM stations like sister stations KSCS, KPLX and WBAP-FM, which transmit their signals from Cedar Hill and Southwest Dallas, KTCK-FM transmits its signal from an unincorporated area within the county borders of Cooke, Montague, and Wise. Therefore, KTCK-FM's signal is much stronger in the Northwestern parts of the Dallas/Fort Worth metroplex as well as the cities of Decatur, Bowie, Gainesville, and Sherman, to as far north as Ardmore, Oklahoma, but is considerably weaker in Dallas and areas southeast of the Metroplex.
