= York Community Access Television =

Public access TV cable station in York, Pennsylvania

York Community Access Television (YCAT) was a Public-access television cable TV station in York, Pennsylvania.

The current cable system in the City of York began operations soon after the city and York Cable Co. reached agreement on the city’s first cable television franchise in 1964. The York Cable Co. later became Cable TV of York, then was known as Susquehanna Communications or Suscom. The company is now owned by Comcast Cable company.

== History ==
Cable television systems were developed in the 1960s with little government oversight or regulation. Companies wanting to expand their services had to use the public right-of-way to string their cables into a community. The City of York was among the first communities both in the Commonwealth and the United States to grant a franchise for operation and development of a cable television system. That agreement stipulated general standards for customer service by the cable television company. The York City Council approved that agreement by ordinance in 1964 — two years before the Federal Communications Commission established rules for all cable television systems.

The City of York renewed the agreement in 1974 with little change. That year, York Community Access Television (YCAT) was founded, establishing the second community access television station within the United States and giving York residents their first opportunity to make television. (The first cable access television station had begun in New York City.)

YCAT began with limited broadcast time on a channel shared with other programming. A third renewal occurred in 1984 which included the first and, until the latest effort, the only review of the cable television service and operations within the City of York.

That study and report recommended a dedicated public access channel, specific channels geared toward serving Spanish-speaking residents, channels geared toward actions of Congress and efforts at interactive television. Those changes led to many improvements in cable service, including addition of C-SPAN, an addition of a Spanish channel, and limited mandatory hours of community access programming. The City of York remains the only municipality in York County that mandates within its franchise agreement community access and other local origination programming. Springettsbury Township, however, has recently mandated governmental access within its franchise agreement.

The City of York agreement included specific language in which the company committed to providing quality service in installation, repairs and programming. That agreement also included a requirement that Cable television franchise fees paid to the city increase from 1% in 1984 to the maximum amount allowed by state and federal law of 5% by August 1992.

The agreement mandated a level of service of not less than 35 channels of video and audio programming. That programming included television programs available off the air, access programming, local origination programming and programming imported from distant markets and received from cable satellite networks. Access programming was mandated between a minimum of 12 hours to a maximum of 18 hours weekly with the cable company making its equipment and facilities available to users between 10 a.m. and midnight. Local origination programming also would consist of a minimum of 12 hours. All community access programming must be noncommercial.

Prior to 1996, community access shared a channel with other programming. From 1996-2004, the cable company made community access television available on cable channel 16, 24-hours a day, seven days a week. YCAT, Inc., a local volunteer nonprofit organization, oversaw operations of that channel. It largely operated on a budget of less than $10,000 per year, with the company, since 1997, donating between $3,000 to $6,000 yearly and volunteers raising the rest of the funds on their own. During its best years, YCAT raised as much as $22,000 yearly and offered twice-yearly training sessions to members. At its high mark, YCAT had more than 300 paid members. As of 2004, YCAT had slightly more than 100 paid members. 2004 marked the first in a few years that it offered a specific formal training session, although some members have informally provided training to interested members of the public.

In 1994, the City of York reviewed the cable franchise agreement with Cable TV of York. The agreement remained unchanged from what was approved in 1984. The city, through the franchise, had oversight on the operation of the cable television system which required the company to operate the system in accordance with state-of-the-art technology. Requirements existed for providing good customer service. Significant changes took effect within the cable industry since the 1994 and 1984 renewals, and from 1994 to 2004. Digital cable had begun. The internet and the use of cable modems came into wide use. Cable television programming grew dramatically. Satellite television outlets such as DirecTV and the Dish Network also became widely available, creating competition with cable television companies and definitely affecting franchise fees collected by municipalities.

== Susquehanna Communications (SusCom) ==
Susquehanna Communications was founded in 1965 as York Cable Co. and headquartered in York, PA. The privately held company operated advanced networks in six states serving over 230,000 customers. The company name was changed to Susquehanna Communications in 1999, reflecting its change from a provider of traditional cable television to a provider of a variety of advanced, interactive, digital communications products. In 2000, the SusCom brand was introduced for consumer marketing based on its familiar use and high awareness among customers.

Initially, television services offered by York Cable Television Co., now known as SusCom, amounted a little more than the NBC, CBS, and ABC network stations that broadcast locally, some network affiliates out of Baltimore or Philadelphia, some public television stations and any independent stations produced locally or offered regionally. The television service expanded as more cable television offerings increased over the years with the start of services such as HBO, Showtime, CNN, the Disney Channel, TBS, Lifetime and ESPN.

Suscom had invested heavily to keep its technological capability and what it offered to its customers both in the city and the surrounding communities as most up to date as possible. The company had installed broadband and offered digital cable as well as broadband internet service. Residents could listen to any sort of music they desire, watch nearly any type of program that interested them, receive digital and high definition television broadcast, have all sorts of pay-per-view programming and also see various programs produced locally by Suscom professionals or volunteers associated with the local access television station known as York Community Access Television.

On October 31, 2005, Comcast officially announced that it had acquired Susquehanna Communications (SusCom,) a York, PA based cable television and broadband services provider and unit of the former Susquehanna Pfaltzgraff company, for a net cash investment of approximately $540 million. In this deal, Comcast acquired approximately 230,000 basic cable customers, 71,000 digital cable customers, and 86,000 high-speed internet customers. Comcast previously owned approximately 30 percent of Susquehanna Communications.

== White Rose Community Television (WRCT) ==
White Rose Community Television (WRCT), once owned by Susquehanna Cable System since 1973, switched from York Community Access Television when Comcast took control of the area’s cable market.

WRCT is currently broadcasting on two channels in the York County region, channel 16 and 18. Both channels can be watched live from anywhere in the world via a live stream on WRCT.tv. Program schedules are also available at WRCT.tv.
