= Disaster area =

Region or location that is heavily damaged by a natural or man-made hazard

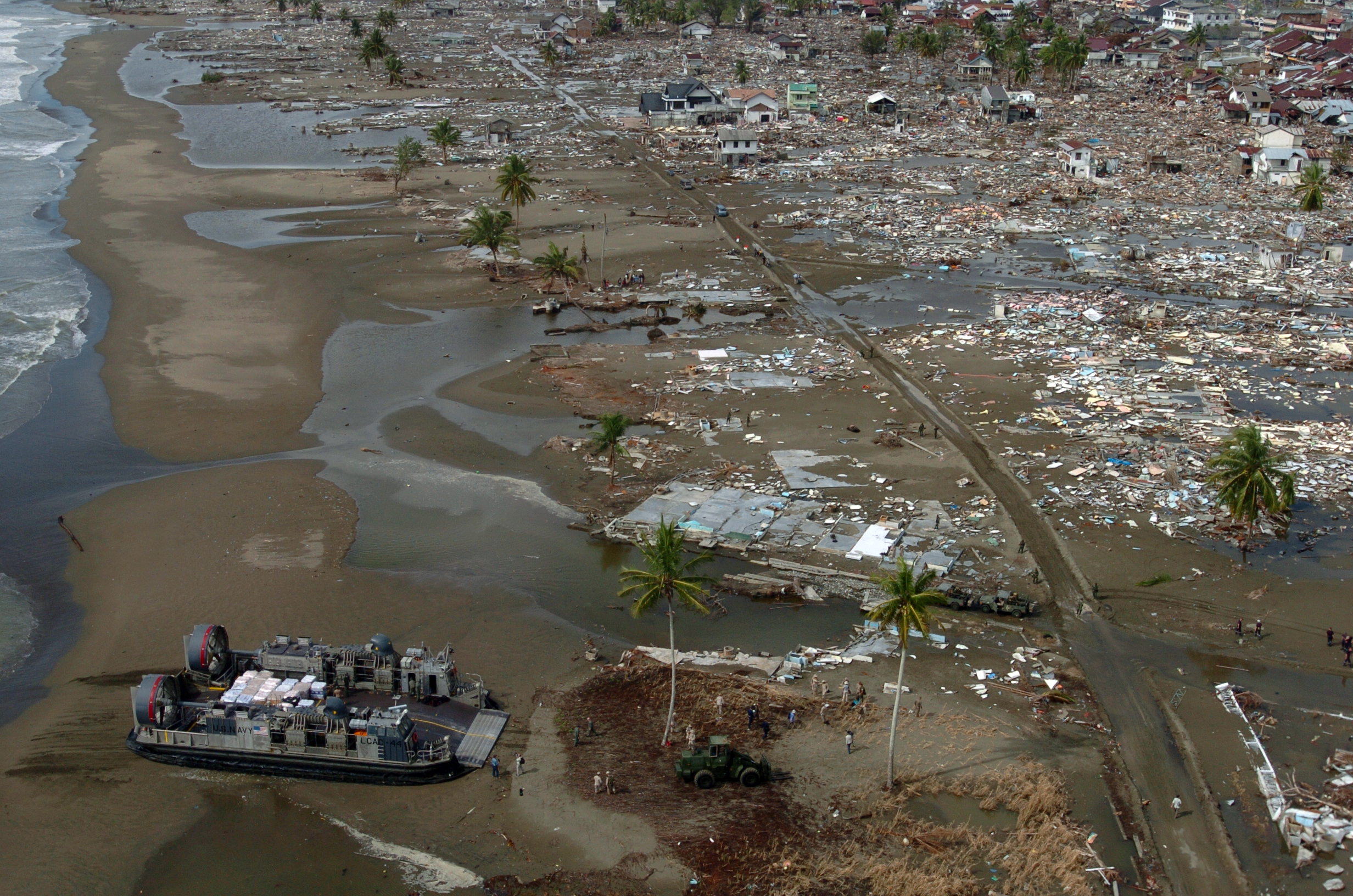
Hovercraft delivering aid to Meulaboh, on the island of Sumatra in Indonesia, in the aftermath of the 2004 tsunami.

A disaster area is a region or a locale that has been heavily damaged by either natural, technological or social hazards. Disaster areas affect the population living in the community by a dramatic increase in expense, loss of energy, food and services; and finally increase in the risk of disease for citizens. An area that has been struck with a natural, technological or sociological hazard that opens the affected area for national or international aid.

== Examples of modern disaster areas ==
An example of a technological disaster was the Fukushima disaster which was caused by a “massive 8.9-magnitude earthquake [that] hit northeast Japan”. This earthquake caused several hydrogen explosions at a power plant; five reactors were damaged, causing the plant to go into an emergency state. All this occurred because there was a technological error in the system that cut down the regular and emergency power, causing the five reactors to lose cooling capabilities and explode due to a buildup of hydrogen in the roof. This significant nuclear event had a mild impact on public health, as the area suffered nuclear contamination. The contamination caused all the crops such as milk, water or vegetables to be unsafe to eat, although any increase in cancer rates is expected to be too small to detect. Hence all food grown in that area was banned from being sold. People in the “surroundings were moved to safe shelters,” and 3 people were affected by the radiation alone. The “Japanese government [handled] the situation in the most efficient and amazing way that anyone can imagine.”

An example of a disaster area caused by a natural hazard is Hurricane Sandy which hit October 27, 2012. It was the most devastating storm in decades hitting the United States. The storm killed about 50 people and many were also hit by falling trees. The hardest-hit state was New York, leaving millions without power and a few homeless.

A disaster area caused by a sociological hazard is the terrorist attack on September 11th, 2001, in New York City. Two airplanes struck the Twin Towers, causing them to crumble, killing many people in the process. The unexpected attack harmed many people and had a detrimental impact on New York City.

The then-Victorian Premier Daniel Andrews declared a "state of disaster" for Melbourne, Australia on August 2, 2020, after the region had a drastic uprise in COVID-19 cases that could not be traced to the source of the infection.

On August 5, 2020, after the 2020 Beirut explosion, Lebanon's military council declared Beirut a "disaster-stricken city" after a powerful explosion in the seaport.

== See also ==
- Disaster
- Emergency management
- State of emergency
